= Porur =

Neighborhood in Chennai, India

- Neighbourhood
- Porur (Chennai) Porur (Tamil Nadu)
- Coordinates: 13.038200°N 80.156500°E
- Country: India
- State: Tamil Nadu
- District: Chennai
- Taluk: Maduravoyal
- Zone: Central Chennai Zone

Government
  - Type: Chennai Corporation
  - Body: Chennai Corporation

Area
  - Total: 5 km^{2} (1.9 sq mi)
- Elevation: 43 m (141 ft)

Population (2011)
  - Total: 46,690
  - Density: 9,300/km^{2} (24,000/sq mi)

Languages
  - Official: Tamil
- Time zone: UTC+5:30 (IST)
- PIN: 600 116
- Vehicle registration: TN 10(RTO, Chennai(South West))

Porur (Tamil: [poːɾuːɾ]) is a neighbourhood of the city of Chennai, India. It forms part of the Maduravoyal taluk of Chennai district. Situated about 17 kilometres (11 miles) by road from Chennai in the western part of the city, Porur is largely a residential neighbourhood with a significant portion devoted to commercial and industrial activities. Porur's ideal geographic position at the junction of the Mount-Poonamallee and Kundrathur roads at the western gates to Chennai city remains a major driver of economic growth.

The earliest recorded history of Porur goes back to the Chola period when it formed a nādu of the Chola Empire. Porur was administered by a village panchayat till 1 October 1977, when it was elevated to the status of a town panchayat. In 2011, the Porur town panchayat was abolished and its administration transferred to the Greater Chennai Corporation where they form part of the Corporation wards 151 and 153. While traditional in character, Porur has also recently witnessed considerable influx of immigrants from other parts of India largely in connection with industries and services related to the IT, construction and hospitality sectors.

Porur had a population of 46,690 in 2011. Porur is well-connected by road and has a bus terminus, railway stations and an airport in close proximity. It also has other basic amenities like water supply and sewerage and garbage disposal services, electricity, a sub post office and a police station. Six Chennai metro stations are being constructed in Porur as part of the Phase II extension activities. The Porur Lake is one of the biggest lakes in the Chennai metropolitan area and one of the major sources of drinking water to the city while the Sri Ramachandra Medical College and Research Institute, a top-ranked private health sciences university is also situated in Porur.

== Location ==
Porur is located at 13.03° N and 80.16° E, about 12 kilometres (7.5 miles) west from the Bay of Bengal coast at Foreshore Estate. It is surrounded by the Chennai neighbourhoods of Karambakkam and Alapakkam in the north, Valasaravakkam and Ramapuram in the east and Mugalivakkam to the south and south-east. Westward from Porur on the Mount-Poonamallee Road lie Thelliyar Agaram and Iyyapanthangal which form part of the Mangadu municipality of Poonamallee taluk, Tiruvallur district while on the east, the compound of the Chennai Air Traffic Control Tower Radar Station that extend upto Mugalivakkam Main Road form the limits, the radar station being administered as a part of Mugalivakkam. The shortest distance by road between Porur and Chennai Central Railway Station is 17 kilometres (11 miles).

== Geography and climate ==
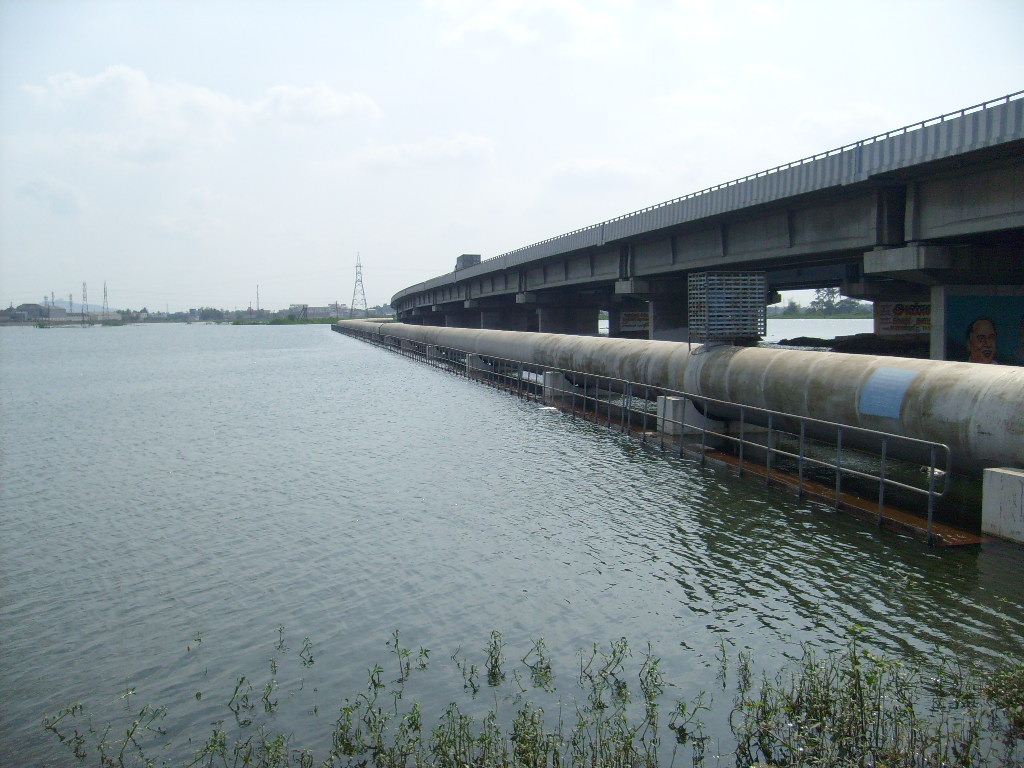
Porur Lake with the Chennai Bypass Road bisecting it

Porur is situated at an altitude of 43 metres (141 feet) above sea level. The soil is primarily alluvial made of clay and silt deposits and highly suited for agricultural activity. The Porur Lake is an important source of freshwater for Chennai city though it suffers from encroachment on its banks. The Porur Lake is connected with the Red Hills Lake and town of Porur plays an important role in the city's water supply. Low-lying hillocks abut Porur along the south and south-east, the most prominent among them being the Subramaniyaswami hill of Kundrathur and the Pallavaram Hill. Porur lies on low-to-moderate seismic risk zone the comparatively high water table facilitating liquefaction and absorbing aftershocks.

Under the Köppen climate classification, like the rest of Chennai city, Porur has the dry-summer version of a tropical savanna climate (As), During the calendar year 2009, Porur received 1062 mm of rainfall with a maximum temperature of 37.6 °C (99.7 °F) and minimum temperature of 21.1 °C (70.0 °F) degrees.

The Porur Lake supports a variety of flora and fauna. Porur is one of the few areas of Chennai where the house sparrow is found in large numbers with sightings confirmed by the Madras Naturalists' Society as part of its Sparrow Census project.

== History ==
The Ramanatheswarar Temple in Porur has an inscription of the Chola king Kulothunga I who reigned from 1070 CE to 1122 CE. Porur might have served as the administrative centre of the eponymous Perūr Nādū of the Chola province of Puliyur Kottam. The juridisction of Perur Nadu extended over a considerable area and included the surrounding neighbourhoods of Manapakkam and Kolapakkam as evidenced by inscriptions at the Agasteeswarar Temple in Kolapakkam.

The earliest modern references to Porur come from British maps and books of the late 18th century. In the early 19th century, the Kodambakkam-Kunrathur road and the St. Thomas Mount-Poonamallee Road were major trade and communication routes leading into Chennai city. However still, Porur was predominantly rural and sparsely populated till the 1960s, when the W. S. Insulators and the Moonlight factory were established with land and support from the Government of Tamil Nadu. The population grew from 1,938 in 1961 to 3,539 in 1971 and accelerated even further in the following decades achieving growth rates of 144 percent and 126 percent during 1971–1981 and 1981–1991 respectively.

The village panchayat administering Porur was upgraded to a Grade-I town panchayat on 1 October 1977. It was further upgraded to a selection grade town panchayat on 24 February 1982. Porur was transferred from the Saidapet taluk of Chengalpattu district to the Ambattur taluk of Tiruvallur district when Chengalpattu district was bifurcated in 1997. The area under the town panchayat was increased from 3.7 km^{2} (1.4 mi^{2}) to 5 km^{2} (1.9 mi^{2}).

On 1 October 2011, the Porur town panchayat was dissolved and the areas under its jurisdiction absorbed into the Greater Chennai Corporation where they were distributed between wards 151 and 153 of the corporation. In 2018, Porur was transferred from Tiruvallur district to Chennai district where it forms part of the Maduravoyal taluk.

== Demographics ==
Historical population
Year	Pop.	±%
1871	837	—
1921	1,332	+59.1%
1941	1,667	+25.2%
1951	1,790	+7.4%
1961	1,938	+8.3%
1971	3,539	+82.6%
1981	8,633	+143.9%
1991	19,507	+126.0%
2001	28,924	+48.3%
2011	46,690	+61.4%
Source: Census of India 1871-2011

According to the 2011 India census, Porur had a population of 46,690 with men constituting 23,450 (50.22%) and women constituting 23,250 (49.79%) with a sex ratio of 991. The adult literacy rate was 93.66% with a male literacy rate of 96.5% and a female literacy rate of 90.80%. The total number of households was 11,803. The population of scheduled castes was 3,647 and scheduled tribes, 49. There were 5,112 children who were under 6 years of age. There were 564 cultivators and 209 agricultural labourers. There were three notified slums within the Porur town panchayat with a population of 6,300. They were Kaliamman Koil, Thiruveethi Amman Koil and Chinna Porur. Slum dwellers constituted 13.49 percent of the total population of Porur.

As per the 2011 census, Hindus formed the majority numbering 39,394 individuals making up 84.37 percent of the total population followed by the Christians who numbered 3,956 (8.47% of the population) and Muslims who were 1,615 (3.45%). There were also 71 Jains, 27 Sikhs and 16 Buddhists. The Ramanathaswamy and Balamurugan temples of Porur attest to a Hindu presence stretching back over a thousand years. Porur has a significant and active Christian population due to Christian missionary work in Porur's Harijan colonies before and after independence.

The most widely spoken first language as per the 2011 census was Tamil spoken by 39,948 people (85.56% of the population). Telugu was spoken by 3,681 people (7.88%), Malayalam - 1,250 (2.67%), Hindi - 538 (1.09%), Urdu - 510 (1.09%), Kannada - 228 (0.4%), Marathi - 160 (0.34%) and Saurashtri - 108 (0.3%). The native language of Porur is Tamil which was the mother tongue for as much as 96.7 percent of the population in 1951. Inter-state migration in search of job opportunities in the information technology, construction and hospitality industry have resulted in an increase of people speaking languages other than Tamil from 3.3 percent in 1951 to 14.44 percent in 2011 with the Telugu-speaking population rising from 3.2 percent in 1951 to 7.88 percent in 2011 and those of other languages from 0.1 percent in 1951 to 6.56 percent in 2011.

== Administration and utility services ==
Greater Chennai Corporation (GCC) Representatives
Councillor for Ward No 151	S. Shankar Ganesh (DMK)
Councillor for Ward No 153	Santhi Ramalingam (DMK)
Member of the Tamil Nadu Legislative Assembly
P. Rhevanth Charan (TVK)
Member of the Lok Sabha
T. R. Baalu (DMK)

Prior to 1 October 2011, Porur was administered by a town panchayat headed by a President assisted by 18 councillors. The executive powers were vested in an Executive Officer who was usually an officer of the Tamil Nadu State civil service. Since its inclusion in the Greater Chennai Corporation, the territory under the defunct Porur town panchayat was distributed between the wards 151 and 153 of the Greater Chennai Corporation represented by an elected councillor each for the two wards. Both the wards come under the Zone No. 11 (Valasaravakkam) of the Greater Chennai Corporation.The area administered by the Porur town panchayat at the time of its dissolution in 2011 was 5 km^{2} (1.9 mi^{2}) and excluded Thelliyar Agaram, Karambakkam, Alapakkam and Mugalivakkam while its income during the year 1989-90 was Rs. 35.41 lakhs.

Porur forms part of the Maduravoyal Assembly constituency of the Tamil Nadu Legislative Assembly and Sriperumbudur Lok Sabha constituency of the Parliament of India. The incumbent member of the Tamil Nadu legislature is P. Rhevanth Charan of the Tamilaga Vettri Kazhagam while the incumbent member of the Lok Sabha is T. R. Baalu of the Dravida Munnetra Kazhagam.

Porur has many ancient Hindu temples like the Ramanatheswarar Temple that dates from the Chola period. There are also temples that have constructed quite recently. The Sethu Kshetram temple was constructed in 1964 for the employees of W. S. Insulators and inaugurated by the Shankaracharya of Sringeri. A tree was planted during the kumbabhishekam of the shrine on 27 October 1966 by R. Venkataraman, Minister of Industries for the Government of Madras. The Ramanatheswarar Temple and Balamurugan Temple are managed by the Hindu Religious and Charitable Endowments (HR&CE) Department of the Government of Tamil Nadu.

Water supply is provided by the Chennai Metropolitan Water Supply and Sewerage Board with headworks at Chinna Porur and Mount-Poonamallee Road while electricity is provided by the Tamil Nadu Power Distribution Corporation Limited. Law and order enforcement is handled by the T-15 SRMC police station which comes under the jurisdiction of the Avadi police commissionerate. The nearest fire station is located at Kumananchavadi.

Porur has two public parks, one each for the wards 151 and 153, maintained by the Greater Chennai Corporation. The Dr. M. S. Swaminathan Wetland Eco Park was established in Porur at a cost of Rs. 20 crores and inaugurated by the Chief Minister of Tamil Nadu, M. K. Stalin on 7 March 2025.

== Economy ==
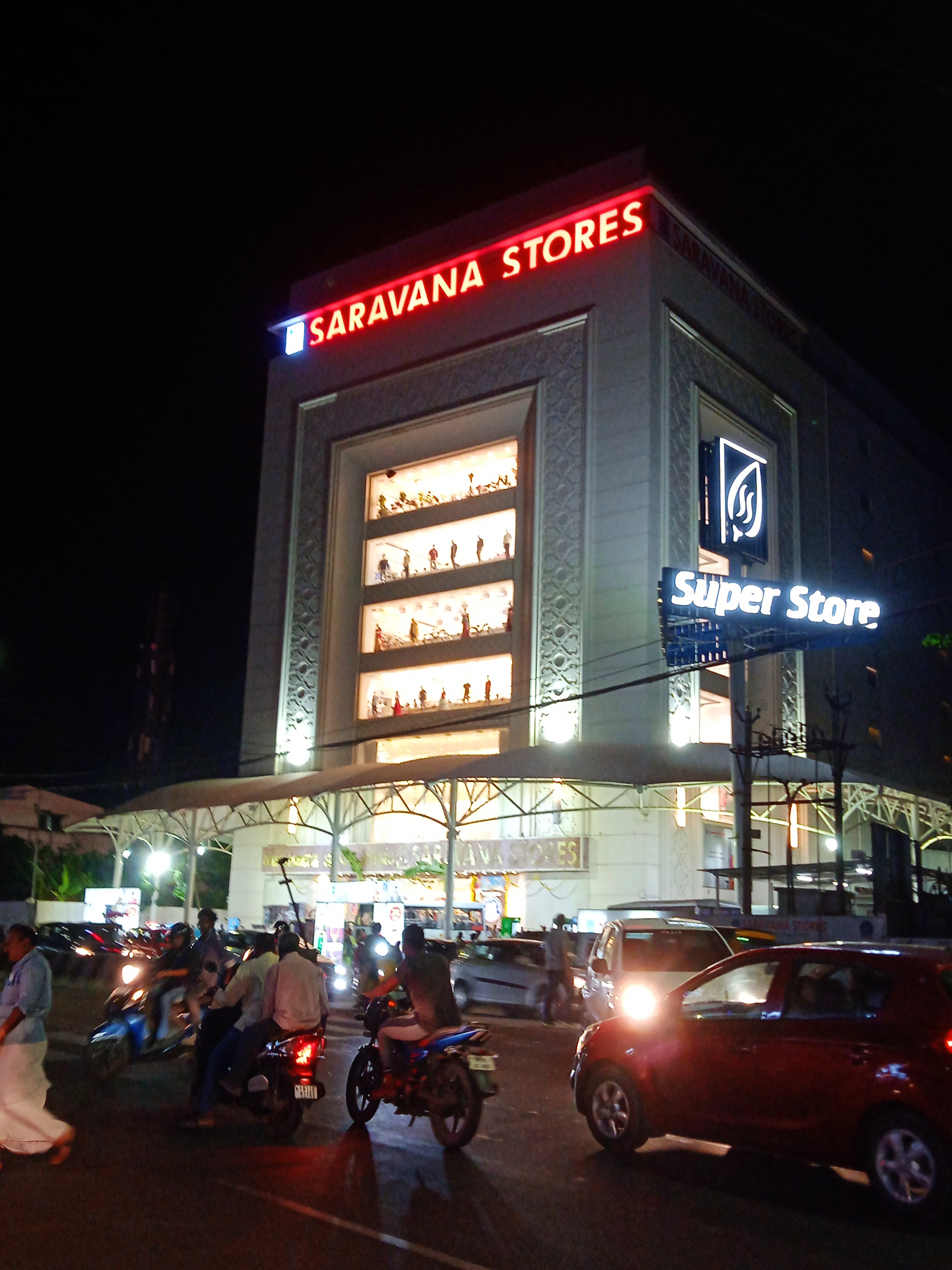
Saravana Stores outlet in Porur, 2022

Traditionally, Porur, like many of its surrounding villages, had an agrarian economy. The settlement grew around the two temples dedicated to Ramanathaswamy and Balamurugan and the Porur market in the vicinity serving as the town's chief marketplace. Surrounding the settlement on all sides were agricultural lands with rice being the chief crop. At the turn of the 20th century, the agricultural workers of Porur had organised themselves into a second-class cooperative society which was making a profit of Rs. 107-5-9 in 1905. With the expansion of the nearby city of Madras in the years following independence, corporates began setting up their offices in Porur. The first was the construction company Larsen & Toubro whose city offices were opened at Manapakkam near Porur followed by the cosmetic brand T. S. R. & Co at Ramapuram. The W. S. Industries (India), Rainbow Inks and Varnishes, the Norton Plastics and Film Company and S. & S. Power Switchgear Ltd along the Mount-Poonamallee Road and the Moonlight factory at Ramapuram were set up in the 1960s. The W. S. Industries (India) manufactured high tension and low tension insulators, lightning arrestors, condenser bushings, transformers, regulators, switchgear and switches in collaboration with Westinghouse Electric Corporation with a declared production capacity of 2,400 tons per annum in 1964. Until the end of the 20th century, Porur's chief manufactures were transformers while its exports were fruits and garments. By 2011, with W. S. Industries (India) having closed down, readymade garments and footwear had replaced transformers as the town's chief items of manufacture.

During the information technology boom of the 1990s, Larsen & Toubro started its own software and software enabled services subsidiary L&T Infotech at Manapakkam followed by the construction of DLF's IT SEZ ,DLF Cybercity Chennai at Ramapuram in 2007. Porur's first IT Park, Mindspace Commerzone was established in 2017. The Mount-Poonamallee Road remains one of Chennai city's important IT corridors.

The Arcot Road and Mount-Poonamallee Road stretches remain the shopping and entertainment hubs of Porur with major banks, retail garments and jewellery stores and restaurant chains operating branches and retail outlets. Saravana Stores opened its Porur outlet in Sakthi Nagar with heavy publicity on 7 December 2017.

== Education and healthcare ==
As of 2009, there were a total of 14 primary schools, 12 middle schools, 11 secondary and senior secondary schools in Porur. There was a polytechnic institute, the Little Flower Polytechnic College, in Porur while the nearest arts, science and engineering colleges were situated in Chennai city. There were a total of 8 recognised vocational training institutes while the nearest school for the disabled was situated at Poonamallee, about 7 kilometres (4.3 miles) away. There was also a hospital, a dispensary, a family welfare clinic, a maternity and child welfare centre, a maternity home and a veterinary hospital within Porur town panchayat limits besides a charitable hospital cum nursing home and around 20 medical shops. The nearest dental college is the SRM Dental College in Ramapuram.

The Sri Ramachandra Institute of Higher Education and Research, established in 1985, is frequently rated among the best medical colleges and healthcare institutions in India. While traditionally a part of Porur, the college is administered as a part of Thelliyar Agaram which in turn forms a part of the municipality of Mangadu in Kancheepuram district. The college offers postgraduate courses in all medical subjects besides doctoral courses in Neurosurgery, Surgical oncology, Cardiac Surgery and DM in Cardiology, Neurology etc. The National Institutional Ranking Framework (NIRF) ranked Sri Ramachandra Institute of Higher Education and Research 96 overall in India in 2024, 10th in Dental Category, 55 among universities, 20 in the medical ranking, and 31 in the pharmacy ranking. It was ranked first among private health science university in India in 2022 by India Today. The Sri Ramachandra Institute of Higher Education and Research had a total of 5,138 undergraduate and 1,475 post-graduate students on its rolls during the academic year 2018-19.

== Transport and communication ==
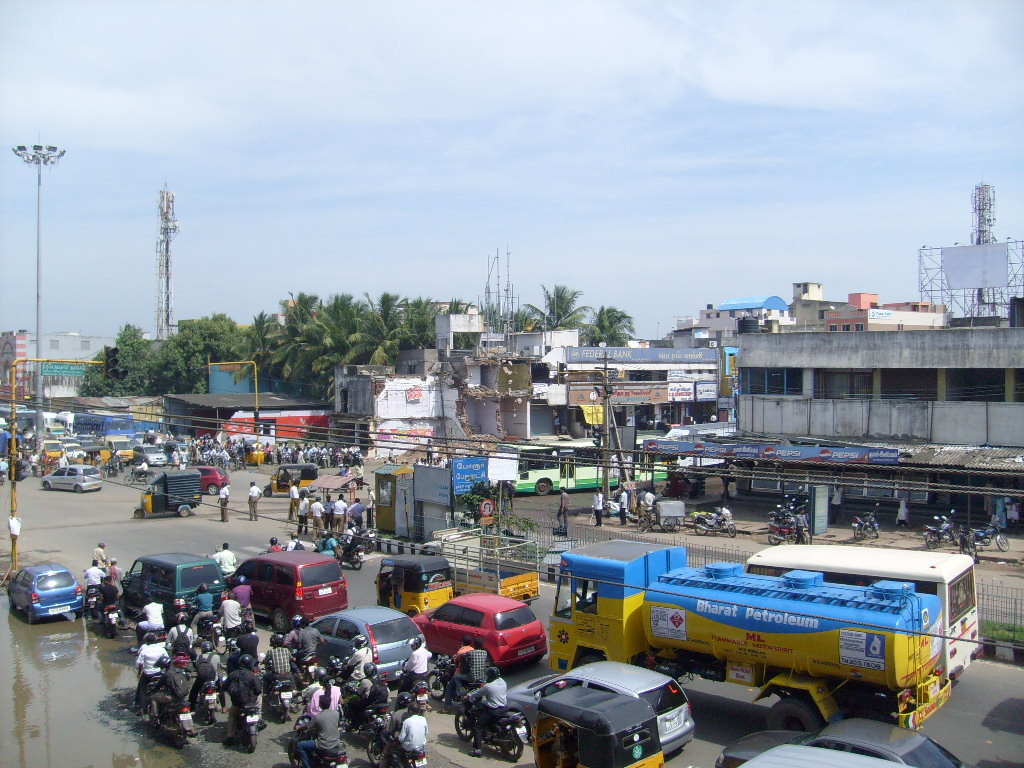
Porur Junction in 2011

Porur is well connected by road to the rest of Chennai city. The Mount-Poonamallee Road that runs between Poonamallee and Kathipara Junction is a State Highway that connects Porur with the Grand Southern Trunk Road. Beyond Poonamallee, the Mount-Poonamallee Road links with the National Highway 4 (India, old numbering) to Bengaluru. The Porur Junction is an extremely busy traffic intersection in Porur where the major arterial roads meet. The Arcot Road connects Porur Junction with Kodambakkam while the Kundrathur Road links Porur Junction with Kundrathur. Porur had a total of 37 kilometres (23 miles) of roads in 2011.

Porur is served by an efficient public transportation system. The nearest MTC bus terminus is situated at Iyyappanthangal. There are bus services linking Porur with Royapuram, Island Grounds, Saidapet, Little Mount, T. Nagar, Thiruvanmiyur, Mandaveli, Nanganallur, Mugalivakkam, Ramapuram, Poonamallee, Vellavedu and Sriperumbudur through the Mount-Poonamallee Road and Kundrathur, Pattur, Mangadu through the Kundrathur Road and Porur Junction with Royapuram, Vadapalani, K. K. Nagar, Vallalar Nagar and M. K. B. Nagar through Arcot Road. There are seven major bus stops: Saravana Stores/Sakthi Nagar, Gopalakrishna theatre, Porur Junction and Sri Ramachandra Medical College on the Mount-Poonamallee Road and Lakshmi Nagar, Alapakkam and Karambakkam on Arcot Road. There are private bus and share auto services from Porur Junction to Guindy and small bus services providing connectivity from Porur Junction to the Alandur metro station (Route S84) and Porur Junction to Guindy TVK Estate bus stop (Route S27). The nearest suburban railway station is Guindy while the nearest domestic-cum-international airport is located at Meenambakkam.

The Karambakkam metro station, and Alapakkam metro station are under construction along the Yellow Line while the Mugalivakkam metro station is being built on the Red Line of the Chennai Metro. The first metro rail services between Porur Bypass metro station and Vadapalani metro station were inaugurated on 11 October 2026.The Porur Junction metro station is another operational metro railway station situated in Porur.

Porur has a sub post office of India Post in Sakthi Nagar which falls under the Avadi Camp Sub Division of the Tambaram Division of Chennai City Region, Tamil Nadu Circle. Apart from Sakthi Nagar, there are also sub post offices in Alapakkam and Sri Ramachandra Deemed University campus. Regular postal services including speed post and parcel are provided along with postal savings and deposit accounts, postal insurance, etc.
