= Nerkundram =

Neighborhood of Chennai, India

- Neighbourhood
- Nerkundram(Chennai) Nerkundram (Tamil Nadu) Nerkundram (India)
- Coordinates: 13.0707°N 80.1846°E
- Country: India
- State: Tamil Nadu
- District: Chennai
- Metro: Chennai
- Elevation: 18 m (59 ft)

Population (2001)
  - Total: 39,544

Languages
  - Official: Tamil
- Time zone: UTC+5:30 (IST)
- PIN: 600 107
- Vehicle registration: TN 12 (RTO, Poonamalee)

Nerkundram or Nerkunram is a census town located in Chennai City, Chennai district in the Indian state of Tamil Nadu. It falls under Maduravoyal (State Assembly Constituency) constituency in Tiruvallur district in the Indian state of Tamil Nadu. It consists of a portion of Ambattur taluk and part of Chennai Corporation. It falls under Sriperumbudur (Lok Sabha constituency).

== Geography ==
Nerkundram is located at 13.0707°N 80.1846°E. It has an average elevation of 18 metres (59 feet).

== Demographics ==
As per the 2011 census of India, Nerkundram had a population of 39,544, of which males constituted 52% constituted females 48% of the total population. Nerkundram has an average literacy rate of 72%, higher than the national average of 59.5%; male literacy is 78%, and female literacy is 65%. In Nerkundram, 14% of the population is under 6 years of age.

== Localities ==
Now, Nerkundram is a part of Chennai Corporation. It belongs to 145, 146, 147, 148 circle in Chennai corporation. Previously Nerkundram was in the Suburban Panchayat near Chennai.

=== Ward 1 ===
P.H. Road, People Flats, Pallavan Nagar, Nerkundram, Church St., Mandaveli St..

=== Ward 2 ===
Valliammai Nagar, Selliyamman Nagar, Senthamizh Nagar, Santha Avenue, Agathiyar Nagar, Sakthi Nagar, RJR Nagar, Muthumariyamman Koil St, Sivasakthi Nagar, Kanniyamman Nagar, Nethaji Avenue, Azhagammal Nagar, Thamarai Avenue, Rajiv Gandhi Nagar, Krishna Nagar, Kothandaramar Nagar, Jayalakshmi Nagar, Moogambigai Nagar, Balakrishna Nagar, Dhanalakshmi Nagar, Thiramalai Nagar, Muniyappa Nagar, Annammal Nagar, Thiruvalluvar Colony, Saraswathi Colony, Janakiraman Colony.

=== Ward 3 ===
Mettukuppam, Govarthana Nagar, Rajiv Nagar, Nesammal Nagar, Jayaram Nagar, Dhanalakshmi Nagar, Sri Kadambadi Amman Nagar, CDN Nagar, Ramalinga Nagar, Buvaneswari Nagar, Senthil Nagar, Balavinayagar Nagar, Sakthivel Nagar, Abirami Nagar, Vadavenniyamman Nagar.

=== Ward 4 ===
Periyar Nagar, Sri Lakshmi Nagar, Balaji Nagar.

=== Ward 5 ===
Saraswathi Nagar, Meenatchiyamman Nagar, Jaya Nursery and Primary School, Dhidilnagar, Nerkundram New Colony, Perumal Koil St., Madha koil street, Madha koil main road.

== Education ==
- Ravindra Bharathi Global School (CBSE)
- Dayasadan Agarwal Vidyalaya School (CBSE)
- Sri Devi Matriculation School
- Lbeaar Matriculation School
- Jain Joseph Nursery and Primary School
- Sri Sastha Matriculation School
- Thai Moogambigai Polytechnic College
- Nathan Girls Higher Secondary School
- Marys Nursery & Primary School
- Dr MGR University
- Jaya Nursery and Primary School
- St. Antony Nursery&Primary School
- St. Elisabeth Matriculation School

== Areas Near Nerkundram ==
- Virugambakkam
- Maduravoyal
- Alwarthirunagar
- Koyambedu
- Saligrammam
- Vadapalani
- Valasaravakkam
- Alapakkam
- Mogappair
- Velappanchavadi
- Thiruverkadu
- Ayapakkam
- Ayanambakkam
- Kumananchavadi
- Karaiyanchavadi
- Ambattur
