= Manapakkam =

- Neighbourhood
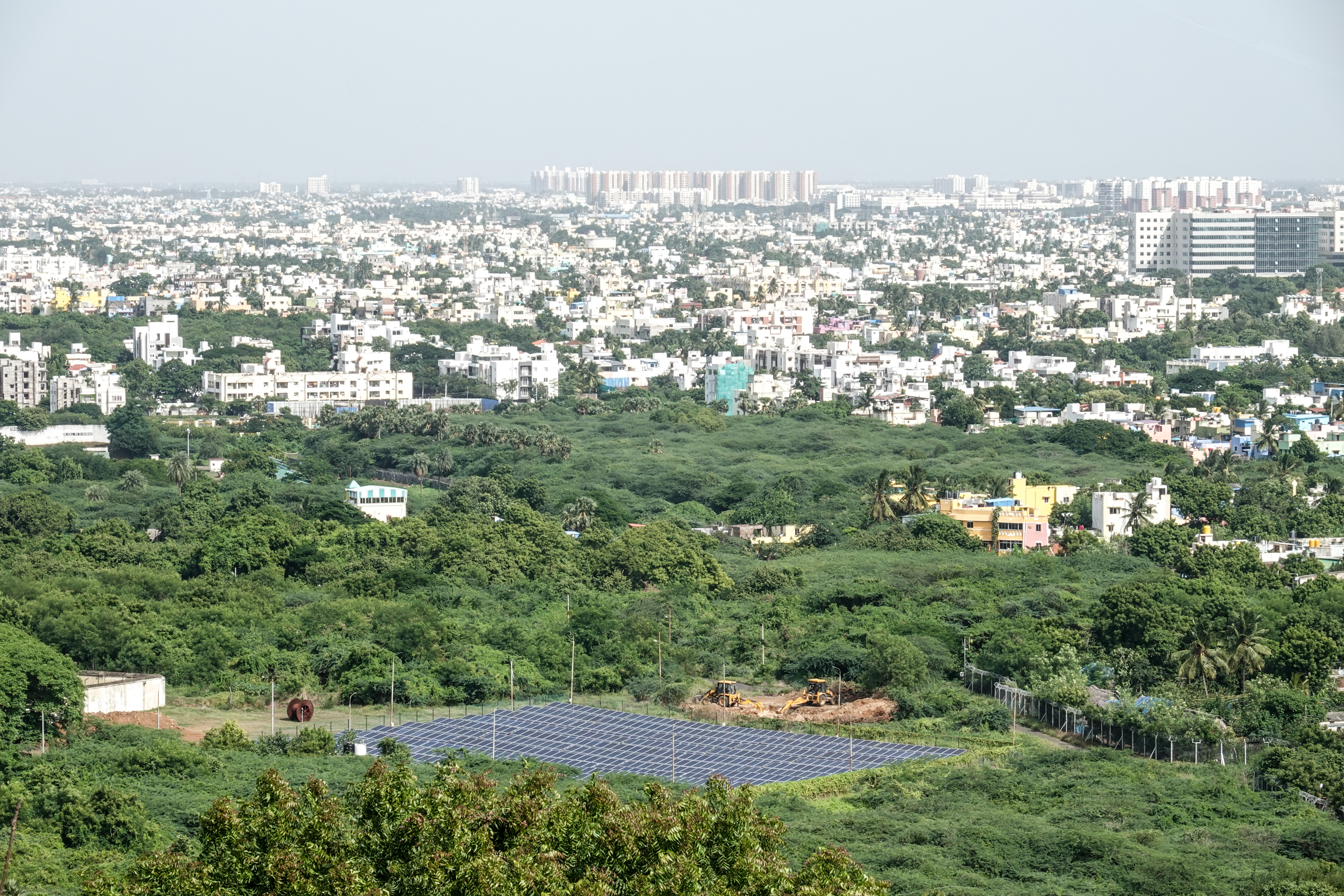
- View of Manapakkam and Nandambakkam from St. Thomas Mount

- Manapakkam (Chennai) Manapakkam (Tamil Nadu) Manapakkam (India)
- Coordinates: 13.021300°N 80.183200°E
- Country: India
- State: Tamil Nadu
- District: Chennai
- Taluk: Alandur
- Metro: Chennai

Government
  - Body: CMDA
- Elevation: 36 m (118 ft)

Population (2001)
  - Total: 8,590

Languages
  - Official: Tamil
- Time zone: UTC+5:30 (IST)
- PIN: 600125
- Vehicle registration: TN-10
- Planning agency: CMDA

Manapakkam is a neighborhood in Chennai in the Indian state of Tamil Nadu. A census town, Manapakkam is located along the Mount-Poonamallee Road in Chennai. It is now a home to many Core sector companies, like ABB, Hitachi Energy, DLF Cybercity Chennai and Larsen & Toubro.

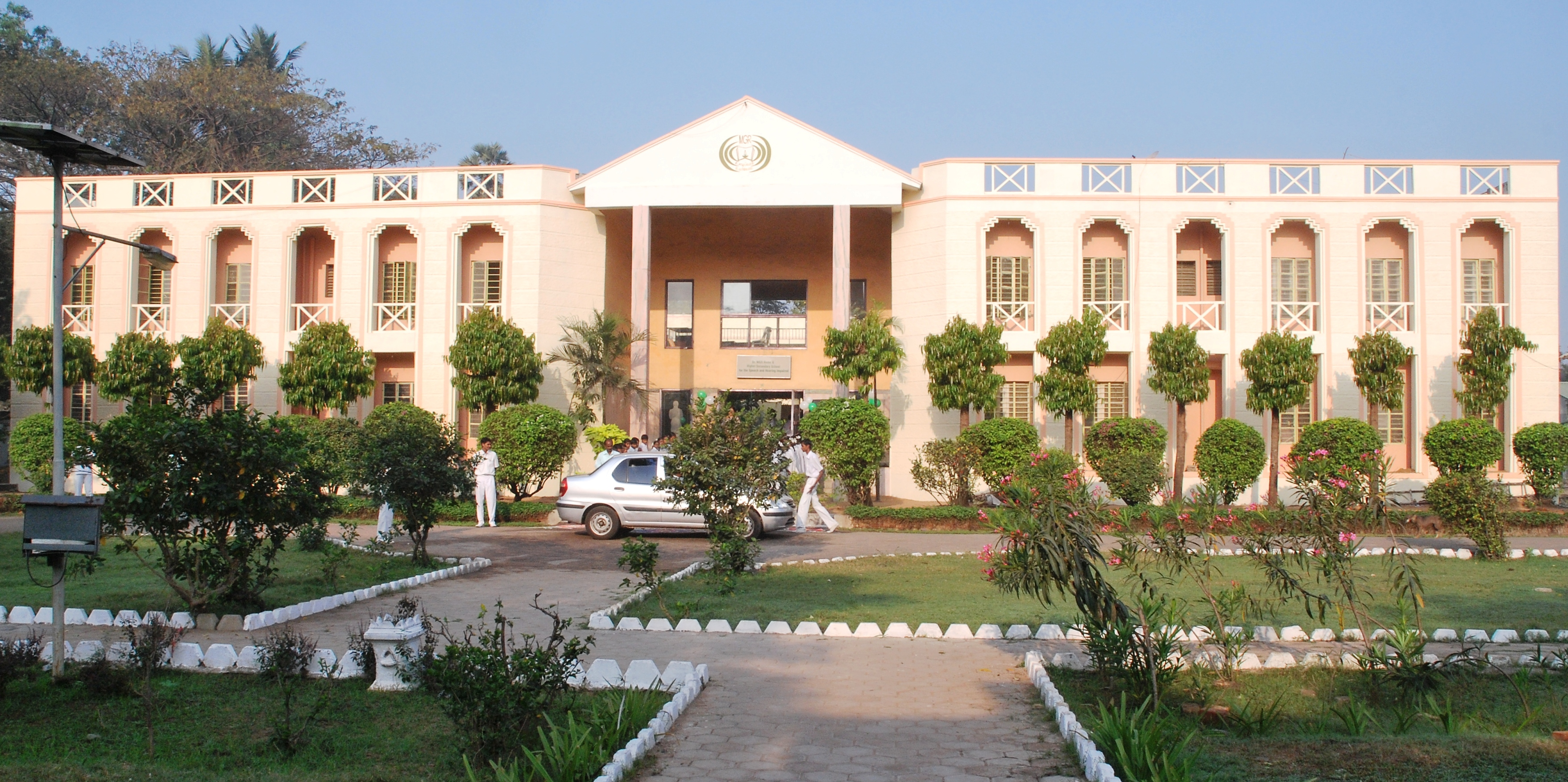
Dr. M. G. R. Home and Higher Secondary School for the Speech and Hearing Impaired, Manappakam

== Geographic location ==
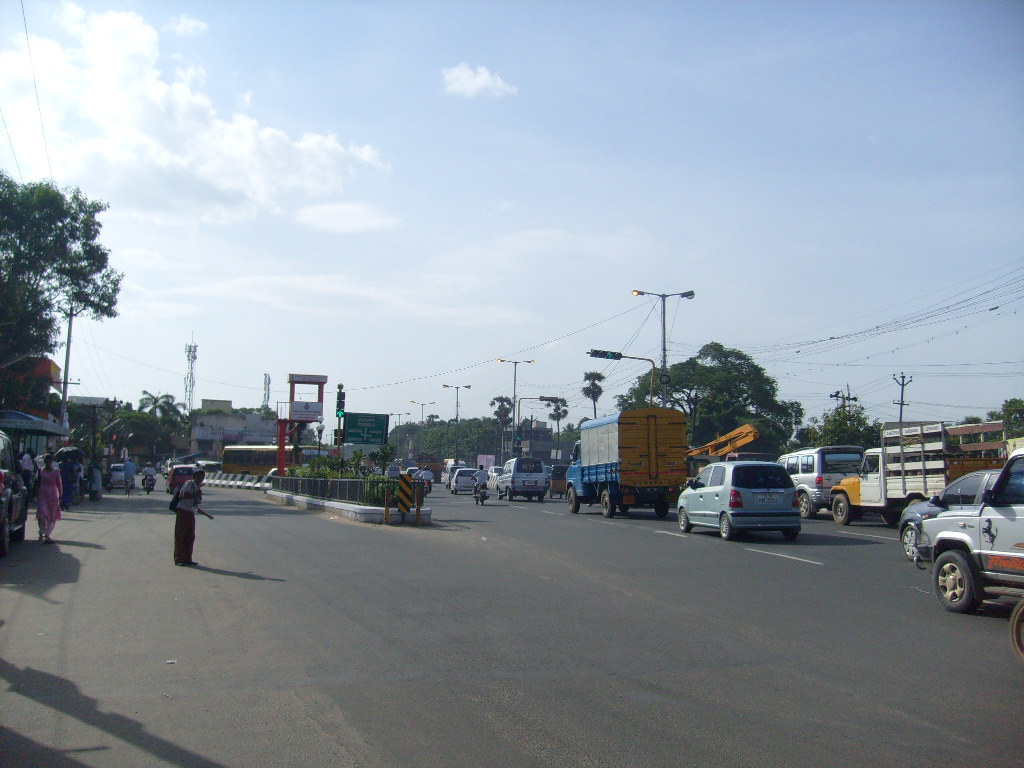
Manapakkam traffic signal on Mount-Poonamallee Road

Manapakkam is located between Ramapuram and Mugalivakkam in the north, Nandambakkam (part) and Parangimalai in the east, Nandambakkam (part) and Meenambakkam in the south and Kolapakkam in the west. The area is well-connected to other parts of Chennai via major roads, including Mount-Poonamallee Road.

== Demographics ==
As of 2001 India census, Manapakkam had a population of 8590. Males constitute 52% of the population and females 48%. Manapakkam has an average literacy rate of 73%, higher than the national average of 59.5%: male literacy is 77%, and female literacy is 69%. In Manapakkam, 11% of the population is under 6 years of age.

== Transport ==
Manapakkam is 5.3 kilometres from Guindy and 5.2 km from Porur. Bus services operated by MTC connect Kundrathur, Porur, and Saidapet.

The nearest railway station is Guindy railway station.

== Educational institutions ==
=== CBSE affiliated schools ===
- Lalaji Memorial Omega International school
- St. Francis International School
- Velammal Bodhi Campus
