= Moulivakkam =

- Neighbourhood
- Nickname: Bai Kadai
- Moulivakkam (Chennai) Moulivakkam (Tamil Nadu) Moulivakkam (India)
- Coordinates: 13.0215°N 80.1443°E
- Country: India
- State: Tamil Nadu
- District: Kancheepuram
- Metro: Chennai

Government
  - Type: Municipality
  - Body: Mangadu Municipality

Languages
  - Official: Tamil
- Time zone: UTC+5:30 (IST)
- PIN: 600125
- Vehicle registration: TN 10 (RTO, Chennai South West)
- Lok Sabha constituency: Sriperumbudur
- Vidhan Sabha constituency: Alandur
- Planning agency: CMDA
- Website: www.chennai.tn.nic.in

Moulivakkam is a neighbourhood of Chennai. It is situated 18 km south-west of Chennai on the Arcot Road. It comes under Mangadu municipality and is bounded by Porur on the north, Kolappakkam on the south, Mugalivakkam on the east and Manapakkam on the south-east directions. The nearest railway station is at Guindy, which is about 6 kilometres away. The Porur junction is around 3 km away and Kathipara Junction is around 5 km away.

== Recent developments ==
The real estate boom in India and Chennai had its course in Moulivakkam too. DLF SEZ was built and opened next to Moulivakkam in 2010. Multinational companies such as IBM, HP, CTS, and L&T Infotech have been located in this IT City. L&T ECC, L&T Ship Building and L&T AUDCO are also vested in this area.

== Tragedy ==
In the year 2014, on June 28, in Moulivakkam, 55 persons were killed and several injured due to the collapse of a multi-storeyed building. Due to this incident, its twin tower which was semi-finished, was demolished with controlled explosives on November 2, 2016.
