= Maduravoyal (disambiguation) =

Maduravoyal is a neighbourhood and taluk (subdistrict) headquarters in the city district of Chennai in the Indian state of Tamil Nadu.

Maduravoyal may also refer to:

- Maduravoyal (state assembly constituency)
- Maduravoyal taluk
- Maduravoyal Junction, bridge
