= Arcot Road =

State Highway in Tamil Nadu, India

State Highway 113

Major junctions
- From: Kodambakkam
- To: Sriperumbudur

Location
- Country: India
- State: Tamil Nadu

Highway system
- Roads in India; Expressways; National; State; Asian; State Highways in Tamil Nadu
← SH 112	→ SH 113A

Arcot Road (also known as N. S. Krishnan Salai) (SH-113) is one of the main arterial roads of the city of Chennai in Tamil Nadu, India. The 12-kilometre road connects Nungambakkam with Porur. The road was constructed in the early 1940s and has been responsible for the development of the outlying areas on the western fringes of Chennai city.

== Alignment ==
A span of 6 kilometres of the Arcot Road is located within the Chennai district and the remaining 6 kilometres are located in the Poonamallee taluk of Thiruvallur district.

The Chennai Metro Rail Limited and the Highways Department built a 400-metre long flyover along Inner Ring Road, Chennai at the junction of Arcot Road in Vadapalani on either side of the metro viaduct.

The Highways Department also built MGR flyover at the junction of Arcot Road with Mount-Poonamallee Road near Porur.

== Neighbourhoods traversed by Arcot Road ==
- Nungambakkam
- Kodambakkam
- Vadapalani
- Saligrammam
- Virugambakkam
- Alwarthirunagar
- Valasarawakkam
- Porur
- Alapakkam

== See also ==
- Transport in Chennai

== Bibliography ==
- Prince Frederick (7 August 2002). "Arcot Road: There's glamour amidst chaos". The Hindu. Archived from the original on 2 June 2004.
- "New look for Arcot Road". Indian Express. 24 June 1997.
