= Sethu Kshetram =

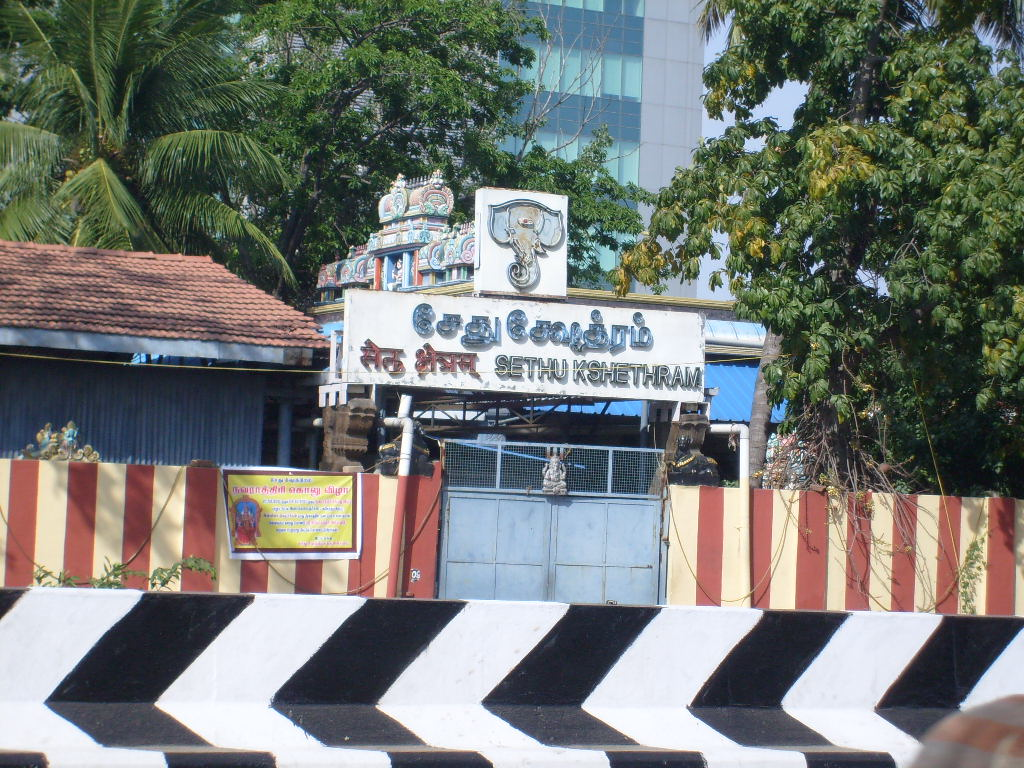
- Sethu Kshetram temple

Religion
- Affiliation: Hinduism
- District: Chennai
- Deity: Lord Ganapathi

Location
- Location: Porur
- State: Tamil Nadu
- Country: India
- Interactive map of Sethu Kshetram

Sethu Kshetram is a Hindu temple complex located at Porur on the Mount-Poonamallee Road, Chennai, Tamil Nadu, India. Located within the campus of the W. S. Industries, the temple has shrines to Ganapathi and Ayyappan. The complex originated as a Ganapati temple built for the employees of W. S. in 1964. The foundation stone was laid by the Shankaracharya of Sringeri.

== See also ==
- Religion in Chennai
