= Virugambakkam =

Neighbourhood in Chennai district, Tamil Nadu, India

- Neighbourhood
- Virugambakkam(Chennai) Virugambakkam (Tamil Nadu) Virugambakkam (India)
- Coordinates: 13.049557°N 80.184928°E
- Country: India
- State: Tamil Nadu
- District: Chennai
- Metro: Chennai
- Elevation: 17 m (56 ft)

Languages
  - Official: Tamil
- Time zone: UTC+5:30 (IST)
- PIN: 600 092
- Vehicle registration: TN 10 (RTO, Chennai South West)
- Parliamentary constituency: South Chennai
- MP: Thamizhachi Thangapandian, DMK
- MLA: A. M. V. Prabhakara Raja, DMK
- Assembly constituency: Virugambakkam
- Planning agency: CMDA

Virugambakkam is a residential neighbourhood of Chennai, Tamil Nadu, India. It is an important residential area of and is famous for its schools, market, residential colonies and residences of film artists. Virugambakkam had some of Chennai's oldest film studios.

Virugambakkam is one of the important localities of Chennai and owes its growth to the expansion of the city in the post-independence period. Prior to the establishment of residential colonies, Virugambakkam was a village covered by paddy fields, mango orchards and casuarina trees. Virugambakkam was first included within the Chennai city limits in 1977 along with other villages like Saligramam.

Virugambakkam is well-connected with the heart of Chennai city through roads. Buses running through Arcot Road link Virugambakkam with the more inner suburbs of Chennai city.

== Location ==
Virugambakkam is situated at a distance of 14.6 kilometres from Fort St George and 12.5 kilometres from Poonamallee. It is bound by Saligramam in the east, Koyambedu to the north and Alwarthirunagar to the west and south-west and K.K. Nagar and Ramavaram, Tamil Nadu to the south-east. Its frontier with Alwarthirunagar forms the western limits of the Corporation of Chennai.

== History ==
The growth of Virugambakkam accompanied the expansion of Madras city during the years preceding independence. Virugambakkam was one of the many localities which cropped up during the Second World War. At that time, it was a part of the Kodambakkam-Saligramam-Puliyur residential district of Greater Madras. During the 1940s, Arcot Road was constructed connecting Nungambakkam with the Mount-Poonamallee Road. In 1948, the first movie studios made their appearance when Avichi Meiyappa Chettiar shifted his base from Karaikudi. The locality has since become a haven for movie producers and cine artists.

Virugambakkam was one of the important places connected with the Anti-Hindi agitations of 1965. Aranganathan, a 32-year-old employee with the Indian Postal Service immolated himself in protest against the imposition of Hindi. The Dravida Munnetra Kazhagam vigorously campaigned in the Virugambakkam region during the 1967 elections. Dravida Munnetra Kazhagam has done a first state level meeting it has been organised by V.P Akilan. the meeting has been held in front of Arignar Anna, Karunanithi, M.G Ramachandran and some leaders in Dravida Munnetra Kazhagam.

Until the 1970s, Virugambakkam was little more than an insignificant village. It formed a part of Saidapet taluk of Chengleput district. Apart from a few movie studios, there were only a few sparsely populated settlements. The interior area which makes up the middle-class residential colonies were covered by paddy fields. The town had a population of 8,013 in 1971. During those times, the outlying suburbs of the city alongside Arcot Road had a reputation for insecurity and as the haunt of sex. Until the early 1970s, the suburb of Kodambakkam formed the western frontier of Madras city. Virugambakkam was included in Madras city in 1973 along with Saligrammam. Since then, growth has accelerated, peaking in the 1980s and 1990s. The good quality of ground water available in the Arcot Road suburbs was an important reason for the region's growth.

== Geography ==
The soil is fertile and productive as is evident from the fact that paddy fields once covered the area. However, paddy fields have completely disappeared. Natural gas was discovered near Virugambakkam in 1966. To date, Virugambakkam is the only known source of natural gas in Chennai city apart from Avadi.

Once Virugambakkam had a big lake which was maintained by Madras Water Supplies and Sewage Board (now called CMWSSB) and drew water for drinking with several pump houses around the lake until 1976, and several small ponds. After that the lake was encroached by antisocial elements with help of all party politicians and converted it into a habitat. The road around that lake turned habitat is called as Erikarai Street. The ponds have also been encroached and turned into habitat.

The Virugambakkam Canal separates Virugambakkam from suburbs such as Koyambedu, which lie towards the interior. The canal runs for about 6 kilometres through the suburbs of Choolaimedu, Arumbakkam and Vadapalani before entering Virugambakkam. This canal originally served the purpose of irrigating farm lands. However, with the transformation of farmlands into residential localities, the canal has been converted into a drain. During the monsoons, the canal frequently overflows creating havoc for the residents of the nearby areas. In 2003, desilting work was carried out to deal with the situation.

== Localities ==
Virugambakkam extends for about 2 kilometres from Avichi Higher Sec. School in Arcot Road to Valasarawakkam. Virugambakkam extends alongside Arcot Road adjacent to Saligrammam in the east, Valasaravakkam in the west, Koyambedu in the north and KK Nagar in the south. State Bank Colony and Baskar Colony are some of the important residential areas in the neighbourhood. Kaaliamman Koil Street which connects Virugambakkam and Koyambedu, Arcot Road are the main arterial roads.

== Important landmarks ==
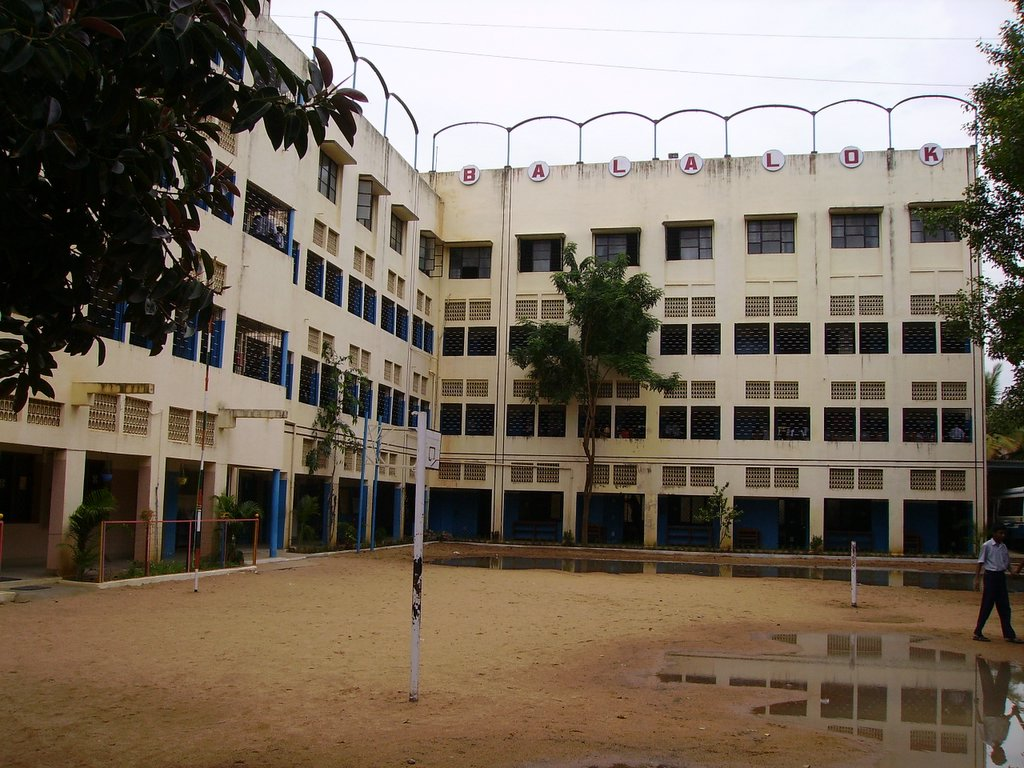
Balalok Matriculation Higher Secondary School in Virugambakkam

Virugambakkam is known for its movie studios and schools. It is also the home to a large number of film actors, music composers and other artists. The Virugambakkam market which lies to the west is a source for fresh vegetables. Some important temples are the Vembuliamman Koil, the Kaliamman Koil, the Raghavendra temple, the Sankarashramam-Sri Raja Rajeswari Temple, the Hari Hara Temple, and the Siva Vishnu Temple. There is also a mosque and numerous churches. Virugambakkam also has a number of hospitals which along with the schools and departmental stores cater to the needs of the residential colonies. The Virugambakkam RTO Office is located at Chinmayanagar on Kaliamman Koil Street. There are also more nationalised and private banks.

=== Shopping malls ===
Chandra Metro Mall is a shopping mall located in Virugambakkam. The mall has a built up area of 143,000 square feet (13,300 m^{2}) and was opened on 9 April 2011. The mall has a five screen multiplex with a capacity of 1,300 seats called INOX-National operated by INOX Leisure. It has Food Bazaar, E-Zone, Pantaloons as its major anchors. The food court is spread over an area of 10,000 sq. ft. The mall was built after demolishing the National Theatre. The mall's ground floor to floor below the theatre, D-mart is situated.

== Educational institutions ==
=== Schools ===
- St. Johns Matriculation Higher Secondary School
- Vani Vidyalaya Senior Secondary & Junior College (near Meenakshi Engineering College)
- Vani International (near Vani Vidyalaya Senior Secondary & Junior College)
- Avichi Higher Secondary School
- Chinmaya Vidyalaya Senior Secondary School
- A. V. M. Matriculation Higher Secondary School
- A.V.M Rajeswari Matriculation Higher Secondary School
- Balalok Matriculation Higher Secondary School
- Clarence Matriculation
- Little Millennium (Educomp) for pre-schoolers
- Jaigopal Garodia Girls Higher Secondary School
- Padma Sarangapani Matriculation Higher Secondary School

=== Colleges ===
- Avichi College of Arts and Science
- Meenakshi Engineering College (near Vani Vidyalaya Senior Secondary & Junior College)
- Meenakshi Dental College

== Transport and communication ==
Virugambakkam is well-connected with the heart of Chennai city as it lies on the Arcot Road, which is considered to be one of Chennai's arterial roads. Virugambakkam lies on the Poonamallee-Vadapalani-Broadway bus route. The nearest bus terminuses are Saligrammam, Chennai Moffusil Bus Terminus (CMBT) and Vadapalani. The nearest suburban railway station is at Kodambakkam, 4 kilometres from Virugambakkam. The Chennai Metro stations present in Virugambakkam area are Virugambakkam metro station, located on Kaliamman Koil Street and Alwarthirunagar metro station on Arcot Road.
