= Kolapakkam =

- Neighbourhood
- Kolapakkam, Kanchipuram district (Tamil Nadu)
- Coordinates: 13.0101°N 80.1492°E
- Country: India
- State: Tamil Nadu
- District: Kancheepuram district
- Elevation: 42 m (138 ft)

Languages
  - Official: Tamil, English
  - Speech: Tamil, English
- Time zone: UTC+5:30 (IST)
- PIN: 600116
- Neighbourhoods: Porur, Mugalivakkam, Madhanandhapuram, Gerugambakkam, Kovur, Moulivakkam, Pammal, Anakaputhur and Meenambakkam
- District Collector: Dr. M. Aarthi, I. A. S.
- LS: Kancheepuram
- MP: G. Selvam
- Website: https://kancheepuram.nic.in

Kolapakkam is a neighbourhood in Kanchipuram district of Tamil Nadu state in the peninsular India.

Kolapakkam is located at an altitude of about 42 m above the mean sea level with the geographical coordinates of 13.0101°N 80.1492°E.

Agastheeswarar Temple and Dharmaraja Temple situated in Kolapakkam are under the control of Hindu Religious and Charitable Endowments Department, Government of Tamil Nadu.
