= Chennai Trade Centre =

Building in India

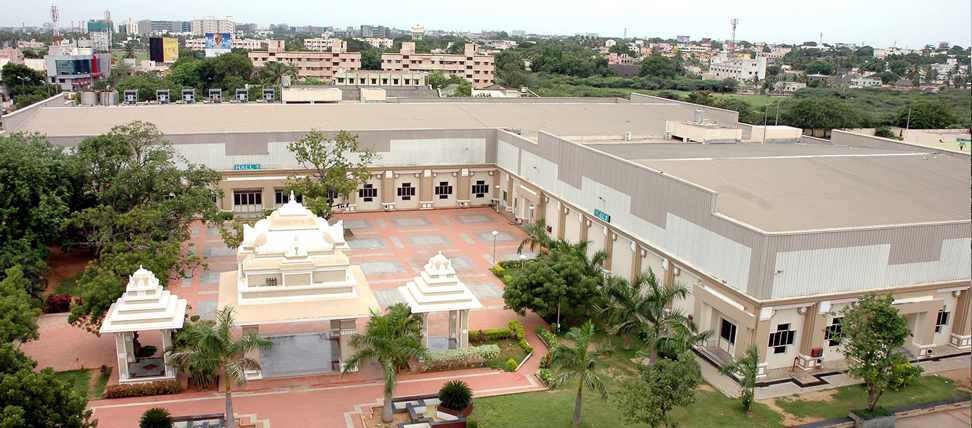
- A bird's eye view of the Chennai Trade Centre
- Interactive map of the Chennai Trade Centre area

General information
- Type: Exhibition Centre and Auditorium
- Architectural style: Ethnic
- Location: Nandambakkam, Chennai, India
- Coordinates: 13.0148°N 80.1909°E
- Construction started: 2000
- Completed: 2001
- Inaugurated: 2001
- Cost: ₹ 300 million
- Owner: Tamil Nadu Trade Promotion Organisation (TNTPO)

Technical details
- Floor area: 8,348 m^{2} (90,000 sq ft)

Design and construction
- Architect: C R Narayan Rao

Chennai Trade Centre is a permanent exhibition complex in Nandambakkam, Chennai, hosting several trade fairs and conventions round the year. It is the first fair infrastructure that has been developed by India Trade Promotion Organisation (ITPO)—the premier trade promotion agency of the Government of India, Ministry of Commerce and Industry—outside Delhi. A joint initiative of the ITPO and the Tamil Nadu Trade Promotion Organisation, which hold 51 and 49 percent stakes, respectively, the Trade Centre was designed by C R Narayan Rao, and was commissioned in January 2001, while the convention centre was commissioned on 1 November 2004. The exhibition hall was constructed at an estimated cost of ₹ 23 crore and the convention centre at a cost of ₹ 22 crore. Together, these centres cover 10,560 sq m and are fully booked for 75 days in a year. Built over an area of 25.48 acres, the centre comprises four modules of 4,400 m^{2} each of exhibition halls and support services to be built in a phased manner. In the first phase, two air-conditioned halls without pillars or columns encompassing areas of 5,000 m^{2} and 1,850 m^{2} were constructed. There are three halls, viz, Hall No. 1 (4,400 m^{2}), Hall No. 2 (1,760 m^{2}) and Hall No. 3 (4,400 m^{2}). The halls feature a height of 6 m to display all merchandise including machinery. These have been supplemented recently with a modern, fully air-conditioned convention centre. All the halls are inter-linked, and Hall No. 3 is connected with the convention centre. The convention centre can accommodate 2,000 people with a provision for dividing the hall into two equal parts and has an audiovisual facility suitable for multi-purpose use such as conferences, conventions, cultural shows, and so forth. The Chennai Trade Centre is managed by Tamil Nadu Trade Promotion Organisation (TNTPO), a joint venture of ITPO and Tamil Nadu Industrial Development Corporation (TIDCO).

== Location ==
The Chennai Trade Centre is located in Nandambakkam on the arterial Mount-Poonamallee Road. It lies in the northern fringe of the Chennai Airport at a distance of about 6 km from the airport and 1.5 km from the Kathipara Junction. The nearest railway station is St Thomas Mount Railway Station of the Chennai Suburban Railway Network.

== Facilities ==
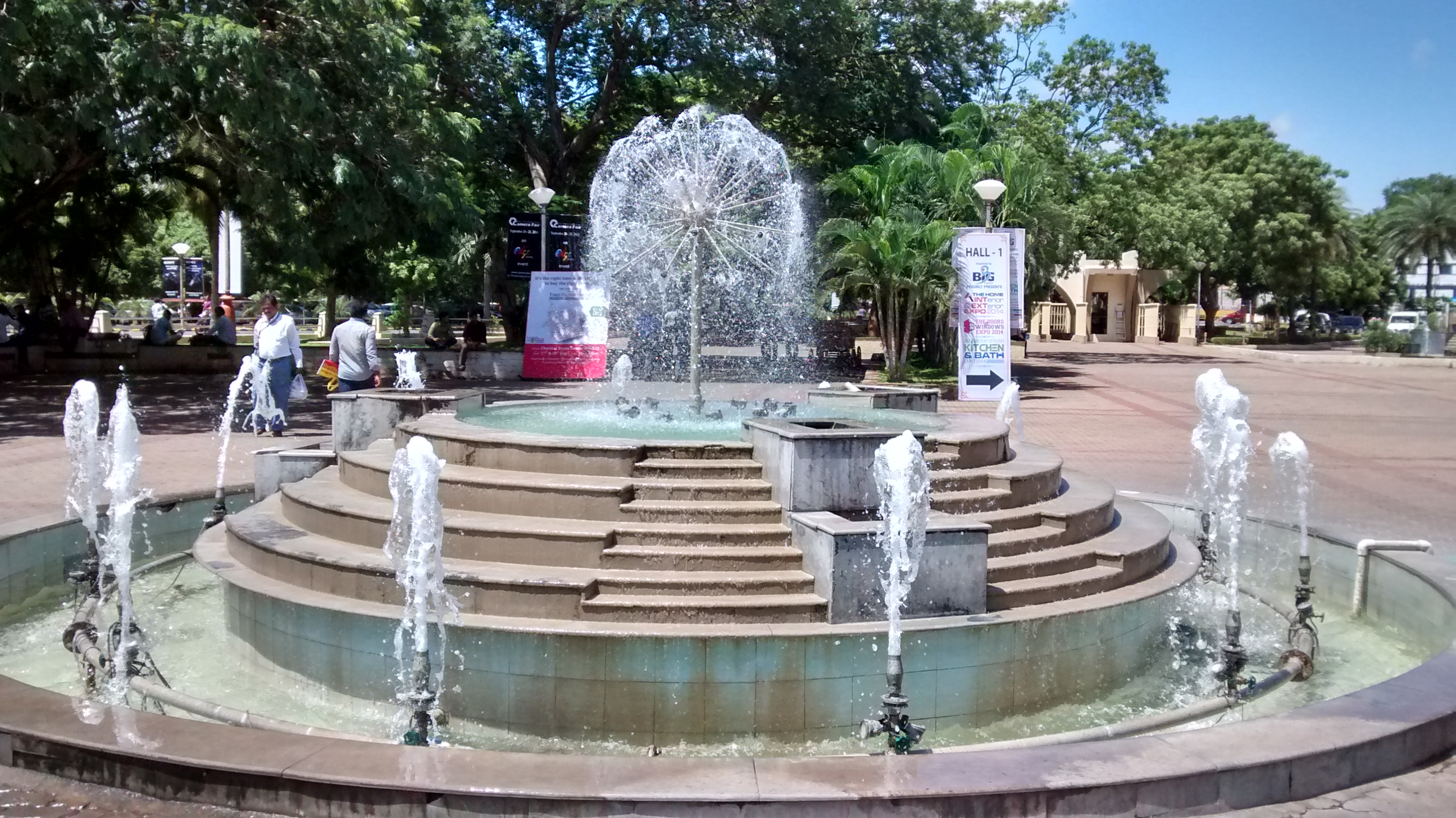
Fountain at the Trade Centre

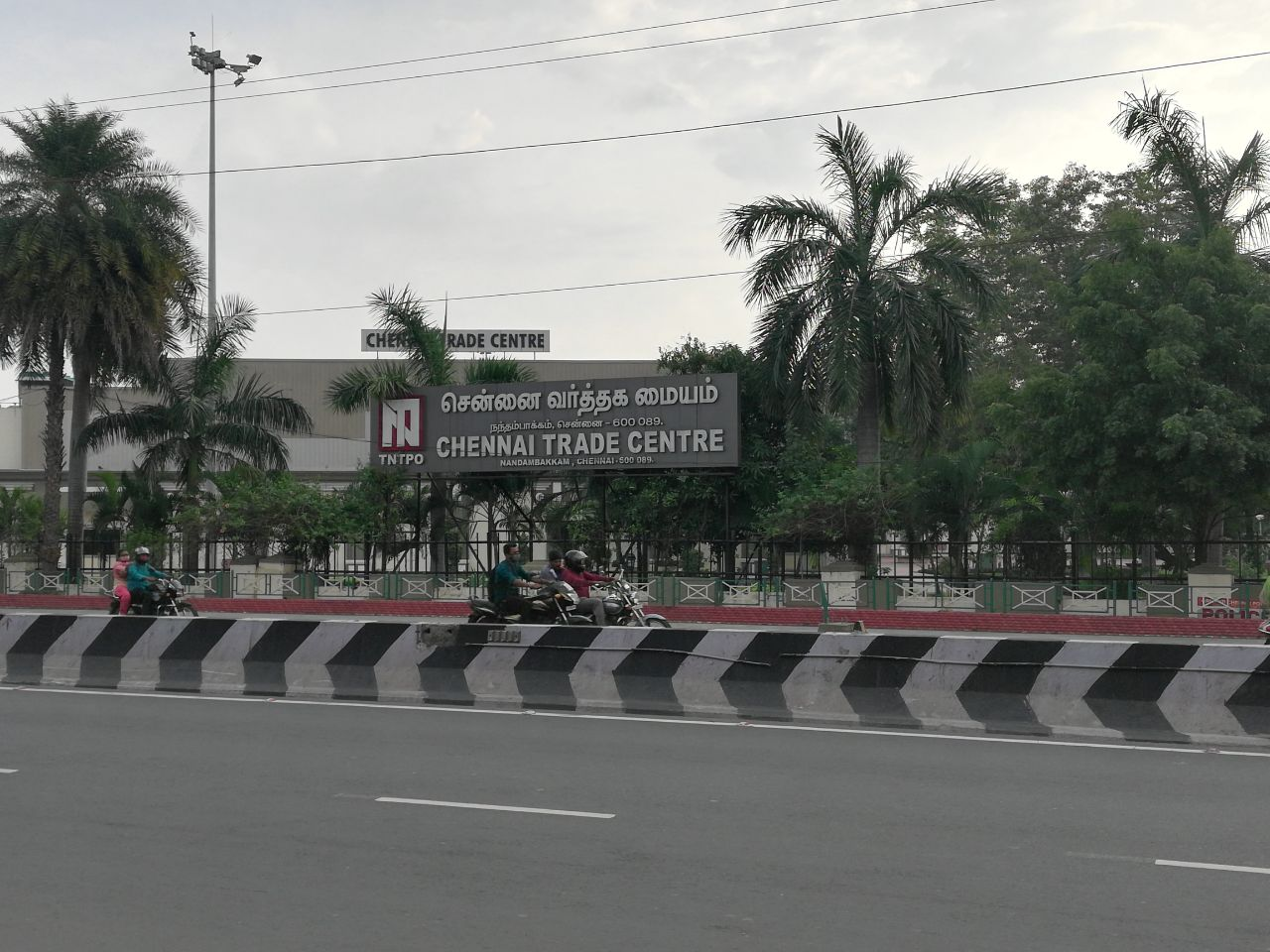
Chennai Trade Center in January 2021

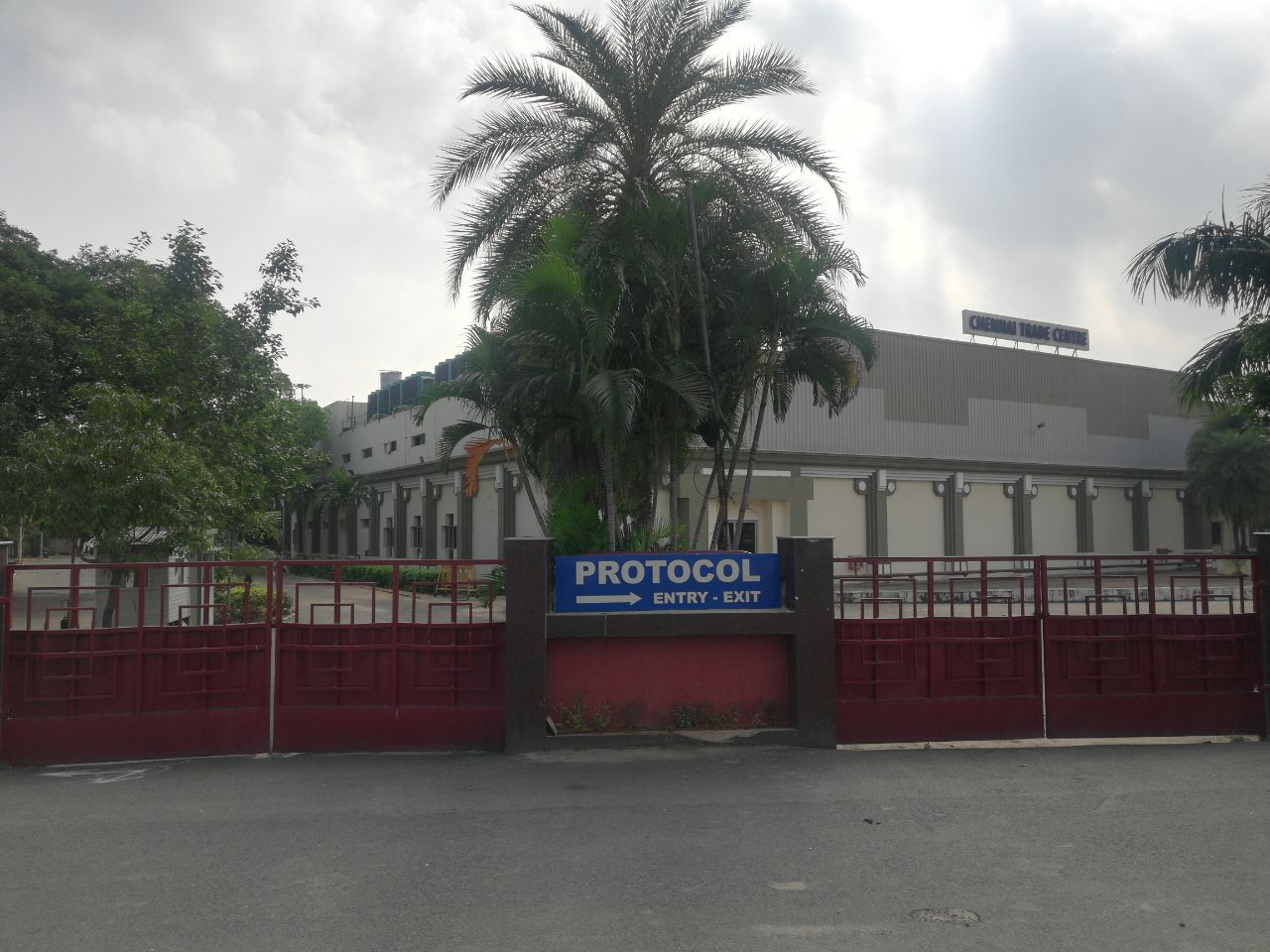
Chennai Trade Center Entrance

The Trade Centre is 6,714 m^{2} which includes a multi-purpose hall of 1,900 m^{2}, a stage of 500 m^{2}, a banquet hall of 750 m^{2}, a lounge of 269 m^{2}, and business and meeting rooms. The multi-purpose hall can accommodate 1,500 people. The open plaza at the entrance is about 800 m^{2} with a uniquely designed porch. There are also VIP lounges/rest rooms and green rooms for the stage performers.

The special facilities available in the convention centre are sliding partition, infra-red digital interpretation systems, theatrical lighting system, fire protections with sprinklers and smoke detectors, modern audio and video system, meeting rooms, banquet hall, protocol and VIP lounge, business centre, information booth, parking facilities, multiple screen backdrops with cyclorama screen and multiple interpretation facility for 1+5 languages, video projector facility, integrated remote control for stage lightings, video and audio.

The Chennai Convention Centre, with 67,000 sq ft of air-conditioned space and 75,000 sq ft of lawns, provides conferencing and banqueting space ranging from 250 sq ft to 20,000 sq ft to accommodate 25 to 2,000 persons.

Other features of the Trade Centre include a couple of 1,000 kVA transformers with a couple of HT feeders and 100% stand-by generators, 200 lines with Department of Telecom (DoT) exchange for telephone facilities, heavy-duty flooring with a bearing capacity of approximately 5 tonnes per square metre and a sewage treatment plant.

In 2009, 135 events were held at the venue and the three halls and convention centre were used for 279 days in the year. In 2010, 84 exhibitions and 107 conventions were held occupying 357 days as against a solitary show in 2001. As of 2020, the occupancy rate is 75 percent, which is the highest in the country.

The annual international leather fair is a permanent fixture at the exhibition centre.

The performance of the exhibition centre is shown in the table below:

Year	Number of events	Number of occupancy days	Total area (in m^{2})	Revenue (in crore ₹)
2001-02	18	88	43,211	3.1472
2002-03	28	125	2,41,866	5.1229
2003-04	35	156	4,33,072	6.1758
2004-05	41	220	6,06,254	7.2865
2005-06	38	217	5,74,583	6.9771
2006-07	80	250		2006-07

From the day of its inception till March 2005, the convention centre hosted 25 events with an occupancy days of 38 generating a revenue of ₹ 70.21 lakhs. During 2005–06, it hosted 80 events with 130 occupancy days generating a revenue of ₹ 2.3473 crore.

== Expansion plans ==
ITPO has acquired an additional 10 acres of land from the Tamil Nadu government for the expansion of the Chennai Trade Centre. There are plans to add about 10,000 m^{2} with two more halls and to double the exhibition area at a cost of ₹ 1000 million.

Former Deputy Chief Minister M K Stalin launched the ₹ 2500 million expansion work of the Chennai Trade Centre on 26 February 2011. The expansion work will commence in July 2011 and will be completed in March 2013. It includes the construction of six air-conditioned exhibition halls, each on 66,000 sq ft, on each of the two floors, and a basement parking facility of 74,000 sq ft with a capacity to accommodate 2,000 cars and an equal number of two-wheelers. Taamaesek Engineering Consortium have been appointed consultants for the expansion work.

As of 2020, the Tamil Nadu Trade Promotion Organisation (TNTPO) is in the process of doubling the centre's capacity at a cost of ₹ 2890 million to 40,000 sq m. An additional 9.5 acres of land will be added in the expansion. It will have a convention hall to seat 4,000 people and a multi-level car parking to accommodate 1,000 cars. The process is expected to be completed in 18 months.

== See also ==
- Economy of Chennai
- World Trade Center, Chennai
