= Velveeswarar Temple, Valasaravakkam =

Velveeswarar Temple

Religion
- Affiliation: Hinduism
- District: Chennai
- Deity: Lord (Shiva)

Location
- Location: Valasaravakkam
- State: Tamil Nadu
- Country: India
- Interactive map of Velveeswarar Temple
- Coordinates: 13.04151°N 80.17766°E

Velveeswarar Temple, also known as Agasteeswarar Temple, is a Hindu temple in Chennai, India. Situated adjoining the Arcot Road in the neighbourhood of Valasaravakkam, the temple encloses a large pond and is dedicated to Shiva. The temple is of considerable antiquity and is believed to have been constructed by Kulothunga Chola I.

== See also ==
- Heritage structures in Chennai
- Religion in Chennai
