= Alapakkam =

- Neighbourhood
- Alapakkam(Chennai) Alapakkam (Tamil Nadu) Alapakkam (India)
- Coordinates: 13.0490°N 80.1673°E
- Country: India
- State: Tamil Nadu
- District: Chennai
- Maduravoyal Taluk: Chennai

Languages
  - Official: Tamil
- Time zone: UTC+5:30 (IST)
- PIN: 600 116
- Vehicle registration: TN 10 (RTO, Chennai South West)

Alapakkam (Tamil: [aːlappaːkkam]) is a neighbourhood in western part of Central Chennai. It belongs to Central Chennai Revenue Division of Chennai district. It is surrounded by Porur, Valasaravakkam and Maduravoyal. It is part of Chennai corporation under zone 11. Entry into Alapakkam is through two main roads, that is, Arcot Road and Poonamallee High Road. Alapakkam belongs to Sriperumbudur Lok Sabha constituency and Maduravoyal assembly constituency.

== Educational institutions ==
Educational institutions in the neighbourhood include:

- Government Higher Secondary School
- Chennai Corporation School
- Velammal Vidyalaya School
- Sree Adithya Matriculation School
- Meenakshi Dental College
- Seven Hills Polytechnic
- Muthukumaran Engineering College
- Acharya Shiksha Mandir (Ashtalakshmi Nagar)
- Devi Academy School

== Temples ==
Nataraja temple

Nataraja Temple is one of the most famous temples in this area. It is one of the two Nataraja temple in Chennai where Nataraja is worshiped as main deity. Here Maragatha Lingam poojai is daily done two times. People around this area call this temple as Chennaiyil Chidambaram or Chennaiyil Thillai.

Valliserapaleeshwarar Temple

Valliserapaleeshwarar Temple is a native temple of Alappakkam. One of the oldest temple in the region, this temple is related with Vali in Ramayanam. It is said that Vali got the secret powers from Lord Shiva by doing penance here. The deity here is called as Vali-sera-paleeshwarar, which over time changed to Valliserapaleeshwarar.

== Neighbourhood ==
Ashtalakshmi Nagar has 4 main roads which are 40 feet wide and 27 streets which are 30 feet wide. Alapakkam Lake, once a 57.48 acre waterbody in Valasaravakkam, has been reduced to 9.88 acre. This waterbody serves as a main source of ground water in the neighborhood.

== Public utilities ==
- Tasildar Office & E-Seva Maiyam located in Alapakkam behind Perumal koil Street.
- Post Office for Alapakkam is located at Sakthi Nagar, Porur (Off Mount Poonamallee Road).
- Corporation Office is Zone located at Arcot Road.
- Chennai Metro water and Sewerage Board area office is located at No.8A, Gangai Amman Koil Street, Alapakkam
