= Vellavedu =

Coordinates: 13°04′04″N 80°02′14″E

Vellavedu is a village in the Poonamallee taluk of Tiruvallur district of Tamil Nadu, India. Situated 4 kms from Thirumazhisai, Vellavedu is part of the Chennai Metropolitan Development Authority and a fast growing suburb of Chennai city.
