= Maduravoyal taluk =

Taluk of the city district of Chennai

Coordinates: 13.0675°N 80.1632°E

Maduravoyal
- Taluk
- Interactive map of Maduravoyal

Maduravoyal taluk is a taluk of the city district of Chennai in the Indian state of Tamil Nadu. The centre of the taluk is the neighbourhood of Maduravoyal. The headquarters of the taluk is Ambattur division. On 4 January 2018, Chennai district was expanded by annexing Maduravoyal taluk.

== Revenue villages and towns ==
Some of the revenue towns and villages of this taluk are:

- Maduravoyal Firka
1. Chettiaragaram
2. Nolambur
3. Maduravoyal
4. Sivapoodam
5. Thundalam
6. Vanagaram
- Porur Firka
1. Karambakkam
2. Nerkundram
3. Porur
4. Ramapuram
5. Valasaravakkam
