= Karambakkam =

- Neighbourhood
- Location within Chennai Location within Tamil Nadu Location within India
- Coordinates: 13°02′34″N 80°09′42″E
- Country: India
- State: Tamil Nadu
- District: Chennai
- Taluka: Ambattur taluk

Government
  - Type: Municipal corporation

Population (2011)
  - Total: 21,376

Languages
  - Official: Tamil
- Time zone: UTC+5:30 (IST)
- PIN: 600 116
- Vehicle registration: TN 10 (RTO, Chennai South West)

Karambakkam is a census town in Chennai district in the Indian state of Tamil Nadu.

Recently buildings along Arcot road located at Karambakkam were demolished to provide space for the Chennai metro project.

== Demographics ==
Karambakkam has a population of 21,376. Males account for 10,759 people while the female population count is 10,617. Karambakkam has an average literacy rate of 90.47 percent with the sex ratio of 987, higher than the state average of 80.09 percent, male literacy is 94.85 percent, and female literacy is 85.99 percent. 11.33 percent of the population is under 6 years of age. 88.32 percent of the population describe their occupation as the main work along with 1503 female workers.

Schedule Caste (SC) and Schedule Tribe (ST) constitutes 6.89 percent and 0.14 percent of total population in Karambakkam.

Religions in Karambakkam city, 2011 Census data
Religion	Percent
Hindus	88.09%
Muslims	6.55%
Christians	4.71%
Others†	0.65%
Distribution of religions † Sikhs, Buddhists, and Jains.
