= Ramanatheswarar Temple, Porur =

Hindu temple in Chennai, India

Porur Ramanatheswarar Temple
- Location in Chennai

Religion
- Affiliation: Hinduism
- District: Chennai
- Deity: Ramanatheswara (Lord Shiva)

Location
- Location: Porur
- State: Tamil Nadu
- Country: India
- Coordinates: 13°1′51″N 80°9′19″E

Architecture
- Type: Hindu temple architecture
- Completed: 8th century CE
- Temple: 1

Porur Ramanatheswarar Temple is a Hindu temple dedicated to Shiva, located in the neighbourhood of Porur in Chennai, India. The temple was built during the Chola period.

The temple is one of the nine Navagraha temples of the Tondai Mandalam and is known as the Guru sthala (lit. place of Guru or Brihaspati).

== History ==
The temple was built by Kulothunga Cholan II. In June 2022, the Madras High Court issued an order to the Hindu Religious and Charitable Endowments Department on the recovery of lands belonging to the temple.

== The temple complex ==
The temple is located in Chennai's western neighbourhood of Porur. The main deity of the temple is Lord Ramanatheswarar (Shiva) and his consort goddess Shivakamasundari (Parvathi). There are separate shrines for Dakshinamurthy, Bairavar, the four chief Nayanmars, Navagrahas, and Shani.

The temple is one of the nine Shiva temples around Porur associated with the Navagraha. The temple is unique in that, despite being a Shiva temple, it has the custom of offering sadaari and theertha to the devotees similar to Vishnavite temples.

The Sthala Viruksham or the sacred tree of the temple is Vembu (neem tree), which lies on the southern side of the temple corridor.

== Festivities ==
The temple conducts annual brahmosthsawam in May.

== See also ==
- Religion in Chennai
- Heritage structures in Chennai
