= Nandambakkam =

- Neighbourhood
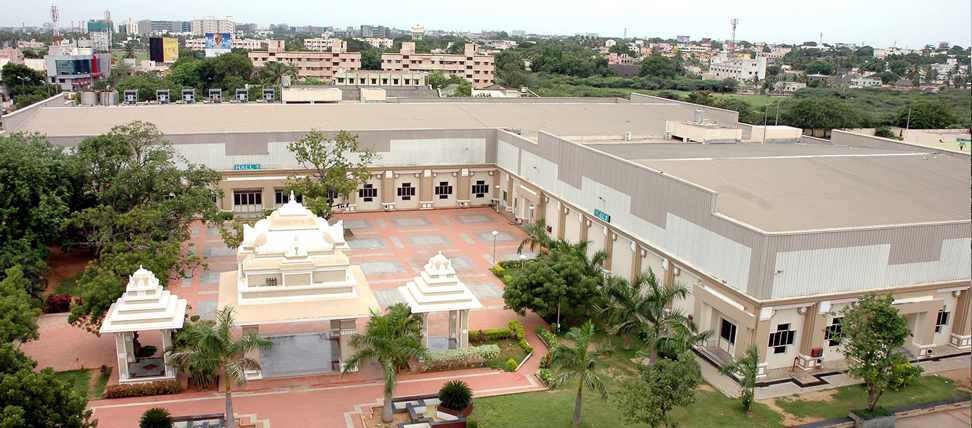
- Chennai Trade Centre in Nandambakkam.

- Nandambakkam (Chennai) Nandambakkam (Tamil Nadu) Nandambakkam (India)
- Coordinates: 12.9824°N 80.0603°E
- Country: India
- State: Tamil Nadu
- District: Chennai
- Metro: Chennai
- Elevation: 67 m (220 ft)

Population (2001)
  - Total: 9,093

Languages
  - Official: Tamil
- Time zone: UTC+5:30 (IST)
- PIN: 600089
- Vehicle registration: TN 10 (RTO, Chennai South West)

Nandambakkam (Tamil: நந்தம்பாக்கம்) is a western neighbourhood of Chennai, India. It is known for the Chennai Trade Centre and the Surgical Instruments Factory. In 2011 Nandambakkam was included to Chennai district by the Government of Tamil Nadu.

== Geography ==
Nandambakkam is situated at a distance of 13 kilometres south-west of Chennai on the Mount-Poonamallee Road. It is bound by Alandur and St Thomas Mount to the east and Manapakkam to the west. It is bound by Ramapuram to the north and north-west and Pallavaram to the south. The township extends from the Madras War Cemetery on the east to the banks of the Adyar River on the west.

== Demographics ==
As of 2001 India census, Nandambakkam had a population of 9093. Males constitute 51% of the population and females 49%. Nandambakkam has an average literacy rate of 81%, higher than the national average of 59.5%: male literacy is 85%, and female literacy is 77%. In Nandambakkam, 10% of the population is under 6 years of age.

== History ==
During the Ramayana period a sage called Pandi Muni was residing here and he was suffering from serious disease. He made penance to be relieved of his suffering. After ten long years of continuous penance, some of which he stood on one leg, Lord Rama appeared before him. Lord Rama guided Pandi Muni to marry and find solace in married life. Following Lord Rama's advice, Pandi Muni married a Brahmin girl called Brinda Muthaayi. They lived together atop a hill. The hill was called Brinda Maala because she made garlands from the flowers in the hill. The name later corrupted to become Parangi Malai which is presently called as St. Thomas Mount.

Knowing that Sri Rama is passing through his place here, Bringi Rishi went and invited Sri Rama to stay with him for few days before proceeding. Sri Rama agreed to be the guest of Bringi Rishi and stayed here. Bringi Rishi created a small Nandavanam (means garden) for the comfort of Sri Rama and the place came to be known as Nandavanam itself, which later changed as Nandambakkam. The neighboring place to Nandambakkam is called Ramapuram, which is said to be named after Sri Rama's stay here.

Textiles and Garments business clan namely "Nandam" have developed this region and thus name "Nandambakkam" has been established. More than 10,000 people were working for Nandam Handlooms during Vijayanagara dynasty (13th - 16th Century) and they were exporting textiles in South East Asian Region.

The village of Nandambakkam has been in existence as a part of the then Chingleput district at least since India's independence in 1947. In 1948, a proposal was floated to settle tappers in Nandambakkam and imparting training in hand weaving to them. The shrine of St Thomas Mount, established in 1523, is located nearby in the locality of Parangimalai.

Later, the growth of Nandambakkam dates from the post-independence era. In 1952, the Madras War Cemetery was constructed on the eastern fringes of Nandambakkam. During the 1950s and early 1960s, a number of social welfare schemes were launched here. During the Chief Ministership of K. Kamaraj, proposals were made for establishing a surgical instruments factory at Nandambakkam with Russian collaboration. This project undertaken by the Indian Drugs and Pharmaceuticals Limited culminated in the inauguration of the factory constructed at the cost of Rs. 52.5 million and expected to manufacture 2.5 million pieces of surgical instruments on 1 September 1965. The surgical instrumentsplant, was later named IDPL, and now the production of surgical instruments was totally stopped in 1994, and a major portion the factory has been closed '

India Trade Promotion Organisation (ITPO)'s first fair infrastructure outside Delhi, the Chennai Trade Centre was inaugurated at Nandambakkam in January 2001. Spread over an area of 25 acres (100,000 m^{2}), the Chennai Trade Centre, a joint venture of ITPO and Tamil Nadu Industrial Development Corporation (TIDCO), was designed to conduct trade fairs in the city.

The area is one of the 163 notified areas (megalithic sites) in the state of Tamil Nadu.
