= Varadaraja Perumal Temple, Poonamallee =

Varadharaja Perumal Temple

Religion
- Affiliation: Hinduism
- District: Tiruvallur
- Deity: Varadharaja Perumal, Pushpavalli
- Festivals: Brahmotsav, 3 Garuda sevas

Location
- Location: Poonamallee
- State: Tamil Nadu
- Country: India
- Interactive map of Varadharaja Perumal Temple
- Coordinates: 13°03′04.1″N 80°05′50.1″E

Architecture
- Elevation: 47 m (154 ft)

The Varadaraja Perumal Temple is a Hindu temple located in the town of Poonamallee, a suburb of Chennai, India. Constructed in remote antiquity, the temple is dedicated to Vishnu and his consort, Pushpavalli Thayar. The temple is associated with the Vaishnavite saint, Thirukatchi Nambi Alwar. The main deities in this temple are: Varadharaja Perumal and Pushpavalli Thayar.

== Temple Tank ==
The Chola-era tank at Varadharaja Perumal Temple in Poonamallee is spread over more than one acre amid fast-developing areas off Poonamallee High Road. The tank helped in irrigating paddy fields and water drawn from the tank was used in homes.

There is a proposal of CMRL (Chennai Metro Rail Limited) to implement the phase II work in corridor IV. A petition has been filed in the Madras High Court praying to stay the Chennai Metro Rail Limited (CMRL) phase II work in corridor IV. It is said that the project will adversely impact the temple and its adjacent tank. Varadharaja Perumal Temple is about 1,000 years old. CMRL is going to acquire part of the temple tank for road widening. It will make the heritage structure asymmetrical and affect the rituals.
