= Mugalivakkam =

- Neighbourhood
- Mugalivakkam (Chennai) Mugalivakkam (Tamil Nadu) Mugalivakkam (India)
- Coordinates: 13.0210°N 80.1614°E
- Country: India
- State: Tamil Nadu
- District: Kanchipuram District
- Metro: Chennai
- Talukas: Sriperumbudur

Government
  - Body: CMDA
- Elevation: 57 m (187 ft)

Population (2011)
  - Total: 25,117

Languages
  - Official: Tamil
- Time zone: UTC+5:30 (IST)
- PIN: 600125
- Vehicle registration: TN 10 (RTO, Chennai South West)
- Lok Sabha constituency: Sriperumbudur
- Vidhan Sabha constituency: Alandur
- Planning agency: CMDA
- Councillor: B.Govindaraj
- Website: www.chennai.tn.nic.in

Mugalivakkam is a neighbourhood of Chennai. It is located in Sriperumbudur taluk of Kanchipuram district, in Tamil Nadu. It is situated 16 km south-west of Chennai on the Mount-Poonamallee Road. It is bounded by Porur on the north, Meenambakkam and Manapakkam on the south and south east, Madhanandhapuram, Kovur, Chennai and Gerugambakkam on the south west and Ramapuram on the north east. The nearest railway station is at Guindy which is about 6 kilometres away. Porur junction is around 2 km away and Kathipara Junction is around 5 km away.

The word Mugalivakkam might have evolved during the brief Mughal rule of Poonamallee during the later half of the 17th century CE and the 18th century CE.

== Developments ==
Developments in Mugalivakkam have seen substantial growth, particularly with the establishment of the DLF IT City in 2007, hosting multinational companies like IBM, CTS, L&T, and Infotech. Additionally, L&T ECC, L&T Ship Building, and L&T Audco have significant operations in the area. Mugalivakkam was incorporated into Chennai city limits in 2011, enhancing its infrastructure and amenities. The locality offers small parks, educational institutions, hospitals, banks, and superstores, making it a desirable residential area. The Government bus service from Arasamaram bus stop connects Mugalivakkam to Broadway daily.

Furthermore, Mugalivakkam is well-connected by road and benefits from proximity to the Chennai Metro, providing enhanced accessibility. The area continues to attract real estate development, contributing to its residential appeal.

== Floods ==
Mugalivakkam has experienced significant flooding incidents due to the overflow of the Porur Lake surplus canal, which also collects runoff from Paraniputhur, Pattur, and Mangadu. This canal has limited carrying capacity, leading to severe flooding in areas like Thiruvalluvar Nagar and Arumugam Nagar during heavy rains, disrupting daily life and forcing some residents to relocate temporarily.

Notable floods occurred in 2015, 2021, and 2022, highlighting ongoing infrastructure challenges and the need for improved drainage systems to prevent future incidents

== Educational institutions ==
=== CBSE affiliated ===
- Swamy's School
- Lalaji Memorial Omega International school
- Pon Vidyashram
- Padma Seshadri Bala Bhavan
- Velammal Bodhi Campus
- Ology Tech School
- Orchid Public School
- Anand School of Singapore

=== State board affiliated ===
- St. Ann's Matriculation Higher Secondary School
- Government High School
- M K M Higher Secondary School
- Swamy's School
- St. Christopher's Nursery & Primary School
- David Primary School

== Health care and hospitals ==
- Amruth Orthopaedic Centre
- Thirdeye Optics (Eye Care) near Arasamaram Junction
- Kedar Hospital
- Meru Ortho Specialty Centre (Kedar Hospital)
- Government health care center
- St. Thomas Primary Health Center
- Nalam Hospital
- Tamara Dental Clinic
- Delta Hospitals
- Good Health Care

== Temples ==
- Aagatheeswarar Temple
- Varadharaja Perumal Temple
- Murugan Temple
- Sri Ayyappan Temple
- Maariamman Temple
- Ellaiamman Temple
- Panichathaman Temple
- Kesava Perumaal Temple
- Jalakandishwarar Temple
- Subramanya Samy Temple
- Eeeshwaran Temple
- Perumal Temple
- Sri Sarvasakthi Agathiya Vetri Vinayagar Temple
- Sri Prathyangira Temple
- Sri Thiruvedthi amman temple

== Location in context ==
Mugalivakkam locality shares its boundary with some major metropolitan areas of the city. In the North and Northwest, it is bounded by Porur. In its northeast lies Ramapuram, while in the west it extends to Moulivakkam. Manapakkam lies to the east and southeast of this tech city, and to the south and southwest, it limits to Kolapakkam.
