= Kundrathur Hill =

Hillock in Tamil Nadu, India

- Subramaniyasvami Hill
- Location within Tamil Nadu

Highest point
- Coordinates: 12.9851°N 80.0929°E

Geography
- Location: Kundrathur, Kanchipuram district, Tamil Nadu, India

The Subramaniyasvami Hill, popularly known as the Kundrathur Hill is a hillock located 5 kilometres (3.1 miles) from the Greater Chennai Corporation (GCC) limits in the Kundrathur taluk of Kanchipuram district, Tamil Nadu, India. The town of Kundrathur known for its Kundrathur Murugan Temple occupies the summit of the hill.

Inhabited continuously since prehistoric times, the Kundrathur Hill has pot burials with stone circles discovered by V. D. Krishnaswami and Ballabh Saran of the Archaeological Survey of India during excavations in 1955-56. The presence of iron implements seemed to confirm Iron Age habitation and the burials were tentatively dated to 1000 BC. The Kundrathur Murugan Temple was constructed by the Chola king Kulothunga I.
