= Maduravoyal =

- Neighbourhood
- Nickname: West Door Of Chennai
- Maduravoyal (Chennai) Maduravoyal (Tamil Nadu) Maduravoyal (India)
- Coordinates: 13.065600°N 80.160800°E
- Country: India
- State: Tamil Nadu
- District: Chennai District
- Taluk: Maduravoyal
- Metro: Chennai

Government
  - Body: Greater Chennai Corporation
- Elevation: 36 m (118 ft)

Population (2011)
  - Total: 86,195

Languages
  - Official: Tamil
- Time zone: UTC+5:30 (IST)
- PIN: 600095
- Vehicle registration: TN-12
- Planning agency: CMDA
- Civic agency: Greater Chennai Corporation
- Website: www.chennai.tn.nic.in

Maduravoyal is a residential neighbourhood located in the west of Chennai, India. As of 2011, the town had a population of 86,195.

Maduravoyal also has a name as "ettam kal" (8th mile), so it could be famous in British Period too, it is exactly 12.87 kilometres (8.00 mi) from Chennai Harbour, and Maduravoyal located 3 km from the west of Koyambedu area which is a major hub of activity in Chennai City. Maduravoyal became a part of Greater Chennai Corporation in 2009 city expansion order passed by the state government. Nearby areas include Nerkundram, Mogappair, Nolambur, Vanagaram, Athipet, Ayanambakkam, Valasaravakkam, Alapakkam and Porur.

The second phase of Chennai Bypass cuts through Maduravoyal to reach the northern borders of Chennai. Maduravoyal noticed a rapid developed and sudden increase in property prices ever since the Maduravoyal Junction with the cloverleaf interchange (flyover) became operational.

In January 2009, the then Prime Minister, Manmohan Singh laid the foundation stone for the Chennai Port – Maduravoyal Expressway, a 19-kilometre-long (12 mi) elevated express-way project by National Highways Authority of India (NHAI).

== Demographics ==
Religious census
Religion	Percent(%)
Hindu	89.47%
Muslim	4.11%
Christian	5.93%
Sikh	0.05%
Buddhist	0.02%
Jain	0.07%
Other	0.34%
Atheist	0.01%

According to 2011 census, Maduravoyal had a population of 86,195 with a sex-ratio of 993 females for every 1,000 males, much above the national average of 929. A total of 10,392 were under the age of six, constituting 5,277 males and 5,115 females. Scheduled Castes and Scheduled Tribes accounted for 13.58% and 0.36% of the population respectively. The average literacy of the town was 77.04%, compared to the national average of 72.99%. The town had a total of 21,623 households. There were a total of 33,208 workers, comprising 234 cultivators, 130 main agricultural labourers, 417 in house hold industries, 29,614 other workers, 2,813 marginal workers, 32 marginal cultivators, 25 marginal agricultural labourers, 78 marginal workers in household industries and 2,678 other marginal workers. As per the religious census of 2011, Maduravoyal (M) had 89.47% Hindus, 4.11% Muslims, 5.93% Christians, 0.05% Sikhs, 0.02% Buddhists, 0.07% Jains, 0.34% following other religions and 0.01% following no religion or did not indicate any religious preference.
