= DLF Cybercity Chennai =

Tech Park in Chennai, India

Coordinates: 13.0234867°N 80.1767158°E

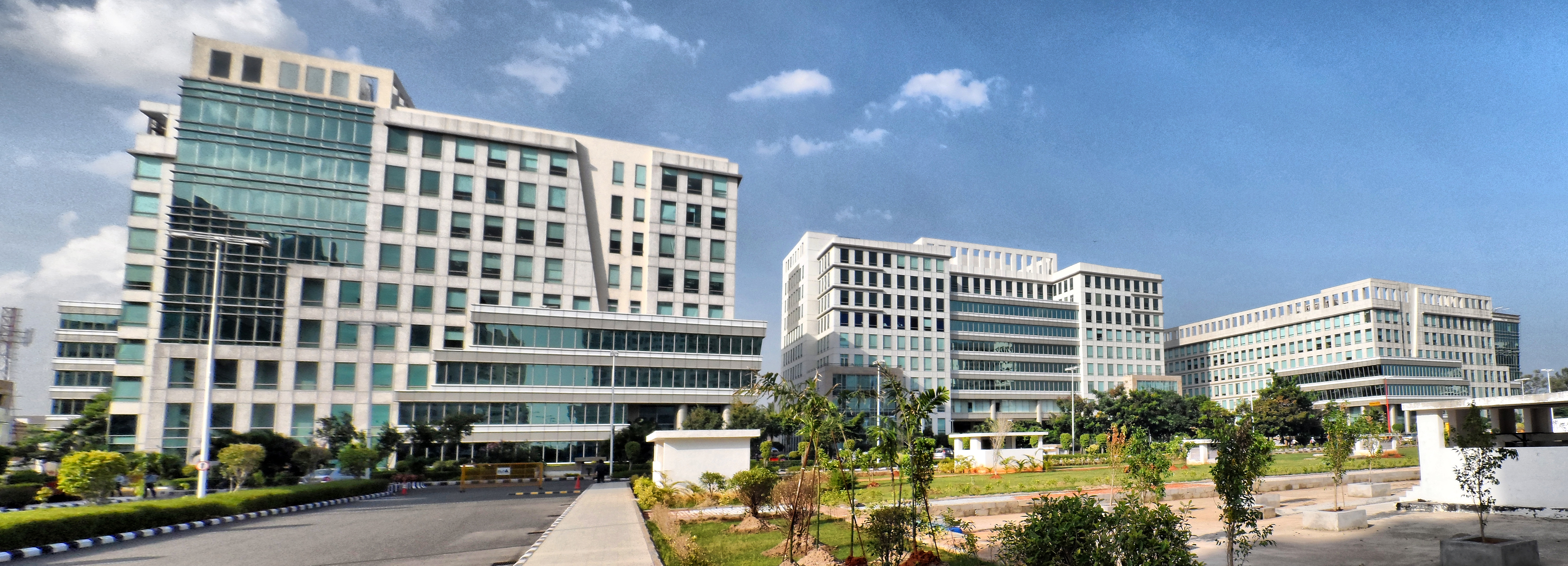
- DLF Cybercity, Chennai, India
- Interactive map of the DLF Cybercity Chennai area

General information
- Type: Information Technology Park
- Location: Manapakkam, Chennai, India, C, Block 1, 124, Mount Poonamallee Rd, Manapakkam, Chennai, Tamil Nadu 600089
- Completed: 2007
- Inaugurated: 3 April 2007

Height
- Top floor: 12

Technical details
- Floor count: 13
- Floor area: 6,600,000 sq ft (610,000 m^{2})

Design and construction
- Architect: Hafeez Contractor

DLF Cybercity is an multiblock Information technology (IT) SEZ, developed by DLF a commercial real estate developer. DLF Cybercity is located on the 100 ft. road, Nandambakkam in Ramapuram, Chennai. It is built on a 43-acre integrated campus with internal roads, extensive landscaping, a dedicated fire station, 4.5 acres of green zone and a 2-acre sports zone.

== Buildings ==
DLF Cybercity Chennai, a LEED Platinum certified development, it is the largest operational IT SEZ in Southern India that is spread over 43 acres with 6 million sq. ft. of workspace. The project has been designed by Architect Hafeez Contractor, constructed by Eversandai using high-quality automated construction techniques. Talking of recognitions, this IT SEZ has been honored with prestigious awards including "Best Private Sector SEZ in Tamil Nadu" by the Ministry of Commerce and Industry, "Best IT SEZ Software export and Employment by Madras Export Processing Zone (MEPZ)" and "Best Commercial Project in Chennai by CNBC". It has 12 buildings within its campus spread across 1.5 square kilometers.
