= Agasteeswarar Temple, Kolapakkam =

Hindu temple in Chennai, India

Coordinates: 13.012202°N 80.150728°E

Agasteeswarar Temple is a Hindu temple located at Kolapakkam, a suburb of Chennai, India. While the presiding deity is Shiva, there are shrines for the Navagrahas or nine planets within the temple complex. The Hindu sage Agastya is believed to have worshipped Shiva at this place.
