= Chennai Zero Point =

Chennai Zero Point is a milestone half way on Muthuswamy Bridge between Rajiv Gandhi Government General Hospital and the northern shores of The Island which marks the Kilometre zero of Chennai city.

== Distances to important places ==
=== Along the Grand Southern Trunk Road ===
- Government Estate metro station 2.10 kilometres (1.30 miles)
- LIC Building 3.20 kilometres (1.99 miles)
- Anna Flyover 6.20 kilometres (3.85 miles)
- Teynampet Signal 8.20 kilometres (5.10 miles)
- Saidapet - 12.20 kilometres (7.58 miles)
- Kathipara Junction - 14.60 kilometres (9.07 miles)
- Chennai Airport - 19.70 kilometres (12.24 miles)
- Tambaram 28.00 kilometres (17.40 miles)
- Chengalpattu 60.00 kilometres (37.28 miles)
- Vikravandi 154.00 kilometres (95.69 miles)
- Ulundurpettai 198.00 kilometres (123.03 miles)
- Tiruchirapalli 332.00 kilometres (206.30 miles)
