= Poonamallee =

Neighbourhood in Tiruvallur district, Tamil Nadu, India

Poonamallee Poovirundhavalli
- suburb of Chennai
- Nickname: Poovai
- Poonamallee (Chennai) Poonamallee (Tamil Nadu) Poonamallee (India)
- Coordinates: 13.047300°N 80.094500°E
- Country: India
- State: Tamil Nadu
- District: Tiruvallur
- Metro: Chennai

Government
  - Type: Municipality

Area
  - Total: 27.53 km^{2} (10.63 sq mi)
- Elevation: 47 m (154 ft)

Population (2011)
  - Total: 60,607
  - Density: 2,201/km^{2} (5,702/sq mi)

Languages
  - Official: Tamil
- Time zone: UTC+5:30 (IST)
- PIN: 600 056
- Telephone code: 044
- Vehicle registration: TN 12 (RTO, Poovirundhavalli)

Poonamallee is a town in the Tiruvallur District of Tamil Nadu, India situated about 23 kilometres (14 miles) west of the capital city of Chennai. Historically, an important administrative and commercial centre and garrison town, Poonamallee serves as a taluk headquarters and is administered by a municipality. Poonamallee has been one of the important transit points on the Chennai-Bengaluru Highway and is connected with Chennai city by one of its longest and well-known arterial roads, the Poonamallee High Road. It also has a bus terminus with regular services to Broadway through Poonamallee High Road as well as Mount-Poonamallee Road to Kathipara Junction and Anna Salai thereafter. Rapid growth in recent years has resulted in Poonamallee's assimilation into the Chennai Metropolitan Area of which it forms a prominent part. As of 2011, the town had a population of 60,607.

The town of Poonamallee dates from the Chola period though it became a place of significance only during the twilight of the Vijayanagar Empire when it served as the residence of a provincial governor (Nayak). The Nayak of Poonamallee was a representative of the Vijayanagar kingdom in its negotiations with the British East India Company in 1639 which concluded in the grant of the village of Madraspatnam to the Company and the establishment of the English settlement of Fort St. George. As the British built their empire, they set up a cantonment alongside the zamindari town with a fort, church, barracks, schools and a dispensary.

Until 1997, Poonamallee was part of the Sriperumbudur taluk of Chingleput district. When the district was bifurcated in 1997, Poonamallee became part of Tiruvallur district and a separate Poonamallee taluk was carved out.

== Location ==
Poonamallee is situated at a distance of 22 kilometres (14 miles) from Chennai Central railway station and about 18 kilometres (11 miles) west of the Bay of Bengal coast at Marina Beach. It is located at the end of the Mount-Poonamallee Road, Poonamalle High Road and Pallavaram-Kundrathur-Poonamallee Road, 12 kilometres (7.5 miles) from Kathipara Junction and 13 kilometres (8.1 miles) from Chennai Mofussil Bus Terminus on the Chennai bypass. The nearest railway station is at Avadi (9 kilometres (5.6 miles)) while the nearest railway station within Chennai metropolitan limits are Guindy and Kodambakkam, both 13 kilometres (8.1 miles) away. The Chennai International Airport is situated at a distance of 15 kilometres (9.3 miles).

== Etymology ==
The name "Poonamallee" is derived from the Tamil phrase Poo irundha Valli, which refers to "the place with a pond of flowers" or "flower-abundant pond." It is the birthplace of Saint Thirukatchi Nambigal, a revered Vaishnava devotee, whose daily service of offering flowers to Lord Varadharaja underscores the town's association with floral offerings. The Sanskrit name Pushpagirimangalam, meaning "auspicious place of the flower hill," highlights its sanctity and link to Nambi’s devotion. The Varadaraja Perumal Temple, Poonamallee, a significant Chola-era shrine, commemorates Nambi’s devotion and the divine darshan he received from Lord Varadharaja, Lord Ranganatha, and Lord Venkateswara. This place was also called Lakshmipuram and Ulagu Vuyya Konda Cholapuram, emphasizing its spiritual and cultural significance in the Chola era.

== History ==
Poonamallee might have been inhabited in prehistoric times as the Archaeological Survey of India has discovered a number of Stone Age burials in the region around Poonamallee town. The oldest recorded history of Poonamallee, however, dates from the Chola period. The celebrated Azhwar saint Thirukachi Nambi is believed to have been born in Poonamallee in 1009 CE. A Hindu temple in the town celebrates his memory.

Poonamallee rose into prominence as a town towards the end of the Vijayanagar period when it was the residence of the powerful Velama Damarla family of chieftains. There are also attested European colonies from this period. The Portuguese constructed the Poonamallee Fort in 1553 . The Jama Masjid in Poonamallee was constructed during the rule of the Golconda sultanate and has a Persian inscription from the 17th century. Csi Wesley Church and Csi Mary Magdalene Church were constructed by the British during the 17th century.

When the British East India Company acquired a grant of land from the Vijayanagar emperor in 1639 for the construction of a factory at Fort St George, the names of the Velama Nayak chieftain, Damarla Venkatappa Nayak and his brother, Damarla Ayyappa Nayak of Poonamallee feature prominently in the negotiations. According to one theory, the name "Chennai" derives from the name of their father, Damarla Chennapa Nayak and the new settlement was named so in deference to the wishes of Venkatappa Nayak.

In the 18th century, Nayak of Poonamallee became subordinate to the Nawab of Carnatic and was in 1763, attached to the "jagire" of Chingleput whose revenues were assigned to the British East India Company. The Company eventually established political control in 1780 and formed the district of Chingleput in the 1790s with Poonamallee as one of its taluks. In 1860, when the district of Chingleput was abolished and merged with Madras district, the taluk of Poonamallee was also done away with. When the Chingleput district was separated from Madras district once again in 1870, Poonamallee became part of Sriperumbudur taluk. Historically, Poonamallee played a significant role during the Carnatic Wars. The old fort, which no longer exists, was a key military stronghold during this period. In the late 19th century, Poonamallee served as a convalescent depot for British troops stationed across the Madras Presidency and Burma, primarily due to its healthy climate. A hospital with 90 beds was built on the site of the old fort. The fort was eventually levelled to make way for these medical facilities. The town also had administrative importance during the British period, with a resident Magistrate and District Munsif. Additionally, Poonamallee was home to a significant number of European pensioners, mainly retired military personnel. The Poonamallee High Road which connected Madras city with Poonamallee, become one of the city's important roads during this time as the city expanded rapidly along the sides of the road and the localities on either side were favoured by European civil servants and later, the Indian rich, for their "garden houses" and became priced pieces of real estate.

At the time of India's independence, Poonamallee was part of the Sriperumbudur taluk of Chingleput district. As early as the 1950s, Poonamallee was well-connected with Madras city through buses of the city's metropolitan transport corporation with some plying as far as Thirumazhisai. Poonamallee became part of the Chennai Metropolitan Development Authority which was constituted in 1972. On 1 October 1997, when the district of Chingleput was bifurcated, Poonamallee became part of the newly-formed Tiruvallur district and a new taluk was created with Poonamallee as its headquarters. The growth of India's IT industry from the 1990s onwards has considerably impacted Poonamallee town and accelerated urbanisation.

== Demographics ==
Religious census
Religion	Percent(%)
Hindu	75.88%
Muslim	13.34%
Christian	9.03%
Sikh	0.02%
Buddhist	0.02%
Jain	0.29%
Other	1.41%
No religion	0.01%

Historical population
Year	Pop.	±%
1871		—
1881		—
1891	14,948	—
1901	15,323	+2.5%
1911	16,342	+6.7%
1921	17,549	+7.4%
1931	20,340	+15.9%
1941	18,704	−8.0%
1951	20,677	+10.5%
1981	23,667	+14.5%
1991	28,827	+21.8%
2001	42,604	+47.8%
2011	57,224	+34.3%
Source: Census of India 1871-2011

According to 2011 census, Poonamallee had a population of 57,224 with a sex-ratio of 999 females for every 1,000 males, much above the national average of 929. A total of 6,496 were under the age of six, constituting 3,313 males and 3,183 females. Scheduled Castes and Scheduled Tribes accounted for 15.24% and 0.1% of the population respectively. The average literacy of the town was 78.88%, compared to the national average of 72.99%. The town had a total of 14668 households. There were a total of 22,411 workers, comprising 133 cultivators, 226 main agricultural labourers, 576 in house hold industries, 18,084 other workers, 3,392 marginal workers, 29 marginal cultivators, 35 marginal agricultural labourers, 128 marginal workers in household industries and 3,200 other marginal workers. As per the religious census of 2011, Poonamallee had 75.88% Hindus, 13.34% Muslims, 9.03% Christians, 0.02% Sikhs, 0.02% Buddhists, 0.29% Jains, 1.41% following other religions and 0.01% following no religion or did not indicate any religious preference.

== Administration ==
Poonamallee is governed by Municipality of Poonamallee, coming under the Thiruvallur district. Poonamallee Municipality is situated in the West Chennai of Tamil Nadu in Thiruvallur District. This town is surrounded with infrastructural facilities and it is near to visit Chennai Metropolitan Bus Terminal (CMBT). The town's traffic is managed by the Avadi Traffic Police (ATP). The town's police comes directly under Chennai Metropolitan Police department. The town elects 1 MLA to the state legislature and comes under Thiruvallur Parliamentary constituency. The town is famous for its 8 courts including the special courts for bomb blasts. It has gained importance since this court system dealt with the assassination of former Indian Prime Minister Rajiv Gandhi.

RTO: Poonamallee comes under RTO-Poonamallee (TN-12). It is one of the largest RTO in Tamil Nadu in terms of vehicle registered. Previously it was under Tiruvallur RTO (TN20).

== Politics ==
Poonamallee assembly constituency is part of Thiruvallur (Lok Sabha constituency). The Current MLA For Poonamallee Constituency is R. Prakasam (TVK) from 2026 May. The Current MP is Sasikanth Senthil (INC) from 2024 June.

== City ==
=== Landmarks ===
Poonamallee is home to Varadaraja Perumal Temple. The neighbourhood has a Shiva temple which has three inscriptions dating to the 18th century CE. there are three old traditional Catholic and Protestant Churches and a mosque was built and completed by Rustom, son of Dhulfiquer of Astrabad, a servant of Nawab Jumlat-ul-mulk. A Persian inscription dated 1653 CE, found in the mosque reveals this information. There is also a Muhammedan fort nearby. There is also old cemetery near CSI Wesley Church in Poonamallee, which is the resting place of many British missionaries. The bus stop next to the cemetery says Kallarai, which is the Tamil word for cemetery.

== Educational institutions ==
=== Colleges ===
- Alpha College of Engineering
- Apollo Engineering College
- Panimalar Engineering College
- Rajalakshmi Institute of Technology
- SKR Engineering College
- Sri Muthukumaran Institute of Technology
- Apollo Arts & Science College
- Iqueue Technologies
- Sastha Engineering College

=== Schools ===
- Arignar Anna Government Higher Secondary School
- Apollo Vidyashram
- Christ Matriculation Higher Secondary School
- Daniel Matriculation School
- Government ADW Higher Secondary School
- Holy Crescent Matriculation Higher Secondary School
- Jeya Jeya Sankara International School
- Joy Bell Matriculation School
- Kalashetra Matriculation Higher Secondary School
- Karthik Matriculation School, Ambal Nagar
- New St. Joseph's Matriculation Higher Secondary School
- Pencil Park School of Arts, Nambi Nagar
- Sarojini Varadappan Girls Higher Secondary School
- Sathya Matriculation School
- Sri Rani Bai Matriculation school
- St. Joseph's Matriculation Higher Secondary School
- Sundar Matriculation Higher Secondary School
- Thiruvalluvar Middle School, Nambi Nagar
- Velammal Vidyalaya, Senneer Kuppam
