= Saligramam =

- Neighbourhood
- Saligramam(Chennai) Saligramam (Tamil Nadu) Saligramam (India)
- Coordinates: 13.0481°N 80.2014°E
- Country: India
- State: Tamil Nadu
- District: Chennai
- Metro: Chennai
- Elevation: 17 m (56 ft)

Languages
  - Official: Tamil
- Time zone: UTC+5:30 (IST)
- PIN: 600 093
- Vehicle registration: TN 10 (RTO, Chennai South West)

Saligramam is a residential neighbourhood in the western part of Chennai, Tamil Nadu, India. Saligramam is surrounded by Vadapalani in the east, Virugambakkam in the west, KK Nagar in the south and Koyambedu in the north. Saligramam was part of Saidapet Taluk in Chengalpattu district before it was merged with Chennai City and district in 1977.
