= Valasaravakkam =

- Neighbourhood
- Valasaravakkam(Chennai) Valasaravakkam (Tamil Nadu) Valasaravakkam (India)
- Coordinates: 13.04394°N 80.17251°E
- Country: India
- State: Tamil Nadu
- District: Chennai district
- Zone: ZONE 11
- Maduravoyal Taluk ': Chennai

Area
  - Total: 2.97 km^{2} (1.15 sq mi)

Population (2011)
  - Total: 47,378
  - Density: 16,000/km^{2} (41,300/sq mi)

Languages
  - Official: Tamil
- Time zone: UTC+5:30 (IST)
- PIN: 600 087
- Vehicle registration: TN 10 (RTO, Chennai South West)

Valasaravakkam is a neighbourhood in the Chennai district of the Indian state of Tamil Nadu and a residential suburb of the city of Chennai. It is located in the Maduravoyal Taluk at a distance of approximately 15 kilometres from the Kilometer Zero stone. Valasaravakkam lies on the Arcot Road, one of Chennai's arterial roads. It is under the Maduravoyal election constituency. In October, 2011 Valasaravakkam Municipality ceased to exist and the area became part of Chennai Corporation as Ward Nos 149 and 152 (Zone XI), Southern Region, Corporation of Chennai. As of 2011, the town had a population of 47,378. Famous Sivan temple is in Kesavardhini.

== Demographics ==
Religious census
Religion	Percent(%)
Hindu	90.12%
Muslim	3.42%
Christian	5.79%
Sikh	0.05%
Buddhist	0.01%
Jain	0.17%
Other	0.44%
No religion	0.0%

Historical population
Year	Pop.	±%
1981	7,578	—
1991	21,953	+189.7%
2001	30,978	+41.1%
2011	47,378	+52.9%
Sources: 1981 - 2001: G Dattatri (10–11 February 2005). WATER SUPPLY AND SANITATION IN PERI-URBAN CHENNAI – CASE STUDY FINDINGS. Service Provision Governance in the Peri-Urban Interface of Metropolitan Areas. p. 8.; 2011:

According to 2011 census, Valasaravakkam had a population of 47,378 with a sex-ratio of 1,004 females for every 1,000 males, much above the national average of 929. A total of 4,696 were under the age of six, constituting 2,439 males and 2,257 females. Scheduled Castes and Scheduled Tribes accounted for 7.01% and 0.09% of the population, respectively. The average literacy of the town was 86.39%, compared to the national average of 72.99%. The town had a total of 12,278 households. There were a total of 18,485 workers, comprising 117 cultivators, 75 main agricultural labourers, 338 in household industries, 16,379 other workers, 1,576 marginal workers, 29 marginal cultivators, 14 marginal agricultural labourers, 58 marginal workers in household industries and 1,475 other marginal workers. As per the religious census of 2011, Valasaravakkam had 90.12% Hindus, 3.42% Muslims, 5.79% Christians, 0.05% Sikhs, 0.01% Buddhists, 0.17% Jains, 0.44% following other religions and 0.0% following no religion or did not indicate any religious preference.

== Notable sites ==
- Velveeswarar Temple
