= Mount-Poonamallee Road =

Arterial Road in Chennai, India

Mount-Poonamallee Road
- Mount-Poonamallee Road, Chennai in red

Route information
- Maintained by Tamil Nadu State Highways Department
- Length: 16 km (9.9 mi)
- Component highways: TN-SH

Major junctions
- North end: Avadi / Poonamallee
- South end: Alandur

Location
- Country: India
- State: Tamil Nadu

Highway system
- Roads in India; Expressways; National; State; Asian; State Highways in Tamil Nadu

St. Thomas Mount-Poonamallee Road, popularly known as the Mount-Poonamallee Road (SH-55), is an arterial road in the city of Chennai, India. It runs for 11 kilometres from Kathipara Junction to the NH 4 highway connecting St. Thomas Mount with the suburb of Poonamallee. A 5-kilometre stretch of the Mount-Poonamallee Road is located in the Alandur taluk of Chennai district, part of Maduravoyal Taluk in Chennai district and the remainder in the Poonamallee taluk of Thiruvallur district.

== Features ==
The road is divided into two sections. The first section from St. Thomas Mount to Nandambakkam, covering a distance of one kilometre, is narrower than the rest of the stretch and is known as Butt Road.

=== Real Estate development and IT parks ===
Mount-Poonamallee road has been identified as emerging commercial corridor, with increasing interest from real-estate developers for establishing IT parks and office spaces along the stretch. Several planned residential projects along the corridor have been converted into commercial developments to accommodate IT and IT-enabled services (IT/ITES) companies, particularly in areas such as Porur and Poonamallee, with the presence of DLF IT Park and Fintech City at Nandambakkam.

The stretch has been described as potential 'second IT corridor' for Chennai after Old Mahabalipuram Road (OMR), attracting mid-level multinational companies and Business Process Outsourcing firms. Large-scale IT park developments, including special economic zones (SEZs), have been proposed or are under-construction along the road, contributing to its transformation into a major employment hub.

=== Connectivity ===
The arterial road stretch is expected to benefit from improved connectivity with the under-construction Chennai Metro's corridors Red line and Yellow line passing through the road, which has been the key factor driving commercial development along the road.

== Important road junctions ==
- Kathipara Junction (0 kilometres (0 miles))
- St. Thomas Mount junction (0.8 kilometres (0.50 miles))
- Butt Road Junction (1.0 kilometre (0.62 miles))
- Wood Creek County Junction, Nandambakkam (2.0 kilometres (1.2 miles))
- Ramapuram Junction (2.30 kilometres (1.43 miles))
- DLF Entrance (3.0 kilometres (1.9 miles))
- Mugalivakkam Main Road Junction (3.8 kilometres (2.4 miles))
- Sakthi Nagar Junction (4.50 kilometres (2.80 miles))

(0.8 kilometres (0.50 miles))

== Gallery ==
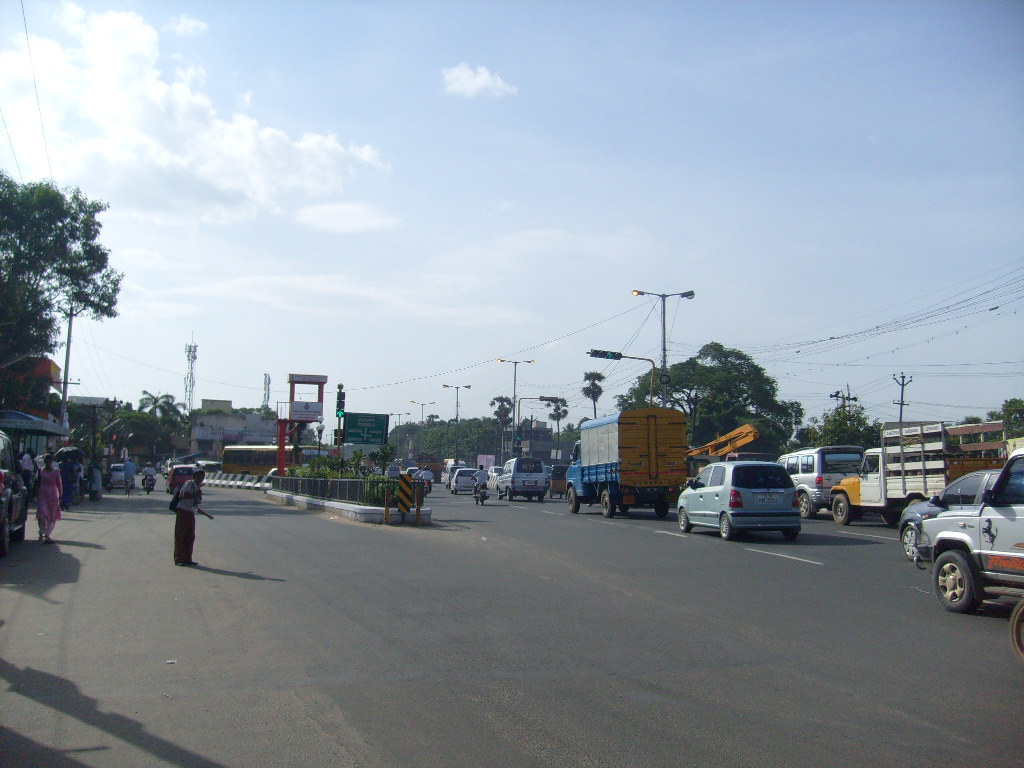
Manapakkam signal on Mount-Poonamallee Road

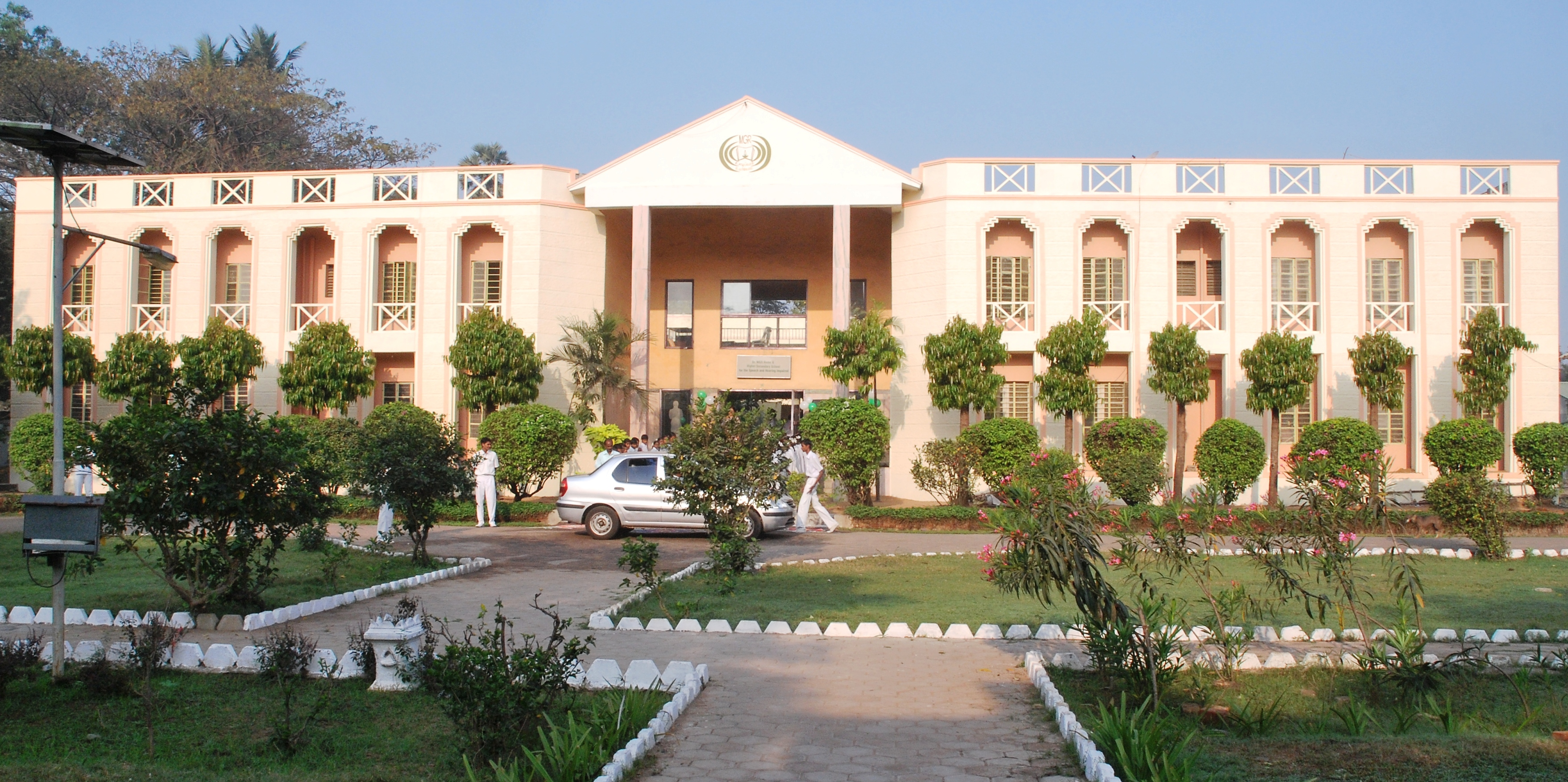
Dr. M. G. R. Home and Higher Secondary School for the Speech and Hearing Impaired, Ramapuram MGR Gardens, Manapakkam

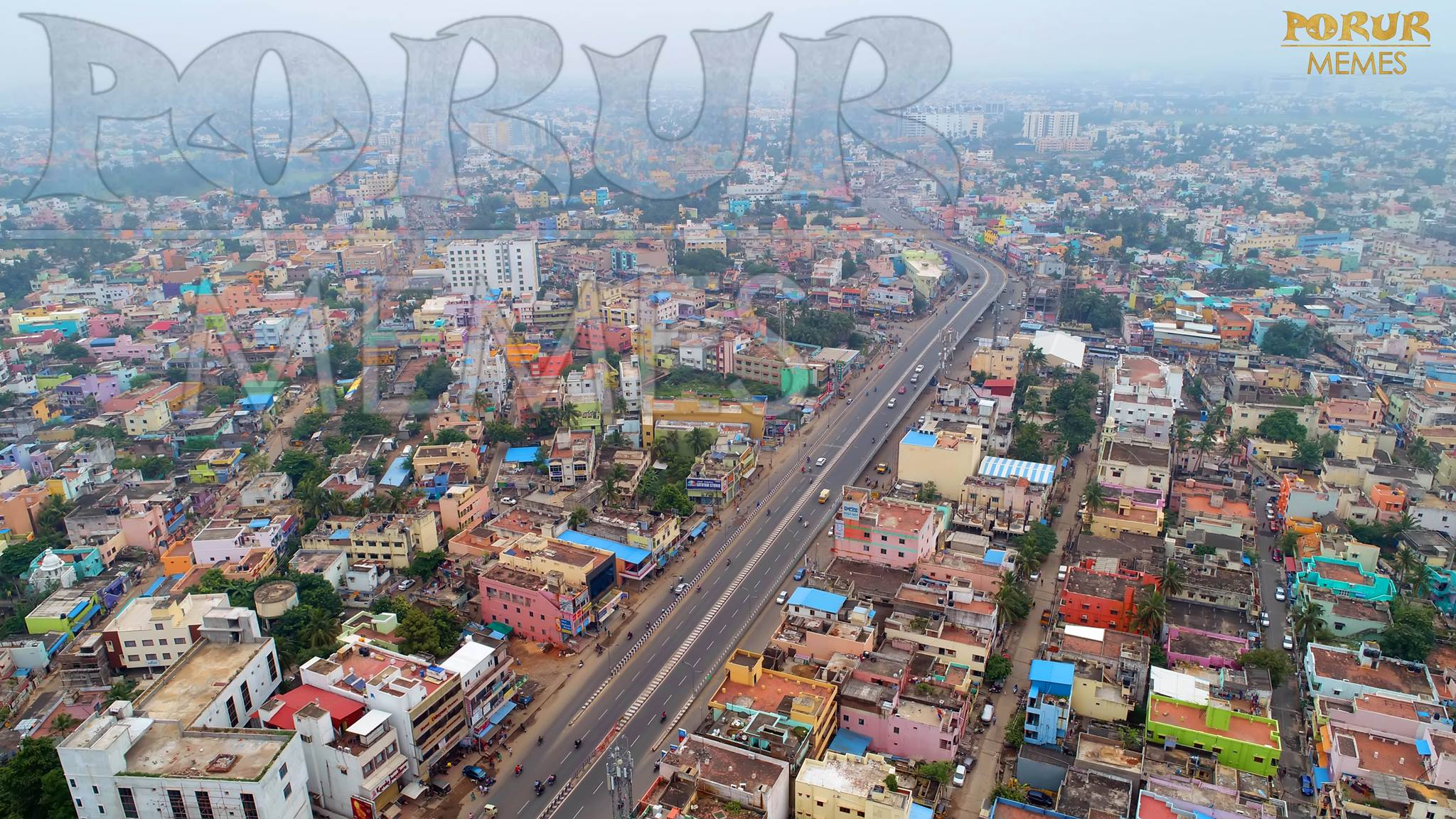
Aerial view of Porur Flyover

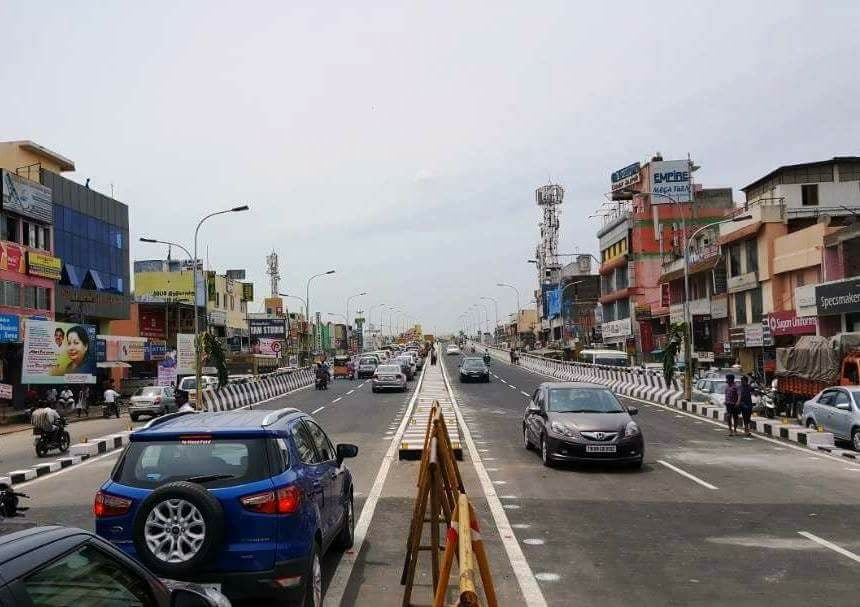
View of Porur Flyover from Mount-Poonamallee road

== See also ==
- Transport in Chennai
