= Poonamallee taluk =

Taluk in Chennai City of Tiruvallur district

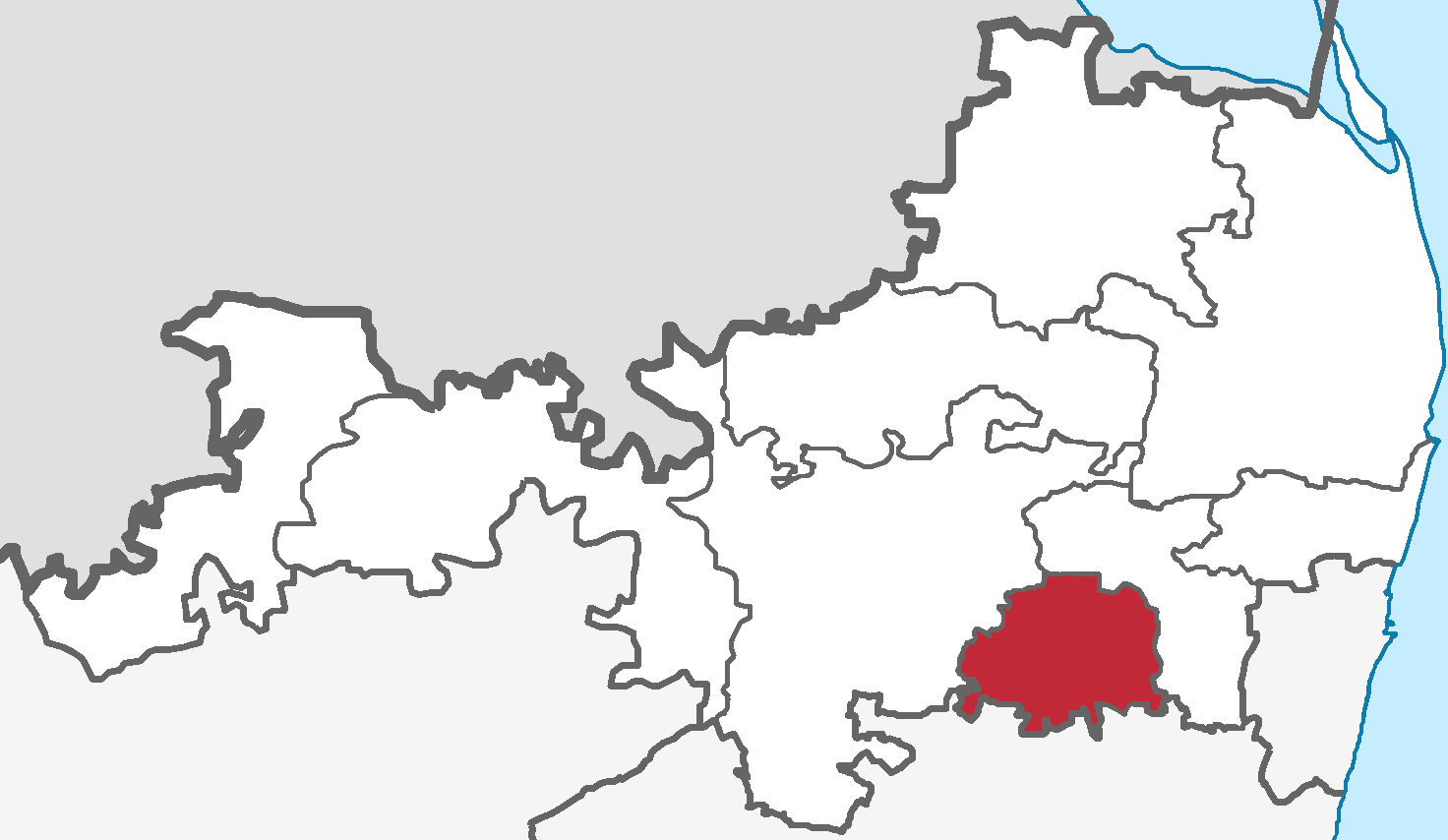

Poonamallee taluk is a taluk in Chennai City of Tiruvallur district of the Indian state of Tamil Nadu. The headquarters of the taluk is the town of Poonamallee.

== Demographics ==
According to the 2011 census, the taluk of Poonamallee had a population of 652,904 with 330,000 males and 322,904 females. There were 978 women for every 1000 men. The taluk had a literacy rate of 78.89. Child population in the age group below 6 was 33,158 Males and 31,973 Females.
