= Ramapuram, Chennai =

Ramapuram Ramavaram
- Neighbourhood
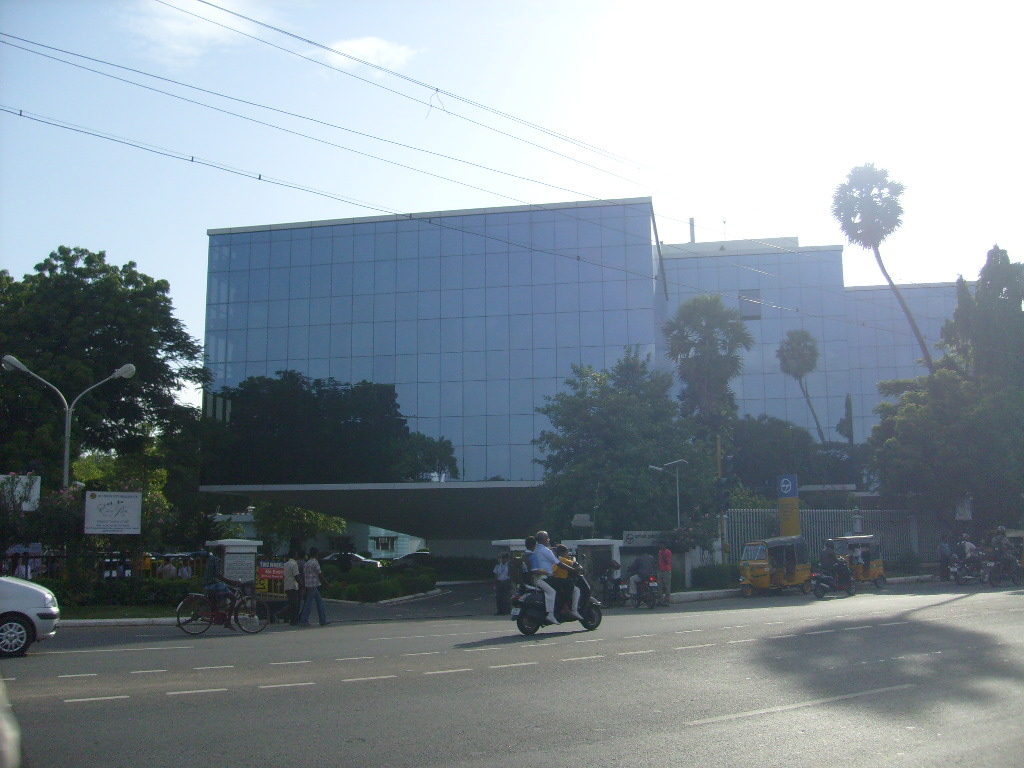
- L&T Infotech, on Mount-Poonamallee Road, Ramapuram

- Ramapuram (Chennai) Ramapuram (Tamil Nadu) Ramapuram (India)
- Coordinates: 13.010600°N 80.193180°E
- Country: India
- State: Tamil Nadu
- District: Chennai
- Metro: Chennai

Government
  - Type: Ward attached to the Corporation of Chennai
- Elevation: 42 m (138 ft)

Population (2001)
  - Total: 30,251

Languages
  - Official: Tamil
- Time zone: UTC+5:30 (IST)
- PIN: 600089
- Vehicle registration: TN 10 (RTO, Chennai South West)

Ramapuram is a neighbourhood in the western part of Chennai, India. It is situated on the Mount-Poonamallee Road at a distance of 3 kilometres from Guindy. Ramapuram forms a part of Maduravoyal taluk, Chennai district. Ramapuram is located at an altitude of 42 m above the mean sea level with the geographical coordinates of 13.010600°N 80.193180°E.

== Geography ==
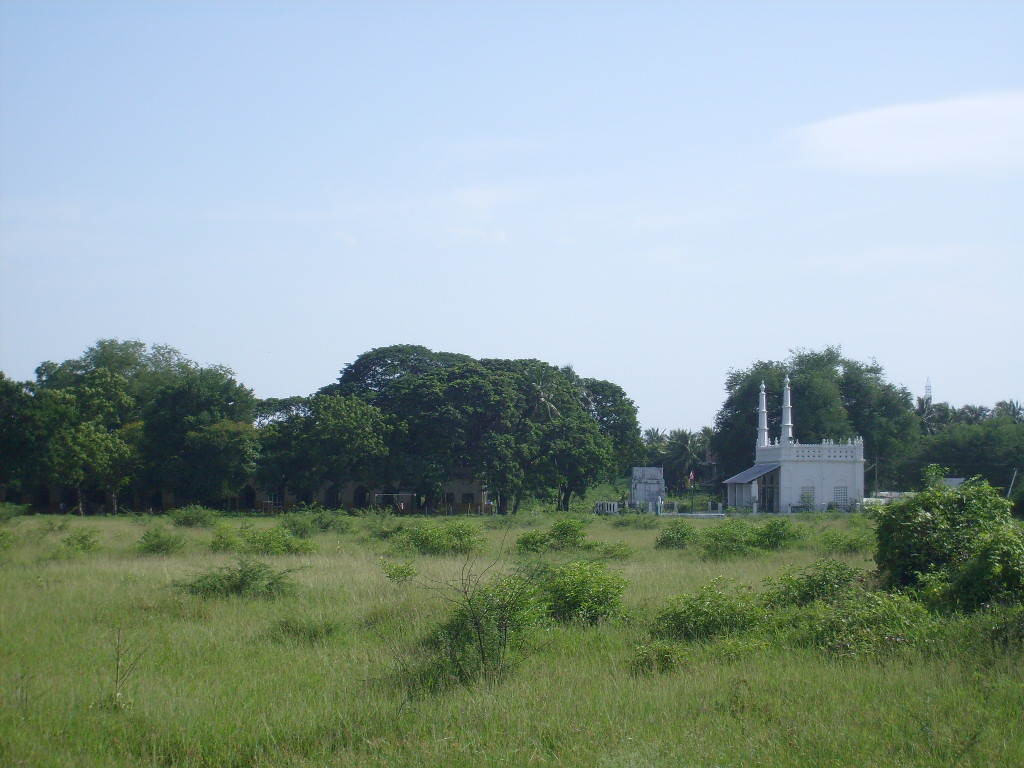
The Hussainy Home for Children, Ramapuram

Ramapuram is part of ward number 154 and 155 of the Greater Chennai Corporation. The former Chief Minister of Tamil Nadu, M. G. Ramachandran's residence was in Ramapuram. The place known as "MGR Gardens" now houses the Dr. M. G. R. Home and Higher Secondary School for the Speech and Hearing Impaired.

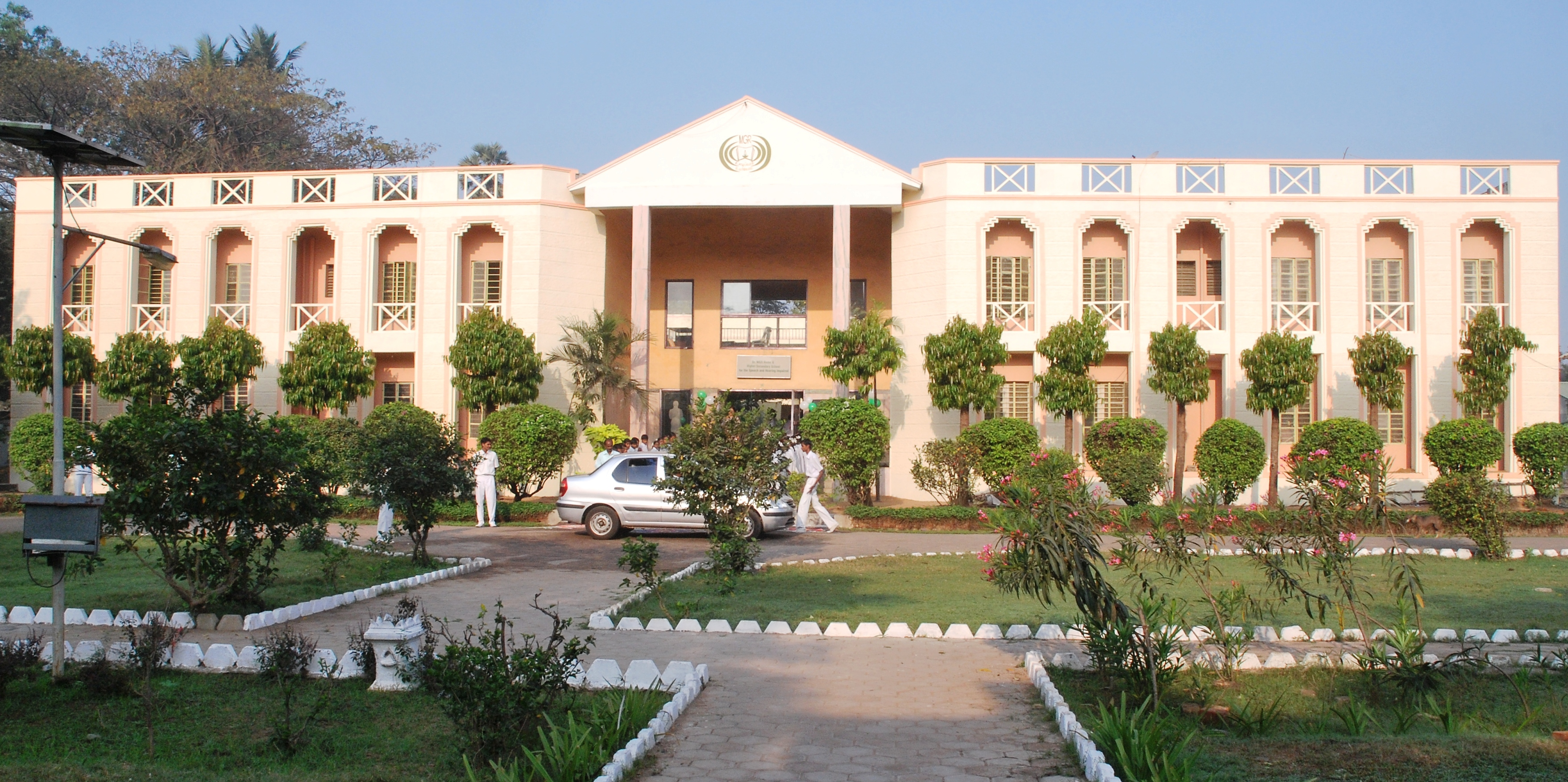
Dr. M. G. R. Home and Higher Secondary School for the Speech and Hearing Impaired

Ramapuram is also famous for Arasamaram Temple which is nearly 100 years old and Lakshmi Narasimha Perumal Temple (Lakshmi Narasimhan idol is approximately 2000 years old). The neighbourhood is surrounded by big hospitals like MIOT Hospital and SRM Hospital. Large organizations like L&T InfoTech, IBHYA, and DLF IT Park are also located in Ramapuram. Educational institutes include SRM University and SRM Easwari Engineering college, which is also located in the SRM campus and is affiliated to Anna University.

== Nearest Railway station : Guindy (8 km) ==
- Buses available to travel between Guindy railway station and Ramapuram which are: 54 series, 88 series, 49 series, 18E, 21E
- From Guindy Railway Station To Ramapuram, Share autos are also available.

== Demographics ==
As of 2001 India census, Ramapuram had a population of 35,251. Males constitute 47% of the population and females 53%. Ramapuram has an average literacy rate of 71%, higher than the national average of 59.5%: male literacy is 82%, and female literacy is 61%. In Ramapuram, 11% of the population is under 6 years of age.

== Places of Worship ==
- Angalamman temple arasamaram
- Kalasathamman Temple
- Nagathamman temple
- Lakshmi Narashima Perumal temple is one of the oldest temple in Ramapuram. It was around 1200 years old.
- Sai baba temple

== Health care ==
Ramapuram is home to several healthcare institutions, including SRM Dental College, SRM Prime Hospital, and MIOT Hospitals.
