= List of lakes of Tamil Nadu =

This article lists the lakes in the South Indian state, Tamil Nadu.

Note: Lakes grow and shrink due to precipitation, evaporation, releases, and diversions. For this reason, many of the surface areas tabulated below are very approximate. For reservoirs, the areas at maximum water storage are indicated. Reservoirs used for flood control are seldom allowed to reach maximum storage.

Name of the Lake	District	Geological Location	Type of Lake	Size	History
Ayanambakkam Lake	Chennai				
Chembarambakkam Lake	Chennai				
Chetput Lake	Chennai				
Chitlapakkam Lake	Chennai				
Chithra Mekha Thadakam Lake	Kancheepuram	Near Mamandur Caves			Mahendra Verma Pallava
Kaduvetti Lake	Chennai				
Kaveripakkam Lake	Chennai				
Kilikodi Lake	Chennai				
Kolavai Lake	Chennai				
Korattur Lake	Chennai				
Maduranthakam lake	Chennai				
Manali Lake	Chennai				
Manimangalam Lake	Chennai				
Nanmangalam Lake	Chennai				
Panpakkam Lake	Chennai				
Poondi Lake	Chennai				
Porur Lake	Chennai				
Pattupalli Lake	Chennai				
Pulicat Lake	Chennai				
Puzhal lake	Chennai				
Retteri Lake	Chennai				
Sholavaram Lake	Chennai				
Thiruninravur Lake	Chennai				
Velachery Lake	Chennai				
Kodaikanal Lake	Kodaikanal				
Ooty lake	Ooty				
Avalanche Lake, Ooty	Ooty				
Emerald Lake, Ooty	Ooty				

Coimbatore

- Singanallur Lake
- Valankulam Lake
- Perur Lake
- Ukkadam Big Lake
- Kumaraswamy Lake
- Sengulam Lake
- Periyakulam Lake
- Narsampathi lake

Erode

- Gani Rowther Lake
- Karuvilparai Lake
- Periyasadayampalayam Lake
- Muthampalayam Lake
- Kadayampatti Lake
- kavilipalayam Lake

Karur

- Dhathampalayam Lake
- Panjappatti Lake
- Velliyanai Lake

Cuddalore

- Wellington Lake
- Veeranam Lake
- perumal nayakan lake

Villupuram

- Veerapandi big lake (500 acre)
- Thirukovilur lake
- Kaliveli Lake
- Padur lake
- Vilandai lake

Vellore

- Saduperi Lake
- Melmonavoor Kadaperi Lake
- Melmonavoor Periyeri Lake

Ranipet

- Kaveripakkam Lake
- Mahendravadi Lake
- Pinji Lake
- Perunkanchi Lake
- Clive Lake
- Tajpura Lake
- Ammoor Lake
- Sholinghur Lake

Salem

- Paniyeri lake
- Mookaneri Lake
- Panamarathupatty lake
- Yercaud Lake
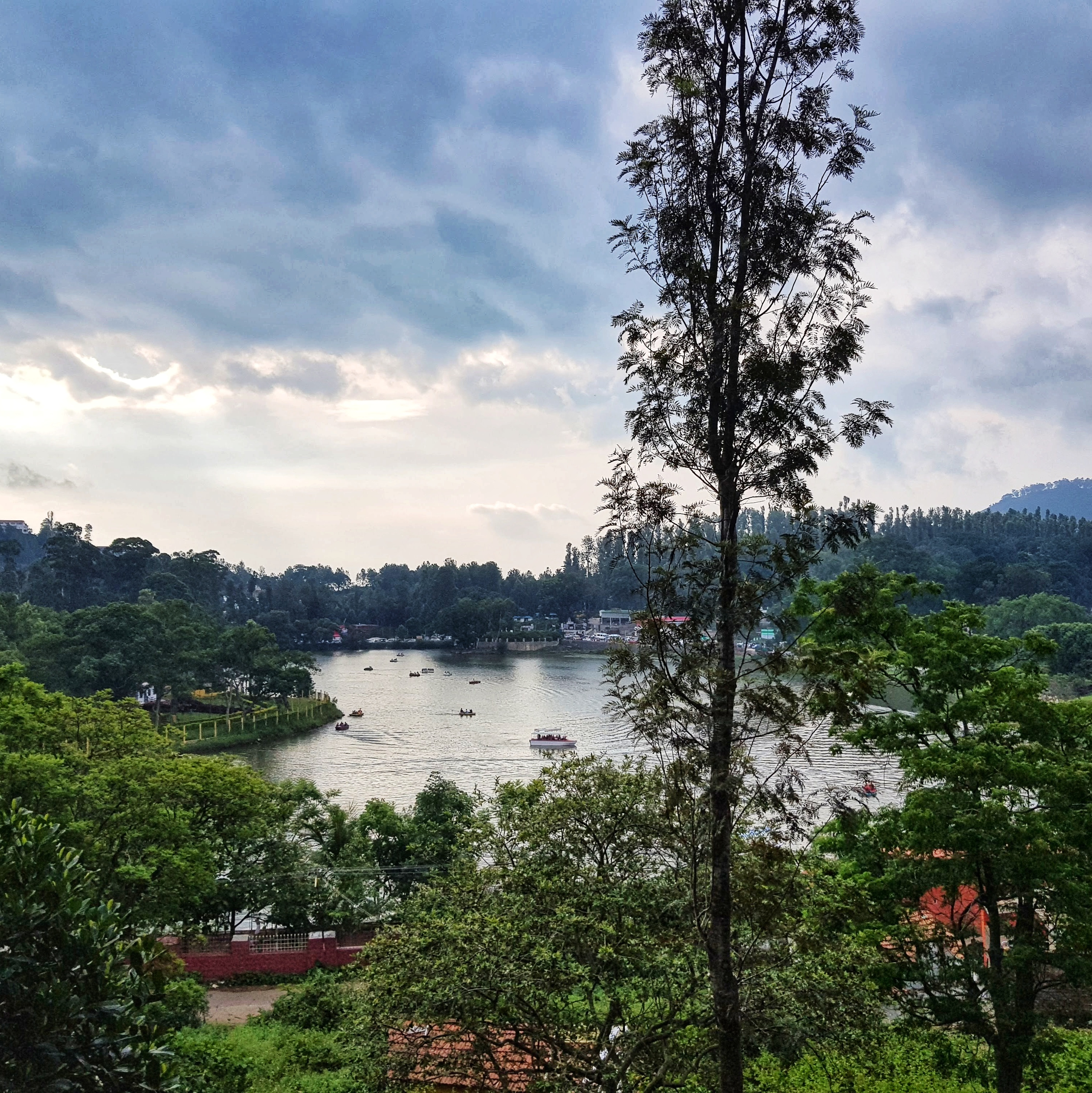
  Yercaud Lake

Kancheepuram (Kanchipuram)

- Thirupulivanam
- Magaral
- Sriperumpudur
- Madhuranthagam
- Chembarambakkam
- Uthiramerur
- Pallikaranai
- Mamundur
- Sirudavur (Sirudavoor)
- Santhavellore lake*
- Thirunelvelai Lake*
- Ponneri Lake

Thiruvannamalai

- Dhamal Lake*
- Anukkavoor Lake*
- Anapathur Lake*
- Kilneli*

Namakkal

- Konneripatty Lake*

== See also ==
- List of rivers in Tamil Nadu
