= Birding in Chennai =

Housing more than 200 resident and wintering bird species, Chennai (formerly known as Madras) has long been a haven for bird watchers. It is one of the few urban areas in India with a diverse range of birds including greater flamingo, black baza, osprey, Indian eagle-owl, Coppersmith barbet, Spot billed pelican and pied avocet can be seen. The following are some known birding hotspots in and around Chennai.

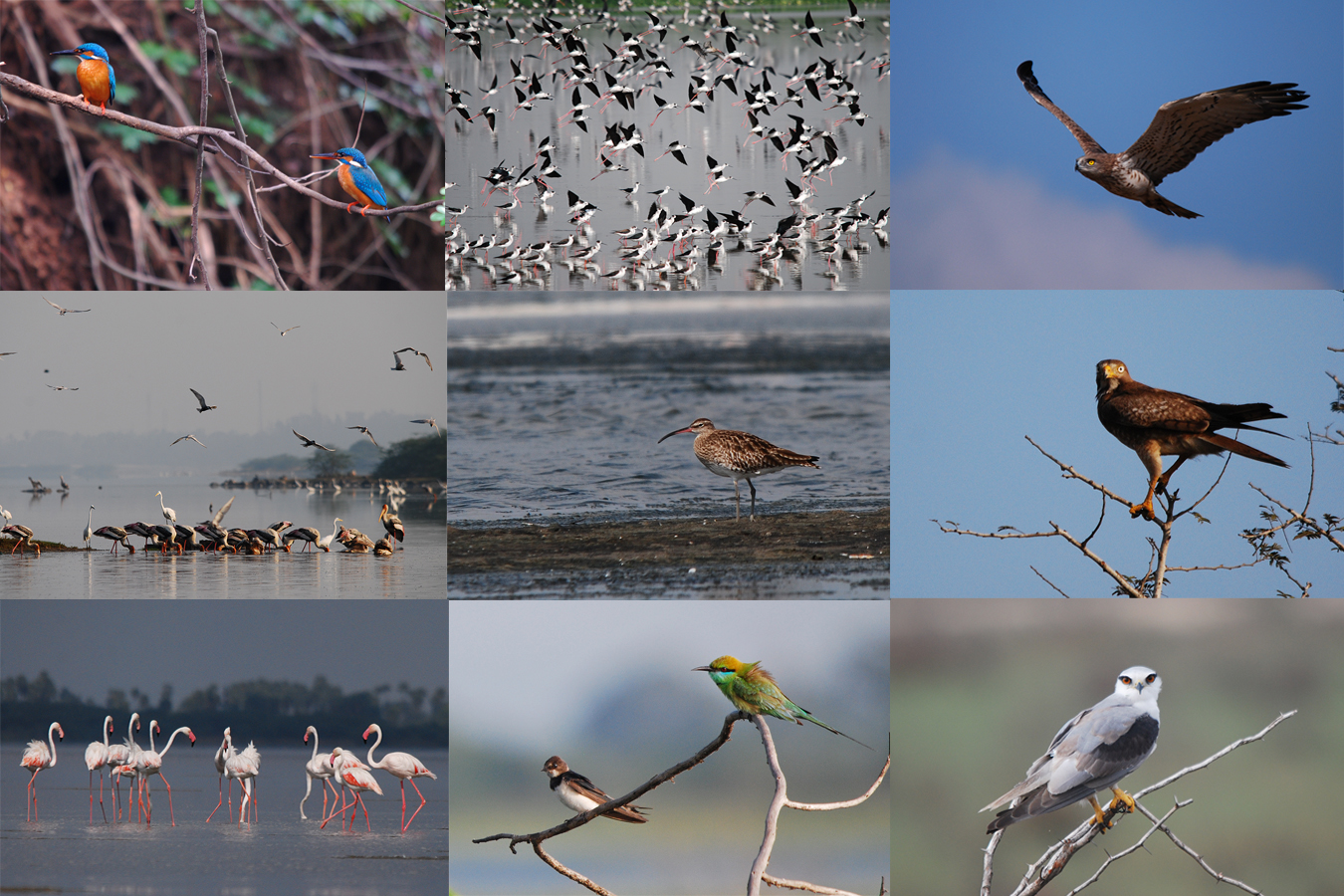
Birds of Chennai

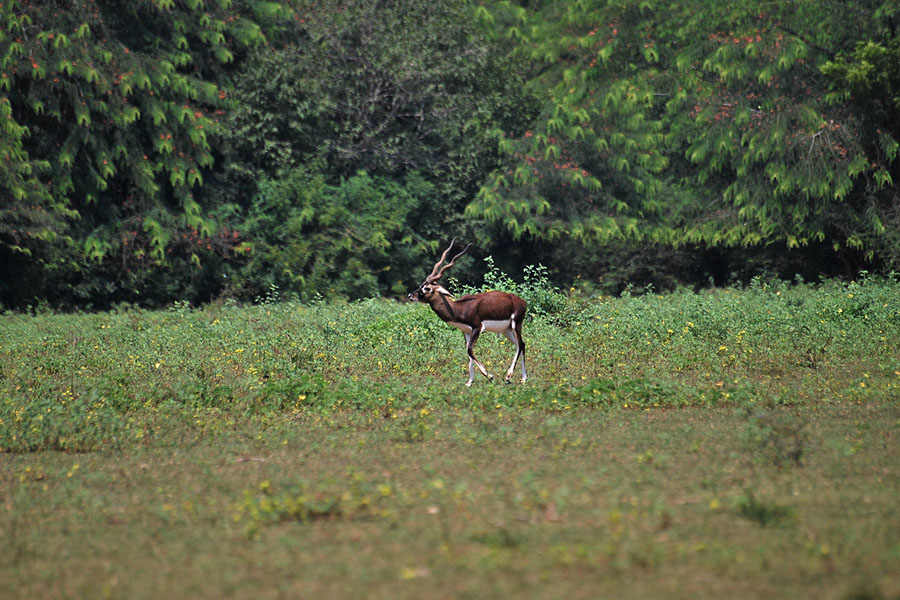
A blackbuck in Guindy National Park

== Guindy National Park ==
Guindy National Park (GNP) is one of India's smallest national parks covering an area of 2.7 km^{2}. It is situated in the midst of the city, and is often called 'the lungs of Chennai'.

The habitat consists of dry evergreen scrub, thorn forest, open grassland and small water bodies. The star attractions of the Guindy National Park are the blackbuck antelope and the Indian star tortoise. Spotted deer, golden jackal, civet cat, pangolins and various species of snakes and butterflies can also be seen in the national park.

Highlight: Guindy is the only place in Chennai where the rare raptor, the black baza has been recorded during winter. The red winged crested cuckoo is another uncommon bird species found here.

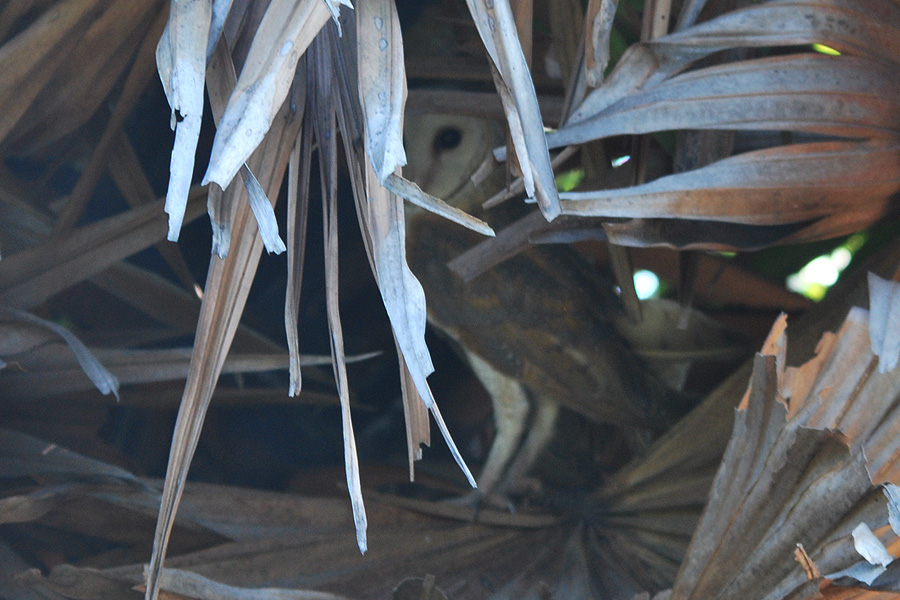
Barn owl at GNP

Over 100 resident and migratory bird species have been recorded so far, the commonest raptors being: Oriental honey buzzard, white-eyed buzzard and shikra. Migratory raptors including black baza, common kestrel and booted eagle can be seen during the winter months. Resident birds include red-vented bulbul, red-whiskered bulbul and white-browed bulbul, coppersmith barbet, sunbirds, yellow-wattled lapwing, Indian robin, lesser flameback woodpecker and spotted owlet.

How to reach Guindy: Google Maps

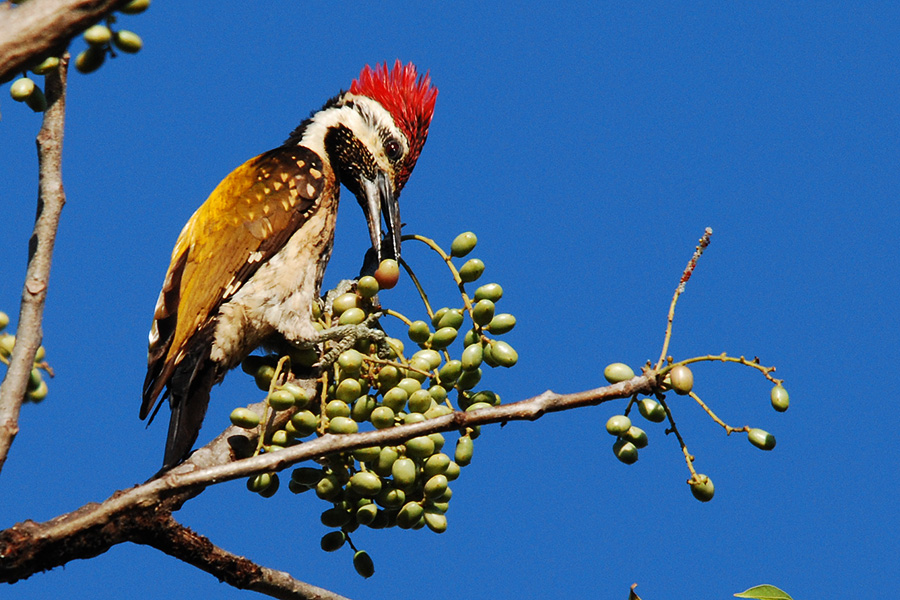
Lesser flameback at Theosophical Society

== Theosophical Society Gardens ==
The Theosophical Society Gardens is one of the best birdwatching spots in Chennai. Being adjacent to the Adyar Estuary, TS hosts more than 50+ species of resident and migrant bird species.

The habitat consists of thick woodland, some fruiting trees, undergrowth, flower garden and the estuary.

The Theosophical Society Gardens has a large number of golden jackal, and housing many flowering trees and nectaring plants. During the winter a large number of waders and other water birds can be seen near the estuary.

Highlight: This is one place in Chennai where the black-capped kingfisher has been recorded.

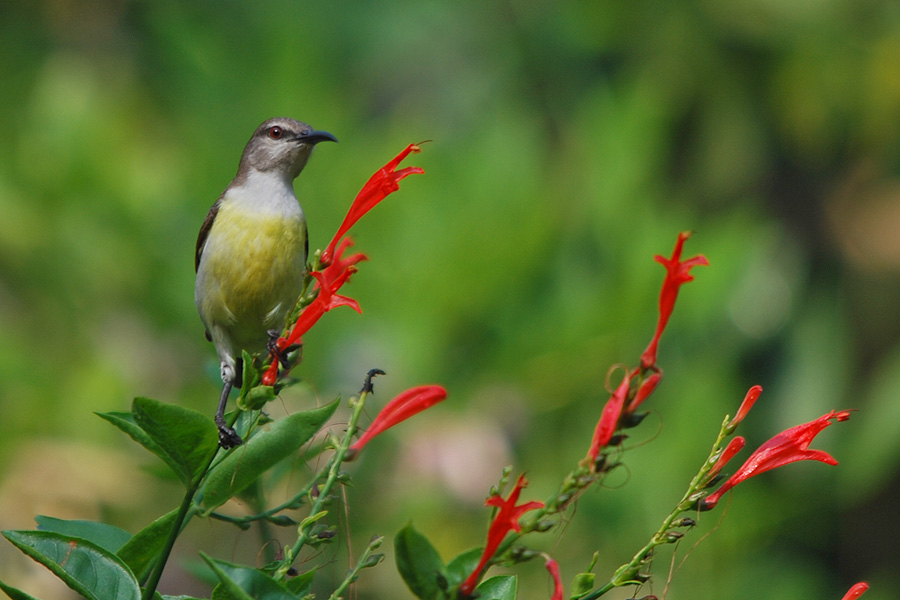
Purple rumped sunbird ath the Theosophical Society

Some of the resident bird species seen here are lesser flameback woodpecker, coppersmith barbet, hoopoe, southern coucal, rufous treepie, Asian koel, sunbirds, yellow-billed babbler, common hawk-cuckoo, shikra, spotted owlet, spotted dove, rose-ringed parakeet, common kingfisher, pied kingfisher, white-breasted kingfisher and Oriental honey buzzard.

During winter one can see Indian paradise flycatcher, Asian brown flycatcher, brown-breasted flycatcher, Indian pitta, Blyth's reed warbler in the TS gardens, and in the estuary herons, egrets, sandpipers, black-winged stilt, godwits and plovers can all be seen.

How to reach Theosophical Society Gardens: Google Maps

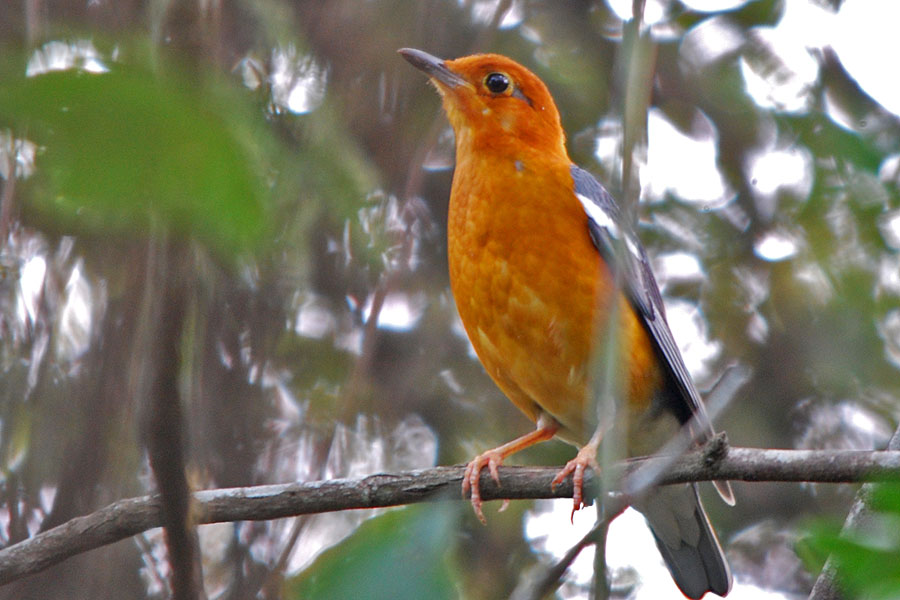
Orange headed thrush Z.c.citrina sub-species at IIT Campus

== Indian Institute of Technology (IIT) Campus ==
Adjacent to the Guindy National Park, the IIT campus has a few patches of well-wooded forest which are very good for birdwatching. The presence of multiple micro-ecosystems in a small area located in an urban environment makes it an ideal place to see many species of birds (up to 50 species in 2 hours during the winter season). Over 100 resident and migrant bird species have been recorded here. Prakriti, a wildlife club run by the students, staff and residents of IIT takes part in conservation activities and helps protect the biodiversity in campus.

The habitat consists of dry evergreen forest, reed beds, well-wooded forest, open grassland, dry scrub and undergrowth. The main inhabitants here are blackbuck antelope, spotted deer, Indian grey mongoose, golden jackal, monitor lizard, snakes, and over 40 butterfly species.

Highlight: The wintering sub-species of orange-headed ground thrush (Zoothera citrina citrina) can be seen here.

Resident bird species seen here include lesser flameback woodpecker, coppersmith barbet, hoopoe, greater coucal, rufous treepie, Asian koel, sunbirds, yellow-billed babbler, common hawk-cuckoo, shikra, spotted owlet, spotted dove, rose-ringed parakeet, common kingfisher, pied kingfisher, white-breasted kingfisher, collared scops-owl, Asian openbill stork, brown boobook, slaty-breasted rail, white-breasted waterhen, purple moorhen, common moorhen, blue-faced malkoha, red-vented bulbul, white-browed bulbul, red-whiskered bulbul and Oriental honey buzzard.

During wintering months one can see Indian paradise flycatcher, Asian brown flycatcher, Indian pitta, orange-headed ground thrush, large-billed leaf warbler, Blyth's reed warbler, and forest wagtail in the IIT campus.

How to reach IIT campus: Google Maps

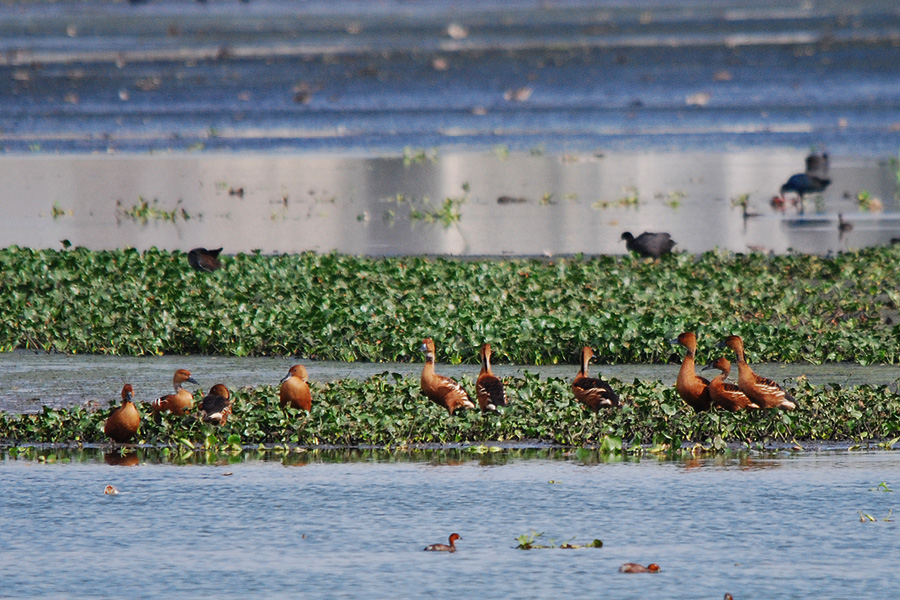
Rare fulvous whistling ducks at Pallikaranai marsh

== Pallikaranai marsh ==
Pallikaranai marsh is a freshwater swamp adjacent to the Bay of Bengal covering an area of 80 square kilometres. It is one of the finest natural freshwater ecosystems in the city. Over 100 resident and migratory bird species have been recorded so far.

The habitat consists of fresh/saline water bodies, reed beds, mud flats and floating vegetation.

Highlights: Fulvous whistling duck, grey-headed lapwing, greater flamingo and waders like pied avocet, sandpipers and ruffs can be seen here during wintering months.

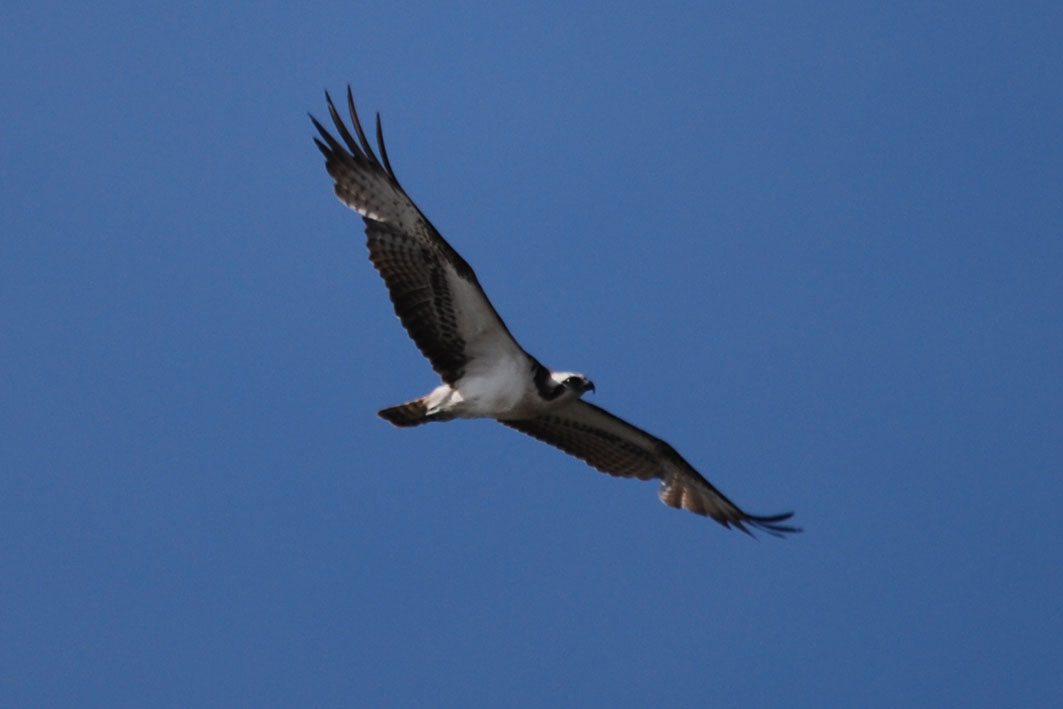
Osprey at Pallikaranai marsh

Resident bird species include purple swamphen, common moorhen, pheasant-tailed jacana, purple heron, black-winged stilt, common coot, Indian spot-billed duck, spot-billed pelican, prinias, common kingfisher, pied kingfisher, pied crested cuckoo, white-breasted kingfisher and grey heron.

Raptors like shikra, black-winged kite, black kite, red-necked falcon, marsh harrier, Montague's harrier and booted eagle can also be seen here.

During wintering months thousands of waders and migratory ducks fill the marsh, which becomes a paradise for bird watchers. Osprey, greater flamingo, northern pintail duck, northern shoveller, garganey teal, black-tailed godwit, pied avocet, common sandpiper, wood sandpiper and marsh sandpiper, whiskered tern, rosy starling, yellow wagtail, little stint, grey-headed lapwing, glossy ibis and black-headed ibis, ruff and greenshank all visit the Pallikaranai marsh.

How to reach Pallikaranai marsh: Google Maps

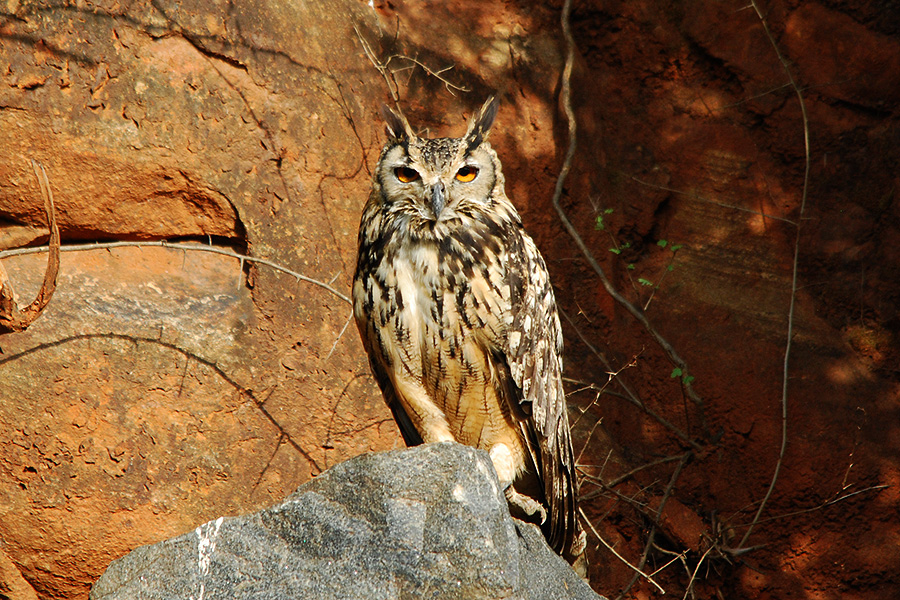
Great horned owl at Nanmangalam RF

== Potheri Lake ==
Potheri Lake is a rain fed freshwater lake situated near Potheri a small village on the outskirts of Chennai. It is situated right beside the SRMIST. The habitat in this place is a rain fed freshwater lake system, grasslands on the East and Southeast of the lake and scrub forests on the southern end. Till now 147 species has been recorded at this lake.

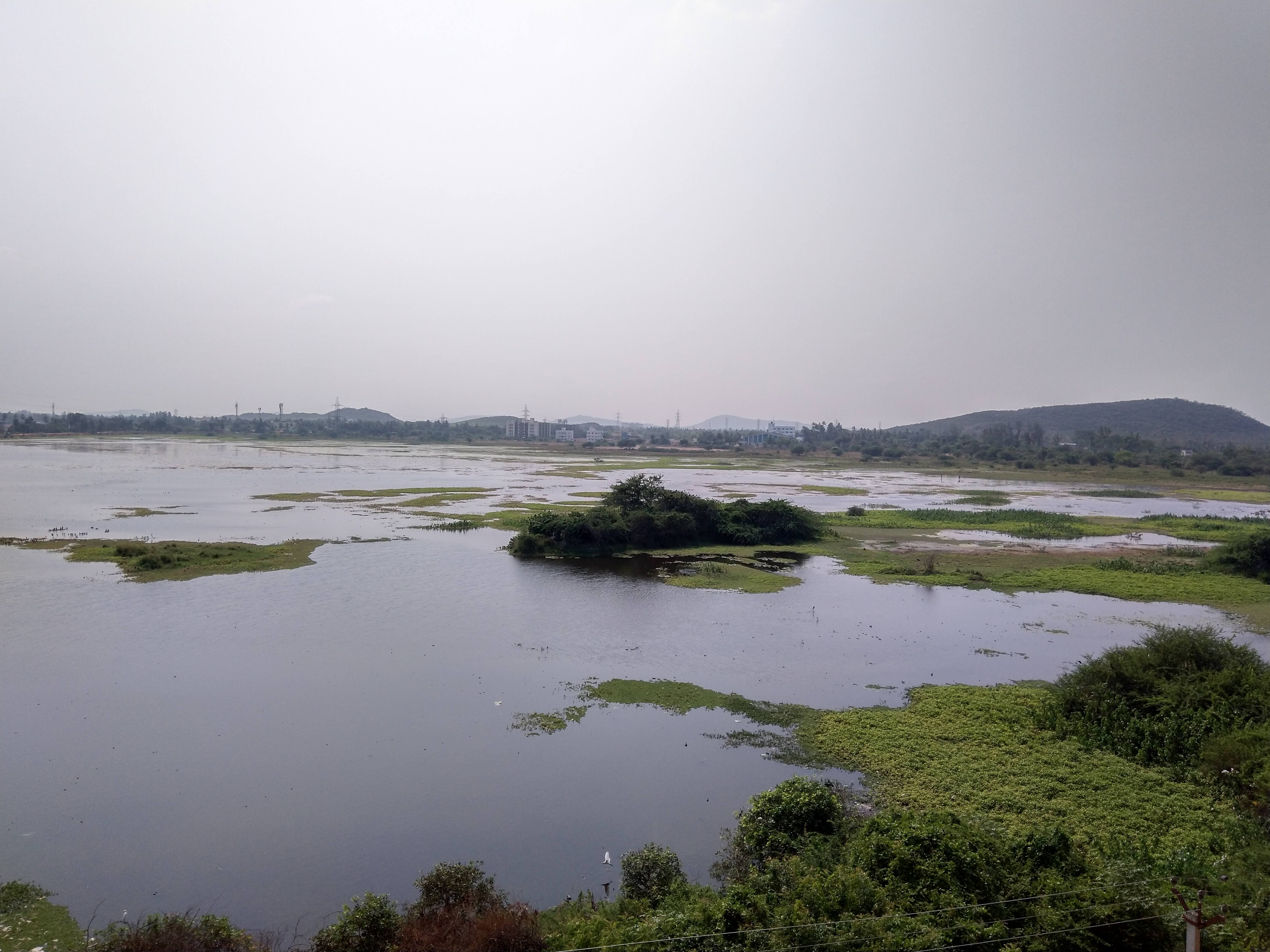
Potheri lake wetland habitat.

The uncommon species recorded at this place include Lesser Whitethroat, Paddyfield warbler, Red-necked Falcon, Peregrine Falcon, Montagu's Harrier, Pacific Golden-Plover, Greater Painted-Snipe, Pin-tailed snipe, Ruddy-breasted Crake, Cinnamon Bittern, White-rumped munia, Red Avadavat, Common woodshrike, Tawny-bellied Babbler, Blyth's Pipit, Richard's Pipit, Eurasian Wigeon, Jungle Bush-Quail, Streaked Weaver, Indian Paradise Flycatcher, Asian Brown Flycatcher, Brown-breasted Flycatcher.

It is situated near to the GST Road and is also near to the Potheri railway station. The location for it is here.

== Nanmangalam Reserve Forest ==
Nanmangalam Reserve Forest is a scrub forest covering an area of 320 hectares. It is the only place in the city where the great horned owl (Eurasian eagle-owl) is resident. It has been successfully breeding there for two decades. Over 80 species of resident and migratory birds have been recorded so far. Nanmangalam Reserve Forest is a very good place for reptiles and insects too.

The habitat consists of thick scrub forest, well-wooded eucalyptus plantations, three big abandoned quarries and small hillocks.

Highlight: The Indian Eagle-owl is the star attraction in Nanmangalam Reserve forest. Orange-breasted green pigeon was seen recently for the first time.

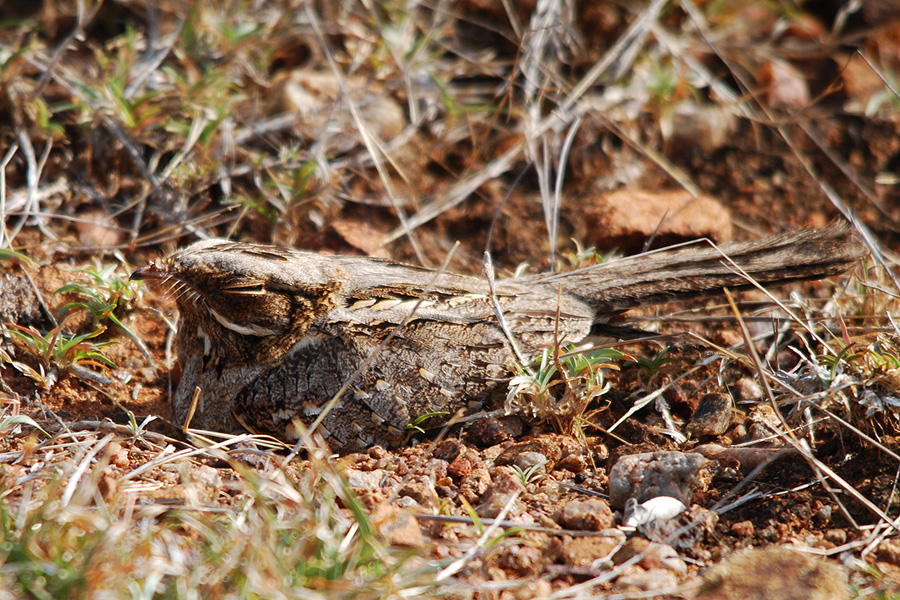
Common Indian nightjar at Nanmanagalam RF

Resident bird species include Indian robin and magpie robin, common kingfisher, pied kingfisher and white-breasted kingfisher, great horned owl, common iora, purple-rumped sunbird, purple sunbird and Loten's sunbird, spotted dove and laughing dove, Indian nightjar, Eurasian stone-curlew (thick-knee), ashy woodswallow, common woodshrike, blue-faced malkoha, common babbler, red-whiskered bulbul, red-vented bulbul and white-browed bulbul, Oriental honey buzzard, white-eyed buzzard and shikra.

During the wintering months Indian pitta, rosy starling, orange-headed ground thrush, Indian paradise flycatcher, Asian brown flycatcher, common kestrel, booted eagle, common snipe and blue-tailed bee-eater can all be seen.

How to reach Nanmangalam Reserve Forest: Google Maps

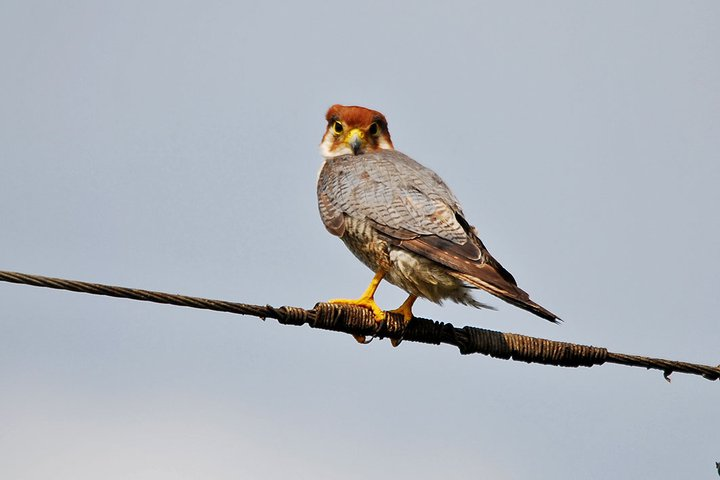
Red-necked falcon at Siruthavur lake

== Sirudavoor Lake ==
Sirudavoor Lake is a rain-fed fresh water lake used for irrigation and fishing. Famous for the fresh water ducks such as Eurasian wigeon and cotton pygmy goose, over 70 resident and migratory bird species have been recorded so far. This is one place near Chennai where both red-wattled lapwing and yellow-wattled lapwing are seen in close proximity.

The habitat consists of a freshwater lake system, open grassland, sparse dry scrub and reed beds.

Highlights: Indian courser are recorded to breed here. Uncommon raptors such as red-necked falcon and short-toed snake-eagle can also be spotted.

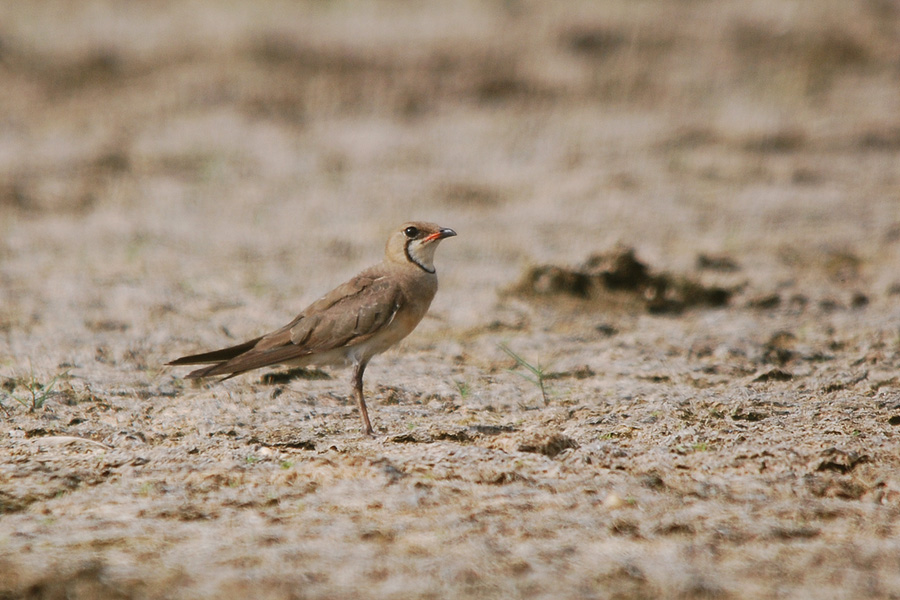
Oriental pratincole at Sirudavoor lake

Some of the resident bird species include little green bee-eater, pied bushchat, ashy-crowned sparrow-lark, paddyfield pipit, yellow-wattled lapwing, red-wattled lapwing, Indian courser, common kingfisher, pied kingfisher, white-breasted kingfisher, little ringed plover, red-rumped swallow, shikra, white-eyed buzzard, red-necked falcon, short-toed snake-eagle, baya weaver, zitting cisticola, plain prinia, ashy prinia and Indian roller.

During winter months blue-tailed bee-eater, common kestrel, yellow wagtail, barn swallow, glossy ibis, black-headed ibis, Eurasian spoonbill, painted stork, openbill stork, booted eagle, Oriental pratincole, common sandpiper, wood sandpiper and greenshank can be spotted.

How to reach Sirudavoor Lake: OpenStreetMap.org

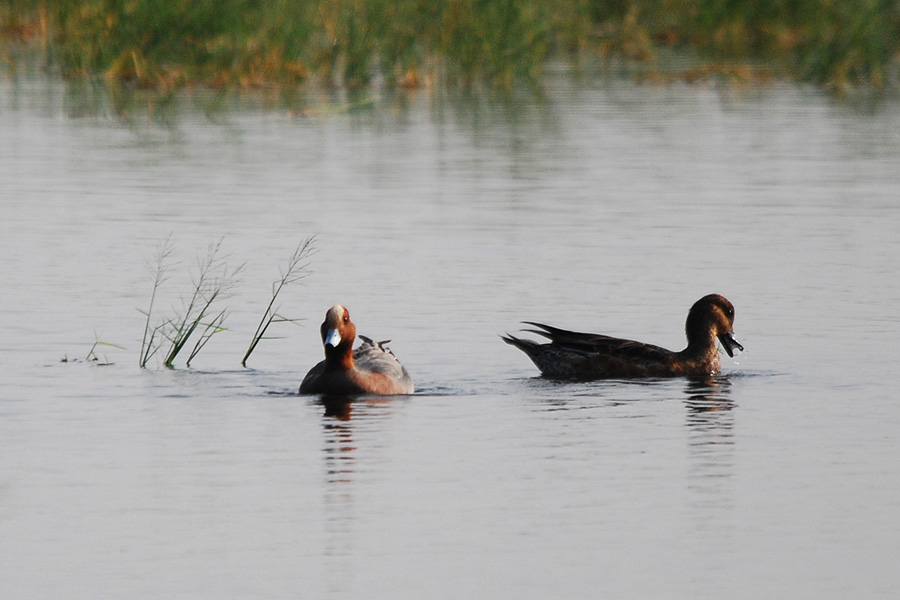
Eurasian wigeon pair at Chembarambakkam

== Chembarambakkam lake ==
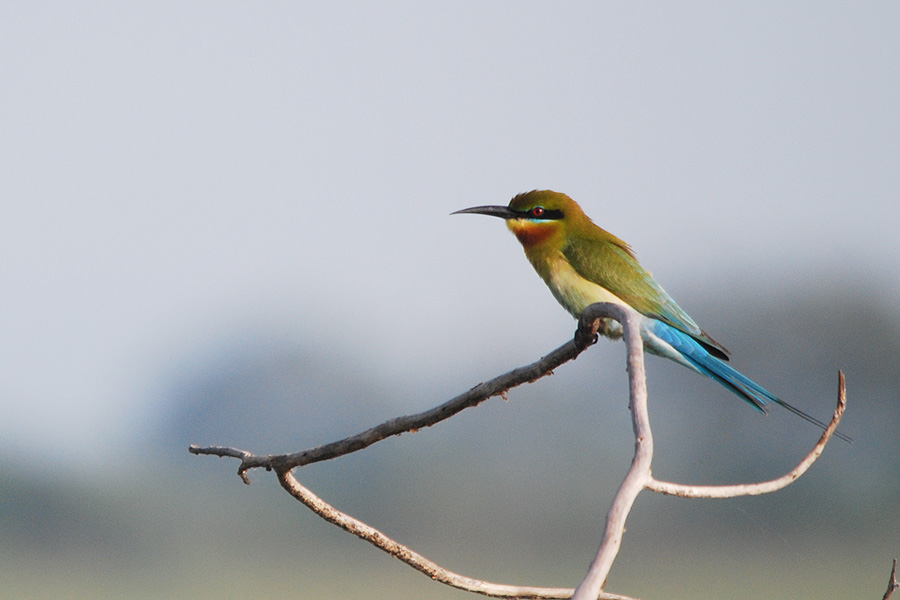
Blue tailed bee-eater at Chembarambakkam lake

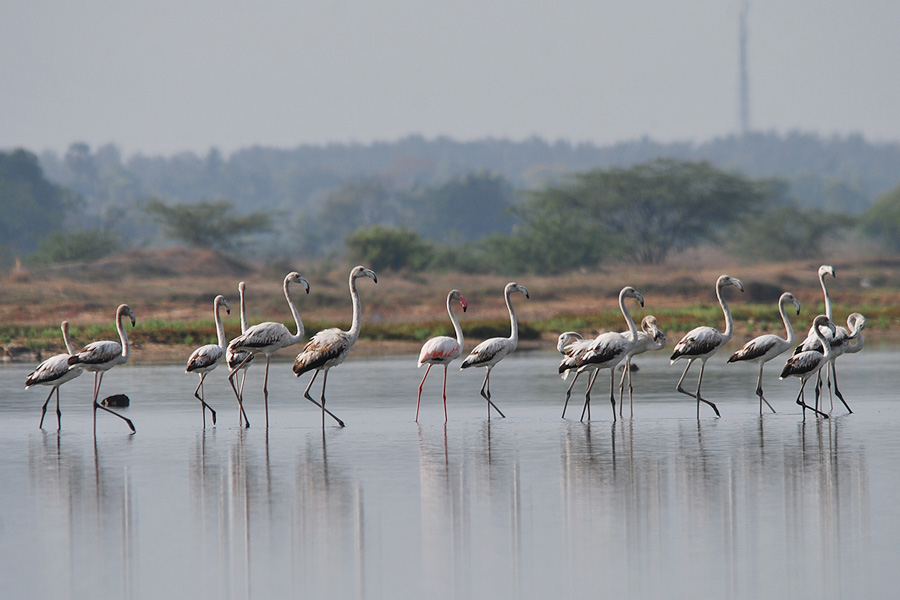
Greater flamingo juveniles at Kelambakkam backwaters

Chembarabakkam lake is another rain-water fed freshwater lake covering an area of 15 km^{2}. This place is famous for wintering ducks and other migratory water birds. At least 60+ resident and migrant bird species have been recorded so far.

The habitat consists of a fresh water lake system, sparse scrub, reed beds, open dry land and floating vegetation.

Highlight: Hundreds of Eurasian wigeon, fulvous whistling duck, peregrine falcon, and cotton teal are recorded during winter. Red-necked falcons and golden jackals are recorded breeding in the open dry patches around the lake.

Resident bird species include pond heron, little cormorant, purple heron, spot-billed pelican, ashy woodswallow, little grebe, little green bee-eater, white-eyed buzzard, spotted owlet, Oriental darter, little egret, great egret, common coot, purple moorhen, white-breasted waterhen, bay-backed shrike, pied bushchat, grey francolin, ashy-crowned sparrow-lark, paddyfield pipit, black drongo, plain prinia, ashy prinia, black bittern, shikra, red munia, tricoloured munia, Indian silverbill, pheasant-tailed jacana.

During the wintering months common kestrel, Montague's harrier, blue-tailed bee-eater, barn swallow, Eurasian wigeon, cotton pygmy goose, fulvous whistling duck, painted stork, openbill stork can be spotted.

How to reach Chembarambakkam lake: Google Maps

Perumbakkam Lake

Perumbakkam lake near Sholinganallur Signal (towards Medavakkam) is a location for birding. Pelicans, painted storks, ducks, and other species are present throughout the year. The location is situated within city limits.

== Kelambakkam backwaters ==
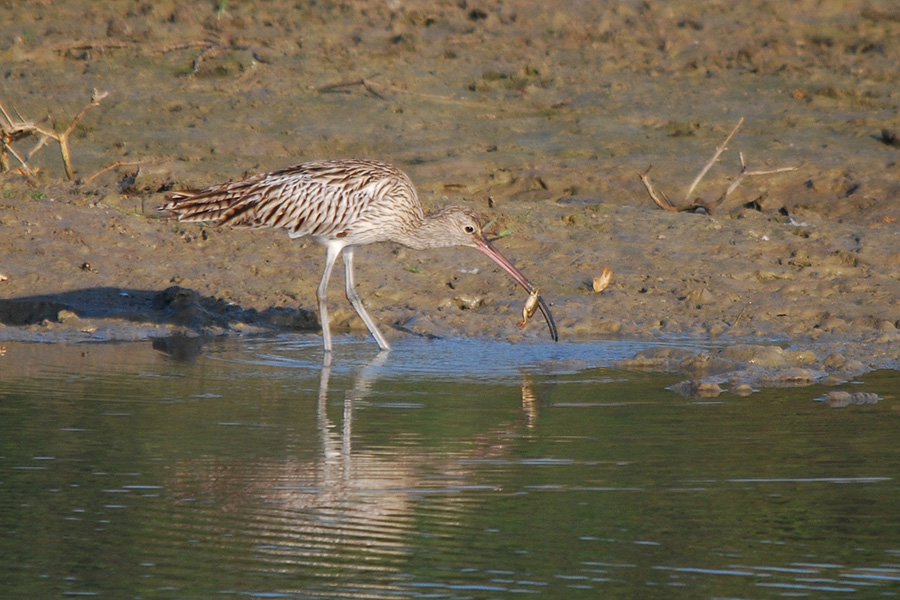
Eurasian curlew with crab at Kelambakkam backwaters

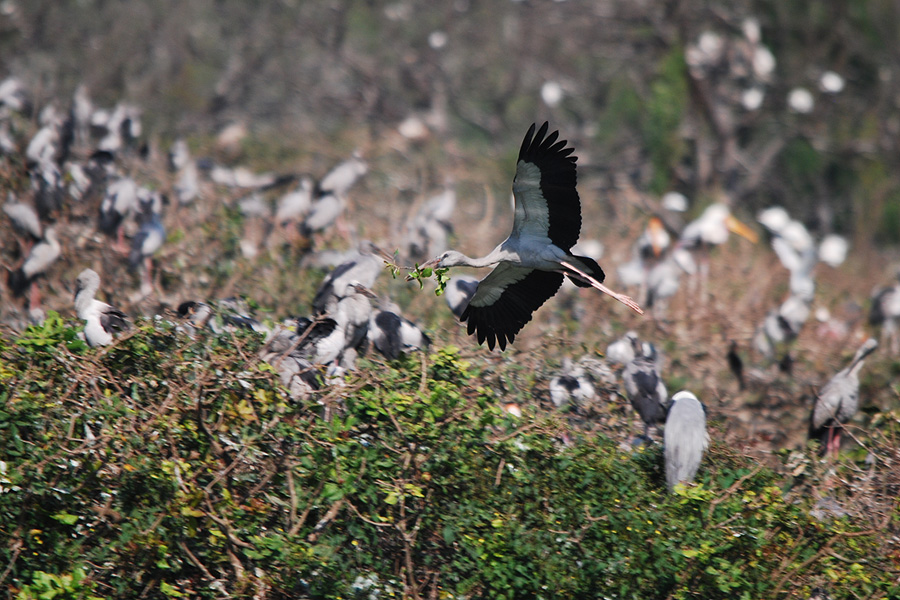
Asian openbill stork at Vedanthangal Bird Sanctuary

Kelambakkam backwaters is a brackish water lagoon adjacent to the Bay of Bengal in the East Coast Road. This place is a haven for waders, terns, gulls and other winter migrants. More than 80 species of bird have been recorded so far.

The habitat consists of coastal water mudflats, sand banks, salt pans and small scrubs.

Highlights: Thousands of gulls and terns are recorded during the winter months. Eurasian curlew, whimbrel, greater flamingo, great crested tern, Sandwich tern, white-winged black tern can be spotted during February and March. Black ibis were recorded for the first time in Chennai recently.

The resident birds seen here include little cormorant, spot-billed pelican, little grebe, common kingfisher, pied kingfisher, white-breasted kingfisher, little green or striated heron, little green bee-eater, black drongo, red-wattled lapwing, pond heron.

Thousands of waders can be seen here during winter. Some of the winter migrants seen here are common tern, little tern, whiskered tern, gull-billed tern, great crested tern, Sandwich tern, white-winged black tern, Caspian tern, brown headed/black headed/Pallas gulls, Kentish/lesser sand/Pacific golden/grey plovers, common sandpiper, wood sandpiper, curlew sandpiper, Terek sandpiper, Eurasian curlew, whimbrel, osprey, little stint, Temminck's stint, dunlin, black-tailed godwit, common redshank, greenshank, painted stork, openbill stork and grey heron.

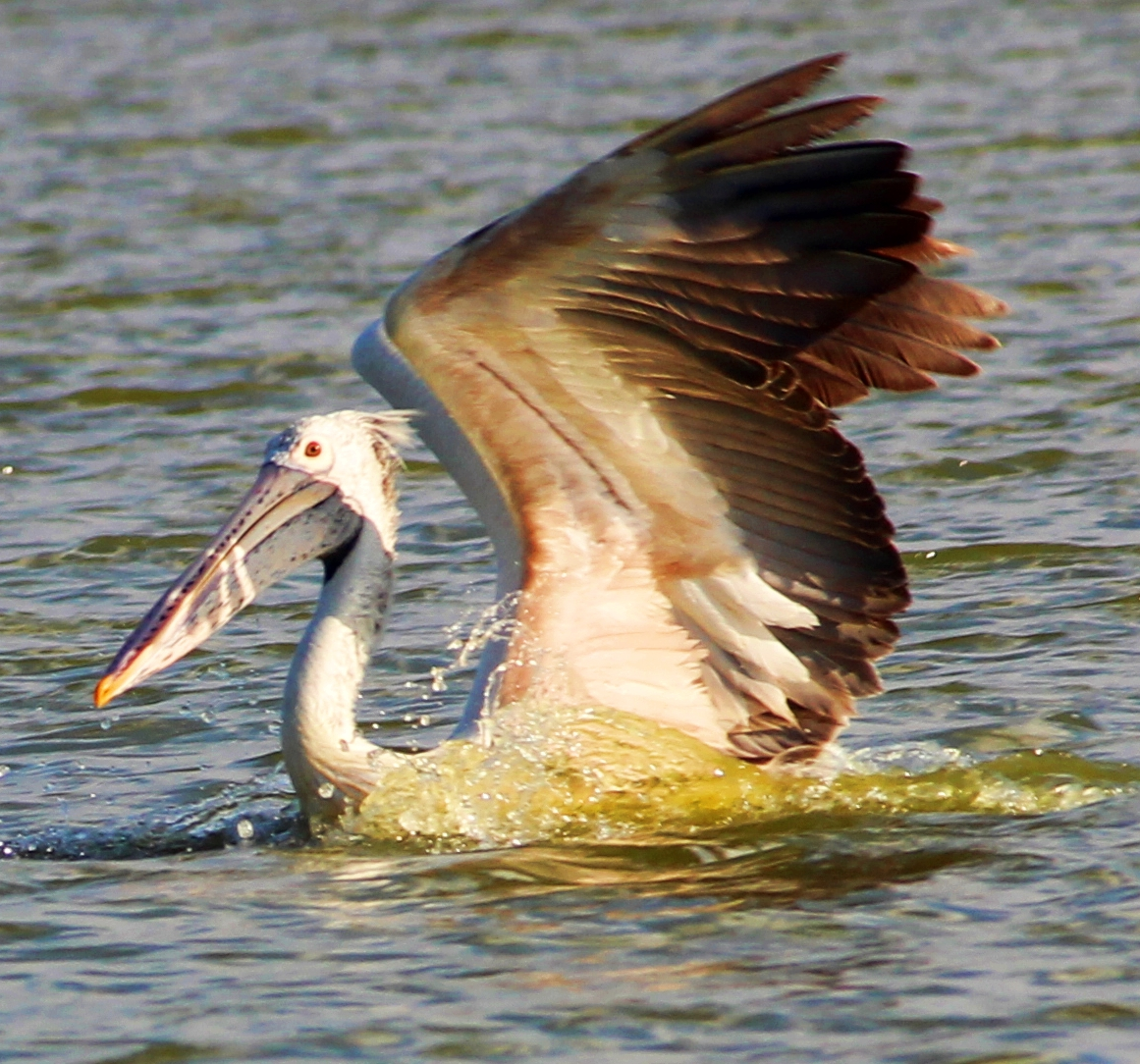
Kelambakkam Backwaters is one of the most important bird watching spots in Chennai. Lot of bird variety are found here throughout the year. Spot billed pelican seen as it is just about to land.

How to reach Kelambakkam backwaters: Google Maps

== Vedanthangal Bird Sanctuary ==
Vedanthangal Bird Sanctuary is one of the oldest bird sanctuaries in India. Covering 30 hectares, this lake is a nesting colony for thousands of winter migrants. The lake has trees like Barringtonia and Acacia species where the nests are built and young are raised.

Highlights: Heronry and wintering ducks.

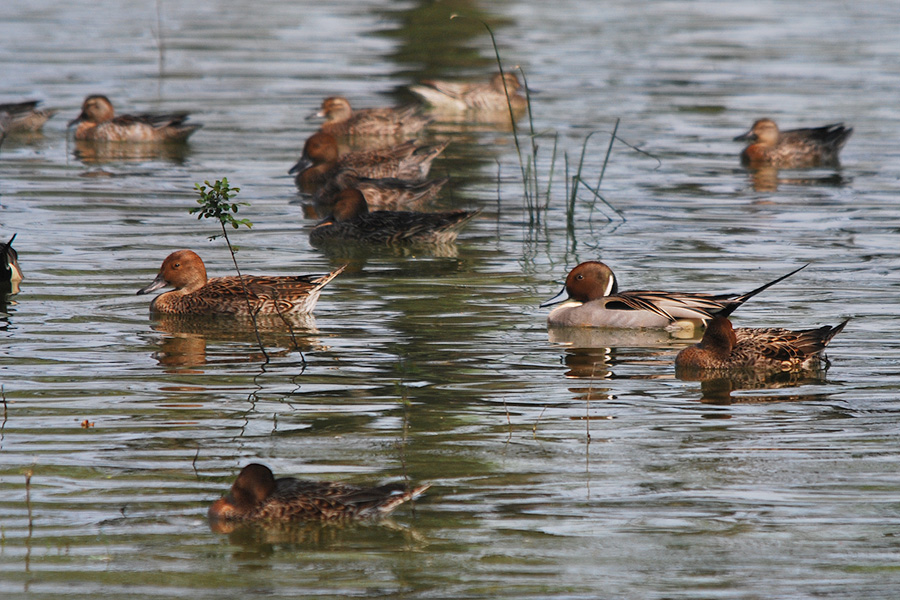
Northern pintails at Vedanthangal Bird Sanctuary

The bird species that nest here include painted stork, grey heron, Eurasian spoonbill, darter (snakebird), little cormorant, spot-billed pelican, black-headed ibis, glossy ibis, little egret, intermediate egret and great egret, black-crowned night heron, pond heron and Asian openbill stork. Hundreds of garganey teals, northern pintail and northern shoveller can also be seen in the lake. The best time to visit Vedanthangal Bird Sanctuary is from November to March.

How to reach Vedanthangal Bird Sanctuary: Google Maps

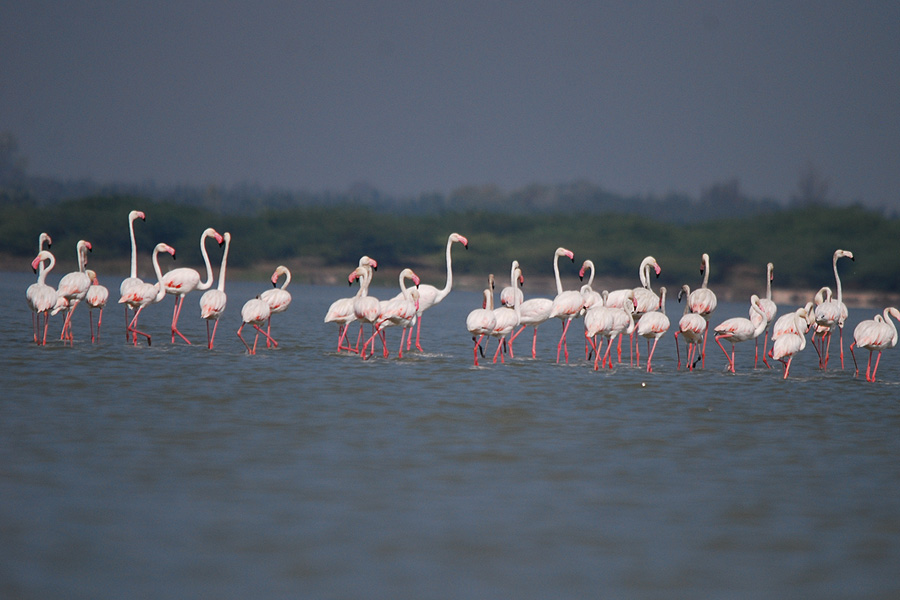
Greater flamingos at Mudaliarkuppam

== Mudaliarkuppam backwaters ==
Mudaliarkuppam backwaters is a brackish water lagoon adjacent to the Bay of Bengal on the East Coast Road. This is yet another haven for wading birds and migratory ducks.

The habitat consists of coastal water mudflats, sand banks and salt pans.

Highlights: Hundreds of greater flamingos can be spotted here throughout the year. Thousands of migratory ducks, terns and waders can also be spotted during winter months.

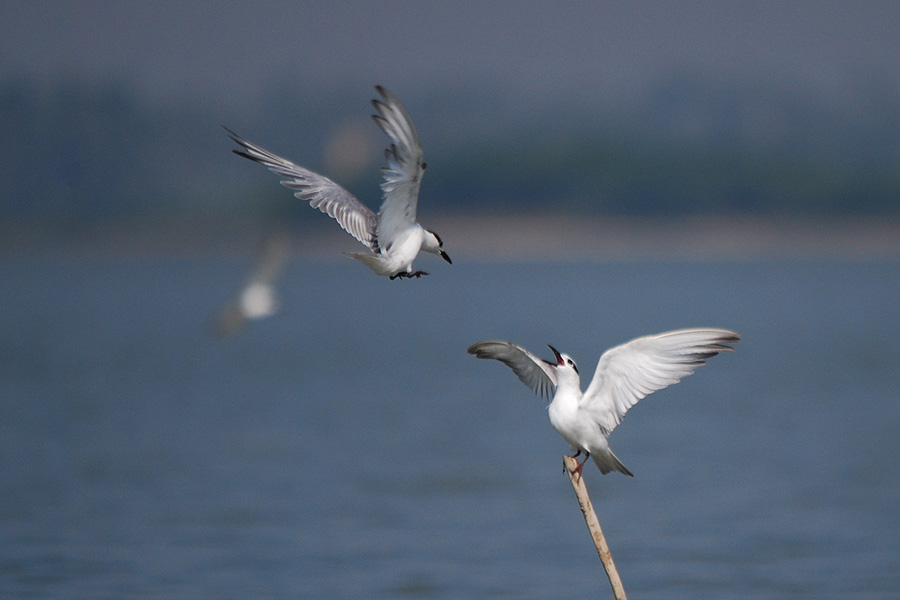
Gull billed terns at Mudaliarkuppam

The resident birds seen here include little cormorant, spot-billed pelican, little grebe, common kingfisher, pied kingfisher, white-breasted kingfisher, little green or striated heron, pond heron and red-wattled lapwing.

Some of the winter migrants seen here are greater flamingo, Kentish plover, lesser sand plover, Pacific golden plover, grey plover, common sandpiper, curlew sandpiper, Eurasian curlew, osprey, little stint, Temminck's stint, black-tailed godwit, common redshank, greenshank, common tern, little tern, whiskered tern, gull-billed tern, Caspian tern, brown-headed gull, Pallas's gull, slender-billed gull, painted stork, openbill stork and grey heron. Thousands of Eurasian wigeon, northern pintail, northern shoveller also use the backwaters.

How to reach Mudaliarkuppam backwaters: Google Maps

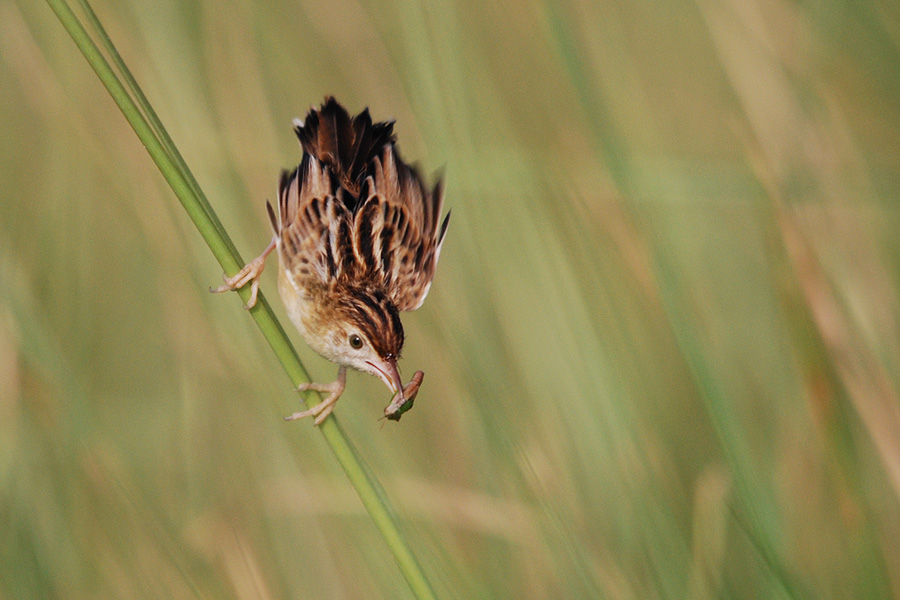
Zitting cisticola at Vedanthangal scrub

== Vedanthangal scrub and reed bed ==
Vedanthangal scrub and reed bed are among the lesser explored birding areas where some uncommon bird species can be spotted. Over 40 species can be seen in this very small area en route to the Vedanthangal bird sanctuary.

This is one of the best mixed habitats in Chennai, comprising thin scrub land, small ponds, reedbeds and grassland interspersed with paddy fields.

Highlights: Elusive bird species like slaty-breasted rail and ruddy-breasted crake can be spotted here. For the first time in Chennai, a rufous-rumped grassbird was recorded here.

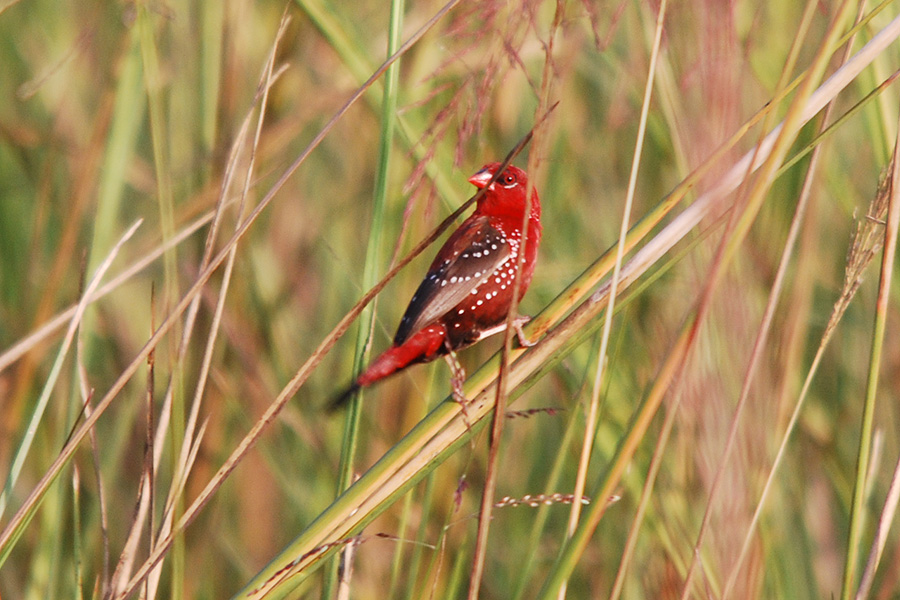
Red munia at Vedanthangal Scrub

Some of the resident bird species that can be seen here are little green bee-eater, blue-tailed bee-eater, plain prinia, ashy prinia, zitting cisticola, greater coucal, pied cuckoo, common kingfisher, pied kingfisher, white-breasted kingfisher, white-breasted waterhen, ruddy-breasted crake, slaty-breasted rail, tricolored munia, Indian silverbill (white-throated munia), scaly-breasted munia, red munia, paddyfield pipit, yellow bittern, black bittern, purple-rumped sunbird, purple sunbird, clamorous reed-warbler, pied wagtail, Asian palm swift, pond heron, black-shouldered kite, spotted dove and laughing dove.

Wintering species like booted warbler, Blyth's reed warbler and common kestrel can also be seen.

How to reach Vedanthangal: Google Maps

== Adyar/Tholkappia Poonga ==
Adyar Poonga is an eco park on the banks of the Adyar estuary covering 1.45 square kilometres. Over 100 bird species and over 70 species of butterflies have been recorded in and around the park so far.

The habitat consists of small ponds, flower gardens, sand banks, small scrub and estuary.

Highlights: Heronry and waders during the winter months. Uncommon butterflies like painted lady and black rajah have also been spotted here.

Some of the resident bird species that can be seen here are little cormorant, black-crowned night heron, little grebe, sunbirds, common kingfisher, pied kingfisher, white-breasted kingfisher, black-capped kingfisher, lesser whistling teal, white-breasted waterhen, cinnamon bittern, black bittern and little green bee-eater.

The wintering species that visit the estuary are black-winged stilt, common sandpiper, wood sandpiper, black-tailed godwit, little ringed plover, lesser sand plover, Pacific golden plover, whiskered tern, gull-billed tern, little egret and great egret.

How to reach Adyar/Tholkappia Poonga: Google Maps

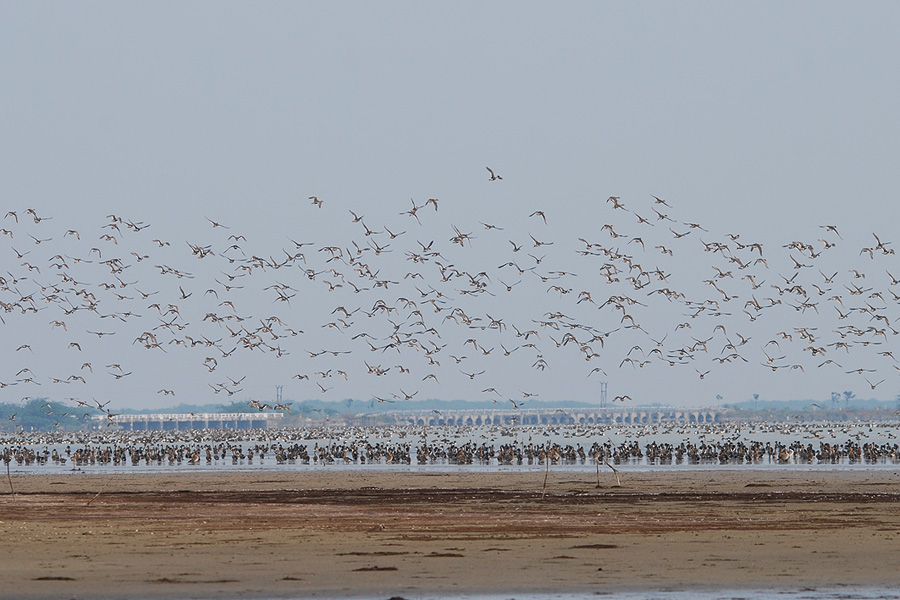
Northern pintails/shovellers at Pulicat lake

== Pulicat Lake/Shar Road and Annamalaichery Backwaters ==
Pulicat lake and Annamalaichery Backwaters are salt water lagoons/backwaters adjacent to the Bay of Bengal. Pulicat lake is known as the second largest salt water lake in India, covering an area of around 450 square kilometres. Over 130 resident and migratory bird species have been recorded so far.

The habitat consists of shallow brackish water lagoons, tidal mudflats, sand banks, thin scrub intercepted by paddy fields and reed beds.

Highlights: Thousands of greater flamingo, lesser flamingo, wintering ducks and waders have been recorded during the winter. White-bellied sea-eagle, osprey and booted eagle can also be seen.

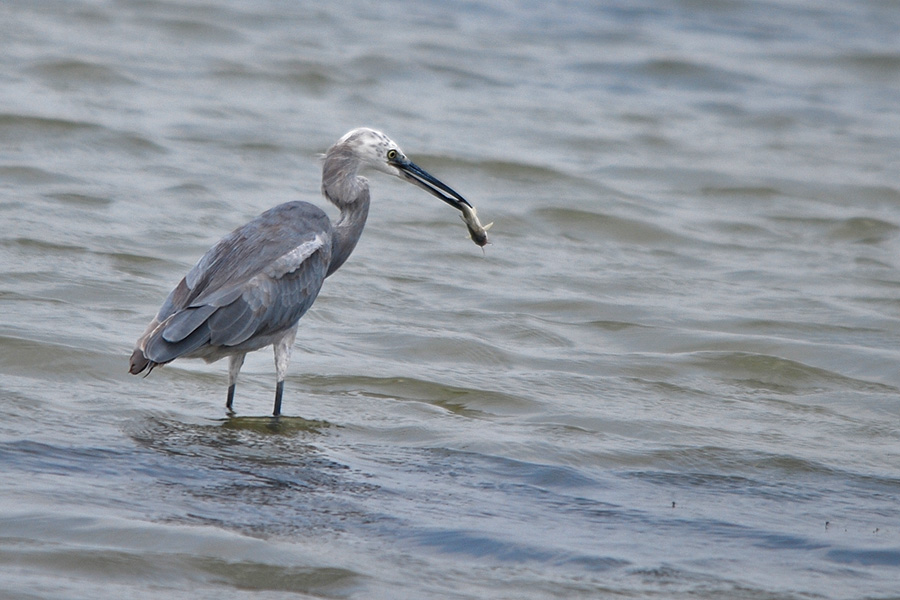
Western reef egret – intermediate morph at Pulicat

Some of the bird species spotted here in winter include greater flamingo, lesser flamingo, northern pintail, northern shoveller ducks, sandpipers, plovers, terns, gulls, osprey, painted stork, Asian openbill stork, glossy ibis, black-headed ibis, western reef egret, little egret, intermediate egret, great egret, greenshank, common redshank, spotted redshank, godwits, pied avocet, Eurasian curlew, spot-billed pelican, stints, peregrine falcon and common kestrel.

How to reach Pulicat Lake: Google Maps

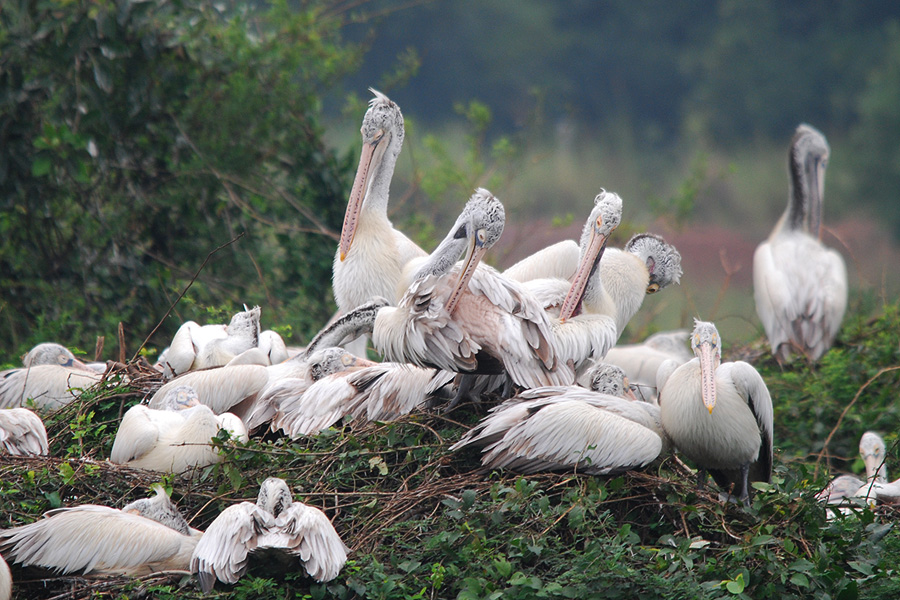
Spot billed pelican nesting at Nelapattu Bird Sanctuary

== Nelapattu Bird Sanctuary ==
Nelapattu Bird Sanctuary is one of the best breeding grounds for spot-billed pelican in the country. Covering an area of 4.5 square kilometres, this lake serves as a nesting colony for thousands of winter migrants. The lake has Barringtonia species trees where these wintering birds build their nests.

Highlights: Heronry and wintering ducks.

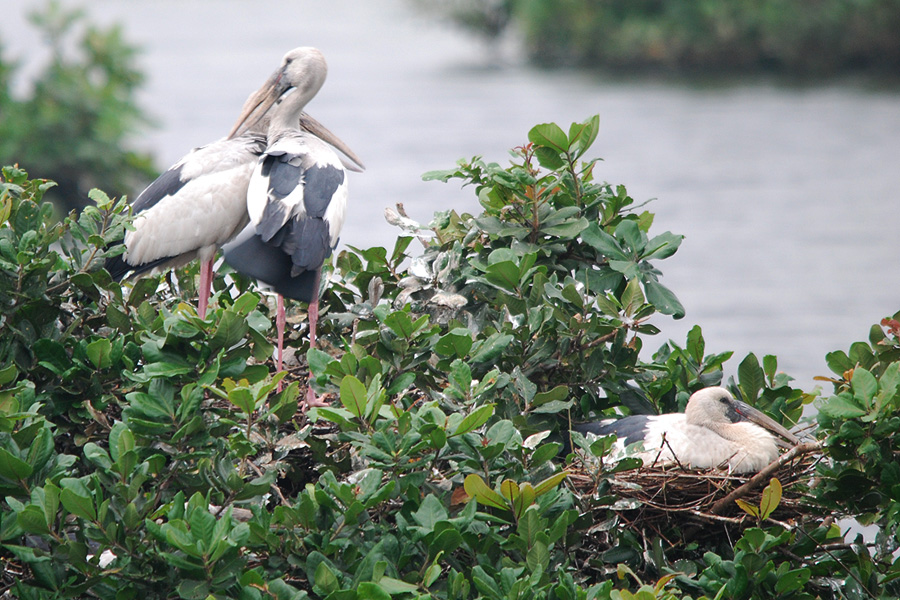
Asian openbill nesting at Nelapattu Bird Sanctuary

The bird species that nest here include painted stork, grey heron, Eurasian spoonbill, darter, little cormorant, Indian shag, spot-billed pelican, black-headed ibis, glossy ibis, little egret, intermediate egret, great egret, black-crowned night heron, pond heron and Asian openbill stork. Hundreds of garganey teal, northern pintail, gadwall and northern shoveller can also be seen on the lake. The best time to visit this place is from November to March.

How to reach Nelapattu Bird Sanctuary: Google Maps

== See also ==
- Wildlife sanctuaries of India
