= Sirudavoor Lake =

Lake in Tamil Nadu, India

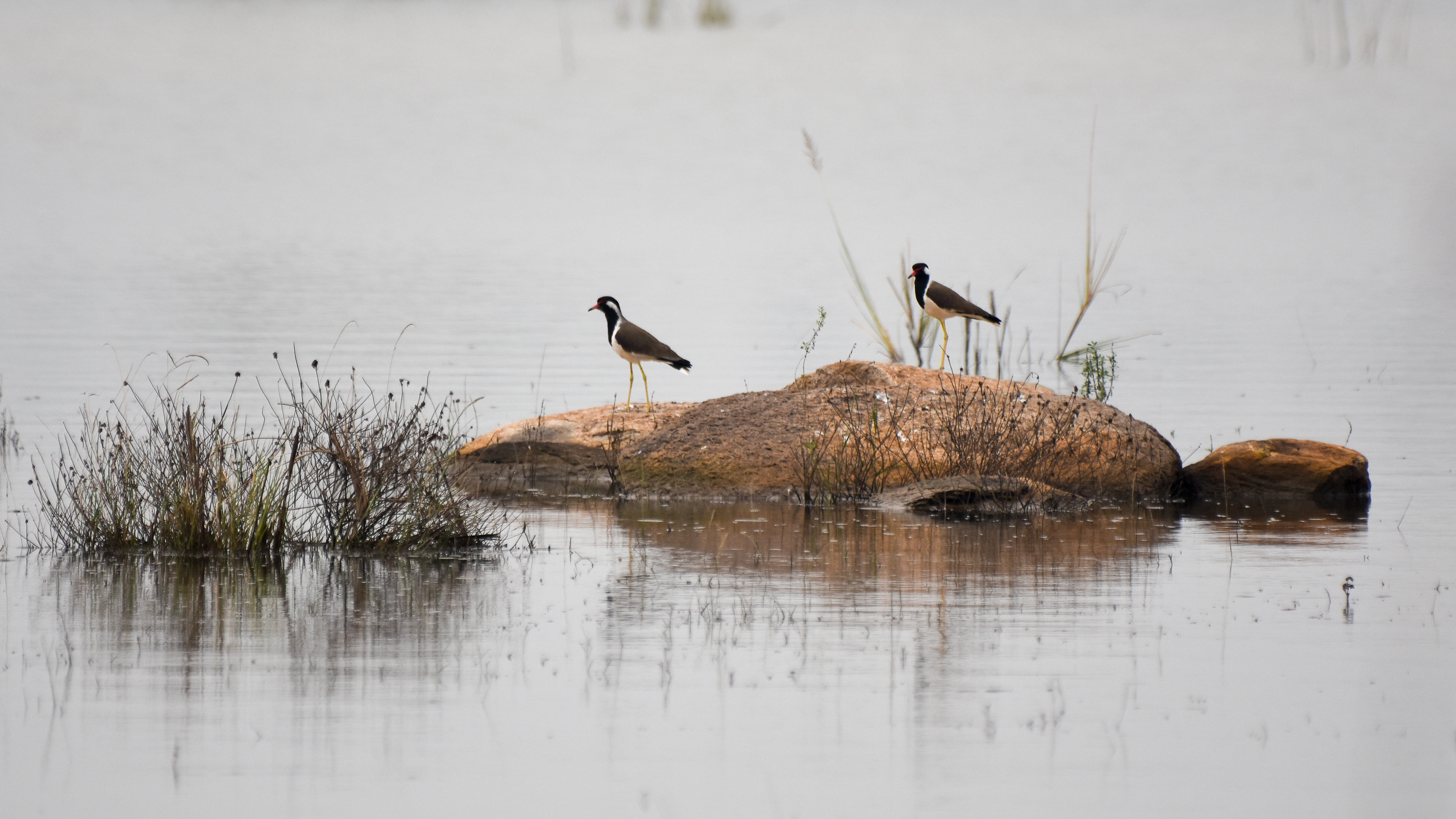
- Lapwings on rocks, Jan '21

- Location within Tamil Nadu
- Location: Kanchipuram district, Tamil Nadu
- Coordinates: 12.6832°N 80.1465°E
- Basin countries: India

Sirudavoor Lake (Note: The official spelling is Sirudavoor (சிறுதாவூர்). Other spellings used in newspapers and websites are Sirudavur and Siruthavur.) is an inland lake with wetlands in the Kanchipuram district of Tamil Nadu state, in eastern South India. This lake is on the Coromandel Coast, near the Bay of Bengal. It lies approximately 51 kilometres (32 mi) south of Chennai city. The lake is home to a number of bird species. During winter, several migratory species can be spotted.

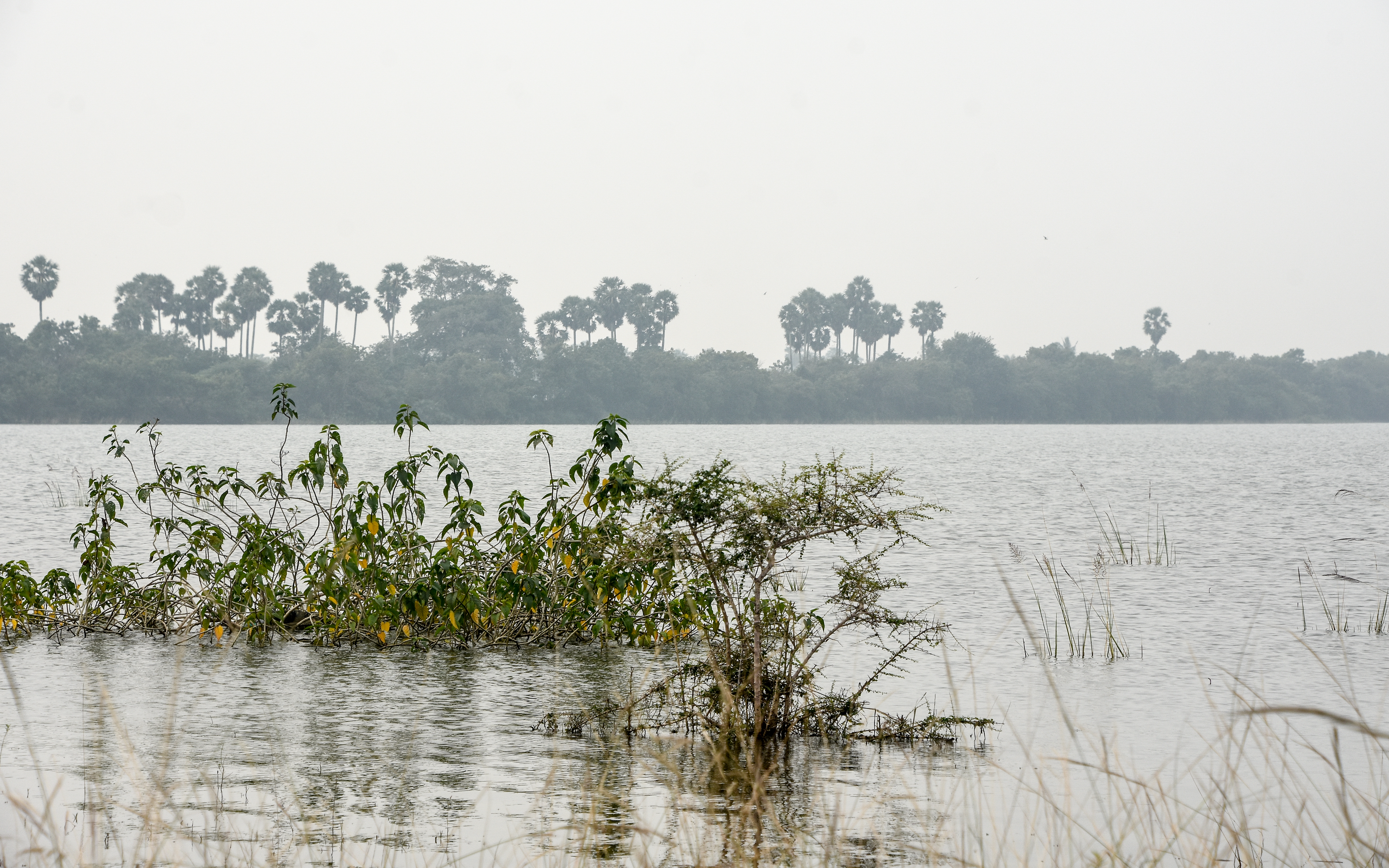
View from NW looking south, Jan '21

== Ecology ==
Sirudavoor Lake is a rain-fed fresh water lake used for irrigation and fishing. The habitat consists of a freshwater lake system, open grassland, sparse dry scrub and reed beds. It is known for fresh water ducks such as Eurasian wigeon and cotton pygmy goose. Over 110 resident and migratory bird species have been recorded so far, with 84 being counted in the Asian Waterbird Census in January 2020. Both red-wattled lapwing and yellow-wattled lapwing are seen in close proximity.

Some of the resident bird species include little green bee-eater, pied bushchat, ashy-crowned sparrow-lark, paddyfield pipit, yellow-wattled lapwing, red-wattled lapwing, Indian pond heron, egret, Indian courser, common kingfisher, pied kingfisher, white-breasted kingfisher, little ringed plover, red-rumped swallow, shikra, white-eyed buzzard, red-necked falcon, short-toed snake-eagle, baya weaver, zitting cisticola, plain prinia, ashy prinia and Indian roller.

During winter months blue-tailed bee-eater, common kestrel, yellow wagtail, barn swallow, glossy ibis, black-headed ibis, Eurasian spoonbill, painted stork, openbill stork, booted eagle, Oriental pratincole, common sandpiper, wood sandpiper and greenshank can be spotted.

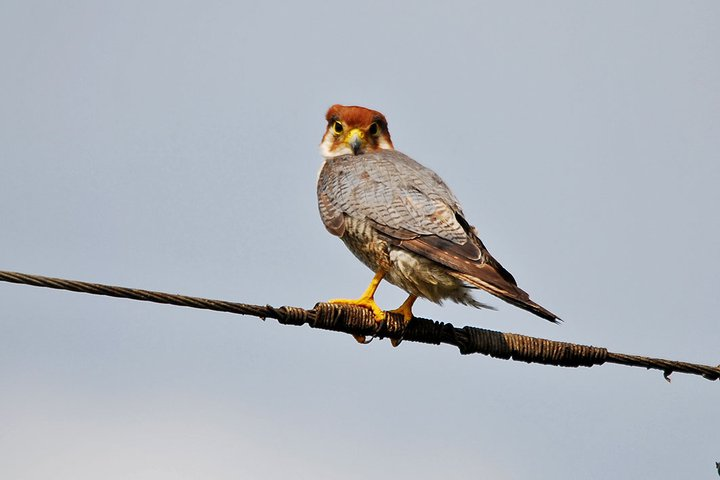
Red-necked falcon, Aug '11

Highlights: Indian courser are recorded to breed here. Uncommon raptors such as red-necked falcon and short-toed snake-eagle can also be spotted.

== Locality ==
The village of Sirudavoor is situated on the north-east boundary of the lake. In 2011, the village had a population of 2,309, with a female ratio of 983.7/1,000 males. It lies approximately 51 kilometres (32 mi) south of Chennai city.

== Gallery ==
=== Lake and Environs ===
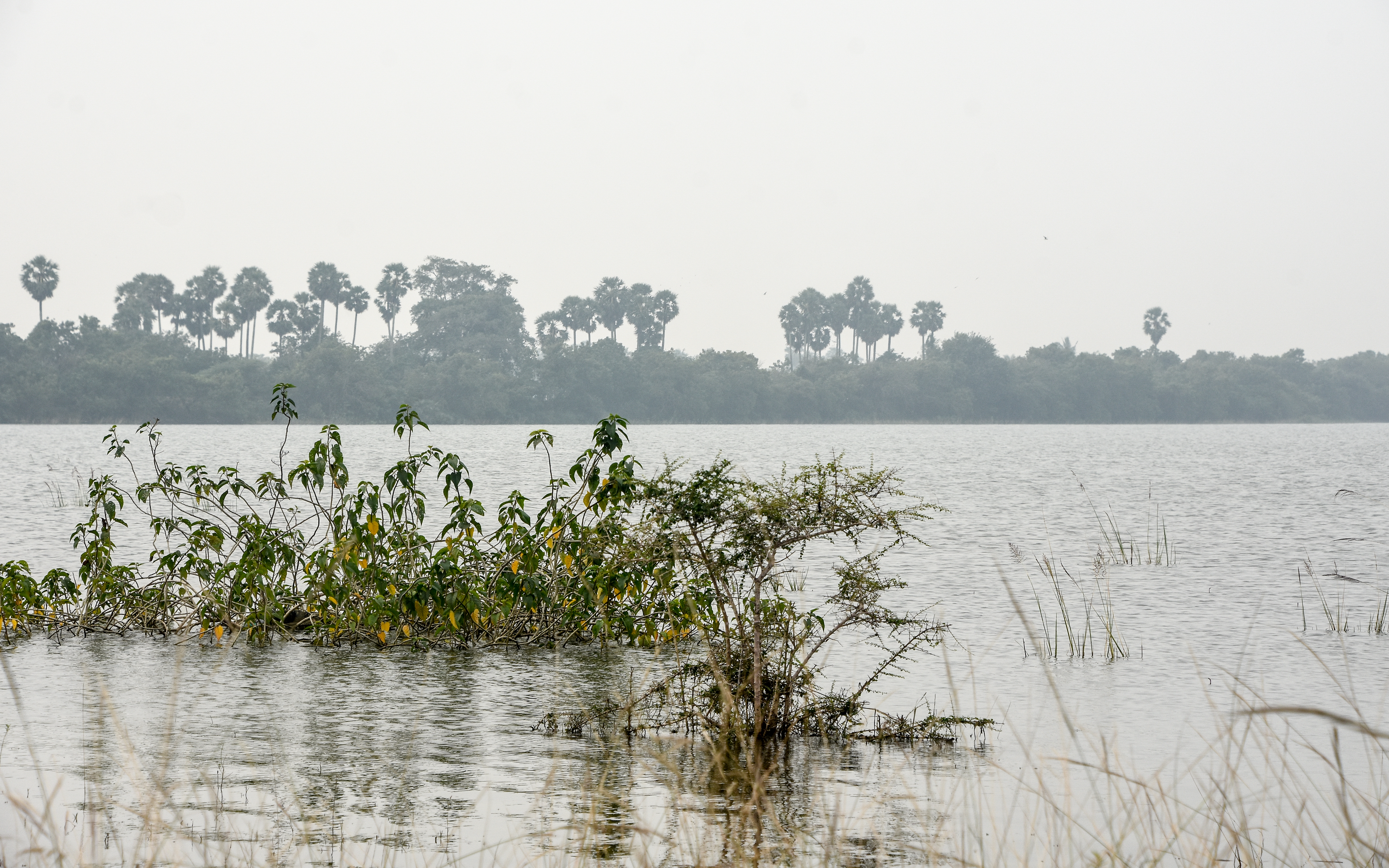
Looking south across the lake, Jan '21

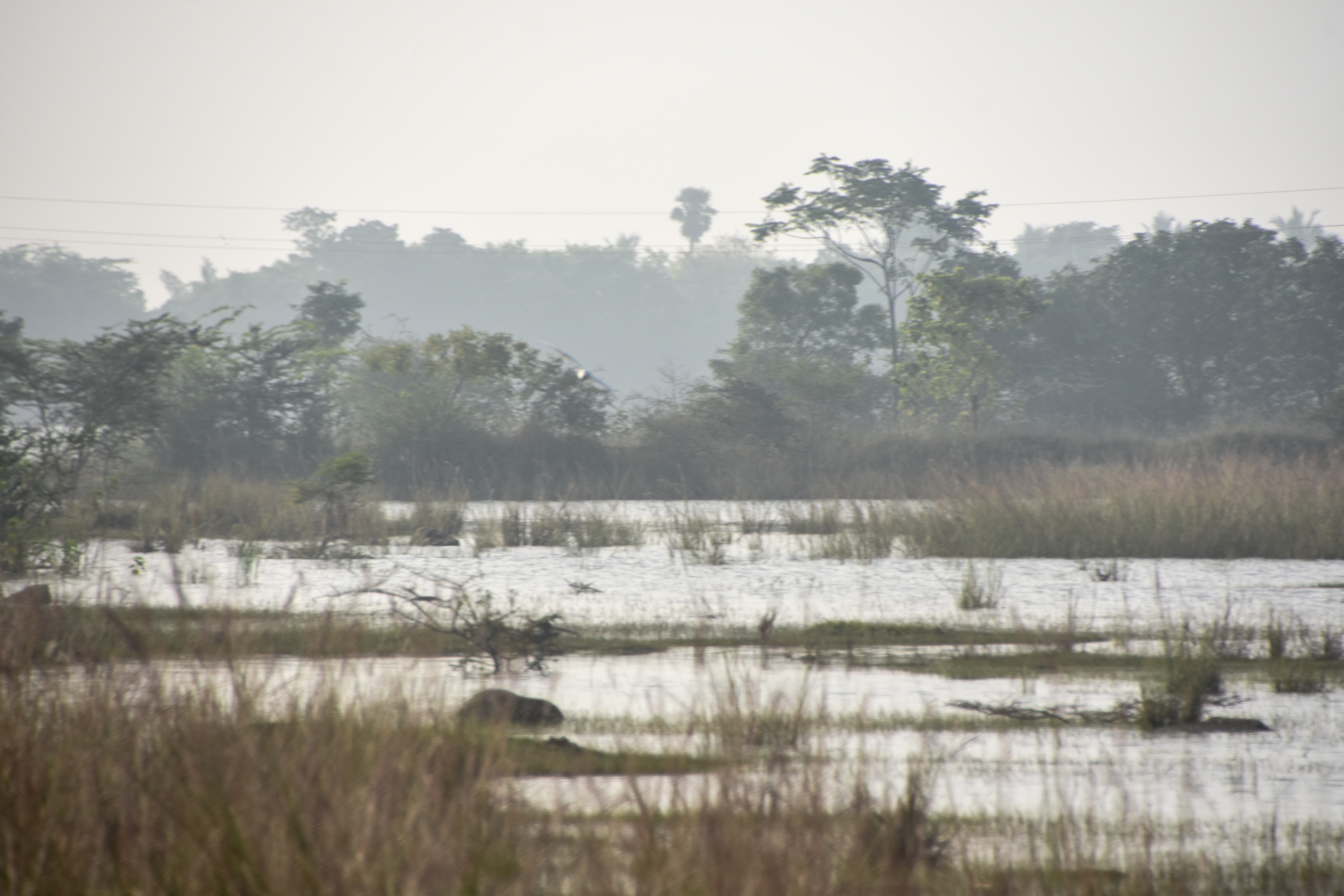
Marshy edges of Sirudavoor Lake, Jan '21

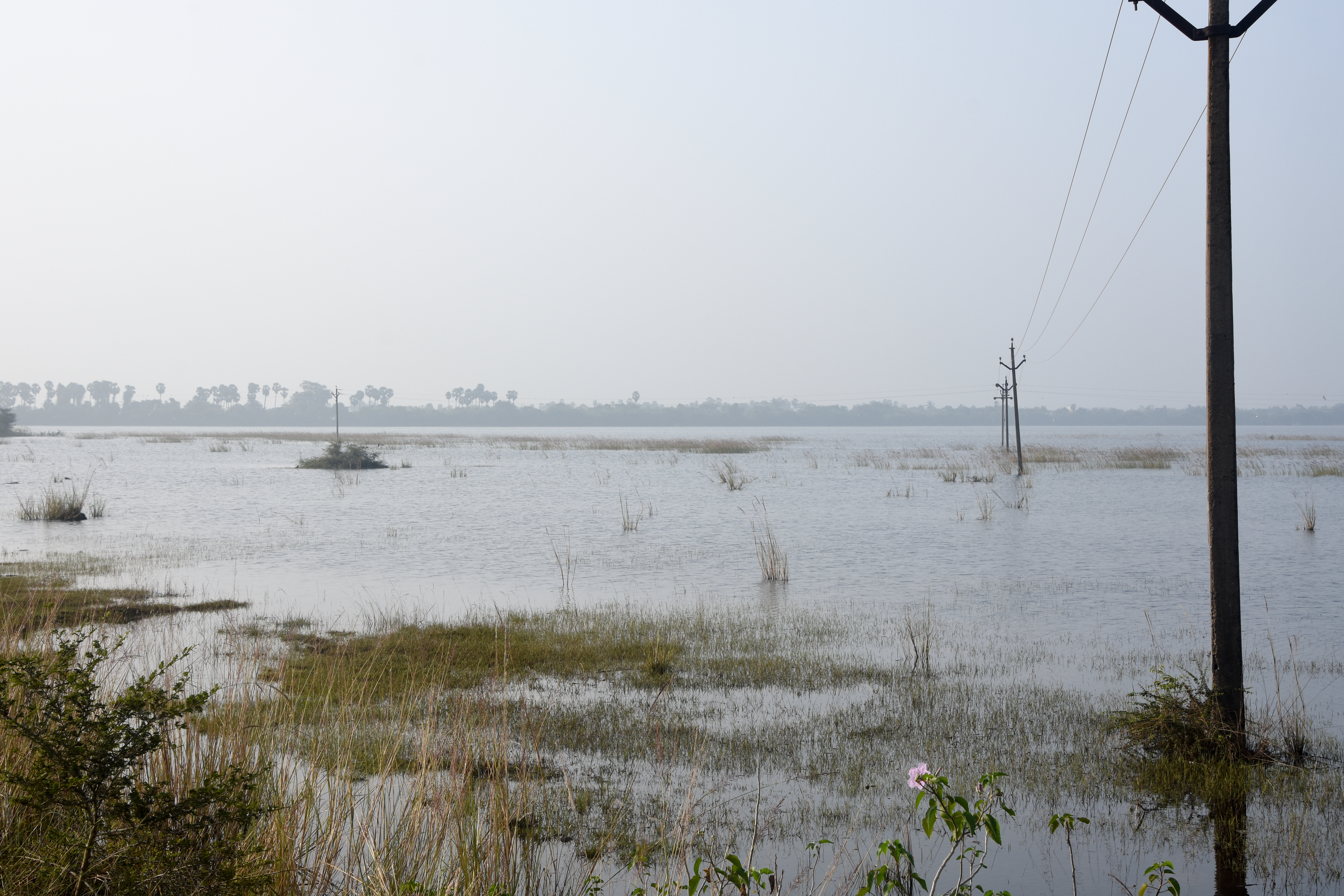
Electric lines crossing Sirudavoor Lake

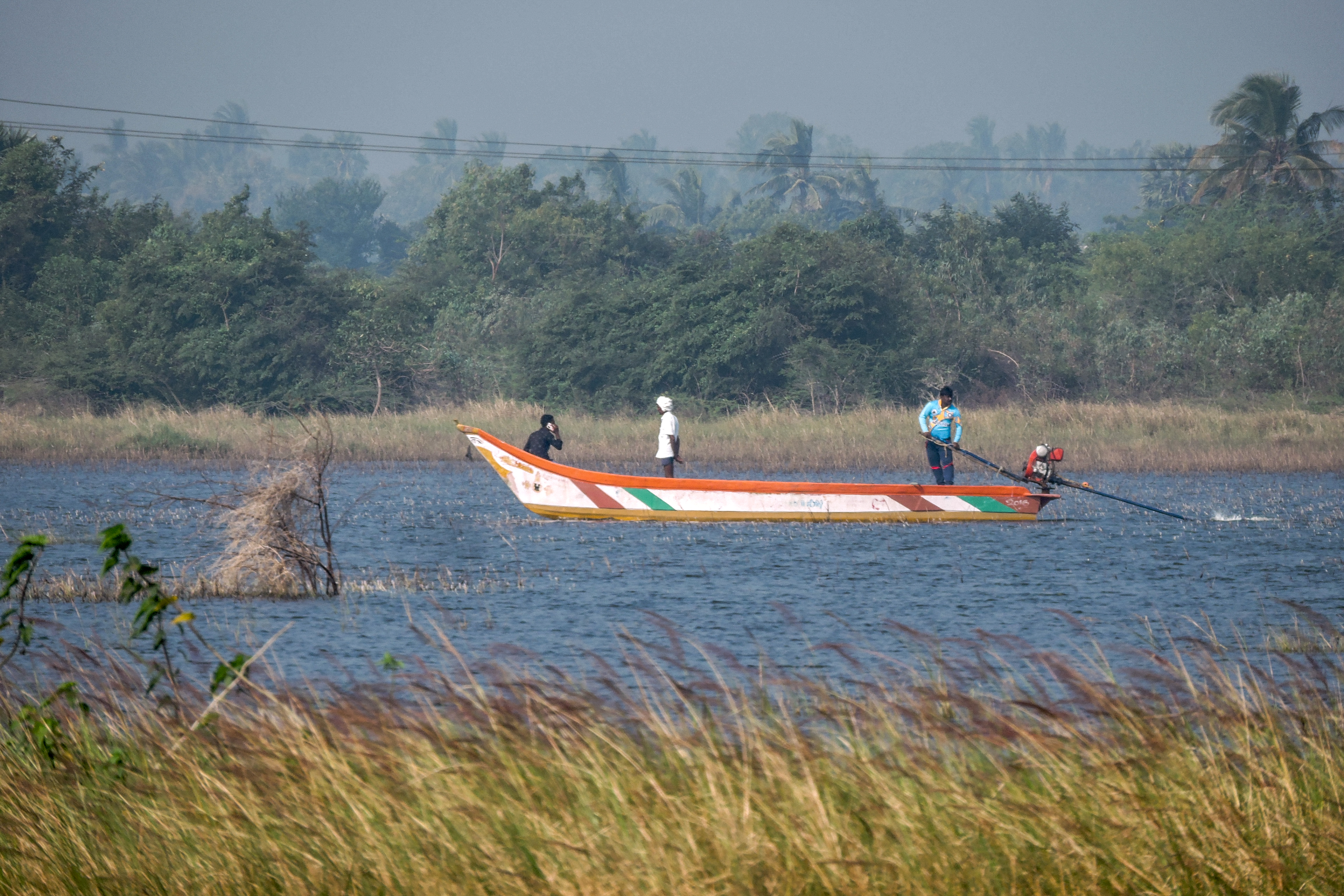
Fishing boat, Jan '21

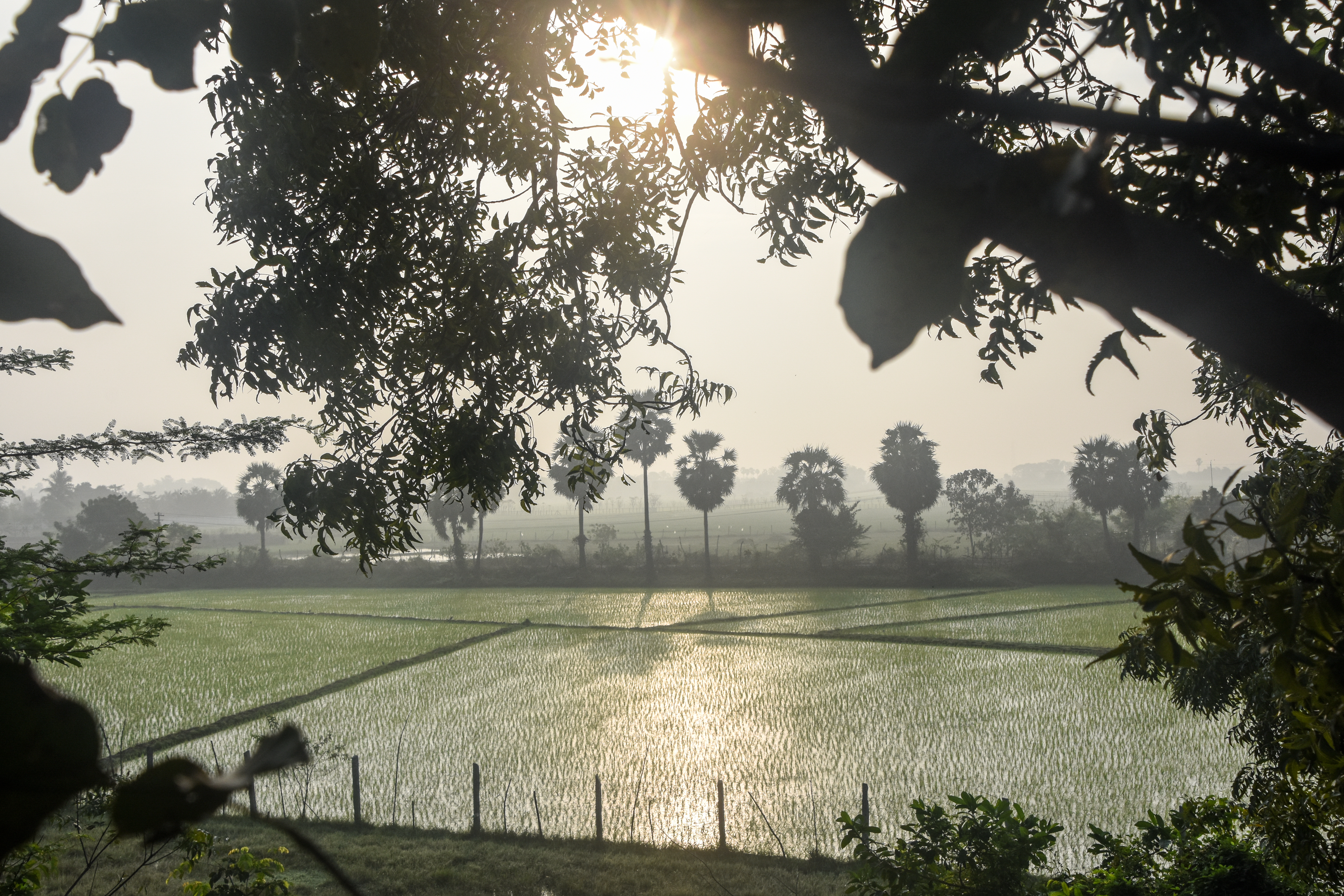
Paddy fields on SE of lake, Jan '21

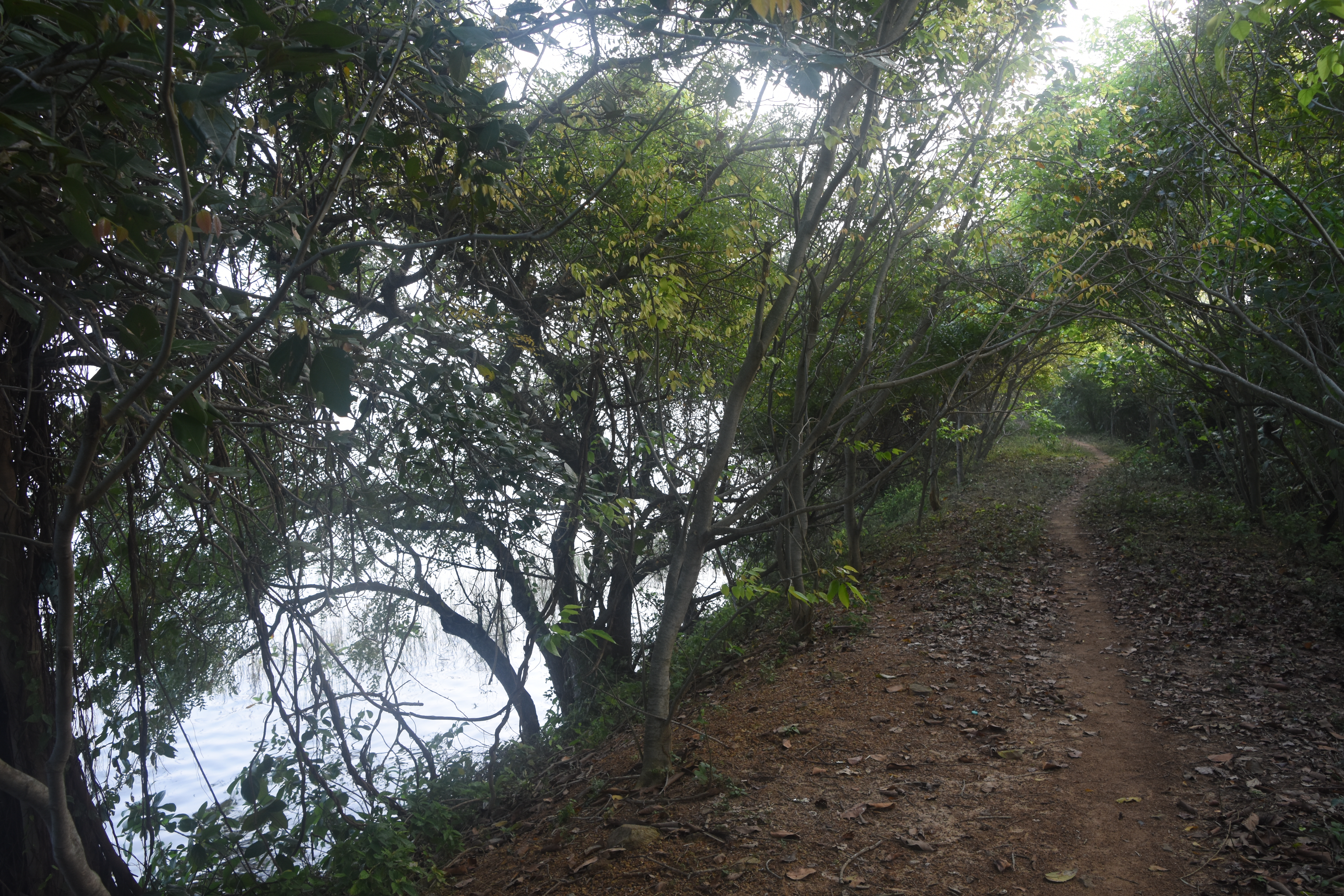
Foot path along SE of lake

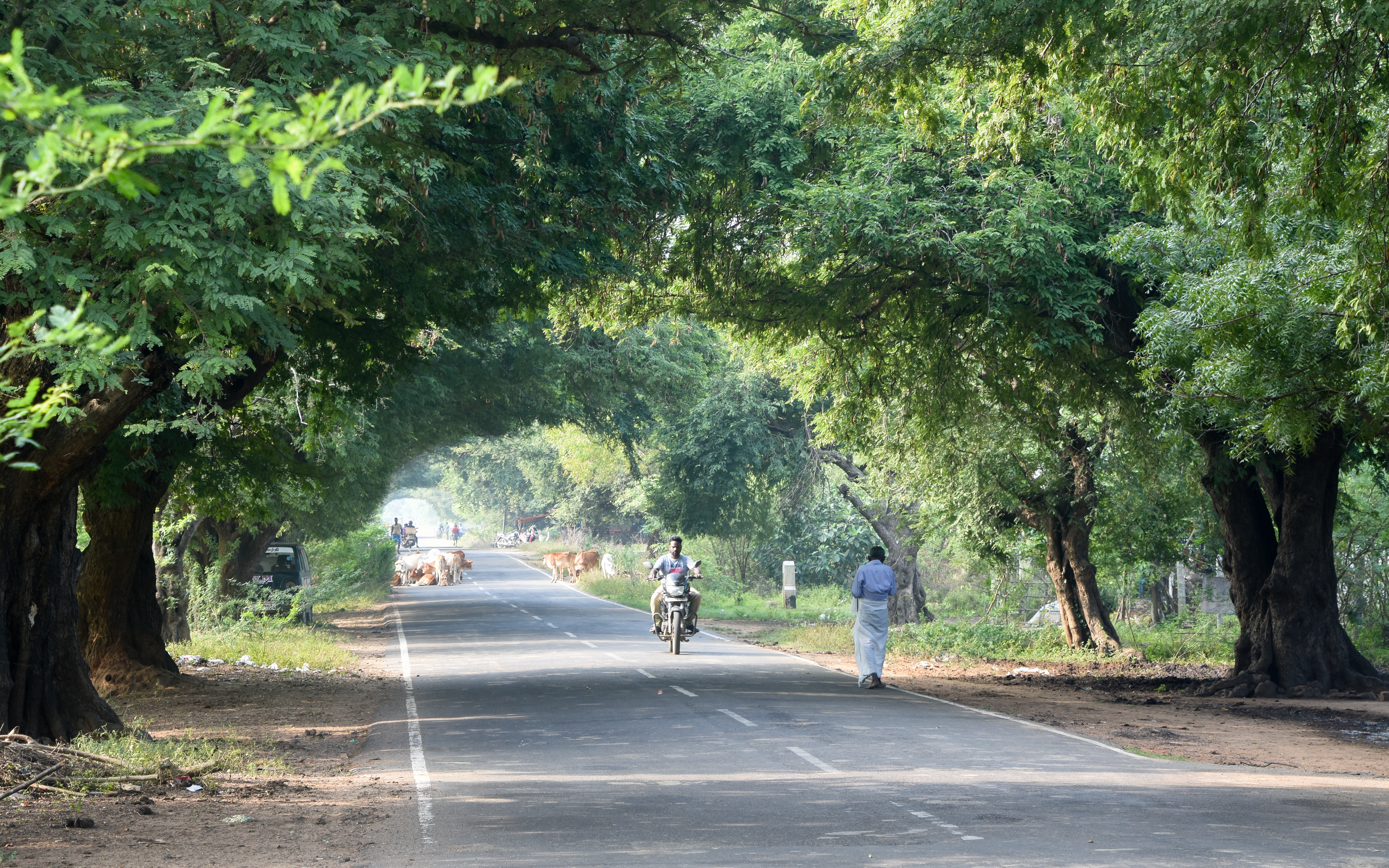
Highway towards Chennai, Jan '21

=== Resident Birds ===
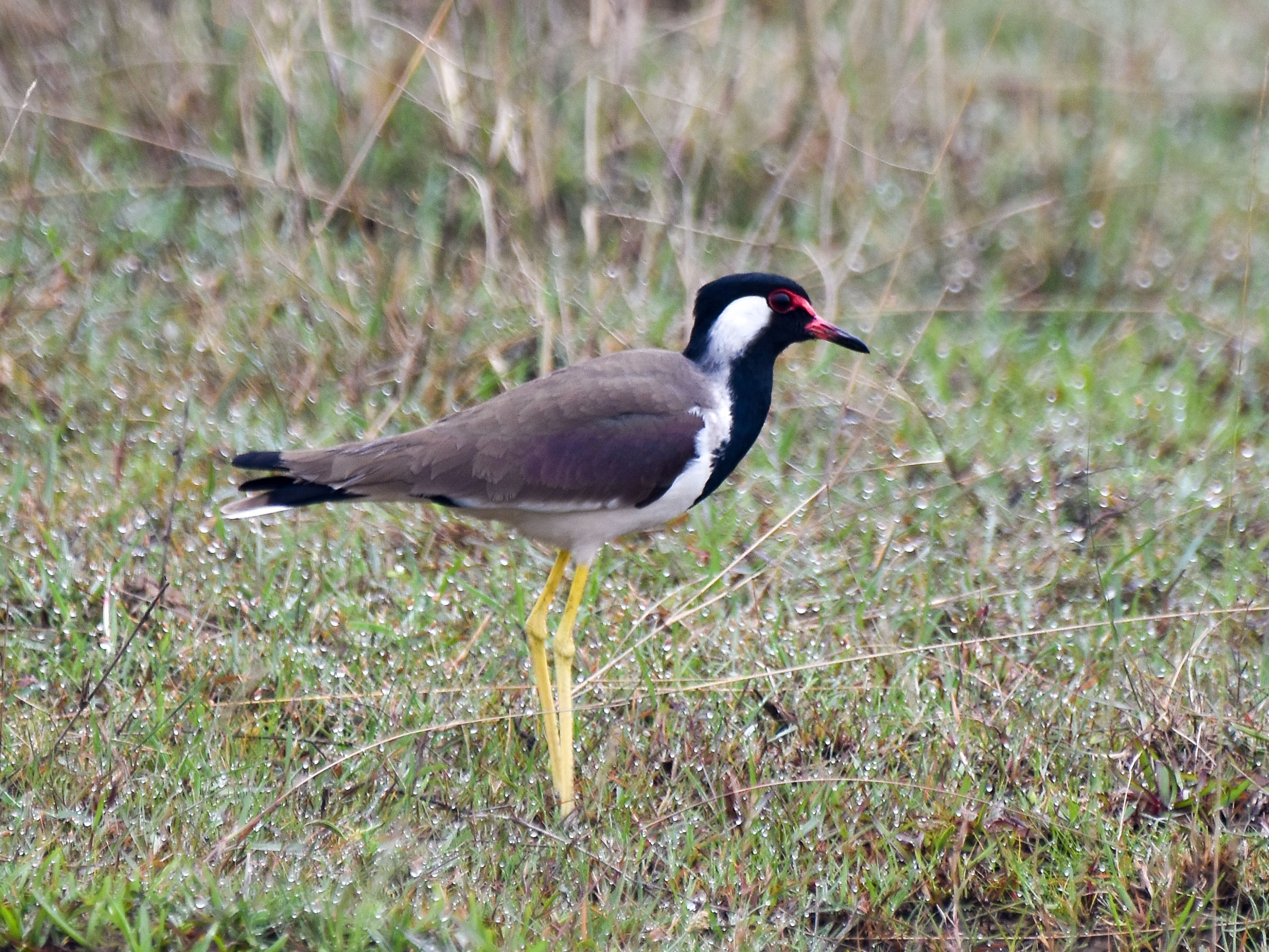
Red-wattled lapwing, Jan '21

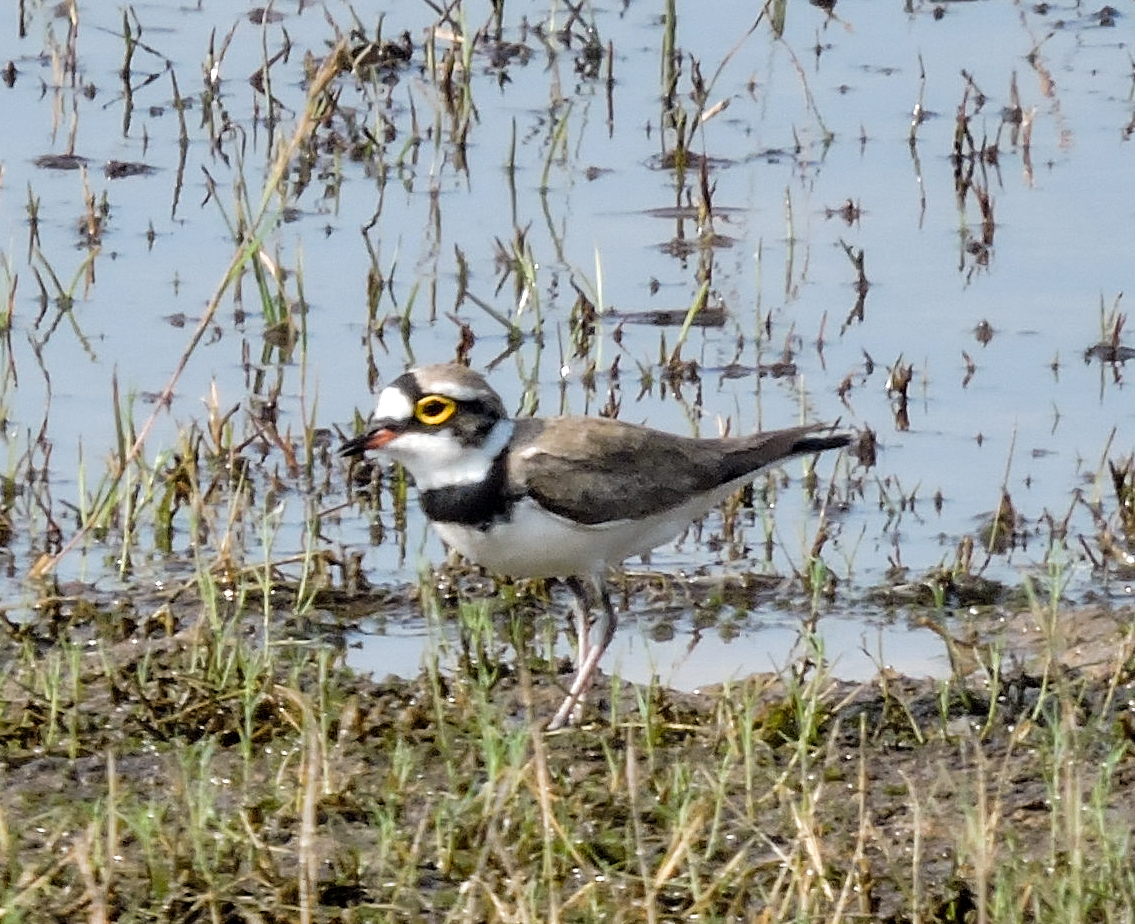
Little Ringed Plover, Dec '20

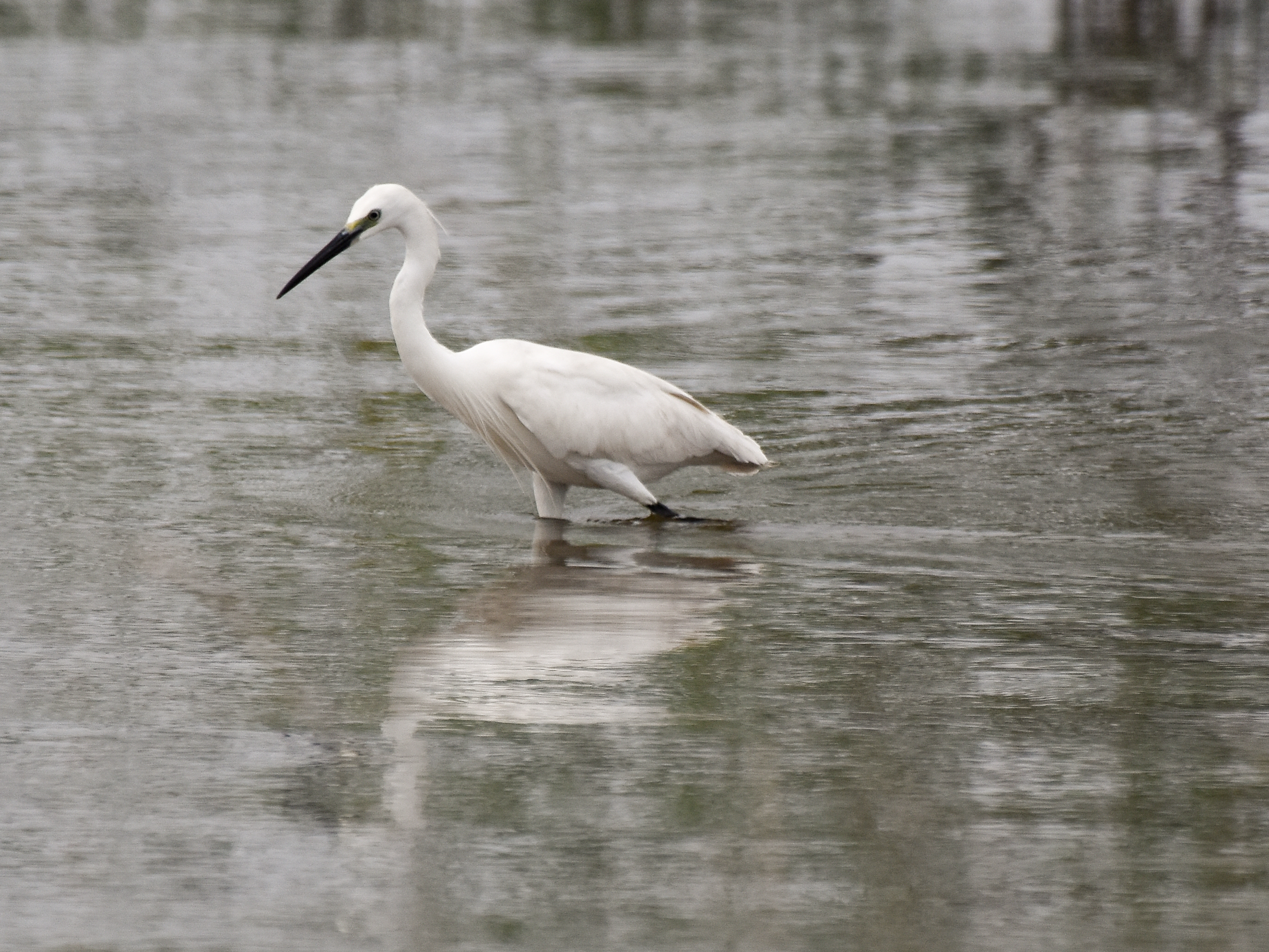
Egret, Jan '21

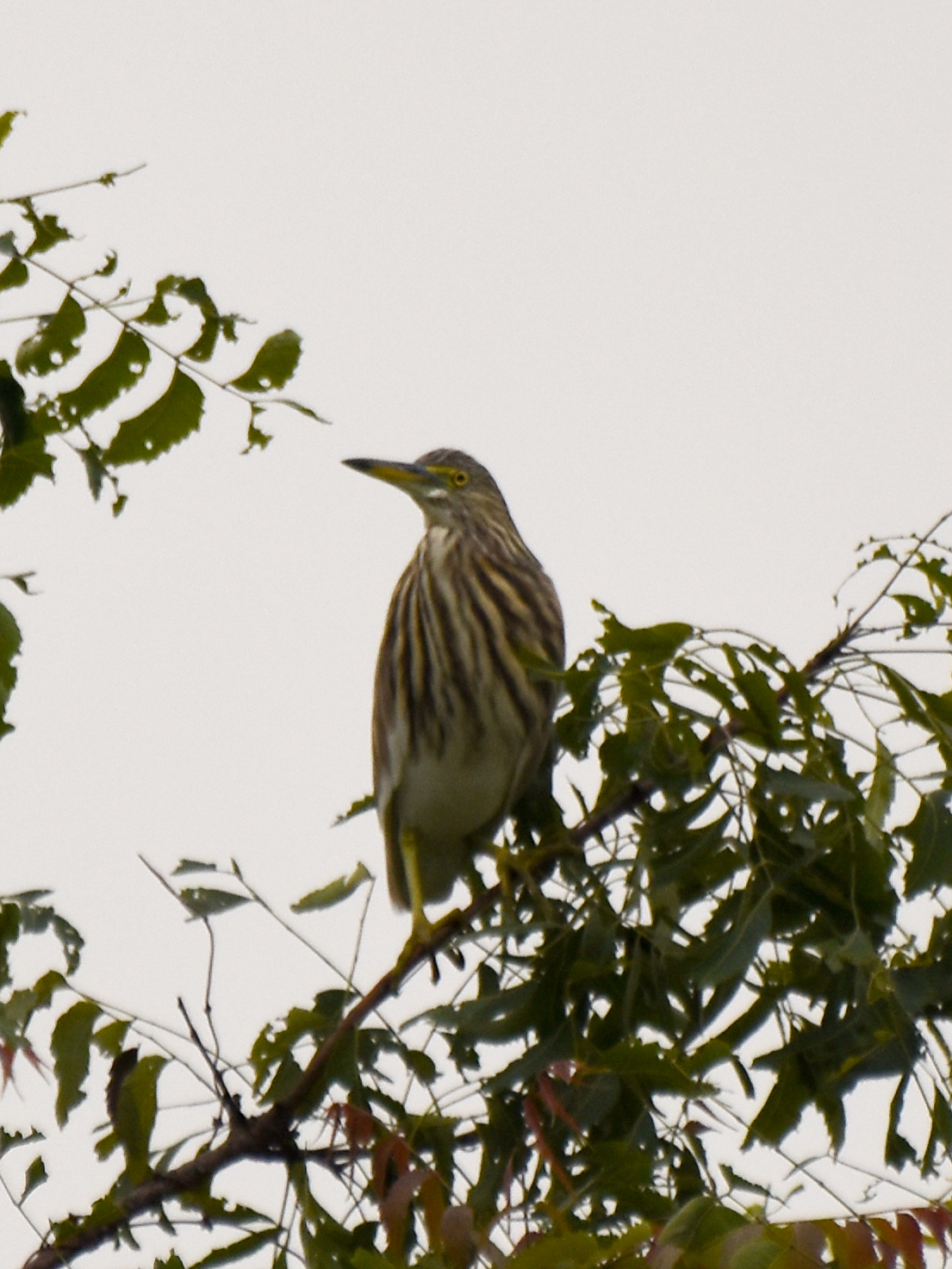
Indian pond heron, Jan '21

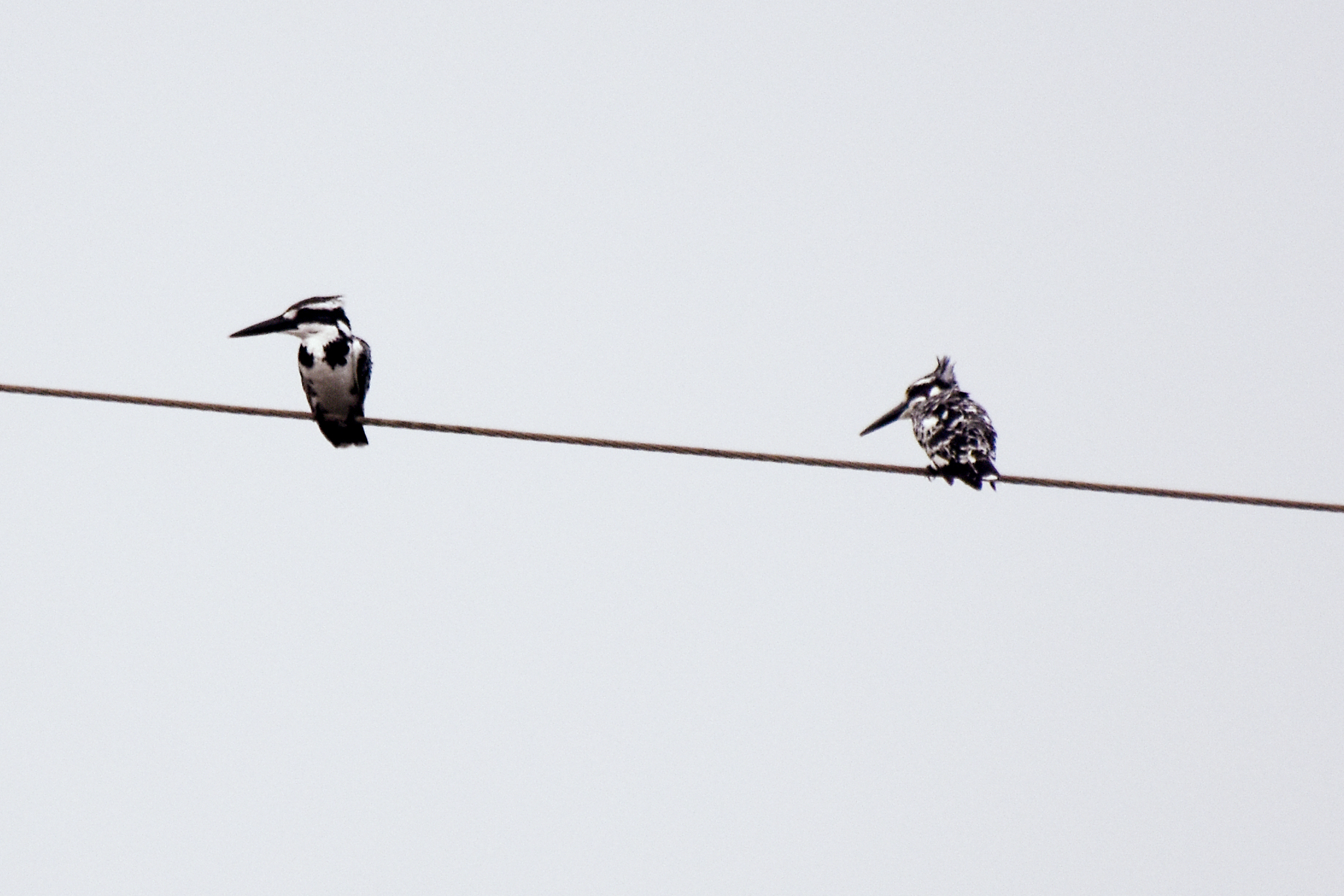
Pied kingfishers, Jan '21

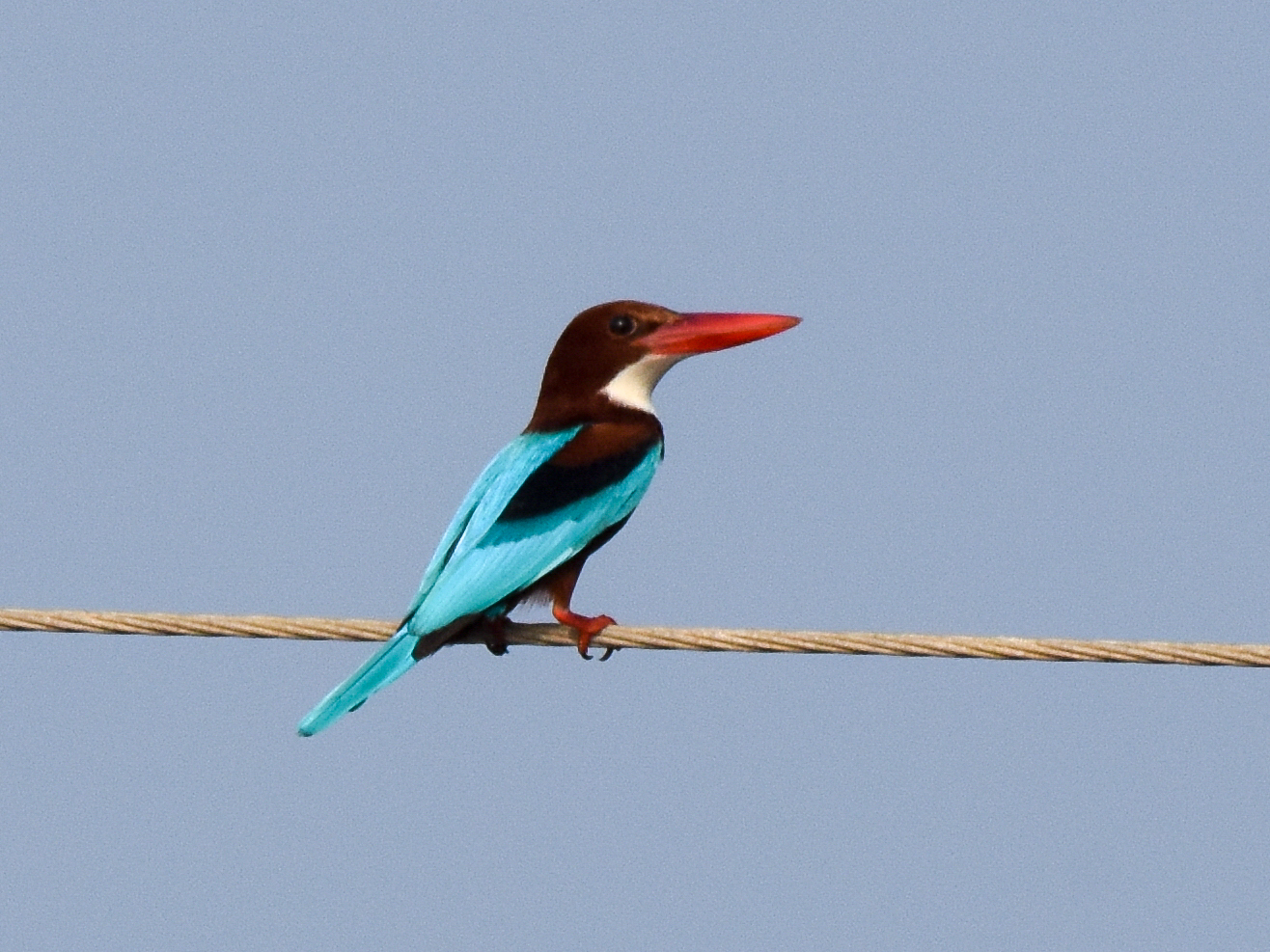
White-throated kingfisher, Jan '21

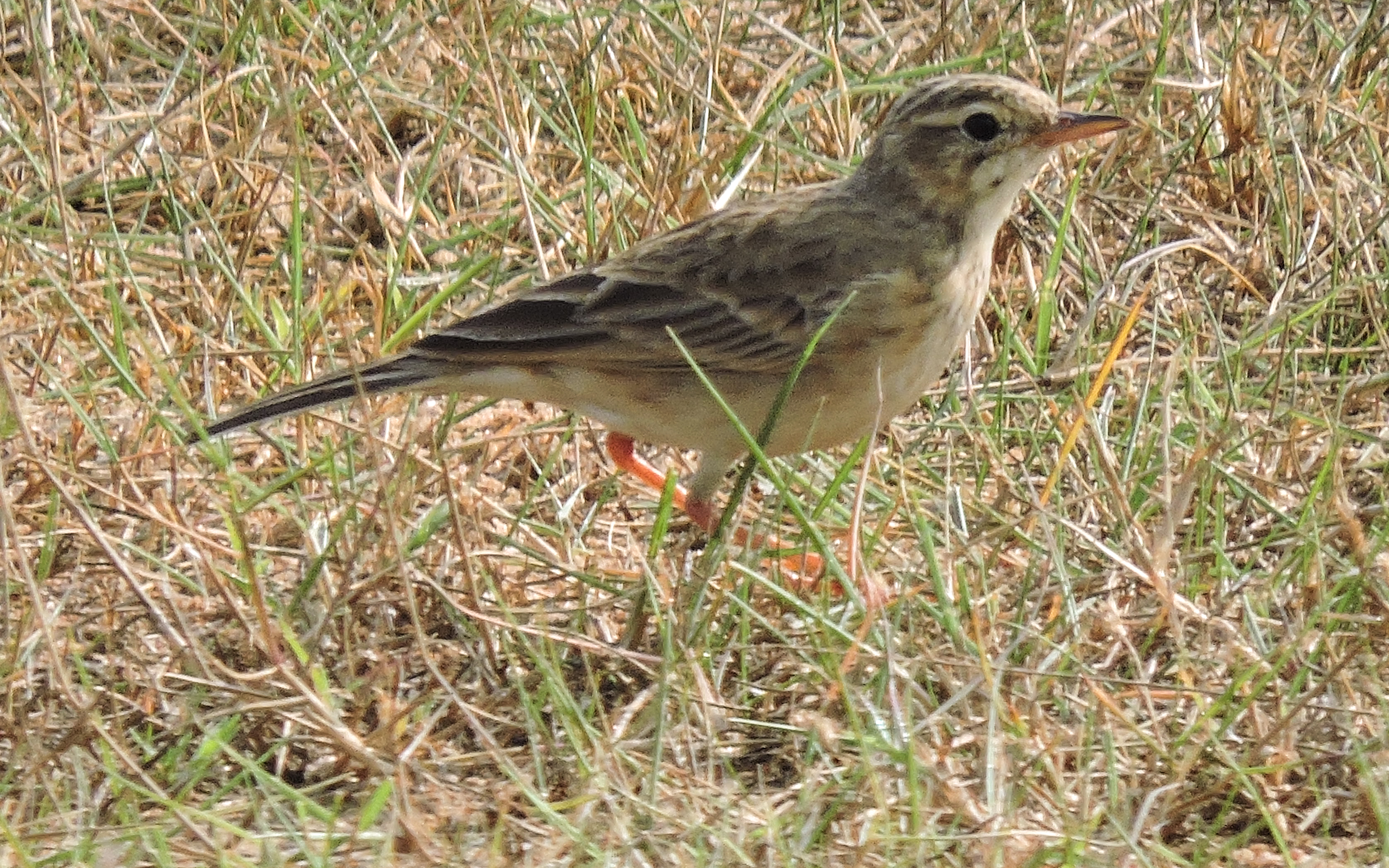
Paddy-field pipit, Dec '20

=== Winter Visitors ===
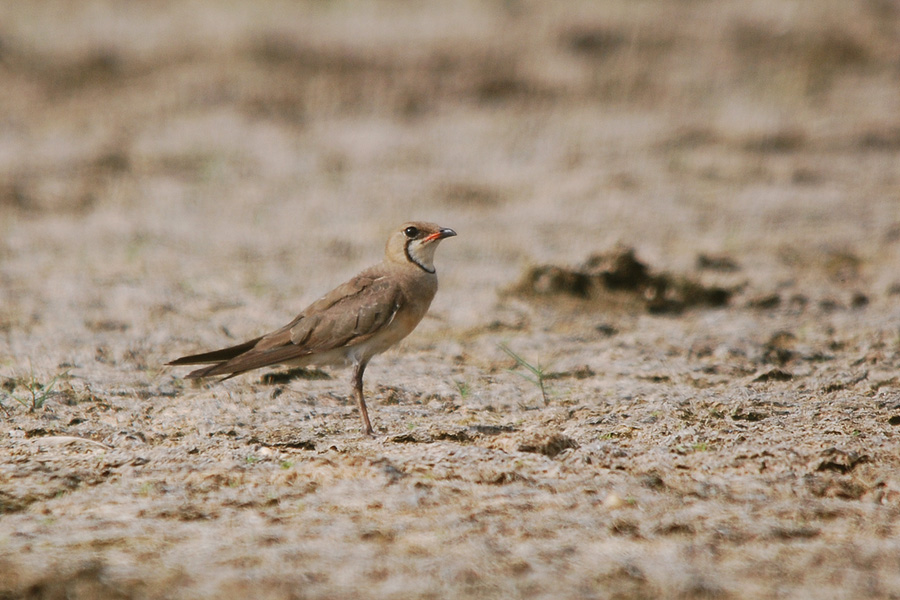
Oriental pratincole

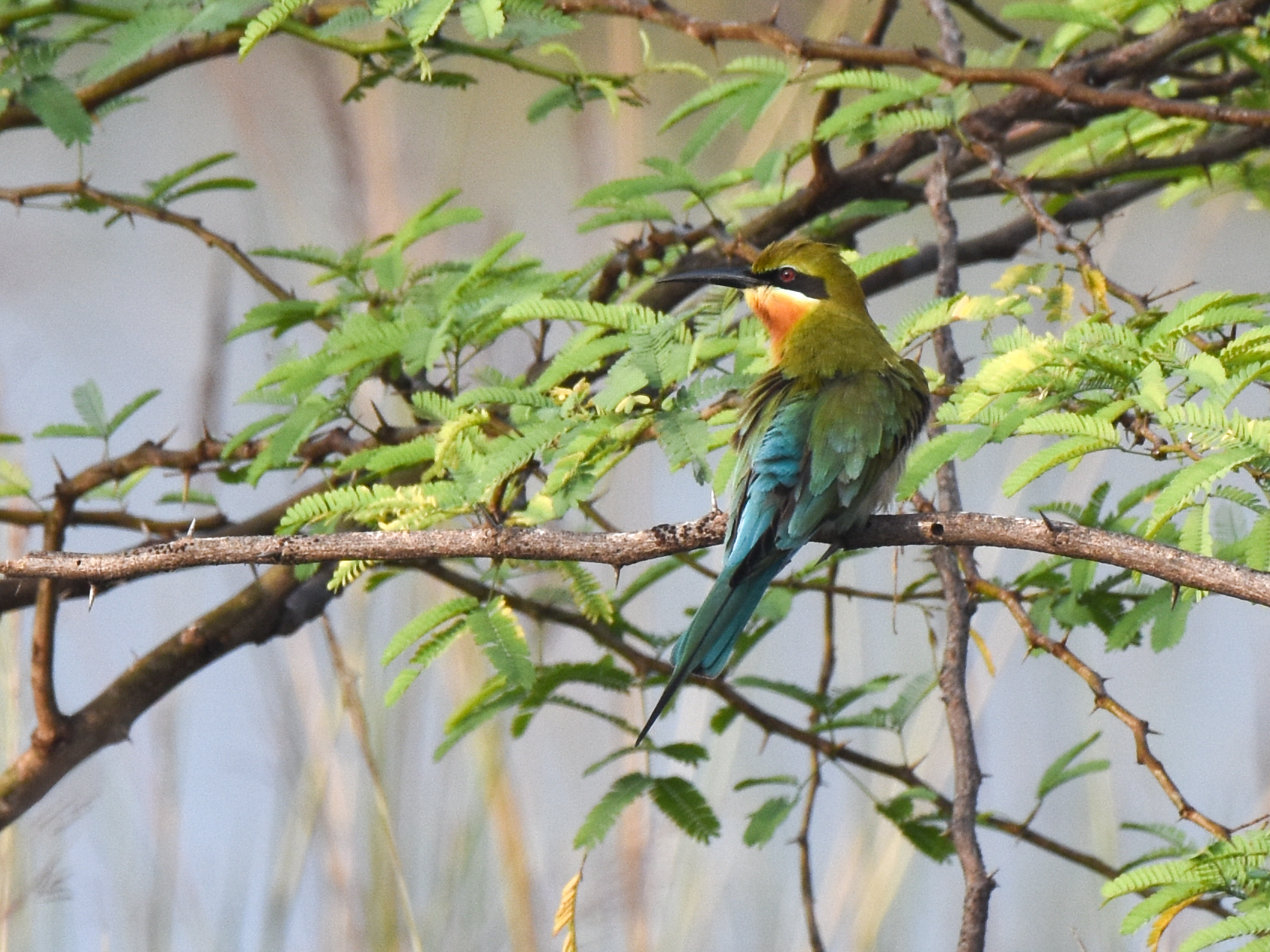
Blue-tailed bee-eater, Jan '21

== See also ==
- Environment of Tamil Nadu
- Birding in Chennai
- R. Grimmett, C. Inskipp & T. Grimmett, Birds of the Indian Subcontinent, Helm Field Guides, ISBN 978-8-1933-1509-5, 2011
- சிறுதாவூர் ஊராட்சி (Sirudavoor Gram Panchayat)
