= Ayanambakkam Lake =

- Location within India
- Location: Chennai district, India
- Coordinates: 13°6′21.13″N 80°8′30.05″E
- Type: lake
- Surface area: 210 acres (85 ha)

Mel Ayanambakkam Lake is one of the clean water lake in Chennai district's locality Mel Ayanambakkam near Thiruverkadu. It is a lake spread over 210 acres (85 ha). This lake is also an important water source for the metropolitan areas of Chennai city.
