= Yellow wagtail =

Yellow wagtail has been split into 2 species:

- Western yellow wagtail, Motacilla flava
- Eastern yellow wagtail, Motacilla tschutschensis
