= Chennai Metropolitan Water Supply and Sewerage Board =

Water supply and sewage treatment agency in Chennai, India

Statutory corporation overview
- Formed: 14 June 1978 (48 years ago)
- Jurisdiction: Government of Tamil Nadu
- Headquarters: Chennai, Tamil Nadu, India
- Minister responsible: C. Joseph Vijay, Minister for Municipal Administration
- Statutory corporation executive: R. Kirlosh Kumar, IAS, Managing Director
- Website: cmwssb.tn.gov.in

Chennai Metropolitan Water Supply and Sewerage Board, known shortly as CMWSSB, is a statutory board of Government of Tamil Nadu which provides water supply and sewage treatment to the city of Chennai and its metropolitan region.

Chennai is one of the metros in India that are dependent mostly on ground water supply. Ground water in Chennai is replenished by rain water and average rainfall in Chennai is 1276 mm. Chennai receives about 985 million liters per day (mld) from various sources against the required amount of 1200 mld and the demand is expected to rise to 2100 mld by 2031. The newly constructed Minjur desalination plant adds another 100 mlds to the city's growing demand.

As of 2012, Chennai Metrowater supplies about 830 million litres of water every day to residents and commercial establishments.

== History of Sewerage Construction and development ==
Till about the mid of 19th century, Chennai received water from local shallow wells and tanks. Fraser, a civil engineer who visited Madras, forwarded a proposal to the government to tap the Kortalayar river which is situated about 160 km northwest of Chennai and it was accepted. The project consisted of a masonry weir across Kortalayar at Tamarapakkam and diverted the water into Cholavaram lake and hence into the Red Hills lake through a channel. The works were completed in 1870 at a cost of about ₹ 1.85 million. In 1872, a Valve House at Red Hills and an earthen supply channel to supply water to Chennai by gravitation was constructed. In early 1890, surface drains in the city were connected to Pumping Stations and the wastewater conveyed for disposal away from inhabitation.

The authorities observed an increase in population in the beginning of the 20th century. Hence, they decided to develop a comprehensive drainage scheme. The proposal for this scheme to cater to the needs of a topographically flat, fast growing city was formulated in 1907 and works were initiated in 1910 and completed during 1914 in stages. The systems were designed for the population of 6.5 lakhs expected in 1961 at 114 lit. per capita per day of water supply. The system originally consisted of a network of force mains and brick gravity sewers served by 3 Pumping Stations at Royapuram, Purasaiwalkam and Napier Park and ultimately discharging wastewater into the sea at Kasimedu on the Northeastern boundary of the city. A fundamental change to this system was made in 1956 by laying a force main to divert part of the sewage discharged from the Purasaiwalkam Pumping Station to Kodungaiyur where the sewage farm was established. The aim of this diversion was to utilise the sewage for irrigation and fertilising agricultural land. But one of the implied benefit of this was the conservation of fresh water whose supply was scarce. Thereafter a comprehensive wastewater management scheme was formulated. The implementation of these schemes commenced in 1961 and had undergone modifications periodically commensurate with the system requirements of an expanding City and the growing population. The wastewater system for the city has been divided into five drainage zones. These zones of macro systems covering the entire City had independent zonal collections, conveyance, treatment and disposal facilities.

Zone-1 covers the areas of Tondaiarpet, Washermenpet, Royapuram, George Town and Chindadripet. Zone-2 comprises areas such as Nungambakkam, Chetpet, Kilpauk, Egmore, Purasaiwalkam, Ayanavaram, Perambur, Vyasarpadi, Sembium, Kolathur, Periyar Nagar, Jawahar Nagar and Kodungaiyur. It is the largest of all zones. Zone–III lies between Zone–II and Zone–IV to the West. It comprises Thyagaraya Nagar, Kodambakkam, Arumbakkam, Anna Nagar and Koyambedu. The areas covered by Zone-4 are Ashok Nagar, Saidapet, Jafferkhanpet, K.K. Nagar and Nesapakkam. Zone–V is the second largest of the five macro systems and is to the South of the City which is bifurcated by the Adyar River. Areas covered are Ice House, Mylapore, Adyar, Guindy, Velacherry, Gandhi Nagar and Indra Nagar.

Therefore, considerable amount of efforts were made by the government to ensure the administration and development of a proper wastewater system in Chennai.

== Reservoirs ==
Chennai has fresh water reservoirs/lakes namely Poondi, Sholavaram, Red Hills, Chembarambakkam and Veeranam cater the daily needs of water for people of Chennai.

Chennai receives most of its water from Poondi Lake (3,231 Mcft), Sholavaram Lake (881 Mcft), Red Hills Lake (3,300 Mcft) and Chembarambakkam Lake (3,645 Mcft).

The Veeranam Water Supply Project was implemented as an additional source of water to Chennai City. The Project was commissioned in the year 2004 to supply 180 MLD of water to Chennai City by drawing water from Veeranam Lake. This lake receives water from Cauvery River system through Kollidam, Lower Anicut and Vadavar Canal besides rainwater from its own catchment area. The capacity of the lake is 1465 mcft. The lake water is treated at Vadakuthu Water Treatment Plant by pumping raw water at a distance of 20 km. from Sethiathope to Vadakuthu through a 1775 mm dia mild steel pipe. The treated water is then pumped at a distance of 8 km. to Break Pressure Tank at Kadampuliyur through a 1750 mm dia mild steel pipe and from there the water is carried to a distance of about 200 km. Through the mild steel pipe of 1875 mm and 1500 mm dia by gravity to Porur Water Distribution Station near Chennai. From this Distribution Station, water is pumped to a distance of 1.2 km. and distributed to Chennai City through Trunk mains and Water Distribution stations.

== Reverse Osmosis and Desalination ==
Chennai has Reverse osmosis plants namely at Velachery, Nochikuppam, Kasimedu, and Ayodhyakuppam. It takes raw Brackish water from bore wells, store in tanks and then purifies it before supply.

Desalination plant is located at Kattupalli, Minjur. The Chennai Water Desalination Ltd. (CWDL) is setting the plant infrastructure and maintaining the plant for 25 years as per agreement between CWDL and CMWSSB. The CMWSSB purchase water from them and supplies to the city network through Madhavaram Booster Station.

In an effort to alleviate the woes of Chennaiites, Tamil Nadu Government has forged into projects acquiring fresh water by desalinating sea water. The first such desalination plant was built in 60 acres (240,000 m^{2}) in Kattupalli village near Minjur about 35 km north of Chennai. Minjur desalination plant which supplies 100 million litres a day water to Chennai city was inaugurated on 31 July 2010. Second water desalination plant of 100mld capacity constructed and commissioned at Nemmeli, South of Chennai City. Besides two new Sea Water Reverse Osmosis Plants (SWRO) are proposed of 150mld (funded under KFW) at Nemmeli and 400mld (funded under JICA) at Perur are proposed for catering to Chennai Water Supply.(Reference: Municipal Administration and Water Supply department of Government of Tamil Nadu, Policy Note 2015 -2016)

The Water Treatment Plants are:

- Kilpauk Water Treatment Plant: 270 MLD
- Puzhal Water Treatment Plant: 300 MLD
- Vadakuthu Water Treatment Plant (Veeranam Lake source): 180 MLD
- Chembarambakkam Water Treatment Plant: 530 MLD

== Sewage ==
Chennai City Sewerage System was designed in 1910 for an estimated 1961 population of 6.6 lakhs. A comprehensive improvement to the city sewage system was designed in 1958 for an estimated 1976 population of 25.5 lakhs and 1991 population of 27.2 lakhs at a sewage flow rate of 110 lpcd in 1976 and 180 lpcd in 1991; the city was also divided into five zones with proposals for five independent disposal works. It was planned to isolate the system of collection, transmission and disposal of sewage in each zone in order to obviate the difficulties of the relay system. Presently the sewerage network in Chennai city has covered 98% of its area. As the capacity of sewers was limited, during rainy days they became surcharged due to ingress of storm water. Any surplus of sewage in excess of pumping stations capacity was drained into the nearby natural water courses of the city viz. Cooum river, Adyar river, Buckingham canal and Otteri Nalla. The following are the Sewage Treatment Plants of CMWSSB as of February 2016:

- Kodungaiyur 270mld (110+80+80)
- Villivakkam 5mld
- Koyambedu 214mld (34+60+120)
- Nesapakkam 117mld (23+40+54)
- Perungudi including Alandur and considering BOD and SS load 163mld 79 (instead of installed 54) +72 (instead of installed 60) +12 totaling to 769mld (million litres per day) in 13 units of which 535mld is powered by biogas (produced during the Sewage Treatment) engines (Reference: Municipal Administration and Water Supply Department of Government of Tamil Nadu Policy Note 2015–2016, page 223). Besides two sewage treatment plants are under construction at Thiruvatriyur (31mld) and Sholinganallur (18mld).

== Rain Water Harvesting ==
The importance of conservation of water and rainwater harvesting can not be understated. While issuing Planning Permission for construction of major developments such as flats, residential developments, office, shopping and other commercial complexes, the condition to provide rain water-harvesting structures within the premises was put and ensured to be provided before issue of Completion Certificates. Provision of rainwater structures in all types of developments, irrespective of size or use was made mandatory by amending DCR and Building Byelaws in the year 2001, not only for the buildings proposed to be constructed but also for all the existing buildings. After implementation of this scheme widely in CMA, a significant increase in the ground water levels and also quality of ground water was noted.

== Contamination ==
The water quality in Chennai is a long way to reach International standards as outlined in this study published in April 2007. Researchers from National Environmental Engineering Research Institute, Chennai Zonal Laboratory, Chennai found Cryptosporidium oocytes in Chennai water. Cryptosporidium is an enteric parasitic protozoan capable of causing diarrhea.

== Expansion ==
As of 2011, MetroWater is catering for a population of 5 million. With the expansion of the corporation area in 2011 from 174 sq km to 426 sq km, which increased the number of wards of the Chennai Corporation from 155 to 200 and the number of zones from 10 to 15, MetroWater's customer base is expected to increase by an additional 1.7 million when the new areas are covered. The number of area offices of MetroWater would also be changed to correspond with the corporation's zones. While the existing 155 depot offices of MetroWater would be reduced to 107, 93 new depot offices would be added from merged areas. At present, each depot office serves a population of about 50,000. Since two or three wards have been merged into one, the coverage of the depot office would increase by 20,000. There are also proposals to construct sewage treatment plants in Mangadu and Villivakkam as part of the plans to build new infrastructure for the newly merged areas.

The growth in the sewerage services compared to 1978 when the C.M.W.S.S. Board was formed until May 2017 are as below:

Details	1978	March 2017
Area covered	74%	100%
No. of dwellings with sewer connections	1,15,000	5,98,249
Length of sewer mains	1,223 km.	2,677 km.
No. of pumping stations	58	196
Treatment Plants	3 nos.	5 nos.
Treatment capacity	57 MLD	486 MLD

== Environment protection ==
The Chennai Metropolitan Water Supply and Sewage Board and Chennai Smart City has shown its concern for environment through its sewage treatment process. In this process, bio-gas is produced and is being used to produce power to run the plants. This incidentally reduces the discharge of Green House Gas into the atmosphere and provides for Carbon Trading. CMWSS Board has adopted Clean Development Mechanism (CDM) which leads to savings in energy cost to a turn of Rs.43.05 lakhs per month.

== See also ==
- Water management in Chennai
- Water supply and sanitation in India
- Telugu Ganga project
