= Grant Lyon =

Grand Lyon கிராண்ட் லயன்
- Neighbourhood
- Location within Chennai Location within Tamil Nadu Location within India
- Coordinates: 13.185798°N 80.202924°E
- Country: India
- State: Tamil Nadu
- District: Thiruvallur
- Metro: Chennai
- Elevation: 10 m (33 ft)

Languages
  - Official: Tamil
- Time zone: UTC+5:30 (IST)
- PIN: 600052
- Telephone code: 044
- Vehicle registration: TN-20-xxxx & TN-18-xxxx(new)
- Planning agency: CMDA
- City: Chennai
- Lok Sabha constituency: Thiruvallur
- Vidhan Sabha constituency: Madhavaram

Grand Lyon (Tamil: கிராண்ட் லயன்), is a developing residential area and suburban area in North Chennai, a metropolitan city in Tamil Nadu, India. Grand Lyon village is well connected with Red Hills and Puzhal which has good transportation.good water facilities.

== Location ==
Grant Lyon is located in North Chennai with Red Hills in the west and Puzhal to the South. Other neighbouring areas include Vadagarai, Pulli Lyon, Athivakkam. Grant Lyon is located in between Vadagarai and Vadaperumbakkam in Madhavaram-Red Hills High Road, and very close to Puzhal aeri. Don Bosco school caters to the needs of the area.
