= Pulli Lyon =

Pulli Lyon புள்ளி லயன்
- Neighbourhood
- Location within Chennai Location within Tamil Nadu Location within India
- Coordinates: 13.194924°N 80.193923°E
- Country: India
- State: Tamil Nadu
- District: Thiruvallur
- Metro: Chennai
- Elevation: 10 m (33 ft)

Languages
  - Official: Tamil
- Time zone: UTC+5:30 (IST)
- PIN: 600052
- Telephone code: 044
- Vehicle registration: TN-20-xxxx & TN-18-xxxx(new)
- Planning agency: CMDA
- City: Chennai
- Lok Sabha constituency: Thiruvallur
- Vidhan Sabha constituency: Madhavaram

Pulli Lyon or Lyon Grant (Tamil: புள்ளி லயன்), is a developing residential area and suburban area in North Chennai, a metropolitan city in Tamil Nadu, India. Pulli Lyon is well connected with Red Hills.

== Location ==
Pulli Lyon is located in North Chennai with Red Hills in the west and Puzhal to the South. Other neighbouring areas include Vadagarai, Grant Lyon, Athivakkam. Pulli Lyon is located next to Red Hills and very close to Puzhal aeri.
