= Retteri junction =

Road intersection in Chennai district, Tamil Nadu, India

- Interactive map of Retteri junction

Location
- Kolathur, Chennai, Tamil Nadu, India
- Coordinates: 13.130240°N 80.213790°E
- Roads at junction: 4

Construction
- Spans: 27
- Lanes: 2
- Opened: 2021
- Maintained by: State Highways Department, Tamil Nadu

Retteri junction is an important road intersection at Kolathur of Chennai district, Tamil Nadu in India. It is located at the intersection of Jawaharlal Nehru Salai, and Perambur - Red Hills road at Kolathur. It is also used by heavy vehicles such as containers that lead to Ennore port. Vehicles come from Anna Nagar via. Padi Junction pass through this Retteri junction. Also, vehicles to and fro Red Hills via. Puzhal pass through this junction. And also, this junction is crossed by vehicles to and fro Madhavaram. Vehicles to and fro Perambur, also pass through Retteri junction.

== Location ==
Located at an altitude of about 36 m above the mean sea level, the geographical coordinates of Retteri junction are 13°07'48.9"N, 80°12'49.6"E (i.e., 13.130240°N, 80.213790°E).

== Transport ==
=== Flyovers ===
There are two flyovers pass through this junction. One flyover with the length of 740 m, was built at a project cost of ₹55.25 crore. This connects Anna Nagar to Madhavaram via. Retteri junction. There are two service roads each 280 m long run on either side of the flyover. This flyover was opened during the month of November, in the year 2016. Another flyover running parallel to the first one is 1,320 m long built at a project cost of ₹41.07 crore, that connects Madhavaram to Anna Nagar via. Retteri junction. This second flyover was opened during the month of December, in the year 2021. There is a pedestrian subway constructed on Jawaharlal Nehru Salai at Retteri junction, under the two flyovers.

=== Metro line ===
The Second phase and 5th corridor of Metro line of Chennai is planned to construct at a stretch of 47 km out of which about 41.2 km will be overhead line and the remaining of about 5.8 km will be underground line. This route starts from Madhavaram end ends at Sholinganallur via. Retteri junction. From Madhavaram to Retteri junction, the metro line is being constructed as an elevated corridor. For this, pillar construction works are finished and bridge works are on progress. From Retteri junction, an underground metro line to Nathamuni metro in Villivakkam area, a 5 km stretch project will be carried out by Larsen & Toubro limited. Four heavy duty underground drilling machines are going to be used for this purpose. CMRL (Chennai Metro Railway Limited) has planned that elevated corridor in this project will be finished by the year 2025 and underground tunnelling project will be finished by the year 2026.

On 1 September 2022, on carrying out piling works by rigging machine, the machine tumbled near the flyover and fell over it causing a little damage to it. No victims found even though there were about 30 employees working on the spot.

== Small buses ==
Small buses ply between Retteri junction and Madhavaram route and also between Madhavaram and Retteri junction, where long bus services do not pass through.
