= Thervoy Kandigai Reservoir =

Reservoir in Tamil Nadu, India

Thervoy Kandigai Reservoir is the fifth major reservoir built to satisfy drinking water needs of Chennai city. The reservoir was constructed by combining Thervoy Kandigai and Kannankottai lakes in Thiruvallur district. It was commissioned by Amit Shah, Internal Affairs minister of India, on 21 November 2020. Water levels in the reservoir reached its full capacity on 11 March 2021 for the first time.

== History ==
To solve the growing drinking water needs of Chennai city, then Chief minister J. Jayalalitha announced the Thervoy Kandigai reservoir in the year 2012. After acquiring 1485 acres of land in Thiruvallur district, the reservoir was constructed at a cost of Rs 380 crore. The project got delayed after facing issues with land acquisition & later resumed only by 2018. Advocate B.Jagannath of the Madras High Court had filed the case to increase Water Storage Capacity through PIL Before Madras High Court Satyanarayana Bench in July,2019 - which included opening of Thervoy Kandigai Lake

== Purpose ==
The reservoir is planned to store excess water flowing from Krishna in Kandaleru-Poondi canal. A separate 8.6 km-long canal was built to draw water from the canal. This reservoir can store up to 1 tmcft of water

== See also ==
- Birding in Chennai
- Puzhal lake
- Water management in Chennai
