= Water management in Chennai =

The coastal city of Chennai has a metropolitan population of 10.6 million as per 2019 census. As the city lacks a perennial water source, catering the water requirements of the population has remained an arduous task. On 18 June 2019, the city's reservoirs ran dry, leaving the city in severe crisis.

Although three rivers flow through the metropolitan region and drain into the Bay of Bengal, Chennai has historically relied on annual monsoon rains to replenish its water reservoirs since the rivers are polluted with sewage. With the population increasing over the decades, the city has faced water supply shortages, and its ground water levels have been depleted. An earlier Veeranam Lake project aimed at augmenting the city's water supply failed. However, the New Veeranam project, which became operational in September 2004, has greatly reduced dependency on distant sources. In recent years, heavy and consistent monsoon rains and rainwater harvesting (RWH) by Chennai Metro Water at its Anna Nagar Rain Centre have significantly reduced water shortages. Moreover, newer projects like the Telugu Ganga project, which brings water from rivers such as the Krishna River in Andhra Pradesh, have eased water shortages. The city has constructed a couple of sea water desalination plants to further increase the water supply, with the two functioning since 2010 and 2013, respectively. A third one has been planned. However, Chennai is expected to face a huge deficit of 713 million litres per day (MLD) as the demand is projected at 2,248 MLD and supply estimated at only 1,535 MLD in 2026. As of 2017, the total volume of water harvested was 339 mcft and groundwater recharge was 170 mcft.

The expanded Chennai Metropolitan Area (CMA) has nearly 4,100 water bodies, with a potential storage capacity of 150,000 million cubic feet.

== History ==
Year	Volume of water harvested (mcft)	Groundwater recharge (mcft)
1893	1,335	667
1954	1,038	519
1973	689	344
2006	371	185
2017	339	170

Until the middle of the 19th century, Chennai city received water from shallow wells and tanks, such as the Nungambakkam tank, in the region. The first proposal to tap water from Kortalayar river situated about 160 km northwest of the city was forwarded by Fraser, a civil engineer. The ₹ 1.85-million project involved construction of a masonry weir across Kortalayar River at Tamaraipakkam and diverting the water into Cholavaram lake and further into the Red Hills Lake by means of a channel. This established the first scientifically designed water distribution system in the city. The primary works were completed in 1870, and in 1872, a valve house at Red Hills and a gravity-aided earthen supply channel to supply water were built. Within the city, water was delivered by gravity into a masonry shaft at Kilpauk, where the channel ended. From here, the cast iron mains of the city branched off to carry water to different parts of the city. According to J. W. Madeley, a pioneer of Chennai water supply and sewerage system during 1914–1918, these were considered sufficient for an anticipated population of 660,000 in 1961 at a rate of 25 gallons per head per day. However, the need for further improvement was felt in 1936.

Estimates say that the expanse of water bodies in and around Chennai contracted from 12.6 square kilometers in 1893 to 3.2 square kilometers in 2017. There were about 60 large water bodies in the Chennai area at one time, but as of 2017, they have come down to just 28, most of which are small.

== Primary water sources ==
Chennai is entirely dependent on ground water resources to meet its water needs. Ground water resources in Chennai are replenished by rainwater and the city's average rainfall is 1,276 mm. Chennai receives about 985 million liters per day (mld) from various sources against the required amount of 1,200 mld. This demand is expected to rise to 2,100 mld by 2031. Water to the city's residents is being supplied from desalination plants at Nemelli and Minjur; aquifers in Neyveli, Minjur and Panchetty; Cauvery water from Veeranam Lake; Krishna River from Andhra Pradesh; Poondi reservoir; and lakes at Red Hills, Chembarambakkam and Sholavaram.

Supply of ground water to the residents and sewage management in Chennai is taken care of by the Chennai Metropolitan Water Supply and Sewage Board (MetroWater). As of 2011, MetroWater is catering for a population of 5 million. With the expansion of the corporation area from 174 sq km to 426 sq km, which increased the number of wards of the Chennai Corporation from 155 to 200 and the number of zones from 10 to 15, MetroWater's customer base is expected to increase by an additional 1.7 million when the new areas are covered. As of 2012, MetroWater supplies about 830 million litres of water every day to residents and commercial establishments. Of about 800 mld supplied to the city, nearly 710 mld is transmitted through pipeline. It is estimated that the demand of the expanded city would be 1,044 mld. Similarly, MetroWater has to provide infrastructure to treat and dispose an additional 219 mld of sewage estimated to be generated in the merged areas.

Chennai, after having grown into a metropolis, is now the Chennai Metropolitan Area (CMA) for planning purposes. The CMA has 22 water courses, including three rivers, a canal, and four reservoir tanks. This also includes 16 minor waterways.

The city has three rivers flowing into the Bay of Bengal, namely, the Cooum, the Adyar, and the Kosasthalaiyar, which divide the city into north–south sections. The Buckingham canal connects all the three rivers.

There are four reservoirs in the city, namely, Red Hills, Cholavaram, Poondi and Chembarambakkam, with a combined capacity of 11,057 mcft. The Red Hills reservoir has a capacity of 3,300 mcft. The Cholavaram reservoir has a capacity of 881 mcft. The Poondi reservoir has a capacity of 3,231 mcft. The Chembarambakkam reservoir has a capacity of 3,645 mcft. The reservoirs lose 5 mcft daily due to evaporation. A fifth reservoir is being planned.

According to the records of the Water Resources Department, only 19 of the 29 major waterbodies in the city's periphery can be restored. Nine lakes cannot be rejuvenated owing to encroachments, including those in Valasaravakkam, Virugambakkam, Mogappair, Adambakkam, Kolathur, Senneerkuppam, Thalakancheri, Ullagaram, and Maduravoyal. Once rejuvenated completely, the remaining lakes will have a combined storage capacity of 1,000 million cubic feet (mcft). In addition, if the four primary reservoirs are desilted by a metre, an additional water volume of about 500 mcft can be stored.

The city supplies 830 million litres of water per day. The city will get additional 1030 mld from sources such as Minjur desalination plant (100 mld), Krishna water (500 mld), Nemeli desalination plant (100 mld), Nemeli desalination plant-2 (150 mld) and Cauvery water from Veeranam Tank (180 mld). In 2026 planned to get another additional 400 mld from Perur Desalination Plant which is the fourth Desalination Plant in the City.

By December 2013, with the Nemmeli plant's contribution going up from 80 to 100 MLD, the desalination plants in Nemmeli and Minjur and the new Veeranam project contribute more than 60 percent of the city's supply, which then was 575 MLD.

It is estimated that as many as 3,600 tanks in and around the Chennai metro area (covering the whole of Kancheepuram and Tiruvallur districts), if properly preserved and networked, can provide five times the quantum of water that the city needs in normal times. Water harnessed through these tanks is estimated to be about 80,000 million cubic feet (TMC).

As of 2018, nearly 50 to 60 percent of the water supplied in Chennai and its suburbs is through private water tankers, which supply about 20,000 tanker loads of water every day, sourced from areas such as Mambakkam, Tiruporur, Poonamallee, Ayapakkam, and Manjambakkam. About 80 percent of households in the Chennai Metropolitan Area consume packaged drinking water. About 20 million liters of packaged drinking water are sold in the city daily.

=== Management of the resources ===
==== Water level and quality ====
The water level varies between different regions of the city, such as sandy, clay, and rock areas. Sandy areas include New Washermenpet, George Town, Manali, Porur and Besant Nagar, where the water level stood between 5 m and 6 m in 2012. Clay areas include Kolathur, Pulianthope, Ambattur, Sholinganallur, K.K.Nagar and Virugambakkam, where the level was at 5.5 m to 6 m in 2012. Hard rock areas include Guindy, Perungudi, Taramani and Velachery, where the level stood at 6.5 metre in the same period. Unlike sandy area, recharge and dip in water level in hard rock areas is faster. The water quality too varies across the city. In 2012, the level of total dissolved solids ranged between 600 parts per million (ppm) and 1,500 ppm across the city against the permissible limit of 500 ppm.

The water level and quality is monitored by the Metrowater from 145 observation wells spread across the expanded city. As of 2012, the average water level in the city ranges between 5 and 6 metre. The water level dips to its maximum during June when there is not much recharge. The level raises to a shallow depth of 1.5 m to 2m in January, immediately after the northeast monsoon.

Although Chennai scores high in the working ratio in water utility, a measure of their operational efficiency, financial health and stability, compared to most of the other Indian cities, it still shows a poor working ratio, according to a study by Ernst & Young.

In 2012, the Chennai Corporation began work on construction of 5,000 rainwater harvesting structures in stormwater drains.

==== Treatment plants ====
Chennai has reverse osmosis plants, namely, at Velachery, Nochikuppam, Kasimedu, and Ayodhyakuppam. The plants take in raw brackish water from bore wells, store in tanks, and then purify before supply.

Water treatment plants are located at Kilpauk (270 mld), Puzhal (300 mld), Vadakuthu (Veeranam Lake source) (180 mld), and Chembarambakkam (530 mld).

== Sewage management ==
=== Sewage ===
As of 2019, Chennai generates 550 million liters of sewage every day. The sewage system in the city was designed in 1910 for an estimated 1961 population of 660,000. Some modifications were in 1958. A comprehensive improvement to the city sewerage system was designed in 1958 for an estimated 1976 population of 2.55 million and a 1991 population of 2.72 million at a sewage flow rate of 110 lpcd in 1976 and 180 lpcd in 1991. The city was divided into five zones with proposals for five independent disposal works. It was planned to isolate the system of collection, transmission and disposal of sewage in each zone in order to obviate the difficulties of the relay system. Presently, the sewerage network in Chennai city has covered 98 percent of its old area covering 174 sq km. As the capacity of sewers was limited, during rainy days they became surcharged due to ingress of storm water. Any surplus of sewage in excess of pumping stations capacity was drained into the nearby natural water courses of the city, namely, Cooum river, Adyar river, Buckingham canal and Otteri nullah.

=== Sewage treatment ===
Until 2005–06, the total capacity of the sewage treatment plants in the city was 222 million litres a day. With the JNNURM project, there was a capacity addition in the city and its periphery with the total volume rising to 486 MLD. As of 2011, another two plants with a total capacity of 114 MLD were under construction.

=== Tertiary treatment plant ===
In October 2019, a 45-MLD tertiary treatment plant began its operations at Kodungaiyur.

A ₹4,862.1-million second tertiary treatment plant at Koyambedu with a capacity of 45 million liters a day (MLD) started functioning from November 2019. It caters to the SIPCOT industrial belt in Irungattukottai, Sriperumbudur and Oragadam. This freed up nearly 25 MLD of freshwater from Chembarambakkam lake that had been provided for industrial use so far for domestic water supply. The treated wastewater will be supplied to 691 industries through a 60-km-long pipeline. The Koyambedu plant is India's largest tertiary treatment reverse osmosis plant.

There are provisions to increase each of these plant's capacity to 60 MLD. These plants treat and reuse nearly 20 percent of the sewage generated in the city.

== Water projects ==
=== Brought-in water projects ===
==== New Veeranam Project ====
In 2004, during Jayalalitha's regime, the New Veeranam Project was inaugurated to supply 180 MLD water to Chennai as additional source of water, drawing water from Veeranam Lake. Located about 225 km south of Chennai, the tank is situated in the tail of the Cauvery river system in the state as it gets the supply through the Vadavar channel from the Lower Anicut on the Coleroon (Kollidam) besides rainwater from its own catchment area. The capacity of the lake is 1,465 mcft. According to the Policy Note of the State Municipal Administration and Water Supply Department for 2012–2013, MetroWater supplies about 765 MLD to domestic consumers in the city and about 65 MLD of water to bulk consumers such as adjacent local bodies and industries located in the Chennai Metropolitan Area.

Mechanism

The lake water is treated at Vadakuthu Water Treatment Plant by pumping raw water at a distance of 20 km from Sethiathope to Vadakuthu through 1,775 mm diameter mild steel pipe. The treated water is then pumped at a distance of 8 km to break pressure tank at Kadampuliyur through 1,750 mm diameter mild steel pipe, from where the water is conveyed to a distance of about 230 km through the mild steel pipe of 1,875 mm and 1,500 mm dia by gravity to Porur water distribution station in Chennai. From this distribution station, water is pumped to a distance of 1.2 km and distributed to Chennai city through trunk mains and water distribution stations.

=== Desalination projects ===
==== Minjur desalination plant ====
The first seawater desalination plant in the city was commissioned in July 2010 at Minjur with a capacity of 100 mld.

==== Nemmeli Desalination Plant ====
The second desalination plant was commissioned at Nemmeli in February 2013 and the city got an additional supply of 100 mld of water.

==== Third desalination plant ====
The third desalination plant near the Nemmeli plant with a capacity of 150 MLD at a cost of ₹ 12,593.8 million, planned in 2013, being built on a 10.50-acre plot of vacant land near the existing plant at Nemmeli is expected to be completed by December 2021.

==== Fourth desalination plant ====
In 2018, the fourth desalination plant was planned at Perur along the East Coast Road with a capacity to treat 400 million liters of water a day at a cost of ₹ 39,121.6 million. As of 2019, the cost increased to ₹ 60,780 million and is expected to be completed by 2024 when it will serve 2.3 million people in southern suburbs of Chennai and areas such as Virugambakkam and Porur.

=== Thervoykandigai Reservoir ===
In November 2012, the state government sought permission from the Union ministry of environment and forests for environmental clearance to build a one-tmcft reservoir at Thervoykandigai in Tiruvallur district to augment drinking water supply for the city, which if realized, would become the fifth reservoir in the metropolitan region. As the project alignment also included about 56 acres of reserve forest area, the state also sought clearance from the forest department. The reservoir will be built by linking Kannankottai and Thervoykandigai tanks. To carry water to the new reservoir, an off-take canal from Kandaleru–Poondi canal for about 8.3 km will be built. The state also initiated the acquisition of 1.378.16 acres, roughly estimated to cost ₹ 1,600 million. The Thervoy Kandigai reservoir commissioned on 21 November 2020. The reservoir has been constructed at a cost of Rs 380 crore and around 1,485 acres of land acquired

== Future projects ==
The existing reservoir capacity is expected to be augmented by 4.20 TMC ft at a cost of ₹ 18,510 million. The new storage capacity will be created at Thervaikandigai, Thirukandalam and Ramanjeri by 1 TMC ft each. Another 0.9 TMC ft will be added by restoring six tanks, namely, Nemam, Porur, Iyambakkam, Ambattur, Korattur and Madhavaram and a further 0.3 TMC ft by deepening the Cholavaram tank. There is also a proposal to build a 400-MLD desalination plant to fill the present gap in water supply in the city. In 2011, the Chief Minister ordered desilting of few more lakes in the metropolitan area at a cost of ₹ 1,300 million. The Cholavaram lake will be desilted and strengthened at a cost of ₹ 5 million and the capacity will be increased to 1,080 million tmc ft. The Porur lake will be desilted and deepened further at a cost of ₹ 200 million and its capacity will be increased to 70 million tmc ft. The banks of Ayanambakkam lake will be strengthened, the water body will be deepened and its capacity will be increased to 314 million tmc ft at a cost of ₹ 300 million. The Nemam lake will be refurbished and its capacity will be increased to 577 million tmc ft at a total cost of ₹ 795 million. A total of 568 million tmc ft water can be stored additionally in these lakes with this initiative.

In October 2013, the Ministry of Earth Sciences and the Tamil Nadu government proposed to set up a 10 MLD low-temperature thermal desalination plant about 40 km from Chennai. A detailed project report is being prepared by Larsen and Toubro and the National Institute of Ocean Technology (NIOT), which is expected to complete the report in 18 months. The operating cost of producing per litre of water in the barge-mounted desalination plant is 19 paise.

With the city's water supply position remaining grim over the past few years owing to considerable reduction in water flowing into Chennai's drinking water reservoirs, Tamil Nadu government has cleared yet another desalination plant at Nemmeli on East Coast Road. The plant, with a capacity of 150 MLD, is estimated to cost ₹ 13,720 million.

== See also ==
- Chennai MetroWater Supply and Sewage Board
- 2015 South Indian floods
