= Gudiyam Cave =

Caves and archaeological site in India

- குடியம் குகை (Tamil)
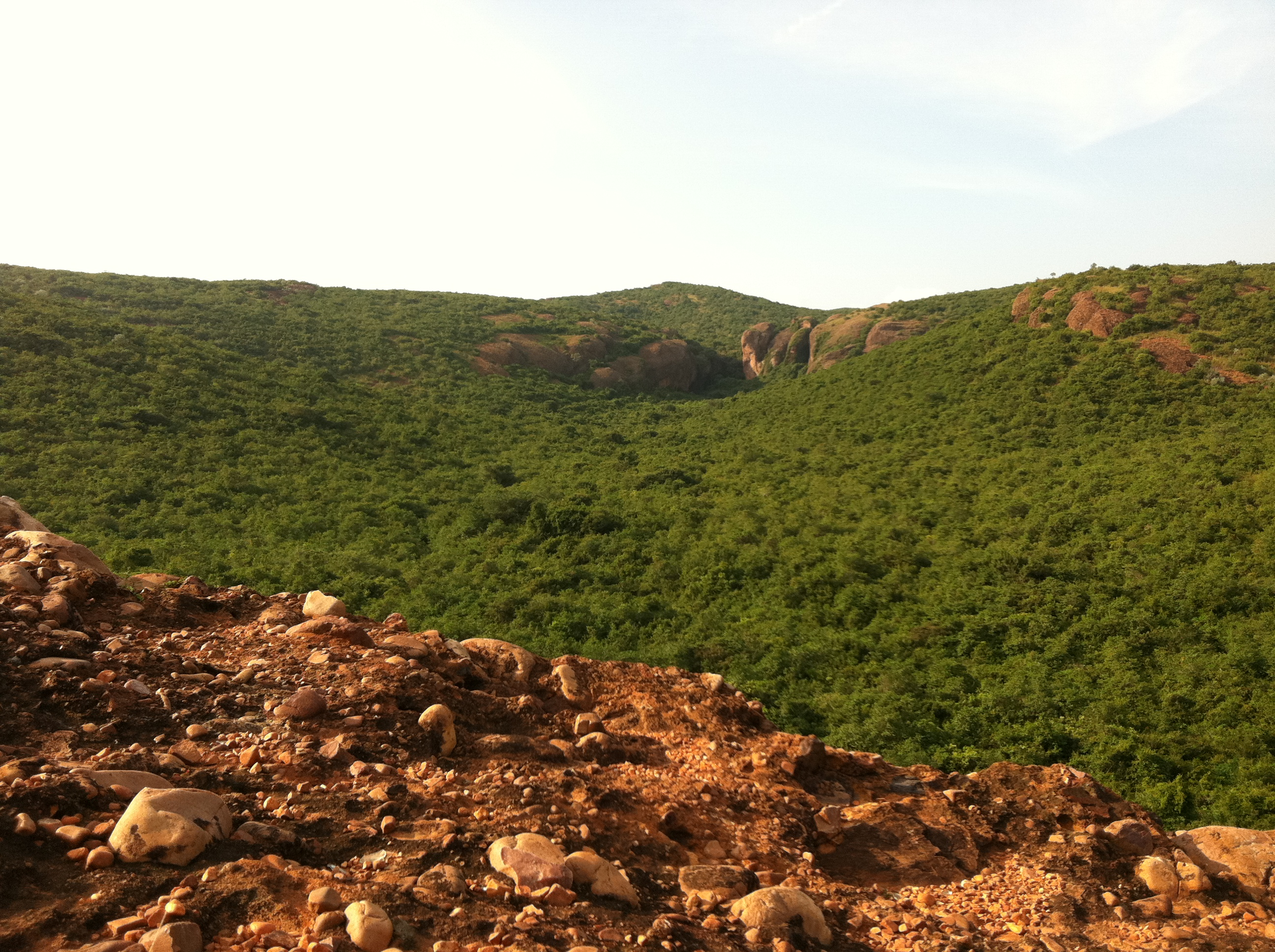
- Gudiyam Cave

- location in India
- 13°11′8.73″N 79°51′27.6″E
- Location: near Poondi reservoir, Thiruvallur district, Tamil Nadu

Site notes
- Archaeologists: Robert Bruce Foote (19th century), K.D. Banerjee [A.S.I.] (1962–64)
- Owner: Tamil Nadu Forest Department

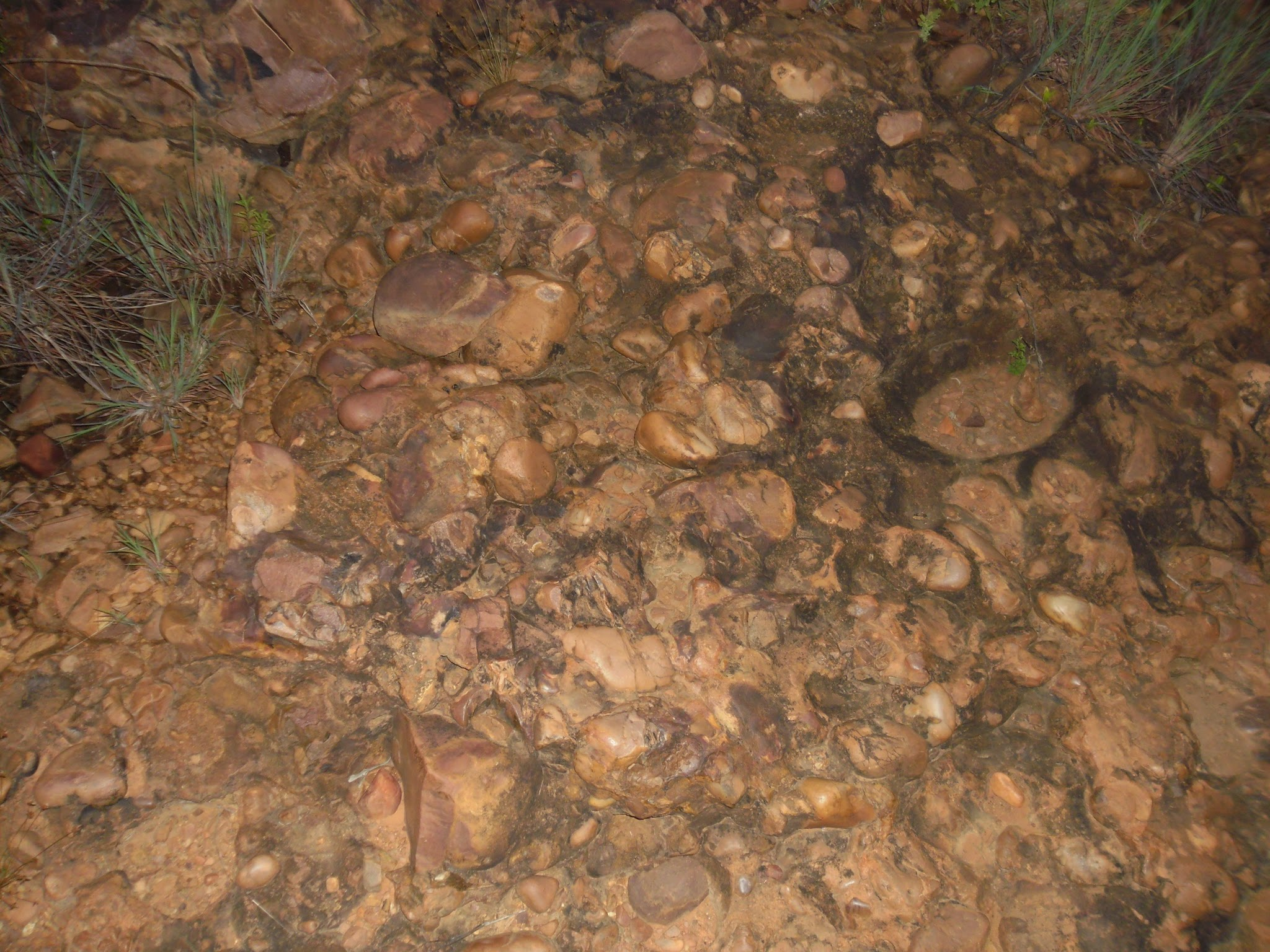
Geological formation

Gudiyam Caves are rock shelters situated in Thiruvallur district, Tamil Nadu, India. Archaeological evidence suggests that the caves were used by Paleolithic humans.

== Location ==
The caves are located near the Poondi reservoir, 60 km (37.3 mi) from the State capital Chennai.

== History ==
They were first identified by British geologist Robert Bruce Foote.

The site has been excavated by the Archaeological Survey of India in 1963 and 1964. Systematic paleolithic studies in this region indicate these sites suggest extensive movement of early hominids across the landscape about 200,000 years ago. Sixteen such shelters have been identified by the Archaeological Survey of India in Allikulli Hill ranges near Poondi.

== Legacy ==
In 2015 Director Ramesh Yanthra released the short documentary film Gudiyam Caves, which was screened at the Cannes Film Festival.
