= Dr. M. S. Swaminathan Wetland Eco Park =

Park in Chennai, India

- Interactive map of Dr. M. S. Swaminathan Wetland Eco Park
- Type: Urban park
- Location: Porur in Chennai, India
- Coordinates: 13.039200°N 80.146500°E
- Created: 2025
- Operator: Chennai Metropolitan Development Authority
- Status: Open all year

Dr. M. S. Swaminathan Wetland Eco Park is an urban park in the city of Chennai, India. Created with an initial investment of Rs. 20 crores and inaugurated by the Chief Minister of Tamil Nadu, M. K. Stalin at Thelliyar Agaram on the outskirts of Chennai on 7 March 2025, the park is named after Indian agricultural scientist and Bharat Ratna awardee, M. S. Swaminathan who was instrumental in creation of the eco park and passed away a few months before its opening. The park is situated on the northern shores of the Porur Lake and maintained by the Chennai Metropolitan Development Authority (CMDA).

== History ==
Dr. M. S. Swaminathan Wetland Eco Park was created from a portion of the Sri Ramachandra Institute of Higher Education and Research campus that was situated in the flood plain of the Porur Lake. The wetland eco park is equipped with an information centre to educate visitors about different types of wetland ecosystems as well as a children's park, an outdoor gymnasium and a foodcourt and motor-boating facilities for recreational purposes.
