= Thelliyar Agaram =

Suburb of Chennai in Tamil Nadu, India

- Neighbourhood
- Thelliyar Agaram Thelliyar Agaram (Tamil Nadu)
- Coordinates: 13.039200°N 80.146500°E
- Country: India
- State: Tamil Nadu
- District: Kanchipuram
- Taluk: Kundrathur

Government
  - Type: Mangadu Municipality
  - Body: Mangadu Municipality

Languages
  - Official: Tamil
- Time zone: UTC+5:30 (IST)

Thelliyar Agaram or Thelliyaragaram is a revenue village in the Kundrathur taluk of Kancheepuram district, India and a suburb of Chennai city. Thelliyar Agaram stretches along the northern banks of the Porur Lake from Karambakkam in the east to Iyyappanthangal in the west and administratively forms part of the Mangadu municipality of Kanchipuram district. It is a part of the Chennai metropolitan area and situated about 20 kilometres (12 miles) from the Chennai Central railway station.

The Sri Ramachandra Institute of Higher Education and Research was established in Thelliyar Agaram in 1985 and Dr. M. S. Swaminathan Wetland Eco Park in 2025. While in use for administrative purposes, the name "Thelliyar Agaram" is not popular in common usage. Thelliyar Agaram is served by the Thelliyaragaram metro station and the Sri Ramachandra Institute of Higher Education and Research bus stop at the college entrance is an important boarding point for commuters to Chennai city

== History ==
Thelliyar Agaram finds mention in a Madras government survey map from the 1860s. By 1971, predominantly rural Thelliyar Agaram was a part of the Madras urban agglomeration though for administrative reasons it was a part of the Sriperumbudur taluk of Chingleput district till 1997, when due to bifurcation of Chingleput district, it became a part of the Poonamallee taluk of Kanchipuram district. In 2018, Thelliyar Agaram became a part of the Mangadu municipality of Kundrathur taluk upon its formation.

== Demographics ==
Thelliyar Agaram has an area of 73.54 hectares and had a population of 752 in 1991 with 414 men and 338 women.Much of the suburb is sparsely populated as it is situated on the floodplains of the Porur Lake.
