= Telugu Ganga project =

Inter-state water supply project

Coordinates: 15°54′06″N 78°25′25″E

Telugu Ganga canal in Atmakur, Andhra Pradesh

Telugu Ganga project

The Telugu Ganga project is a joint water supply scheme implemented in India in 1980s by the then Andhra Pradesh chief minister Nandamuri Taraka Rama Rao and Tamil Nadu chief minister Maruthur Gopalan Ramachandran to provide drinking water to Chennai City in Tamil Nadu. It is also known as the Krishna Water Supply Project, since the source of the water is the Krishna River in erstwhile Andhra Pradesh. Water is drawn from the Srisailam reservoir and diverted towards Chennai through a series of interlinked canals, over a distance of about 406 kilometres (252 mi), before it reaches the destination at the Poondi reservoir near Chennai. The main checkpoints en route include the Somasila reservoir in Penna River valley, the Kandaleru reservoir, the 'Zero Point' near Uthukkottai where the water enters Tamil Nadu territory and finally, the Poondi reservoir, also known as Satyamurthy Sagar. From Poondi, water is distributed through a system of link canals to other storage reservoirs located at Red Hills, Sholavaram and Chembarambakkam.

The project was approved in 1977 after an agreement was reached between Tamil Nadu and the riparian states of Krishna River: Andhra Pradesh, Maharashtra and Karnataka. According to the agreement, each of the three riparian states were to contribute 5 billion cubic feet (140×10^{6} m^{3}) of water annually, for a total supply of 15 billion cubic feet (420×10^{6} m^{3}). This number was revised down to 12 billion cubic feet (340×10^{6} m^{3}) in 1983 after accounting for seepage and evaporation losses.

The water initially supplied by the canal was disappointing, delivering less than 500 million cubic feet (14×10^{6} m^{3}). In 2002, the religious leader Sathya Sai Baba announced a scheme of restoration and lining of the canal; a private undertaking. With an extensive rebuilding of the canal and several reservoirs, the project was completed in 2004, when the Poondi reservoir received Krishna water for the first time. The supply of water to Chennai city in 2006 was 3.7 billion cubic feet (100×10^{6} m^{3}). After the re-lining and reconstruction, the Kandaleru-Poondi part of the canal was renamed Sai Ganga.

== Jerdon's Courser ==
The area has however continued to be threatened by illegal construction work and activity related to a project proposed to link the rivers of India.
