= Vilinjiyambakkam Lake =

Reservoir in Tamil Nadu, India

- Location within Chennai
- Location: Avadi, Chennai, Tamil Nadu, India
- Coordinates: 13°06′55″N 80°05′10″E
- Type: Reservoir
- Basin countries: India
- Settlements: Chennai

Vilinjiyambakkam Lake, or Vilinjiyambakkam Aeri, is a rain-fed reservoir in Avadi, Chennai, India, that is filled during the monsoon seasons.

The lake is spread over an area of 37 acres. Dry during summers, the lake has been used for dumping sewage and garbage in recent years.

== See also ==
- Water management in Chennai
