= Ponneri railway station =

Railway station in Tamil Nadu, India

Ponneri
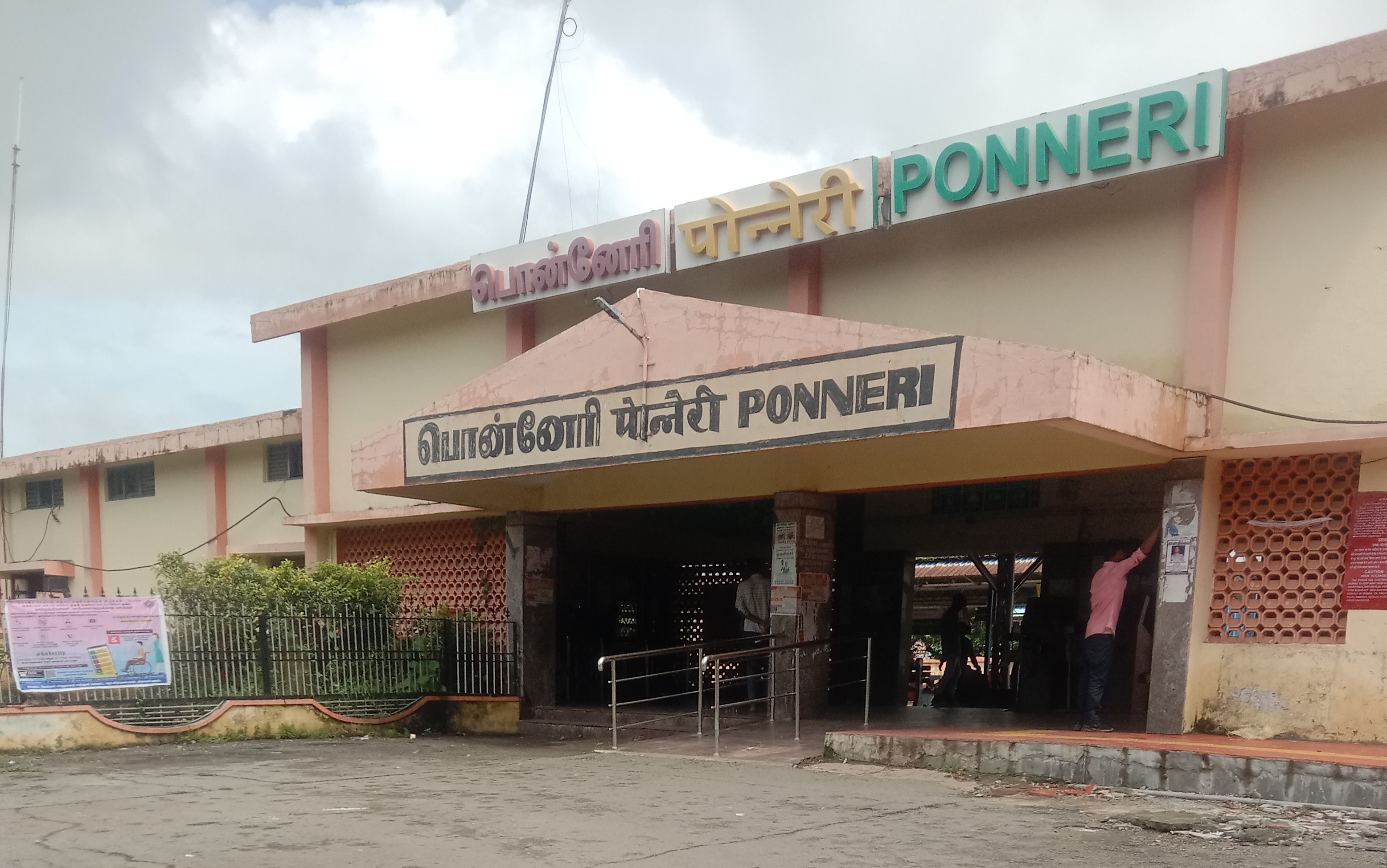
- This Is a Ponneri Railway Station Main Entrance in Ponneri, Tamil Nadu, India.

General information
- Location: Ponneri, Chennai, Tamil Nadu, India
- Coordinates: 13°19′57″N 80°11′56″E
- System: Indian Railways and Chennai Suburban Railway station
- Owner: Ministry of Railways, Indian Railways
- Line: North line of Chennai Suburban Railway
- Platforms: 4 platforms
- Tracks: 5 Railway tracks

Construction
- Structure type: Standard on-ground station
- Parking: Available at reasonable cost

Other information
- Station code: PON
- Fare zone: Southern Railways

History
- Electrified: 13 April 1979
- Former names: South Indian Railway
Location
- Location within India Location within Tamil Nadu

Ponneri railway station is one of the railway stations of the Chennai Central–Gummidipoondi section of the Chennai Suburban Railway Network. It serves the neighbourhood of Ponneri, a suburb of Chennai, and is located 34 km north of Chennai Central railway station. It has an elevation of 15 m above sea level.

== History ==
The lines at the station were electrified on 13 April 1979, with the electrification of the Chennai Central–Gummidipoondi section.

== See also ==
- Chennai Suburban Railway
