= Kosasthalaiyar River =

River in Chennai, India

Coordinates: 13.212822°N 80.27696°E

Kosasthalaiyar River (Tamil: கொற்றலை ஆறு kotṟalai āṟu, anglicised as Cortelliar) is one of the three rivers that flow in the Chennai metropolitan area, the other two being the Cooum and the Adyar.

== The river and its course ==
Kosasthalaiyar is 136-kilometre (85 mi) long and originates near Pallipattu in Thiruvallur district and drains into the Bay of Bengal. Its northern tributary Nagari river originates in Chitoor district of Andhra Pradesh and joins the main river in the backwaters of Poondi reservoir. Its catchment area covers Vellore, Chitoor, North Arcot, Thiruvallur and Chennai districts. It has a catchment area in North Arcot District where it branches near Kesavaram Anicut and this tributary flows to the Chennai city as Cooum River, while the main river flows to the Poondi reservoir. From Poondi reservoir, the river flows through Thiruvallur District, enters the Chennai metropolitan area, and joins the sea at Ennore Creek. The river has 9 check dams. There are two check dams across the river at Tamaraipakkam and Vallur. The excess discharge in the river is controlled by the Tamarapakkam Anicut located across the river in the downstream of Poondi reservoir. Vallur Anicut is a small check dam constructed near Minjur across the river to control water levels and feed irrigation channels in the area. It flows to a distance of 16 kilometres (10 mi) in the Chennai metropolitan area. The total catchment area of the river is 3,757 kilometres (2,334 mi), and the bed width ranges from 150 to 250 metres (490 to 820 ft). The discharge capacity of the river is 110,000 cubic metres per second (3,900,000 cu ft/s), and the anticipated flood discharge capacity is about 125,000 cubic metres per second (4,400,000 cu ft/s). The river drains up to 50,000 cubic feet per second (1,400 m^{3}/s) of flood water into the sea through the Ennore Creek during monsoons.

Galeru Nagari irrigation project is being executed to supply Krishna River water from Srisailam reservoir in Nagari basin of Chitoor district.

Every year, whenever the floodgates of Poondi reservoir are opened, a considerable volume of water gets drained into the sea through the Kosasthalaiyar River near the Ennore Creek.

Work on 10th check dam across the river is expected to by completed by the end of 2018 at a cost of ₹ 70 million. The structure would be 1.5 meters high, built across the 100-meter wide river. It would store water in the river for over 2 kilometers.

== Channels ==
The historic Korattur anicut located at Jamin Korattur in Tiruvallur district serves as a vital channel to regulating water to the Chembarambakkam reservoir. The dam was built in 1876 across the unpolluted stretch of the Cooum river and diverts excess water to the Chembarambakkam reservoir.

== Restoration ==
In 2011, the Water Resources Department (WRD) initiated the tendering process under the Irrigated Agriculture Modernisation and Waterbodies Restoration and Management (IAMWARM) project to rejuvenate nearly 200 lakes falling under Kosasthalaiyar river sub-basin. The department also proposes to construct groynes to reduce formation of sand bars near the mouth the river.

In May 2012, the Water Resources Department (WRD) planned to construct a check dam across the river near Bandikavanur village in Tiruvallur district, about 30 kilometres (19 mi) from Chennai, at a cost of ₹ 300 million. The Bandikavanur check dam, to be constructed about 500 metres (1,600 ft) upstream of the Karanodai bridge on Chennai–Kolkata National Highway, would be constructed at a height of 6.3 metres (21 ft) across the nearly 300-metre (980 ft) wide river. The check dam would recharge the water table at a radius of 10 kilometres (6 mi).

In 2018, two more check-dams were planned across the river. One of them will be located between Pudhukuppam and Kudiraipallam, downstream of Karanodai bridge. The dam will be built to a height of 1.2 meters across the river and the width will be nearly 335 meters, at a cost of ₹ 99 million. This will be the eighth check-dam built across the river. Another one will be built in Bandikavanur, about 30 km from Chennai. This will help recharge groundwater in a radius of 10 km.

== See also ==
- Cooum River
- Adyar River
- Water management in Chennai
