= Ponneri =

- Town
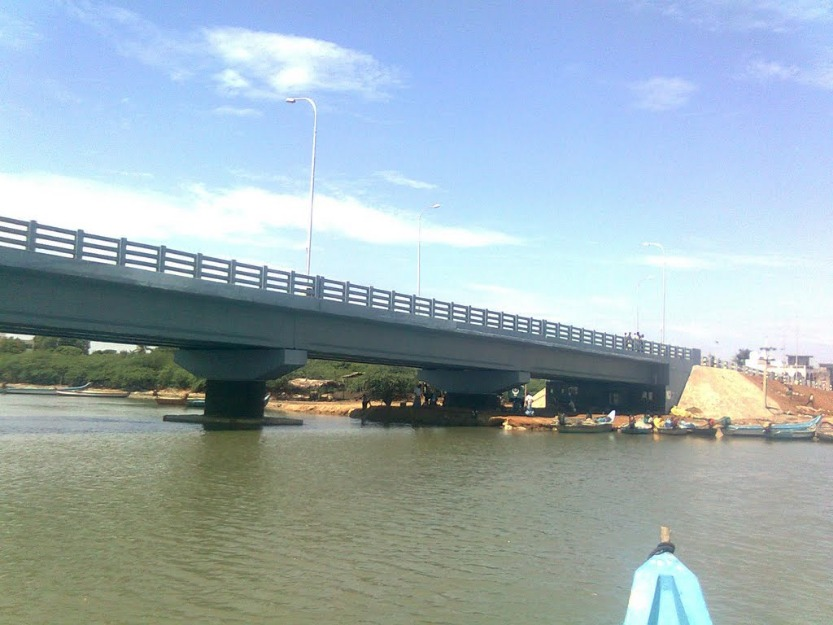
- Arani river passing under the bridge at Ponneri

- Location in Tamil Nadu, India
- Coordinates: 13.32°N 80.2°E
- Country: India
- State: Tamil Nadu
- District: Thiruvallur
- Metropolitan area: Chennai

Government
  - Type: MEMBER OF LEGISLATIVE ASSEMBLY - MLA
  - Body: Ponneri Assembly constituency

Area
  - Total: 15.315 km^{2} (5.913 sq mi)
- Elevation: 10 m (33 ft)

Population (2011)
  - Total: 41,643
  - Density: 2,719.1/km^{2} (7,042.4/sq mi)

Languages
  - Official: Tamil
- Time zone: UTC+5:30 (IST)
- PIN: 601204
- Telephone code: 044
- Vehicle registration: TN-18
- Sex ratio: 970/1000 ♂/♀

Ponneri is a town located in Chennai Metropolitan Area, Thiruvallur district in the Indian state of Tamil Nadu. It is located in Ponneri taluk. It is a part of the area Chennai Metropolitan Development Authority (CMDA) and a vital locality in Chennai Metropolitan Area. Ponneri is a major destination for the Andhra Pradesh people to buy goods.

== Geography ==
Ponneri is located at 13.32°N 80.2°E. It has an average elevation of 16 metres (52 feet).

== Demographics ==
As of 2001 India census, Ponneri had a population of 24,205. Males constituted 50% of the population and females 50% and including the Minjur population, that has postal code 601204, its considered it could reach around 50,000 as Ponneri state offices governs most of state implementations on all blocks under Ponneri taluk.

Neighbouring towns are Minjur, Redhills, Gummidipoondi and Athipattu with development underway on the NCTPS power plant project. Ponneri is on the banks of the Arani river. Ponneri is located 33 km north of Chennai and 52 km Northwest of Thiruvallur.

Ponneri has an average literacy rate of 73%, higher than the national average of 59.5%. Approximately 81% of males and 66% of females are literate. About 10% of the population is under 6 years of age.

== Politics ==
Ponneri assembly constituency (SC) is part of Thiruvallur (Lok Sabha constituency).

== Transport ==
The neighbourhood is served by the Ponneri railway station of the Chennai Suburban Railway Network.

=== Outer Ring Road ===
A 62.3 km long road connecting NH 32 / GST road at Vandalur, NH 48 (GWT Road) at Nazarethpettai, NH 716 (CTH Road) at Nemilichery to NH 16 (GNT Road) at Nallur and to TPP road at Minjur. It was developed in two phases by the CMA: Phase 1 (29.5 km) has been open to the public since 29 August 2014. The expected completion of the 2nd Phase (33.1 km) is December 2018. Ongoing outer ring road (expected completion by December 2018) is passing at a distance of 9 km (from Ponneri) near Minjur.

=== Chennai Peripheral Ring Road (CPRR) ===
A 162 km long (divided into five sections, 100m wide, six lane carriage way and two service lanes) road connects Pooncheri with Kattupalli in Tiruvallur district. Estimated cost of ₹12,500 crore with INR 3216 Cr funding from the Japan International Cooperation Agency (JICA). This project is also divided into two phases, the first of which consists in a 25-km stretch from Kattupalli Port to Thachur with a 3-km link road to the Chennai Outer Ring Road at Neithavoyal. It is expected to begin in 2020.

=== Grand North Trunk Road (GNT Road) ===
The Grand Trunk Road is also a national highway in India. It's one of the oldest routes in the country and runs through Howrah to Pakistan. The road was built by SherShahSuri in the 16th century. It was crucial for inland trade and connected India to Central Asia.

It starts from Madhavaram (Chennai) to Howrah to Pakistan. It is 10 km (measuring from Ponneri) near Thachur.

== Health ==
Ponneri has medical facilities, including government-run and private hospitals, private clinics and diagnostic centers. The government-aided hospitals also include a general hospital.
