= Sholavaram Aeri =

Sholavaram Lake
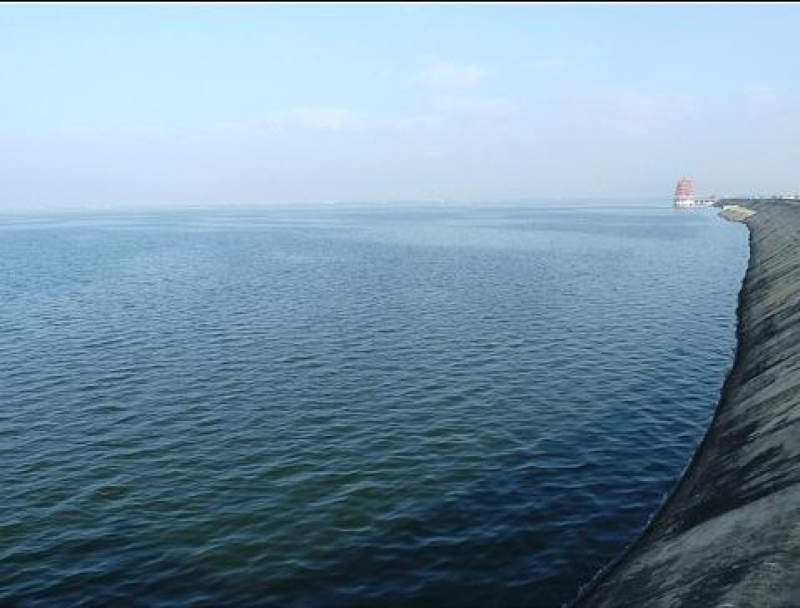

- Location within Tamil Nadu
- Location: Thiruvallur, Tamil Nadu, India
- Coordinates: 13.22757°N 80.15024°E
- Type: Reservoir
- Primary inflows: 423 (cusecs)
- Primary outflows: 400 (cusecs)
- Basin countries: India
- Water volume: 0.025 km^{3} (20,000 acre⋅ft)
- Settlements: Chennai

Sholavaram Aeri, or Sholavaram Lake, is located in Ponneri taluk of Thiruvallur district, Tamil Nadu, India. It is one of the rain-fed reservoirs from where water is drawn for supply Chennai city from this lake to Puzhal lake through canals.

== History ==
Sholavaram lake was built prior to 1877, during British rule. It is primarily known for its lake and motor racing. The lake is one of the main water sources for Chennai. The race track near Sholavaram lake used to be an air strip during World War II. Racing events were conducted from the early 1960s to the late 1980s. Racing events took place during February of every year. The track was T-shaped so the problem was discussed with rac in london and the Madras Motor club was advised that the width of the track should not be more than 35 feet. The 150 foot runway was divided by having an eighty-foot no-man's land in the centre, with 35 foot wide tracks on two sides. This gave a wide space in the centre and the ambulance, marshalls, etc. were all located in the centre 80 foot divide. Being a place that belonged to the army, the club could not say anything when someone in the army decided to test their new tanks and the Sholavaram runway was taken up by the army on several occasions to test tanks. So the Madras Motor Sports Club built a new track in Sriperumbadur, Chennai, Tamil Nadu, but this track still evokes strong memories and nostalgia from many drivers and spectators.

== Geography ==
Sholavaram is a quiet town, 24 km north of Chennai, Tamil Nadu. Sholavaram lake is one of the largest lakes in Chennai. It is located near Sholavaram Airstrip, which has a T-shaped base where the Indian army used to test their activities. The canal has been connected in between Sholavaram and Puzhal lake. Peoples in the surroundings use the canal road to reach Thiruvallur main road, Redhills junction and also G.N.T road or National highway (NH5).

== 1983: Krishna River Water supply scheme ==
An agreement was signed jointly by Governments of Maharashtra, Karnataka and Andhra Pradesh on 14 April 1976 to spare 15 thousand million cubic feet (TMC) of Krishna water to Chennai city. Following this, an accord between Andhra Pradesh Government and Tamil Nadu Government was signed on 18 April 1983 for drawing 15 TMC of Krishna water to Chennai City from Sri Sailam Reservoir to be conveyed through Somaseela and Kandaleru Reservoirs. Ultimately a net quantity of 12 TMC (after loss of 3 TMC en route in evaporation and seepage) will reach the Tamil Nadu border. Thus the water from Krishna river were stored in Sholavaram lake as well as Poondi Reservoir for drinking purposes.

== 2015: heavy rainfall ==
In November and December 2015, North East monsoon brought heavy rainfall to the coastal areas of Tamil Nadu and Andhra pradesh. The water inlet of Sholavaram lake reached the maximum capacity of 595 (mcft) out of 881 (mcft). A few years ago the water surplus place was extended up to 200 (mcft) and the bunds were also repaired. During the heavy rainfall flow in the Sholavaram lake and its surroundings, crack found in the lake region. On 16 November 2015, 400 metre of crack found in same region due to clay soil. Water Resources Department took action and the lake has been under controlled. On 1 December 2015, the lake had an inflow of 423 (cusecs) and an outflow of 400 (cusecs).

== Capacity augmentation ==
In April 2019, desilting work to restore the reservoir's capacity began at a cost of ₹54.2 million, which would enhance the lake's storage by about 250 million cubic feet (mcft).

== See also ==
- Puzhal lake
- Redhills, Chennai
- Poondi Reservoir
- Water management in Chennai
