= Puzhal =

- Neighbourhood
- Puzhal, Chennai district Puzhal (Tamil Nadu) Puzhal (India)
- Coordinates: 13°10′11″N 80°12′26″E
- Country: India
- State: Tamil Nadu
- District: Chennai district

Population (2001)
  - Total: 20,297

Languages
  - Official: Tamil
- Time zone: UTC+5:30 (IST)
- Postal code: 600066
- Vehicle registration: TN-18

Puzhal or Pulhal is a Northwestern residential town in Thiruvallur district in the Indian state of Tamil Nadu. Puzhal is located on the banks of Puzhal Lake. The town is known for Puzhal Central Prison.

The area is one of the 163 notified areas (megalithic sites) in the state of Tamil Nadu.

== History ==
In ancient times, the region was ruled by a chief of the Kurumbars variously titled as Kamunda Kurumba Prabhu( Pulhal Raja) who is also credited with building a royal fort at this site. The fort and the land was later overran by the Chola sovereign from Thanjavur.

== Geography ==
=== Puzhal Lake ===
Puzhal aeri, or Puzhal lake, also known as the Red Hills Lake, is located in Ponneri Taluk of Thiruvallur district, Tamil Nadu, India. It is one of the two rain-fed reservoirs from where water is drawn for supply to Chennai City, the other one being the Chembarambakkam Lake / Porur Lake.

== Demographics ==
As of 2001 India census, Pullhal had a population of 20,297. Males constitute 49% of the population and females 51%. Pullhal has an average literacy rate of 76%, higher than the national average of 59.5%; male literacy is 84%, and female literacy is 68%. In Pullhal, 14% of the population is under 6 years of age. Pullhal is now in Chennai District. Major to supply water to Chennai people.

== Puzhal Camp or Srilankan Refugee camp ==
Puzhal camp is one of the Sri Lankan refugee camps out of 115 camps were found in Tamil Nadu. According to Indian census Thiruvallur districts has second highest Sri Lankan refugee population. It has 1,646 households with a total of 5,387 refugees. Particularly Pullhal camp has second highest refugee population in Thiruvallur district. It accounts for 408 households with a refugee population of 1,283. That is why Puzhal Town is also expressed as Camp.

== Amenities ==
- Urban community health center

=== Puzhal Central Prison ===
Puzhal Central Prison is located in the neighbourhood. The prison began operation in 2006, replacing the erstwhile Chennai Central Prison.

The plan for the construction of Puzhal Central Prison was conceived during the early 2000s. Sites in Puzhal and in Maraimalai Nagar were initially considered and the final decision to construct in Puzhal was made due to the availability of large piece of Government owned land. It was constructed by Tamil Nadu Police Housing Corporation (TNPHC) for a cost of ₹ 1,770 million in less than 3 years. It was inaugurated by then chief minister of Tamil Nadu, M. Karunanidhi, on 26 November 2006.

== Education ==
- Jain Vidyaashram
- Velammal Global School
- Narayana E-tech
- Dr. Sivanthi Aditanar Matriculation Higher Secondary School
- Greenfield International School
