= Thachur =

- Village
- Location in Tamil Nadu, India
- Coordinates: 11.75291°N 78.96801°E
- Country: India
- State: Tamil Nadu
- District: kallakurichi

Population (2001)
  - Total: 3,765

Languages
  - Official: Tamil
- Time zone: UTC+5:30 (IST)
- PIN: 606 213
- Telephone code: 04151
- Vehicle registration: 15

Thachur is a village in Kallakurichi district in the state of Tamil Nadu, India. It is a Grama Panchayat consisting of few villages.

== Demographics ==
As of 2001 India census, Thachur had a population of 3675. Males and females each constitute 50% of the population. Thachur has an average literacy rate of 54%, higher than the national average of 39.5%: male literacy is 51% and female literacy is 49%. In Thachur, 11% of the population is under 6 years of age. Kallakurichi is the Taluk headquarters of this village.
