= Poondi Reservoir =

Reservoir in Tamil Nadu, India

- Sathyamoorthy Reservoir
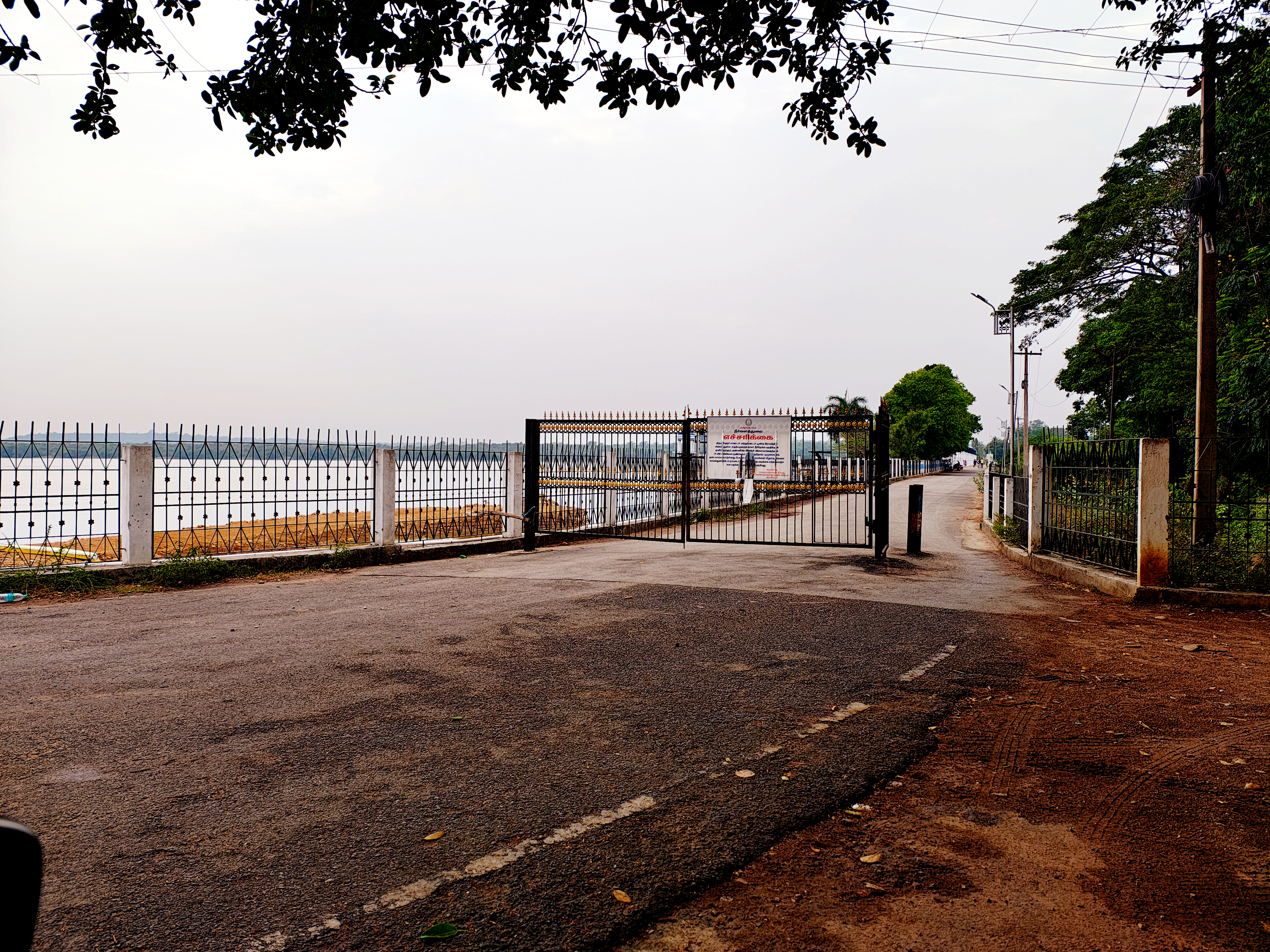
- Entrance to Poondi Reservoir

- Location within Tamil Nadu Location within India
- Location: Thiruvallur District, Tamil Nadu, India
- Coordinates: 13°11′6″N 79°51′36″E
- Type: Reservoir
- Etymology: Chennai Mayor S. Satyamurti
- Primary inflows: 34887 cusecs
- Primary outflows: 36484 cusecs
- Basin countries: India
- Built: 1944
- Water volume: 3,231 million cubic feet (91.5×10^{6} m^{3}; 74,200 acre⋅ft)
- Settlements: Chennai, Tamil Nadu

Sathyamoorthy Saagar, also known as Poondy Reservoir, is the reservoir constructed across Kotralai (alias) Kosasthalai River in Tiruvallur district of Tamil Nadu state in India. It acts as the important drinking water source for Chennai Municipal Corporation which is located 60 km away from the lake.

== History ==
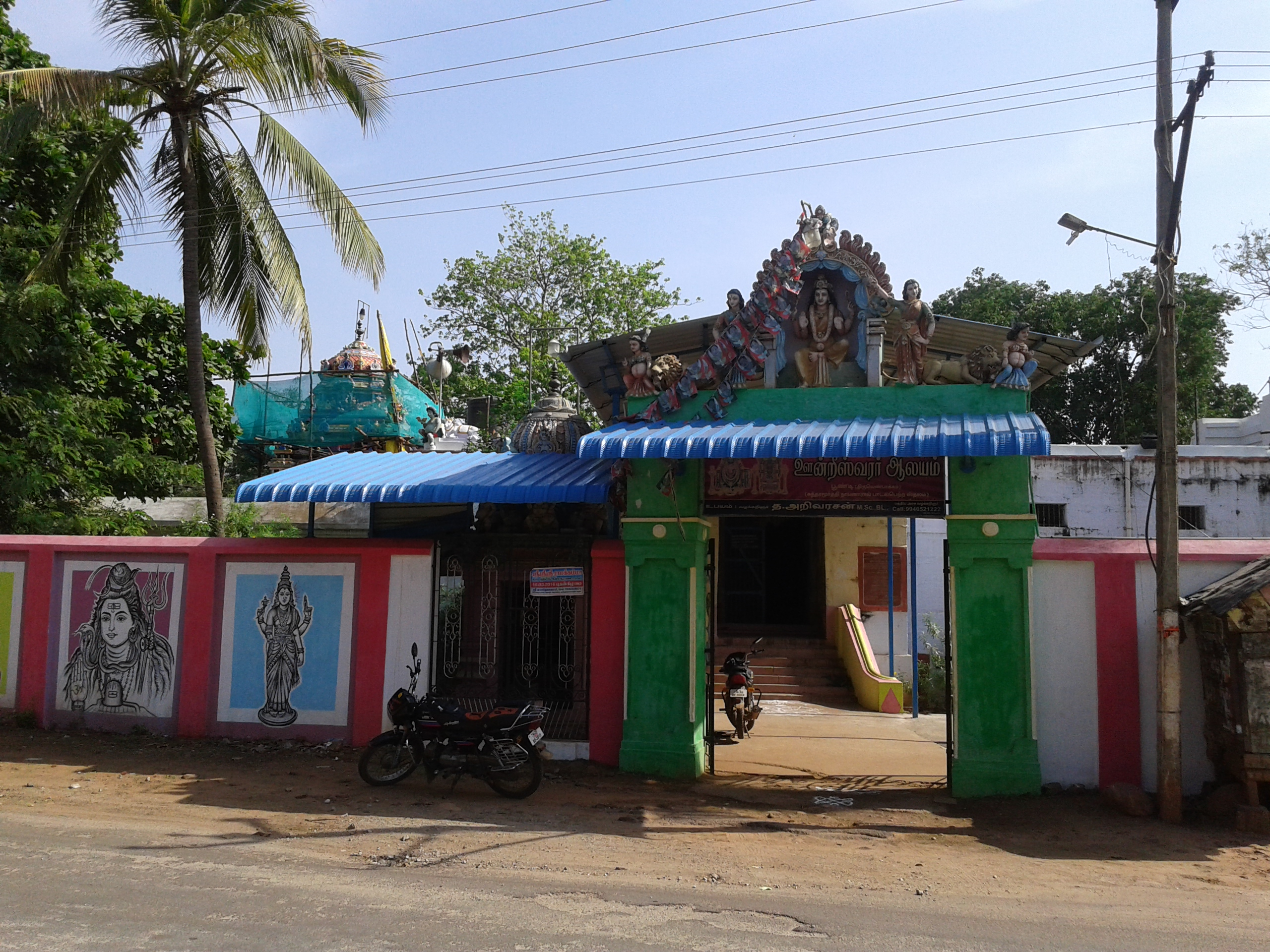
Oondreswarar temple was moved to ease the construction of the reservoir

Poondi Reservoir (later named as Sathyamoorthy Sagar) was constructed in 1944 across the Kosathalaiyar River or Kotralai River in Thiruvallur district with a capacity of 2573 Mcft and placed in service for intercepting and storing Kosathalaiyar River water. Surplus water flows down the river which is again intercepted by Tamaraipakkam Anicut and diverted to Sholavaram Lake and Puzhal lake. A lined canal known as Poondi Canal was later constructed in 1972 to convey water from Poondi Reservoir to Sholavaram Lake. This reservoir was constructed at the cost of ₹ 6.5 million. S. Satyamurti is remembered today as the political mentor of Kumaraswami Kamaraj, who was the Chief Minister of the State between 1954 and 1963. Because of his strong devotion to Satyamurti, Kamaraj got the Poondi reservoir named after Satyamurti.

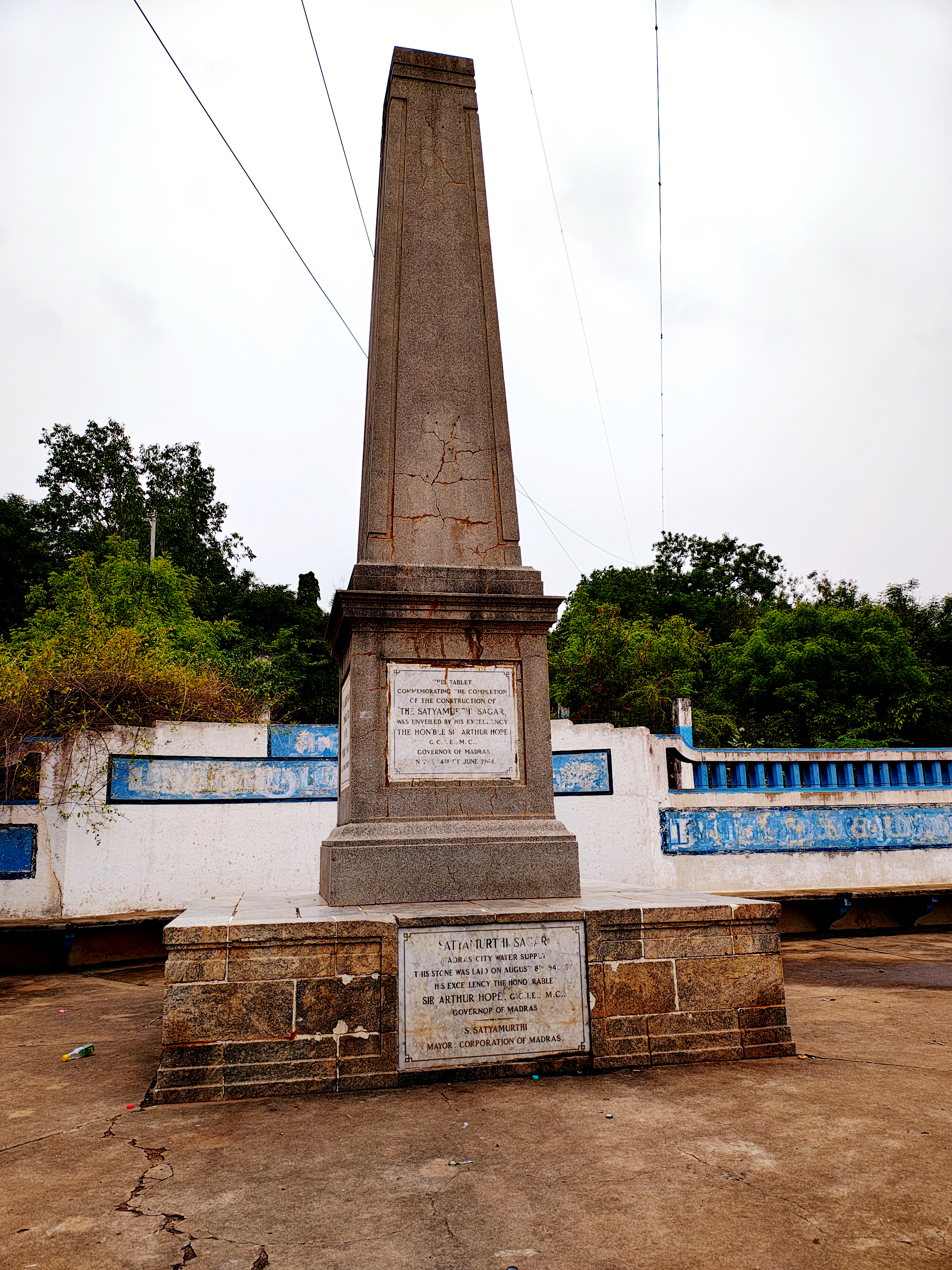
Poondi Sathyamoorthy Sagar Plaque

The original complex of Oondreswarar Temple is believed to have been built by Cholas, while the present masonry structure was built during the 16th century. The temple was moved to the current location in 1942 to ease the construction of the reservoir. The reservoir has a garden is a popular picnic spot in the region.

== 1972: Construction of lined channel ==
The construction of a lined channel from Poondi to Tamaraipakkam for a length of 15 km. to convey water from Poondi to Tamaraipakkam was completed in 1972 to reduce the transmission loss. The combined capacities of Sholavaram and Redhills lakes were increased by 700 Mcft by raising the lake bunds. Thus, the combined storage capacity of Poondi, Sholavaram and Redhills was increased to 6296 Mcft (Poondi: 2573 + Cholavaram: 881 + Redhills: 2842). The irrigation rights of Sholavaram lake and Redhills lake were acquired in 1962 and the entire storage was made available for the City supply.

== Telugu Ganga Project ==
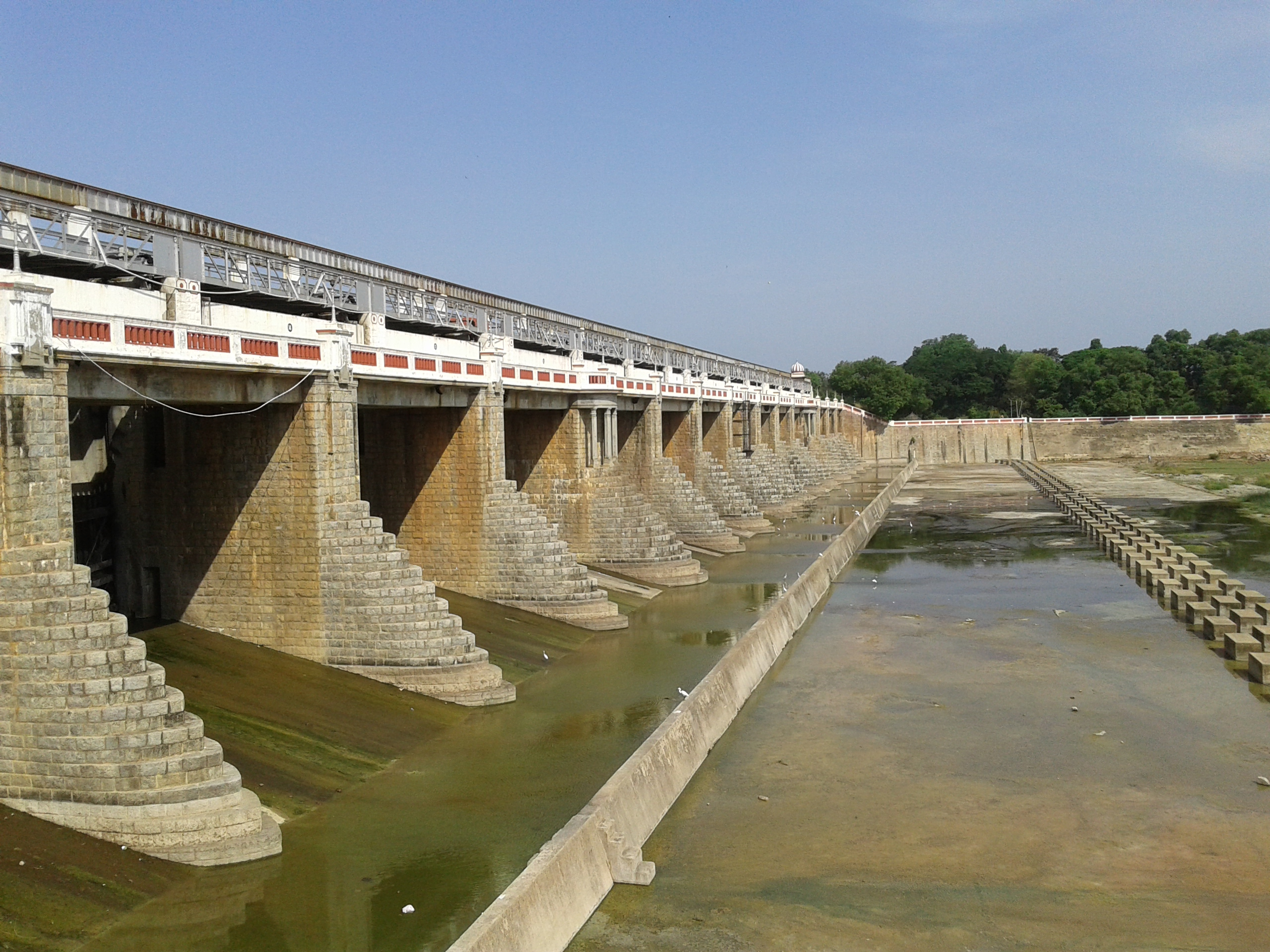
Plaque of Satyamoorthi reservoir

An agreement was signed jointly by Governments of Maharashtra, Karnataka and Andhra Pradesh on 14 April 1976 to spare 15 thousand million cubic feet (TMC) of Krishna water to Chennai city. Following this, an accord between Andhra Pradesh Government and Tamil Nadu Government was signed for Telugu Ganga project on 18 April 1983 for drawing 15 TMC of Krishna water to Chennai City from Sri Sailam Reservoir to be conveyed through Somaseela and Kandaleru Reservoirs and ultimately a net quantity of 12 TMC (after loss of 3 TMC en route in evaporation and seepage) will reach the Tamil Nadu border.

Initial works for supplying water under this scheme were completed in 1996 and from September 1996, water is received at Poondi Reservoir from Kandaleru Reservoir in Andhra Pradesh through 152 km. long open canal up to Tamil Nadu Border near Uthukottai. Then, the water is conveyed through 25 km. long open canal to Poondi Reservoir. From Poondi Reservoir, water is transferred to Redhills and Chembarambakkam Lakes through Link/Feeder canals and supplied to city after treatment. Key point to note is Somaseela reservoir reaches 22TMC in capacity and Kandaleru capacity exceeds 8TMC before water can flow in the lined canal to "zero point" i.e. Tamil Nadu border point..

== 2008-2009: Construction of pump houses ==
Nearly 35 million litres per day (MLD) of water, which was being wasted due to evaporation during transfer from Poondi to Red Hills, will soon be available to city residents, and 40,530 new water connections are likely to be given because of it. A water pumping house in Poondi, inaugurated on Wednesday by deputy chief minister M K Stalin, will make this possible.

The Chennai Metropolitan Water Supply and Sewerage Board (CMWSSB) supplies around 650 MLD of water everyday, and the Poondi reservoir is one of the major sources of water. Currently, water from Poondi is being carried by means of an open canal to Cholavaram and from there to Red Hills. Nearly 35 MLD of water is wasted due to evaporation. With CMWSSB transferring the water directly from the Poondi reservoir to Red Hills through a closed pipeline running to about 47 km, there will be no wastage of water. The pumping station was constructed to increase the force of water sent through the canal. A 45 km pipeline was installed five years ago and we added two kilometres extra under the Jawaharlal Nehru National Urban Renewal Mission (JNNURM). Now, the water will directly reach the Red Hills treatment plant and there will be no wastage.

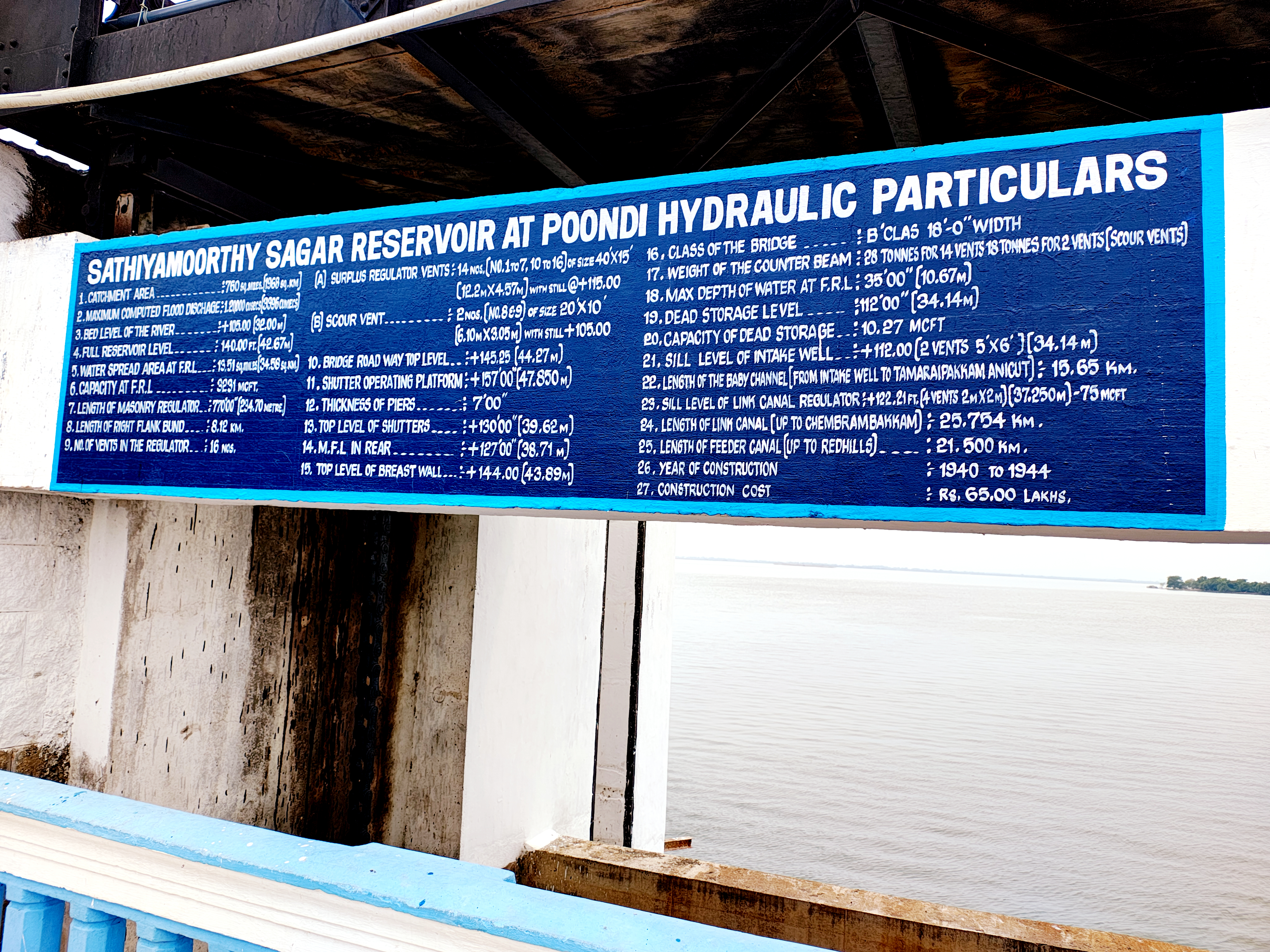
Sathyamoorthy Sagar Reservoir Information

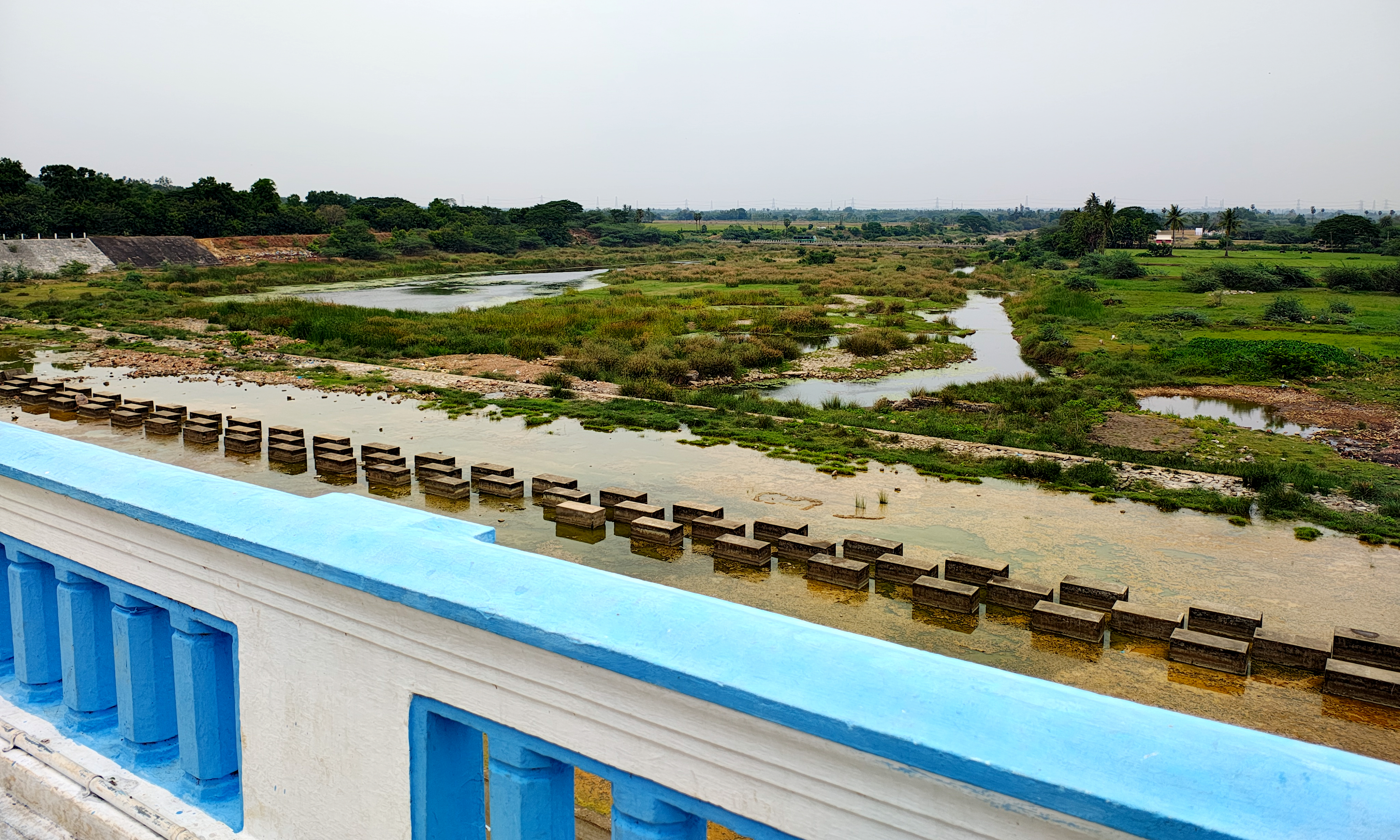
Sathyamoorthy Sagar View of Kosasthalaiyar

== 2015: Heavy rainfall in the month of November and December ==
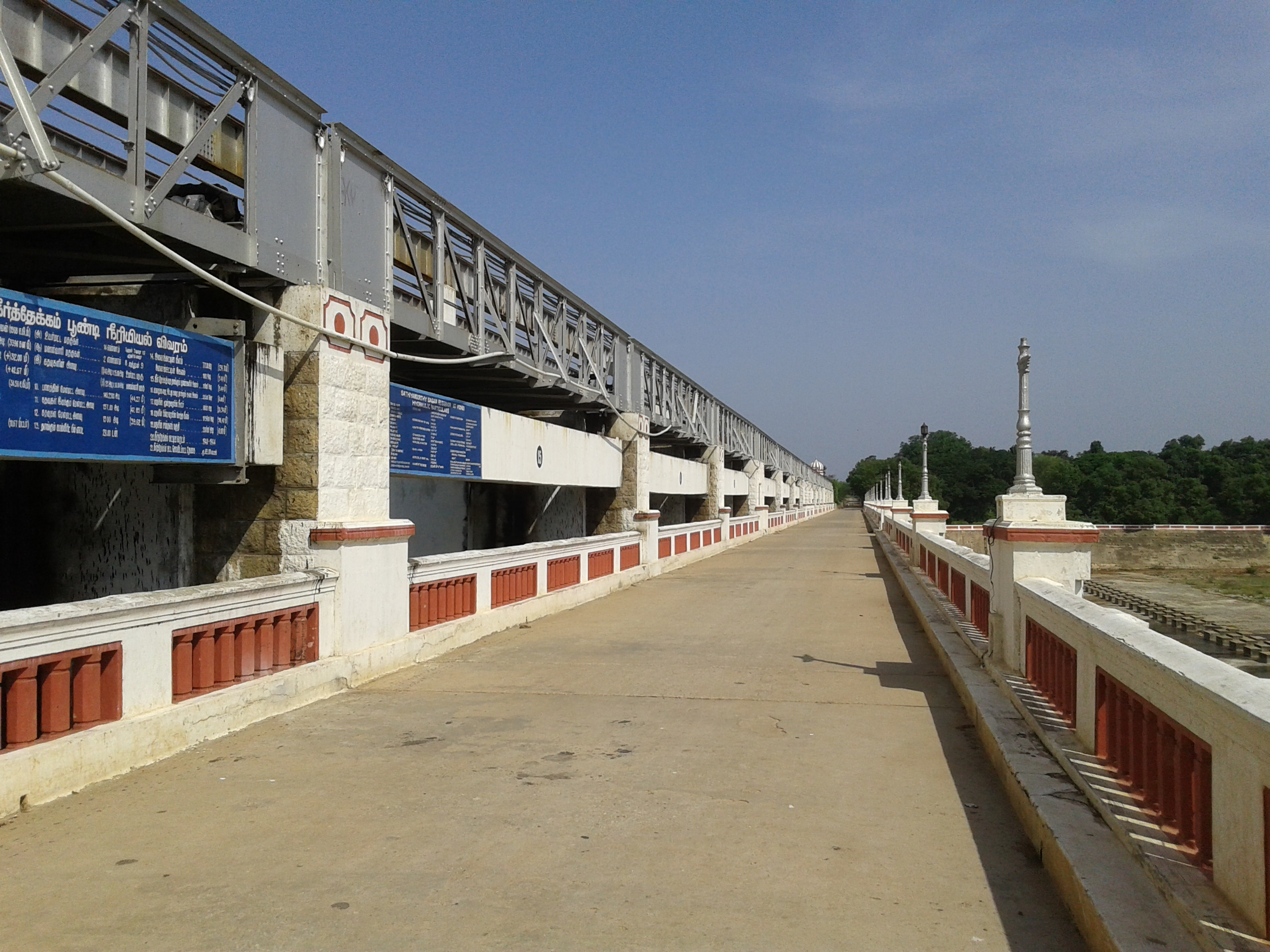
Plaque of Satyamoorthi reservoir

The northeast monsoon brought heavy rainfall from Deepavalli causing the huge flow of water in Poondi Reservoir and from its surroundings. On 16 November 2015 the Poondi reservoirs, bone-dry until a fortnight ago, were filled to the brim, which led to consternation among residents of localities nearby areas. Huge inflows are recorded in Poondi reservoir. Chennai Metro Water said that Poondi is getting an inflow of over 6,000 cusecs of water from Kosasthalaiyar river on 17 November 2015. On 1 December 2015 the northeast monsoon brought heavy rainfall of 40 mm and causing the inflow of 34,887 (cusecs) and outflow of 36,484 (cusecs), which was the highest inflow and outflow of water ever seen before on 3 December 2015.

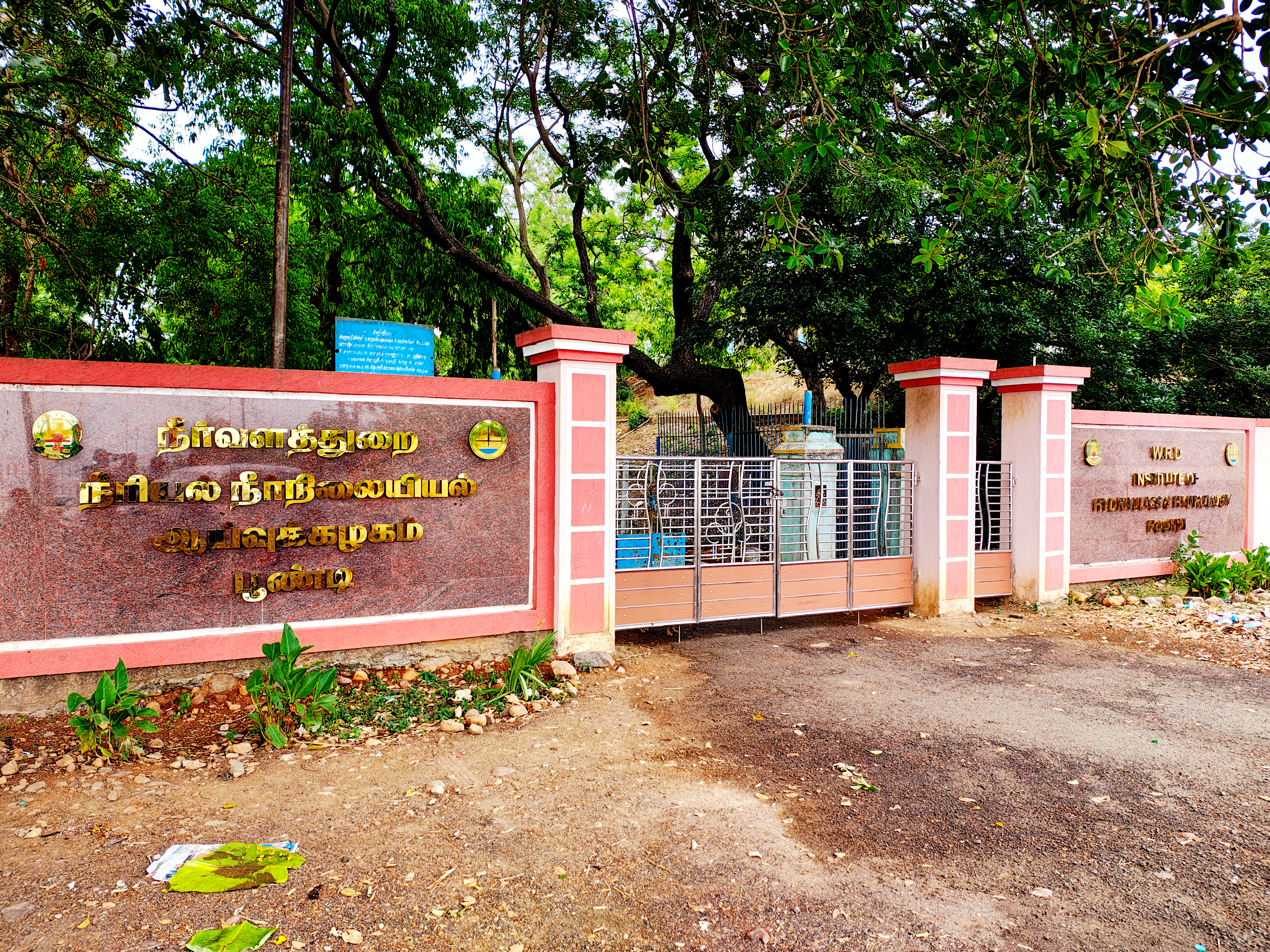
Poondi Hydrology Institute

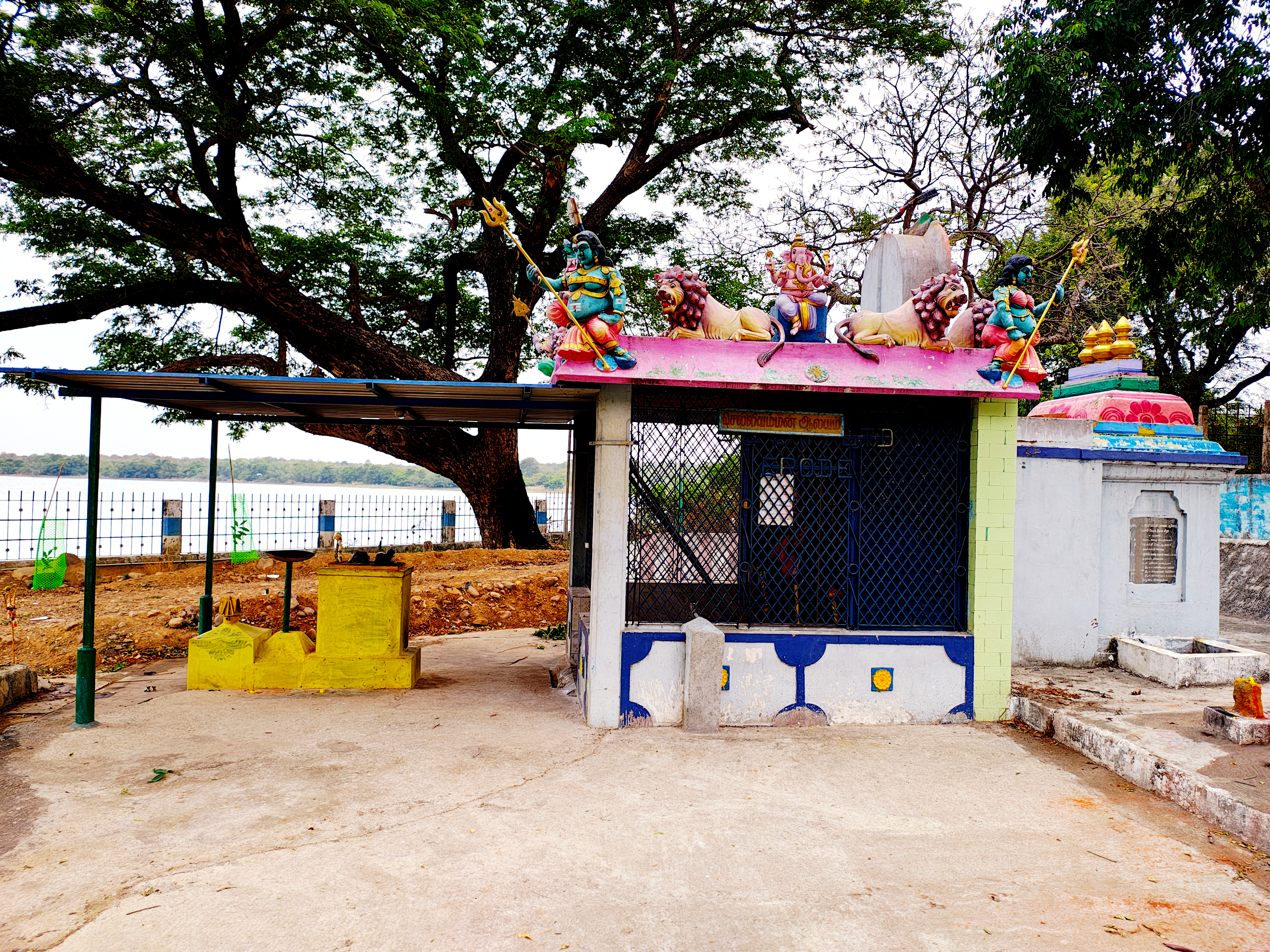
Selliamman Temple, Poondi

== See more ==
- Sholavaram lake
- Puzhal lake
- Krishna River
- Chembarambakkam lake
