= Athivakkam =

Village in Tiruvallur, Tamil Nadu, India

Coordinates: 13°16′14″N 80°03′53″E

Athivakkam is a village located in the Indian state of Tamil Nadu.
