= Porur Lake =

Lake in south-west Chennai, India

- போரூர் ஏரி (Tamil)
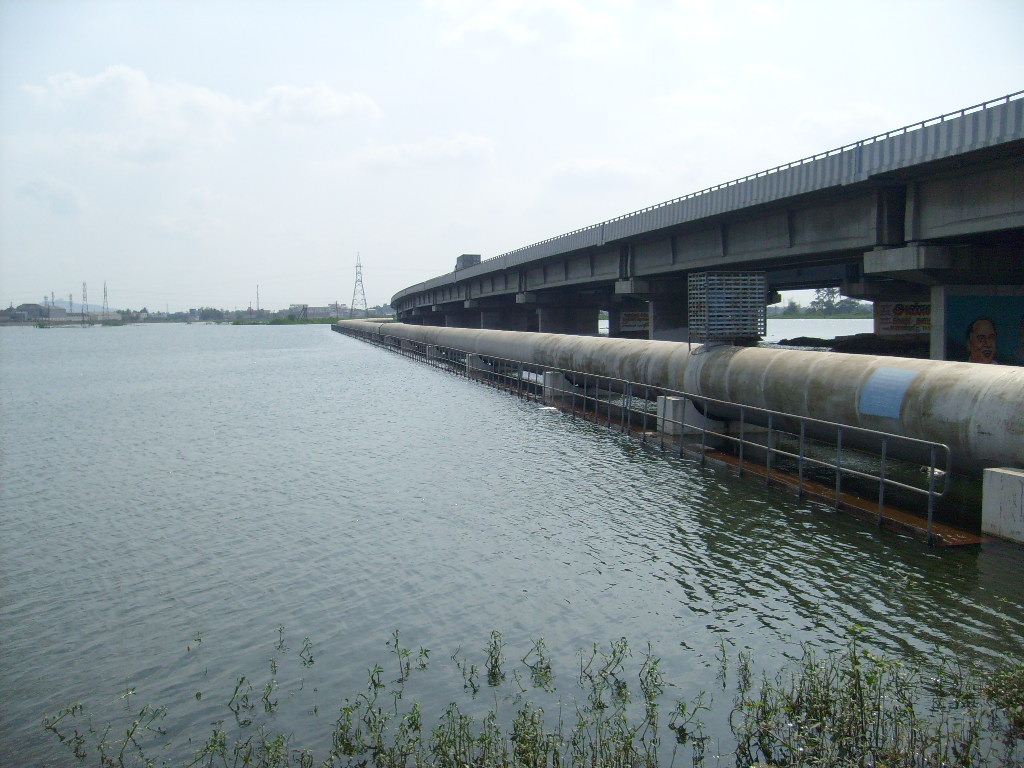
- Porur lake with the Chennai Bypass bridge in the background

- Location within Chennai
- Location: Chennai, Tamil Nadu
- Coordinates: 13.034223°N 80.15065°E
- Basin countries: India
- Surface area: 200 acres (81 ha)
- Water volume: 46,000,000 cubic feet (1,300,000 m^{3})
- Settlements: Chennai

Porur Lake is located on the fringes of the Porur neighbourhood in south-west Chennai and is a primary water resource for the residents of Chennai. It is a temporary catchment area connected with Chembarambakkam Lake. It is spread over 200 acres with a capacity of 46 million cubic feet (mcft).

There are four filters working 24x7 to pump water to K. K. Nagar double tank distribution point. Bathing, washing and/or swimming has been prohibited in this lake since 1995. A better view of the lake can be appreciated from the Chennai bypass.

In 2012, the Water Resources Department initiated a project to increase the capacity of the tank along with two other lakes in the city at a cost of ₹ 130 crore. This would deepen the lake by at least 1 m and increases the capacity to 70 mcft.

== History ==
The lake was home to a large number of residential settlements prior to 2006, when the Government of Tamil Nadu ordered the demolition of these settlements as a part of its lake restoration initiative. The demolitions forced the eviction of about 10,700 families, some of whom were relocated to sites as far as Collector Nagar, located in the Tiruvallur District, and Nallur, located in the Kancheepuram District.

== Gallery ==
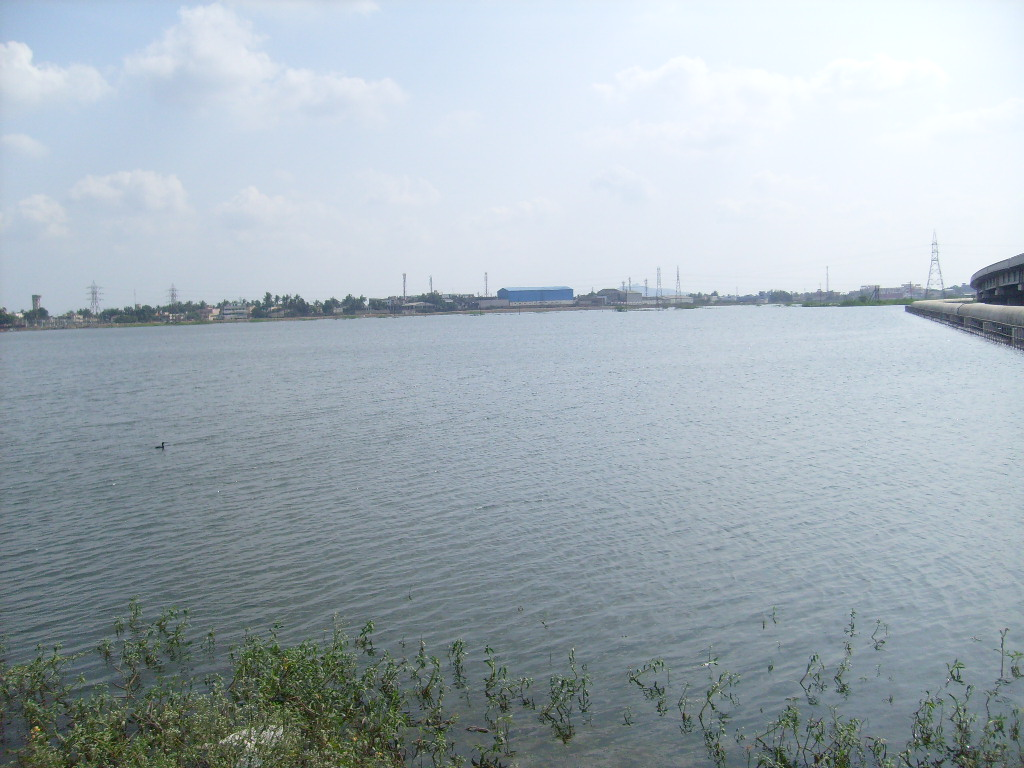

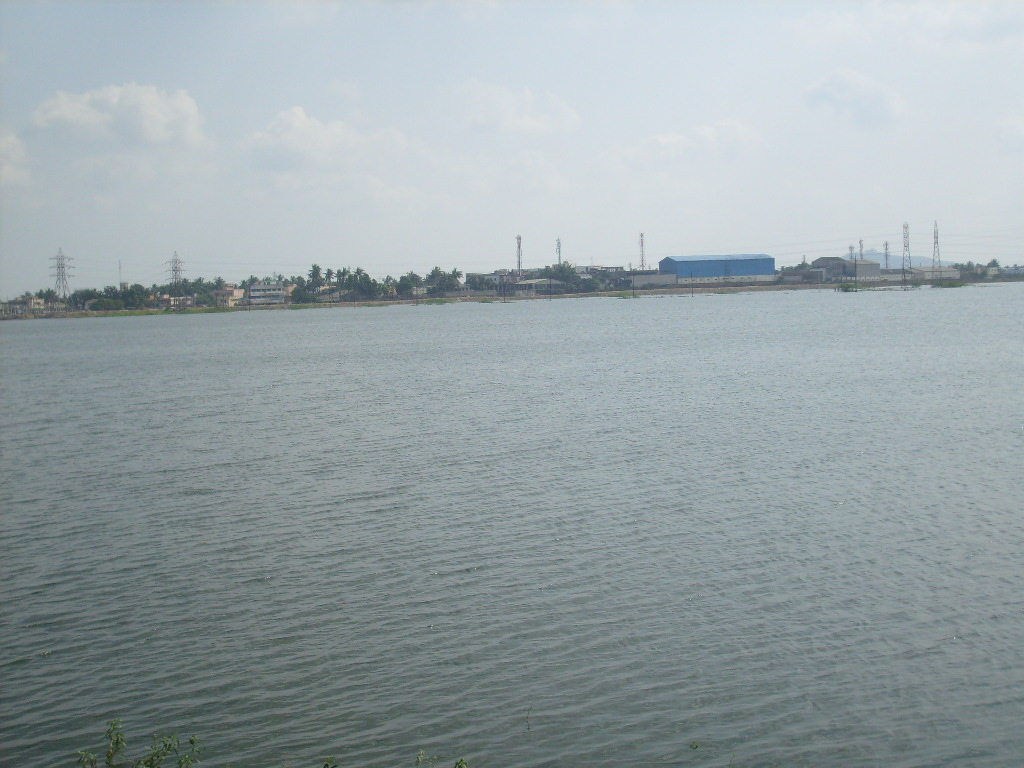

== See also ==
- Water management in Chennai
