= Sengundram =

Neighborhood in Chennai, India

Sengundram Red Hills
- Neighbourhood
- Nickname: "North Door Of Chennai"
- Red Hills (Chennai) Sengundram (Tamil Nadu) Sengundram (India)
- Coordinates: 13.186500°N 80.199900°E
- Country: India
- State: Tamil Nadu
- District: Tiruvallur
- Metro: Chennai
- Elevation: 33 m (108 ft)

Languages
  - Official: Tamil
- Time zone: UTC+5:30 (IST)
- PIN: 600052
- Telephone code: 044
- Vehicle registration: TN-18
- Planning agency: CMDA
- City: Chennai
- Tamil Nadu Assembly constituency: Madhavaram

Sengundram, known in English as Red Hills, is a suburb in the northwestern part of Chennai, Tamil Nadu, India in Thiruvallur District.

== History ==
The first railway proposals for India were made in Madras in 1832. The country's first transport train, Red Hill Railway (built by Arthur Cotton to transport granite for road-building), ran from Red Hills to the Chintadripet bridge in Madras in 1836–1837. A town named Sholavaram has an unused airstrip build by British for World War II. It was originally operated by the Royal Air Force as an airbase during World War II. After the war, it was abandoned until the airstrip was turned into a venue for drag racing. Most notably, the Malayalam actor Jayan was killed in a helicopter accident here during the shooting of his film Kolilakkam on 16 November 1980.

After the Madras Motor Sports Club was formed in mid-1950s, Sholavaram was selected to conduct its racing events. According to some estimates, entries across all the various categories of motorcycles and cars together numbered over 800. The state government would ply buses ferrying fans, who travelled from all over India, to and from the track. There was even a thriving black market for forged tickets. Participants included Vijay Mallya's Formula One Ensign or Chandhok's Formula 2 Chevron B42. Since then racing events took place every year and continued till late 1980s until the Madras Motor Sports Club built a new track at Irungattukottai, Sriperumbudur, Chennai.

The Indian Army later recovered the lands, which had been illegally occupied by local residents. The military used the area and the remaining airstrip as a surveillance base. There were also plans to use the airport as a secondary landing location for commercial aircraft.

In 2020 the airstrip was taken over by the Government of India, with plans to construct a new airport under the UDAN scheme.

== Diversity ==
Iyyappan temple in Red Hills is an important Hindu temple in the neighbourhood. The Church of South India church opposite the Iyyappan temple is one of the larger churches in the surrounding area, and the Aysha mosque is also near the temple. Vishalayam special needs school is the only special school at Red Hills. There are also two government schools, one for boys and one for girls, besides a government boys higher secondary school at Vadagarai.

== Red Hills Lake ==
Puzhal aeri, or Puzhal lake, also known as the Red Hills Lake, is located in Ponneri taluk of Tiruvallur district, Tamil Nadu. It is one of the two rain-fed reservoirs from where water is drawn for supply to Chennai City, the other one being the Chembarambakkam Lake and Porur Lake. The full capacity of the lake is 3,300 million ft^{3} (93 million m^{3}).

== Transport facility ==
A Red Hills bus stand has buses to various parts of Chennai. It is easy to get connected to CMBT, Broadway, Poonamalle, Avadi, Tiruninravur, Tambaram and Vandaloor Zoo through bus from Red Hills. Many mofussil buses also pass through Red Hills.

In Phase II of metro Rail, three lines covering a distance of 63 kilometres have been proposed in the second phase of the network. Line 4 is envisioned to be a 22-kilometre route with 8 stations from Moolakadai to Thirumangalam Junction. Stations are planned at: Moolakadai, Vinayagapuram/Teachers Colony, Surapet, Red Hills, Vadakarrai, Ambattur OT, Maduravoyil Junction, MMM Hospital and Thirumangalam Junction

== See also ==
- History of Chennai
