= Puzhal Lake =

Lake in Chennai, India

- Redhills Lake
- Location within Tamil Nadu
- Location: Red Hills, Chennai, Thiruvallur district, Tamil Nadu
- Coordinates: 13°10′00″N 80°10′17.5″E
- Type: Reservoir
- Primary inflows: 9607 (cusecs) Highest
- Primary outflows: 5470 (cusecs) Highest
- Basin countries: India
- Built: 1876
- Surface area: 4,500 acres (18 km^{2})
- Average depth: 50.20 feet (15.30 m)
- Water volume: 3,300 million cubic feet (93×10^{6} m^{3}; 76,000 acre⋅ft)
- Settlements: Chennai, Tamil Nadu

Puzhal Lake, or Puzhal Aeri, also known as the Red Hills Lake, is located in Red Hills, Chennai, India. It lies in Thiruvallur district of Tamil Nadu state. It is one of the two rain-fed reservoirs that supply water to Chennai City, the other one being the Chembarambakkam Lake and Porur Lake.

The full capacity of the lake is 3,300 million ft^{3} (3.3 Tmc ft or 93446 million litres).

== History ==
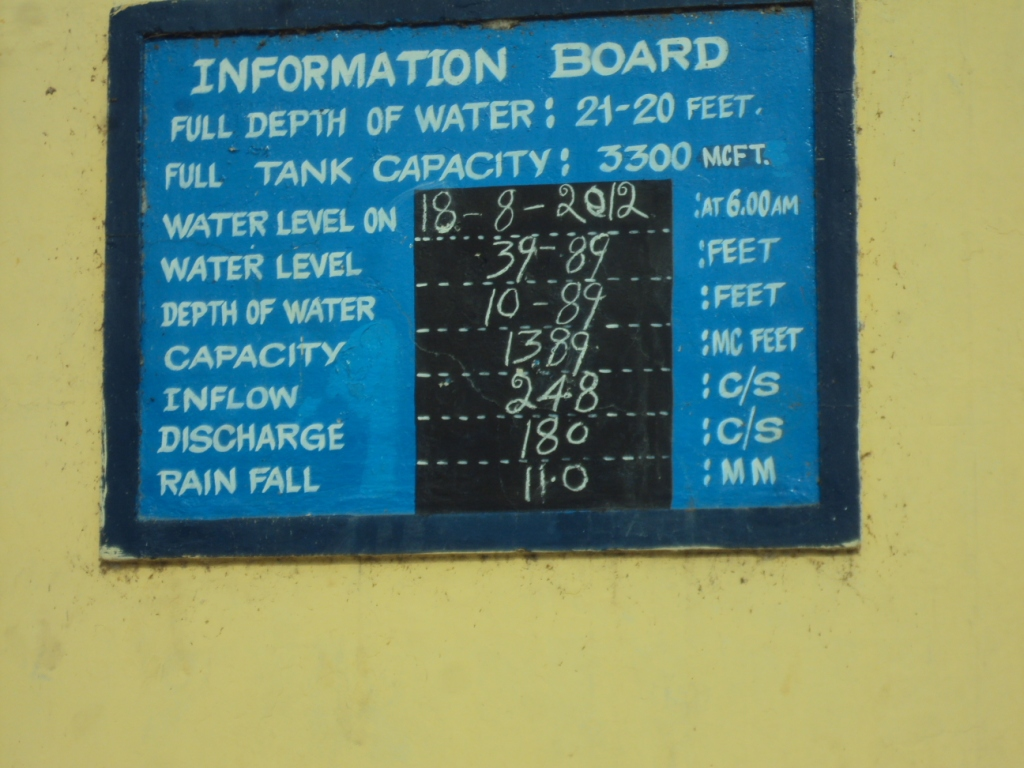
Board displaying Puzhal's capacity

The Puzhal reservoir was built in 1876 during the British rule in Puzhal,Chennai (named Madras at the time). The reservoir was originally a small tank with a capacity of 500 million cubic feet (mcft) and two masonry weirs, built using locally available laterite stones, then functioned as surplus weirs to release excess water from the water body. Today, these masonry weirs are water-retaining structures as they have been replaced by two shutters. In 1997, the storage capacity of the water reservoir was increased to 3,300 mcft and the depth to 21.20 ft to cater to the drinking water needs of Chennai and also to store Penna river water received from Andhra Pradesh through Poondi Reservoir and the Sholavaram Tank. Until 2012, the Water Resources Department (WRD) has only taken up maintenance work worth of ₹ 500,000 every year.

== Geography ==
There are two masonry weirs in the reservoir. One weir is 178 m long and the other is 220 m long and 15 ft deep. The bund measures 5 m and runs to a distance of 7 km. The weirs have turned porous over the years. The south west part of the reservoir has Avadi, Ambattur residential locality and has the main road to reach Avadi junction. Water treatment plant and Puzhal Central prison is located in the east part of the reservoir and has the highway road to reach CMBT and North Chennai. The North part has Padiyanallur village Thiruvallur koot road en route to reach Thiruvallur. There are two ways reservoir's bund road routes are located north east part of the reservoir, one bund route is from Alamaram junction to Redhills market junction and the other one bund road is from Redhills bypass road junction to Surapet junction. The North west part has Pammathukulam, Pothur, Attanthangal and Naravarikuppam villages.

== Jones Tower ==
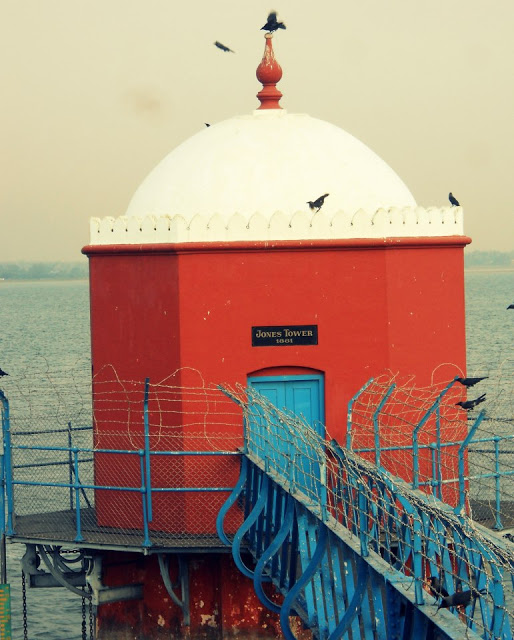
Jones Tower

Jones Tower was built in 1881 in Puzhal lake. It is used to measure the depth of the lake water level. The surrounding bund roads are used by many for exercises such as walking, running. High level Electric motors are used to inlet the water from the lake to the tank before the cleaning process. There are 11 Electric motor pumps located play an important role when the dry season is available for providing drinking water to the Chennai city.

== Water Seepage ==
During the heavy rainfall in November/December 2015 water seepage occurred on 19 November 2015 on the two places of Puzhal lake near the weirs due to heavy storage in the water reservoir .

== Upgradation ==
=== 2012 : Repairing process ===
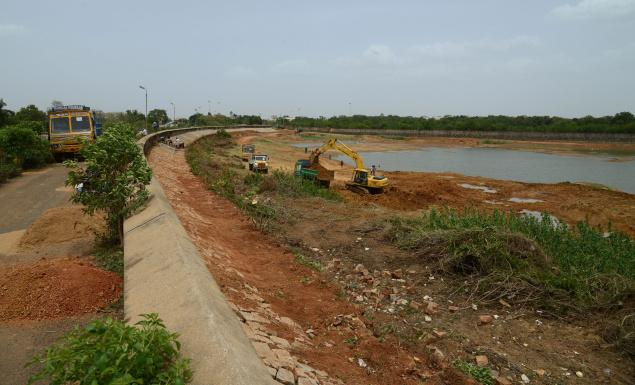
Repairing Puzhal bund roads in 2012

In June 2012, the WRD called for a tender for strengthening the reservoir at a cost of ₹ 101.6 million. Besides small repair to the shutters, filter arrangements on the slope of the bund will be made for 2 km. The road on top of the bund will also be widened by 1 m. The water level of the reservoir has been brought down to 10.46 ft to take up the project. The water body receives 300 cubic feet per second (cusecs) from Poondi canal to supply to the city.

=== 2015 : Heavy Rainfall November/December ===
According to Chennai metropolitan water supply and sewage board on 14 November 2015 rainfall in Puzhal reservoir has a storage of 2,228 million cubic feet as against its total capacity of 3,300 mcft and receiving an inflow of 1,196 cubic feet per second. Puzhal has lowest storage among the four reservoirs with 67.5 per cent of its capacity. On 1 December 2015 Puzhal also recorded 320mm, the highest volume of rainfall flowing overnight rain in the history. Discharge from the lake and maintain the water level two feet below the full level of 21.2 feet. Sand bags have also been placed in vulnerable areas along the surplus course such as Thandalkazhani, Vadakarai and Thiruneelakandan Nagar and Baba Nagar in Puzhal. People have also been warned of inundation. The surplus course of Red Hills travels for 15 km before joining the sea near Ennore creek. On 2 December 2015 Puzhal lake has recorded water inflow of 9607(cusecs) and outflow of 5470(cusecs), Which was the highest inflow and outflow of reservoir's history.

== Gallery ==
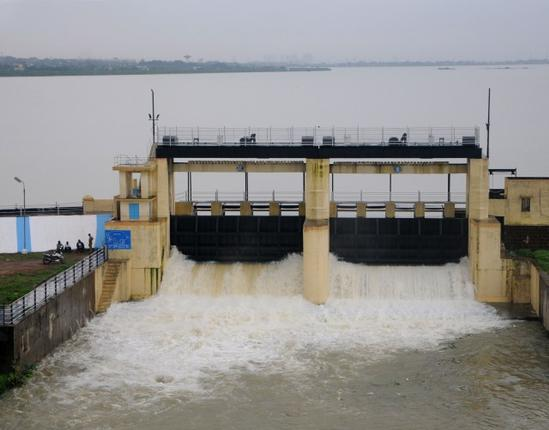
Two shutters has been opened when the lake has reached full capacity

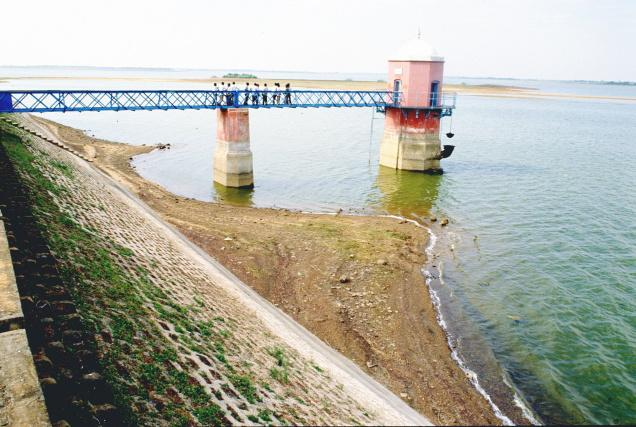
Puzhal lake has low water level due to the presence of dry season

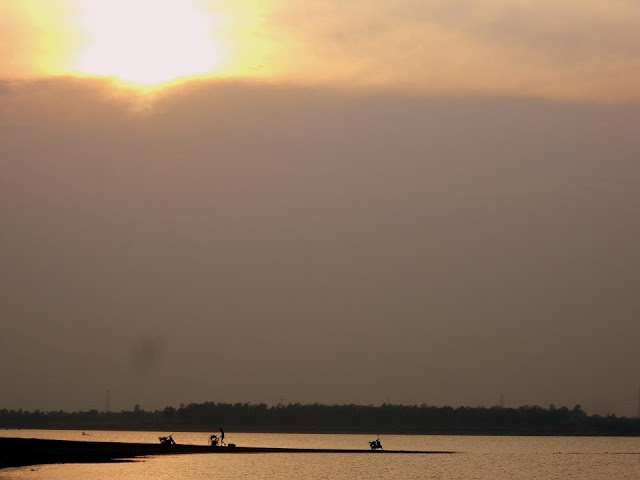
Split islands has been seen on the middle of the Puzhal lake

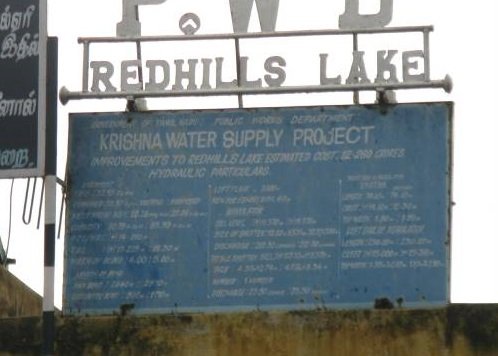
Puzhal Krishna river water project display in the outer portion of the lake

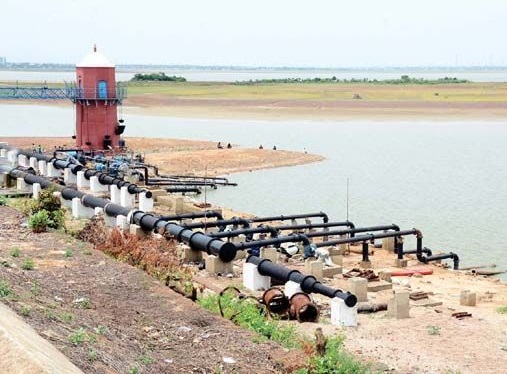
Electric motors are used to outlet the water in Puzhal lake.

== See also ==
- Chembarambakkam Lake
- Sholavaram tank
- Poondi Reservoir
- Water management in Chennai
