= Chembarambakkam Lake =

Lake in Kancheepuram District, India

- செம்பரம்பாக்கம் ஏரி (Tamil)
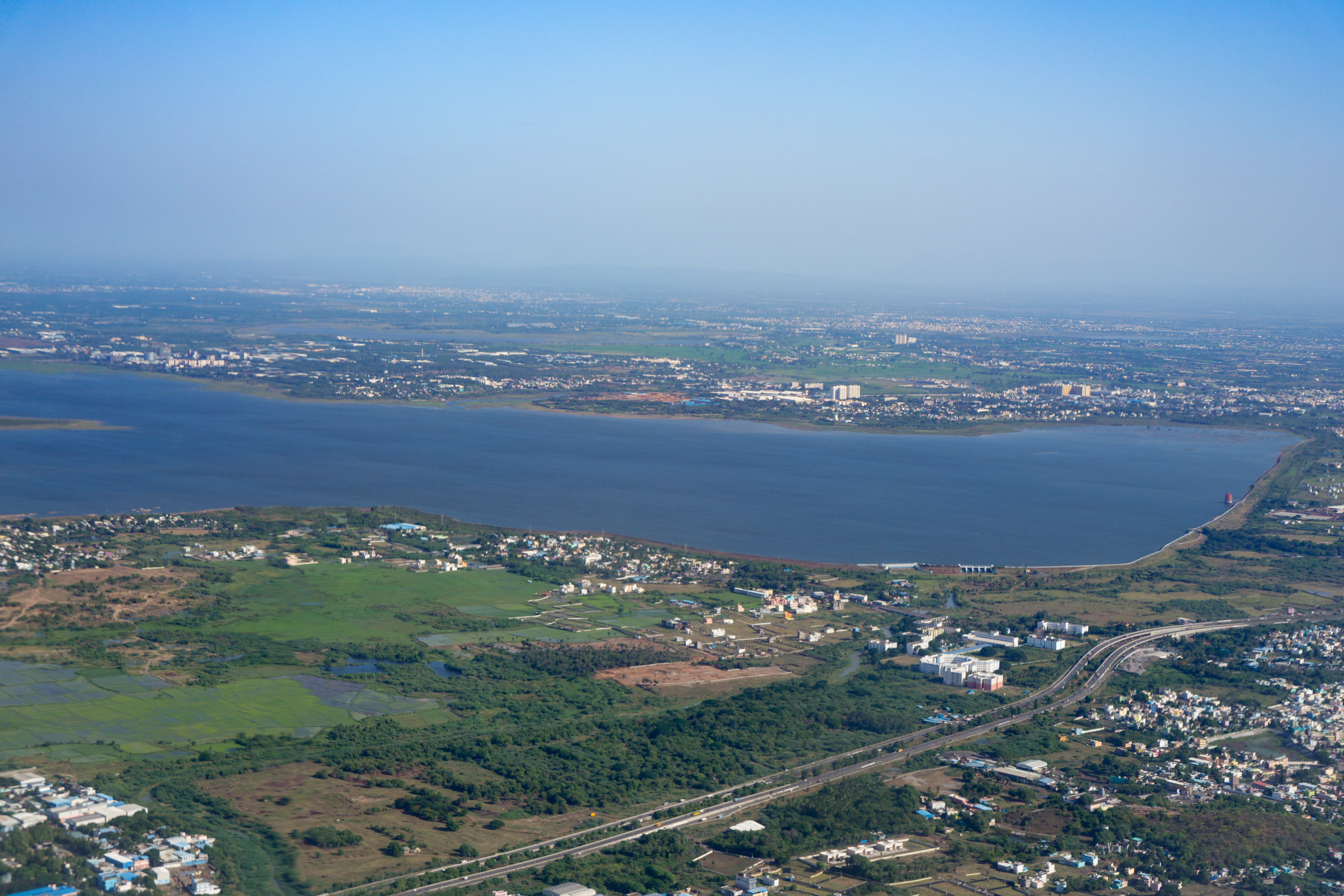
- Aerial view of the lake from the southeast

- Location within Tamil Nadu
- Location: Kancheepuram district, Tamil Nadu, South India
- Coordinates: 13.01158°N 80.06063°E
- Type: Reservoir
- Primary outflows: Adyar River
- Basin countries: India
- Surface area: 3,800 acres (15 km^{2})
- Settlements: Chennai

Chembarambakkam Lake is located in Kancheepuram district, Tamil Nadu, India, about 25 km (16 mi) from Chennai. It is the biggest of the two important rain-fed reservoirs, the other one being the Puzhal Lake, that supply drinking water to Chennai city . The Adyar River originates from this lake. A part of drinking water supply to Chennai metropolis is drawn from this lake. This was the first artificial lake built by Rajendra Chola I, the son of Rajaraja Chola, and Thiripuvana Madeviyar, prince of Kodumbalur.

During Chennai's water crisis of 2019, Chembarambakkam Lake dried up.

== The lake ==
Chembarambakkam lake was known as Puliyur Kottam. It is one of the 24 kottams (villages) that existed even during the later Chola period in Thondai Mandalam which had Kanchipuram as its headquarters. The lake was built by Rajendra Chola, the son of Rajaraja Chola.

The full tank level is 85.40 ft (26.03 m). The full capacity of the lake is 3,645 million cubic ft (3.64 Tmc ft)(103215 million liters).However, acute sedimentation has eroded more than 40% of its water holding capacity. There is an ancient Shiva temple and Kanni Koil located here.

== Pipelines ==
There are two pipelines existing from the lake's water treatment plant. The existing pipeline on Poonamallee Bypass Road has the capacity to convey only half of the 530 million litres that can be treated at the plant. In 2012, Chennai Metrowater started evaluating the feasibility of laying a third pipeline with a diameter of about 2,000 mm from the Chembarambakkam water treatment plant at a cost of ₹ 650 million, which will run parallel to the existing one for over 6.5 km.

== Gallery ==
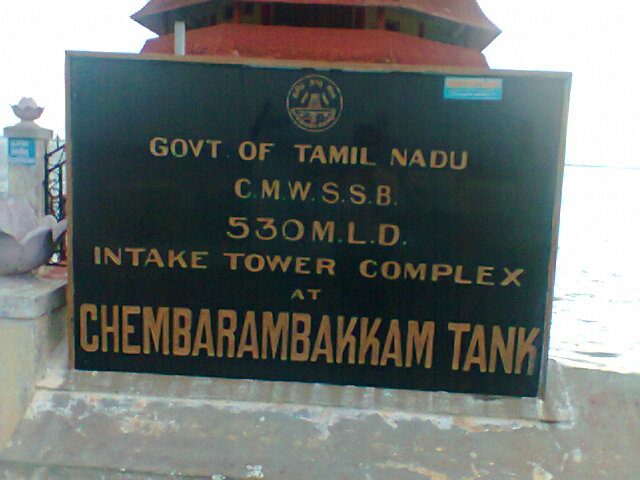
Chembarambakkam tank, drinking water provider of Chennai

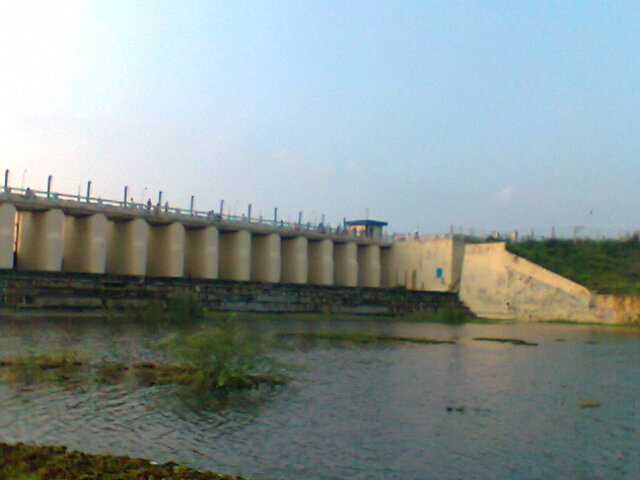
16-lock view of Chembarambakkam tank

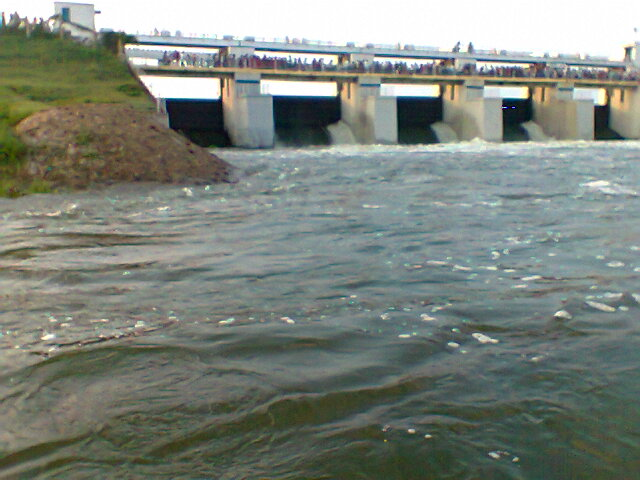
Main 5-lock view of Chembarambakkam tank

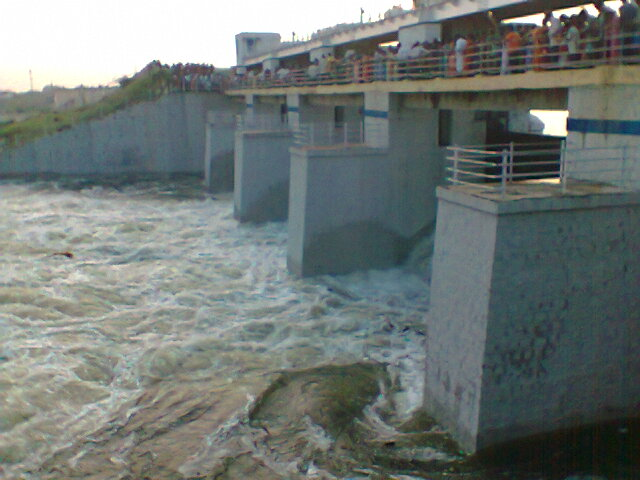
Water gushing out of tank when water was released during Sep-Oct of 2011

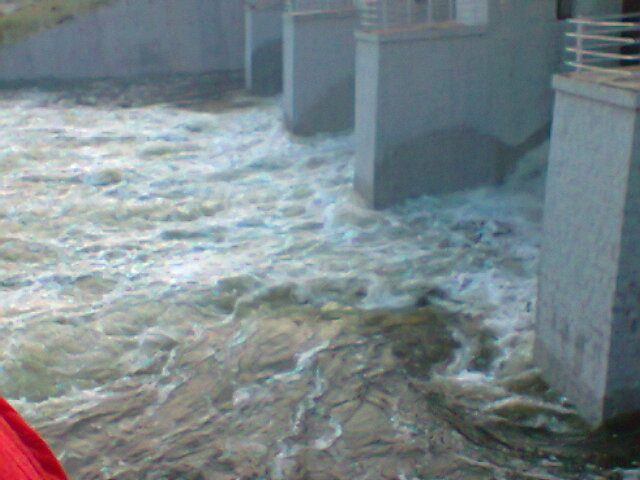
Water gushing out of tank when water was released during 2011

== See also ==
- Puzhal lake
- Water management in Chennai
- Birding in Chennai
