= Periyar Bridge =

Bridge in Chennai, India

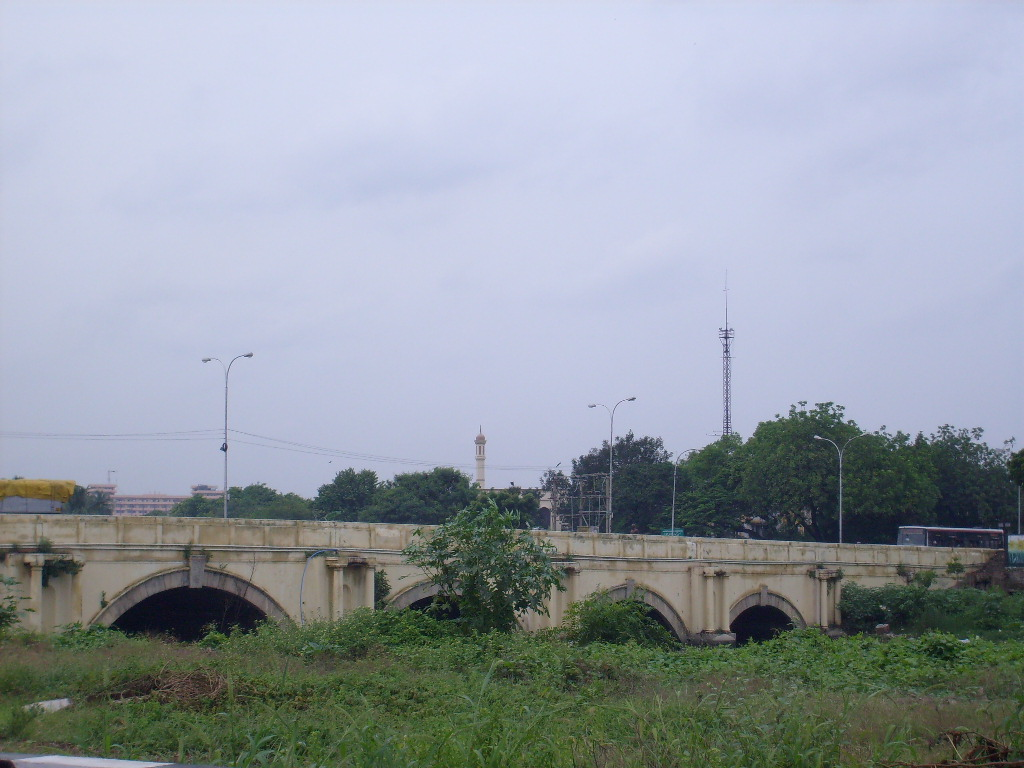
A view of the Periyar Bridge

Periyar Bridge, formerly known as St. George's Bridge and Triplicane Bridge, is a concrete river bridge in the city of Chennai, India. It connects the southern part of The Island with the city's neighbourhoods to the south of the Coovum River.

== History ==
The Periyar Bridge was constructed in 1805 as St. George's Bridge. Since it formed the main access to the neighbourhood of Triplicane from Fort St George, it was also known as Triplicane Bridge. The bridge was rebuilt in the 1920s. The St. George's Bridge was renamed as Periyar Bridge after India's independence.
