= Francesca Anna Canfield =

American linguist

- Born: Francisca Anna Pascalis; August 1803; Philadelphia, Pennsylvania, U.S.
- Died: May 23, 1833 (aged 29)
- Occupations: Linguist, poet, translator
- Spouse: Palmer Canfield
- Children: 4
- Writing career
- Pen name: Salonina
- Language: English

Francesca Anna Canfield (née, Pascalis; pen name, Salonina; August 1803 – May 23, 1833) was a 19th-century American linguist, poet, and translator. In writing, she seemed to have been constantly under the influence of the advice thus given to Pindar: "Moderate your fire; the axle of your chariot-wheels burns too soon."

== Early life and education ==
Francisca Anna Pascalis was born in Philadelphia, Pennsylvania, in August, 1803. She was the daughter of Felix Pascalis, M.D distinguished in the medical and philosophical world for his numerous dissertations on abstruse subjects, for his practice in the yellow fever, and other disorders, and as a political economist, who made efforts to introduce into the United States the Chinese mulberry tree, in order to encourage the making of silk in the U.S. Her mother was a native of Philadelphia. Her parents resided for some years after their marriage in Philadelphia. While she was a child, her parents removed to New York City, where Dr. Pascalis was acquainted with many eminent people, including Dr. Samuel L. Mitchill.

In school, Canfield was at the head of her class, and acquired languages with such readiness, that her instructors often suspected her father of devoting his time to bringing her forward, when he hardly knew what she was studying at the time. She made translations from the French, Italian, Spanish, and Portuguese, for amusement or for school exercises. Many of them were preserved by her friends, and showed evidences of genius. Early on, she learned universal grammar, and found no difficulty in understanding idioms of a language. Her poetical taste appeared early. At a young age, she wrote sonnets, criticisms, satires, hymns, and epistles to her friends in verse. Many of her productions were preserved, which she wrote between the ages of eleven and fifteen, that were excellent. The version of a French song, "Quand reverrai-je en un jour", was among the memorials at age fourteen, and though much less compact than the original, it was interesting as an illustration of her abilities.

Before Canfield left school, she translated from the French a volume of Johann Kaspar Lavater's work for a friend, who had engraved the plates of the work from the original. Soon after this, she translated the "Solitaire," from the French; the "Roman Nights," from Le notti romane al sepolcro degli Scipioni of Alessandro Verri; and the "Vine Dresser," from the French, at a subsequent period. The English of her works is extolled as excellent. In the Roman Nights: Or the Tomb of the Scipios, as it appeared in the English dress, there was much of the flow of Tully, with the delicacy of the best Italian writers. The Italian scholar, Dr. William Taylor, of the Catholic church, considered Canfield's Roman Nights, as the best translation he had ever read of any work from Italian.

== Career ==
Many of the periodicals of the day contained her compositions, both in prose and verse, including the Mirror, the Minerva. There were many of her tales, which purported to be translations, that were known to be originally from her study, never having been published before they appeared in English. Canfield used a pen name as she did not want it to be known that she wrote so much. One of her signatures was "Salonina." By this signature, she addressed to her friend, Dr. Mitchill, a poetical epistle, purporting to be a translation from Pierre-Antoine Lebrun.

A "marriage of convenience" was arranged for her with Palmer Canfield, a lottery vender and exchange broker. He was a man of enterprise, but failed soon after their marriage. The marriage of such an accomplished woman with Mr. Canfield was not considered as a very suitable one, and so it proved, although she made the best of every thing. Her husband published a paper called Canfield's Lottery Argus, Commercial and Exchange Telegraph, or National Miscellany, the great object of which was to give the public information connected with banks and brokerage, and in this area he was adept. To this, he added a literary department, of which his wife took charge. But few readers of miscellaneous literature thought of looking into such a paper for important matters, making her efforts almost entirely wasted. Many editors plundered her columns, thinking that they should never be detected. But as editor of this department, she continued to be a helpmate to her husband, while the paper existed, and it was continued for several years. She also wrote some critical notices of reviews.

== Personal life ==
Canfield preferred solitude, and a small circle of friends. Among other accomplishments, she was an excellent painter. She drew a landscape, a flower, a stream, or a human being, all with equal ease. Some of her copies of old pictures deceived professional painters. One of her copies was sold at auction for an original, and the mistake was not discovered until mentioned by her father. She was a tolerable musician, and played with some skill, although she had no passion for the art.

For some time prior to her death, she knew that her health was impaired, and that she would not live long. At the age of nineteen, she developed tuberculosis, which she struggled with for the next ten years. Canfield died on May 23, 1833, (Note: Wilson & Fiske (1887) record Canfield's date of death as May 28, 1823.) leaving four young children. Many of her verses appeared in a commercial gazette established by her husband, but his death in September of the same year, prevented the publication of an edition of her works, which he had prepared for that purpose.
