= Cooum River =

River in Tamil Nadu, India

Coordinates: 13.068107°N 80.28585°E

Cooum Triplicane
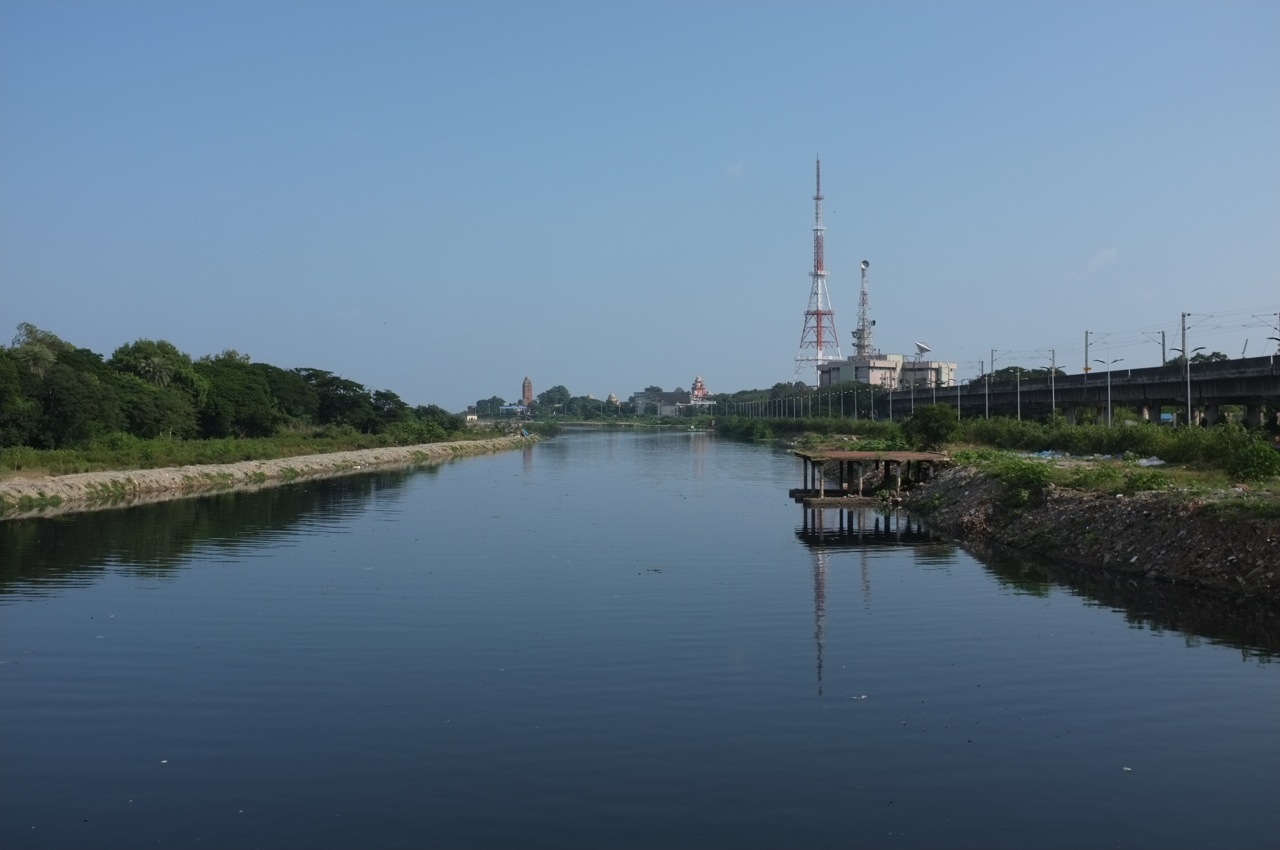
- Cooum River as viewed from the bridge connecting the Island Ground

Location
- Country: India
- State: Tamil Nadu
- City: Chennai

Physical characteristics
- Source
  - location: Kesavaram Anaicut, Ranipet district, Tamil Nadu, India
- Mouth: Cooum delta
  - location: Chennai, Tamil Nadu, India
  - elevation: 0 ft (0 m)
- Length: 40 mi (64 km)
- Discharge
  - location: Chepauk, Chennai

The Cooum River, or simply Koovam, is one of the shortest classified rivers draining into the Bay of Bengal. This river is about 72 km (45 mi) in length, flowing 32 km (20 mi) in the city of Chennai (urban part) and the rest in rural part. The river is highly polluted in the urban area (Chennai). Along with the Adyar River running parallel to the south and the Kosasthalaiyar River, the river trifurcates the city of Chennai and separates Northern Chennai from Central Chennai. It is also sometimes known as Thiruvallikenni river

Its source is in a place by the Kesavaram Anaicut built across Kallar river in Vellore district adjoining Chennai district. From its origin in the Kesavaram village to Thandurai (Pattabiram), Avadi, Thiruverkadu Anaikat, the river remains unpolluted. Beyond this point, the river is highly polluted till its mouth on the Bay of Bengal. In Chennai district, the river flows through three corporation zones—Kilpauk, Nungambakkam and Triplicane—for a total length of 16 kilometres (10 mi).

Owing to the intensive use of surface water upstream for agriculture, indiscriminate pumping of groundwater leading to reduced base flow in the river, formation of a sand bar at the mouth of the river, discharge of untreated sewage and industrial effluents, and encroachment along the banks, the river, especially downstream, has been highly polluted. In 2018 alone, about 21,665 tonnes of waste were removed from the river.

== History ==
The Cooum was earlier known as the Triplicane river. The name of Cooum appears to be derived from Tamil literature. The name may have been derived from the Tamil term coopam meaning 'well' or 'deep pit'. The word coovalan denotes a person who is well versed in the science of ground water, well water and stagnant water.

Once this river was said to have its origin in Dharmapuri district, but now due to some earth table changes, it has shortened its course to Thiruvallur district. Ancient documents from the nearby temples states about one 'reaching salvation' on having a dip in the Cooum. The Cooum river was then clean and unpolluted.

For centuries, Cooum has been an integral part of the socio-economic and cultural life of the city. Till the early twentieth century, it was a clean river, most suitable for navigation. In ancient times, it played a pivotal part in the far-flung maritime trade between the Roman Empire, South India and Sri Lanka. Cooum's proximity to the ancient port of Manarpha or Mylapore added to the river's strategic importance. Manarpha was frequented by Roman merchants who came here to buy Indian textiles, gemstones and spices. In return, India procured gold, silver, copper and high-quality wine from the Romans. Archaeologists have discovered ancient Roman wine jars, and Roman and Chinese coins, on the banks of the river. In the late eighteenth century, Pachaiyappa Mudaliar, a philanthropist, bathed in this river before offering prayers at the Komaleeswarar Temple in Komaleeswaranpet.

Cooum River and the nearby Elambore River (or North River), which flows into the Cooum at its mouth, were running very close to each other near the former Central Jail area opposite Chennai Central. During floods, both the watercourses inundated the whole area. In the 1700s, the two rivers were linked by a cut to equalise the floods in both the rivers and a bridge was constructed between these rivers in 1710 across the cut.

Polluted part of the Cooum is presently spoiled by filth and pollution, and the water quality has considered to be highly toxic and completely non-potable. The 2004 tsunami cleaned the mouth of the river; however, the river returned to its usual polluted self within a short period. Nevertheless, the river is still being used for drinking water needs of many villages in the banks of the unpolluted part of the river.

== Origin and course ==
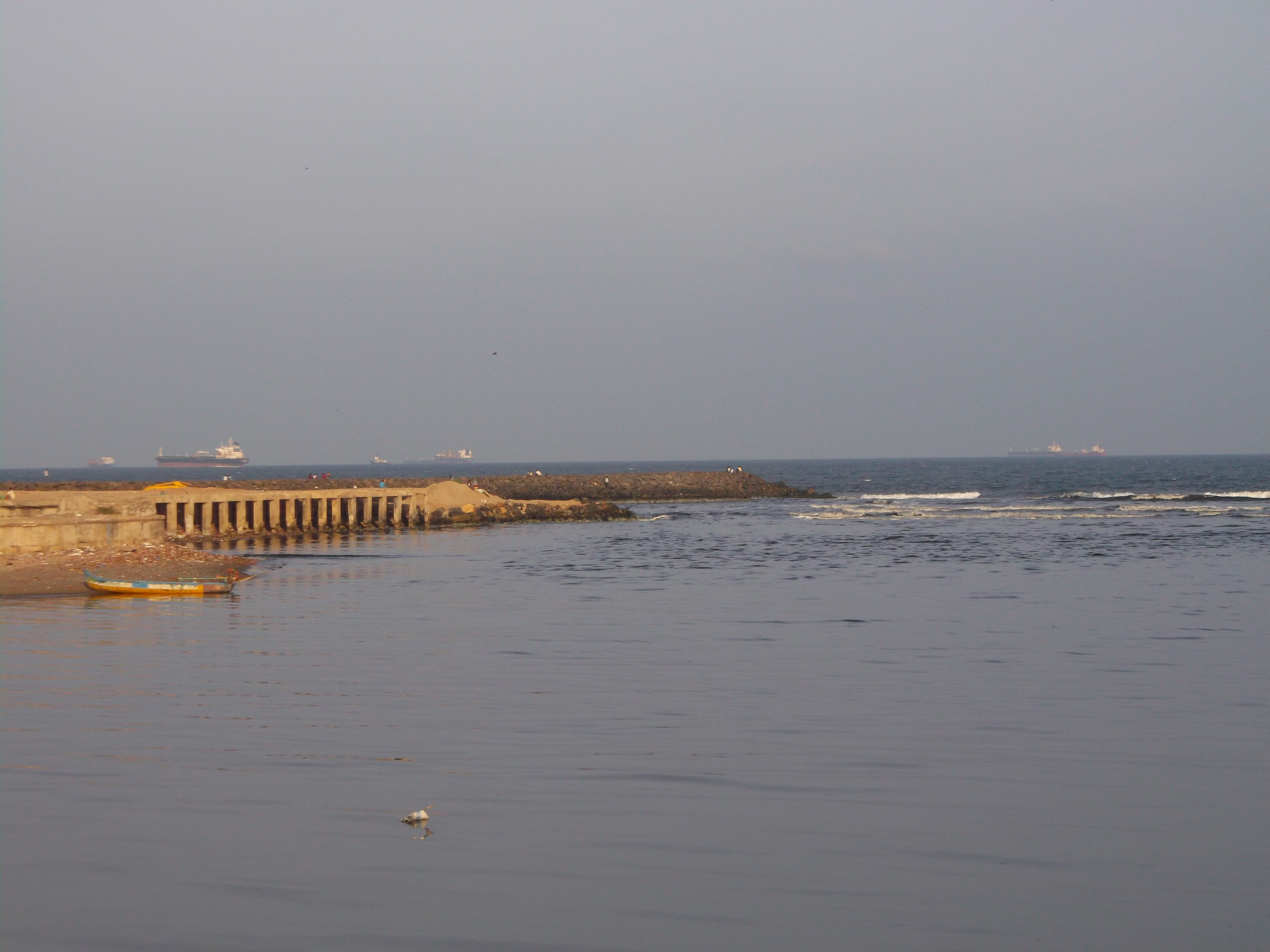
Causeway at the mouth of Cooum in the Bay of Bengal

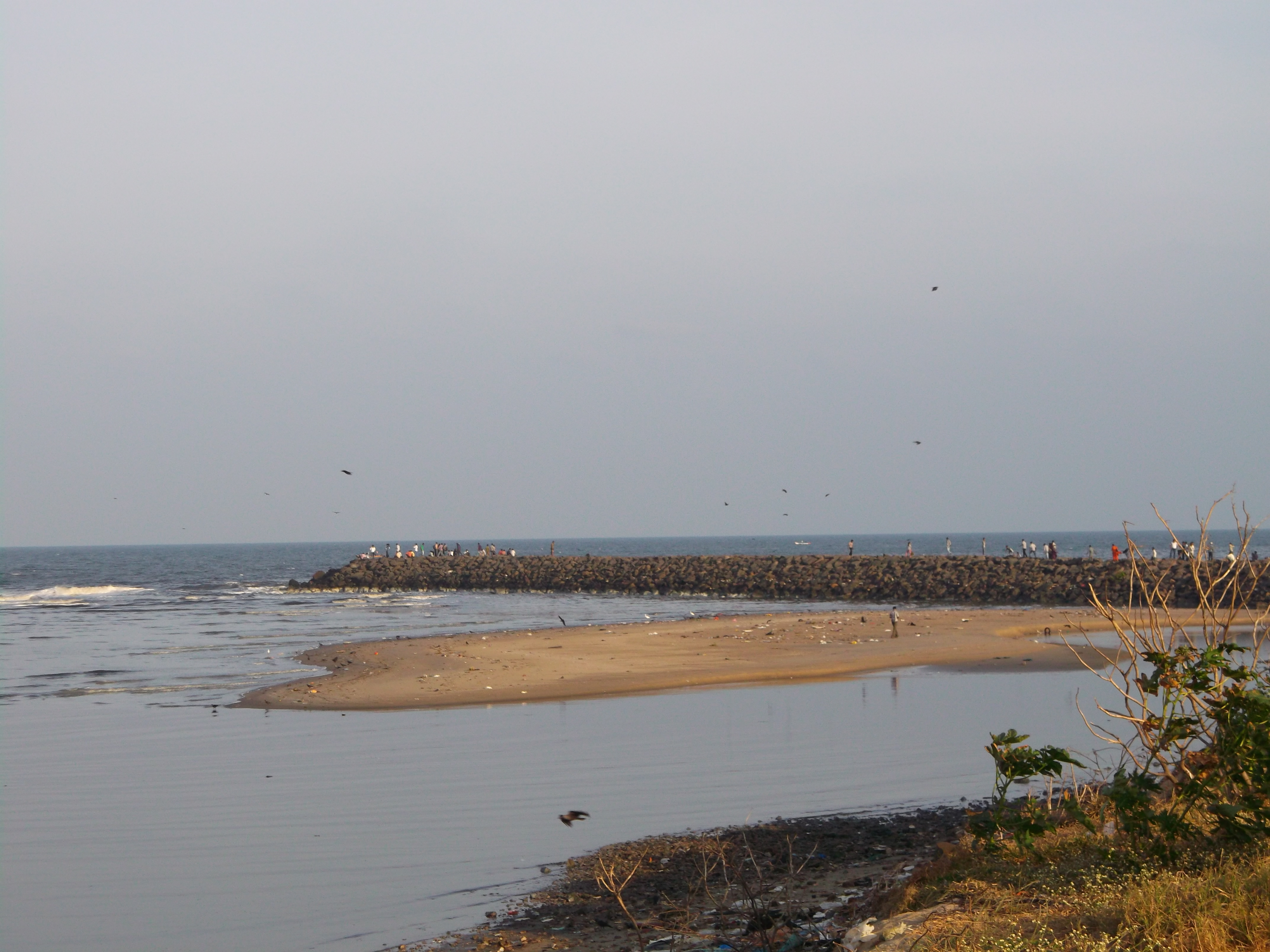
Tidal barriers at the Cooum Delta

The Cooum River originates in a village of the same name in Kadambathur union in Tiruvallur district, about 70 kilometres (43 mi) from Chennai, although starting its main course at Sattarai village, around 65 kilometres (40 mi) from Chennai. Flowing through Thiruverkadu, it enters the Chennai District at Arumbakkam after meandering for about 54 kilometres (34 mi). It then passes through some of the oldest residential areas for another 18 kilometres (11 mi) such as Choolaimedu, Chetpet, Egmore and Chintadripet, where the river channel is about 30 metres (98 ft) wide. Close to Egmore, the river forks into two—the northern and the southern arms—both of which join again near the Napier bridge, thus forming an island, known as the Island Grounds. The northern part of the Buckingham Canal joins the Cooum near the old Central Jail while the southern part of the same canal emerges from the river, just behind the University of Madras campus. The river finally joins the Bay of Bengal south of the Fort St George, just below the Napier Bridge. Once a fresh water source, it is today a drainage course inside the city of Chennai. The total length of the river is about 65 kilometres (40 mi). The river flows to a length of 40 kilometres (25 mi) in the Chennai Metropolitan Area, of which 16 kilometres (10 mi) fall within the Chennai district limits. The total catchment area of the river is about 400 square kilometres (150 mi^{2}), and the bed width ranges from 40 to 120 metres (130 to 390 ft). The capacity of the river is 19,500 cubic metres per second (690,000 cu ft/s), and the anticipated flood discharge is around 22,000 cubic metres per second (780,000 cu ft/s). Once a fishing river, it has borne the brunt of the city's unplanned developmental explosion. The Kesavaram dam diverts the river into the Chembarambakkam Lake from which water is used for the supply of drinking water to the city of Chennai. Thereafter, the flow of water in the river is much reduced.

Three ancient Shiva temples are located at the source of the river. The first is Tiruvirkolam, in Cooum village, and the other is at Ilambaiyankottur. The third is Thiruverkadu Shiva temple. Koyambedu temple is also in its banks. These temples have been featured in the Thevaram sung by the Saivite saint Thirugnana Sambandar. There is one more temple called the Veerebathrasami temple. The god in the temple is otherwise known as "Akoramoorthy". This temple is at Pillayarkuppam, 2 kilometres (1.2 mi) from Cooum village. In ancient Tamil Nadu, under the Chola Empire, the river Cooum was referred to as Kashtabudhyotpathihi. They all form a group of villages called Padhinaru Nattham. The river drains into the Bay of Bengal at Chepauk in Chennai marking the northernmost boundary of the Marina Beach. The delta also marks the southern boundary of the Port of Chennai.

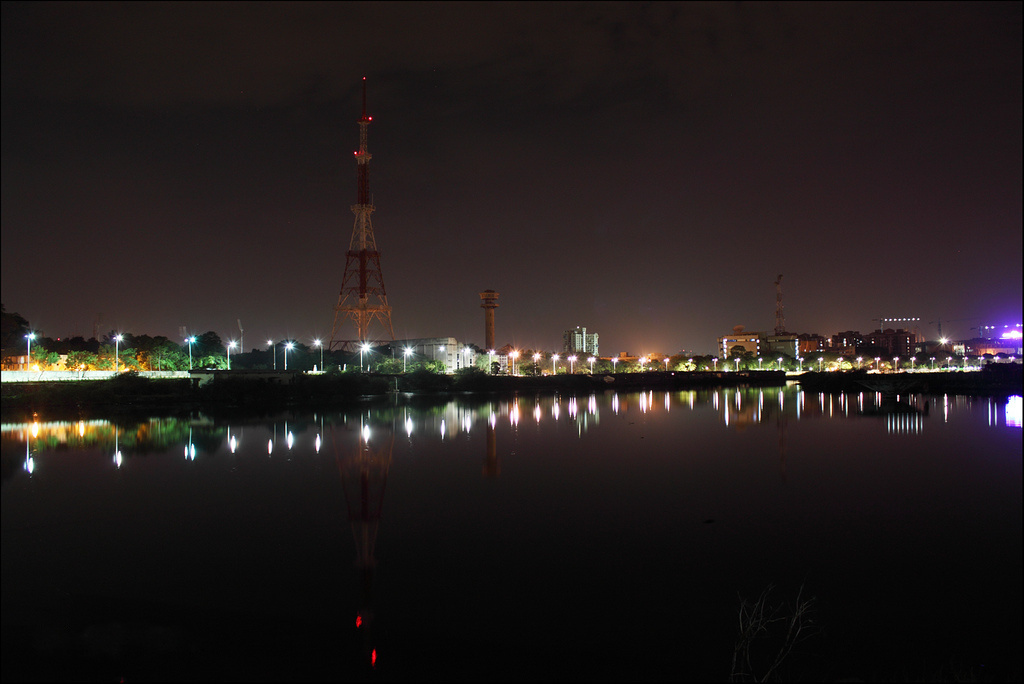
Coovum river as seen from the Napier Bridge

The width of the river course varies all along from 35 to 150 metres (115 to 492 ft), which includes the area occupied by the slums.

Variations in river course width within city limits (Source: HSCTC feasibility report)
Stretch	Original (survey) width (m)		Existing width (m)	
	Minimum	Maximum	Minimum	Maximum
River mouth–Napier Bridge	151	151	151	151
Napier Bridge–Periyar Bridge	126	146	45	60
Periyar Bridge–Coolways Bridge	126	135	51	58
Coolways Bridge–St. Andrew Bridge	94	131	60	62
St. Andrew Bridge (Arunachala Street)–Harris Bridge	87	93	49	58
Harris Bridge–Ethiraj Bridge	82	98	46	51
Ethiraj Bridge–College Bridge	97	173	40	52
College Bridge–Mc. Nicholas Road	99	118	47	53
Mc. Nicholas Road–Choolaimedu Bridge	68	95	37	53
Poonamallee High Road–Anna Arch Road	71	102	43	45
Anna Arch Road–Anna Nagar 8th Main Road	79	150	62	64
Anna Nagar 8th Main Road–Inner Ring Road	71	95	44	101
Inner Ring Road–Mogappair Estate Road	89	144	46	101
Mogappair Estate Road–Vanagaram Ambattur Road	76	110	46	92

== Islets and the river mouth ==
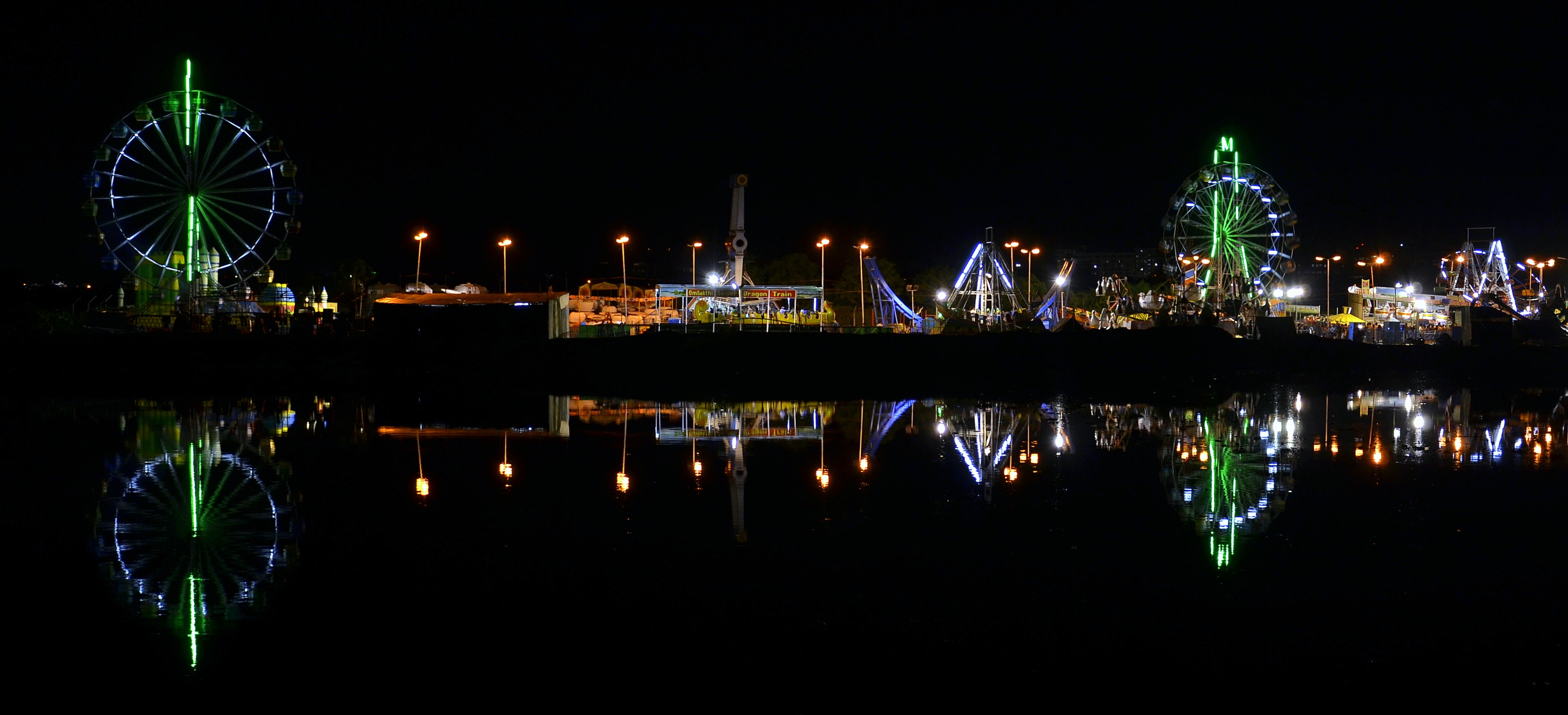
Annual trade fair held at the Island Grounds

The major islet in the course of the river is the Island Grounds in Chennai less than a kilometre from the mouth. The river splits into two near Chinthadripet and encircles a piece of land isolating it from the surrounding land before draining into the eastern sea. However, the mouth of the river is not too wide and does not have any islet. The river mouth has groynes running to a total length of nearly 250 metres (820 ft). The opening between the groynes is about 170 metres (560 ft) to facilitate tidal action. The impact of high tide bringing in sea water is felt for nearly 3 kilometres (2 mi) in the river. At present, the river has to be periodically cleaned to prevent sand deposits near the river mouth, close to the Napier bridge, which are removed at frequent intervals using at least two machines to facilitate tidal action and avoid flooding. About 80,000 cubic metres (2,800,000 cu ft) of sand were removed in 2010–11.

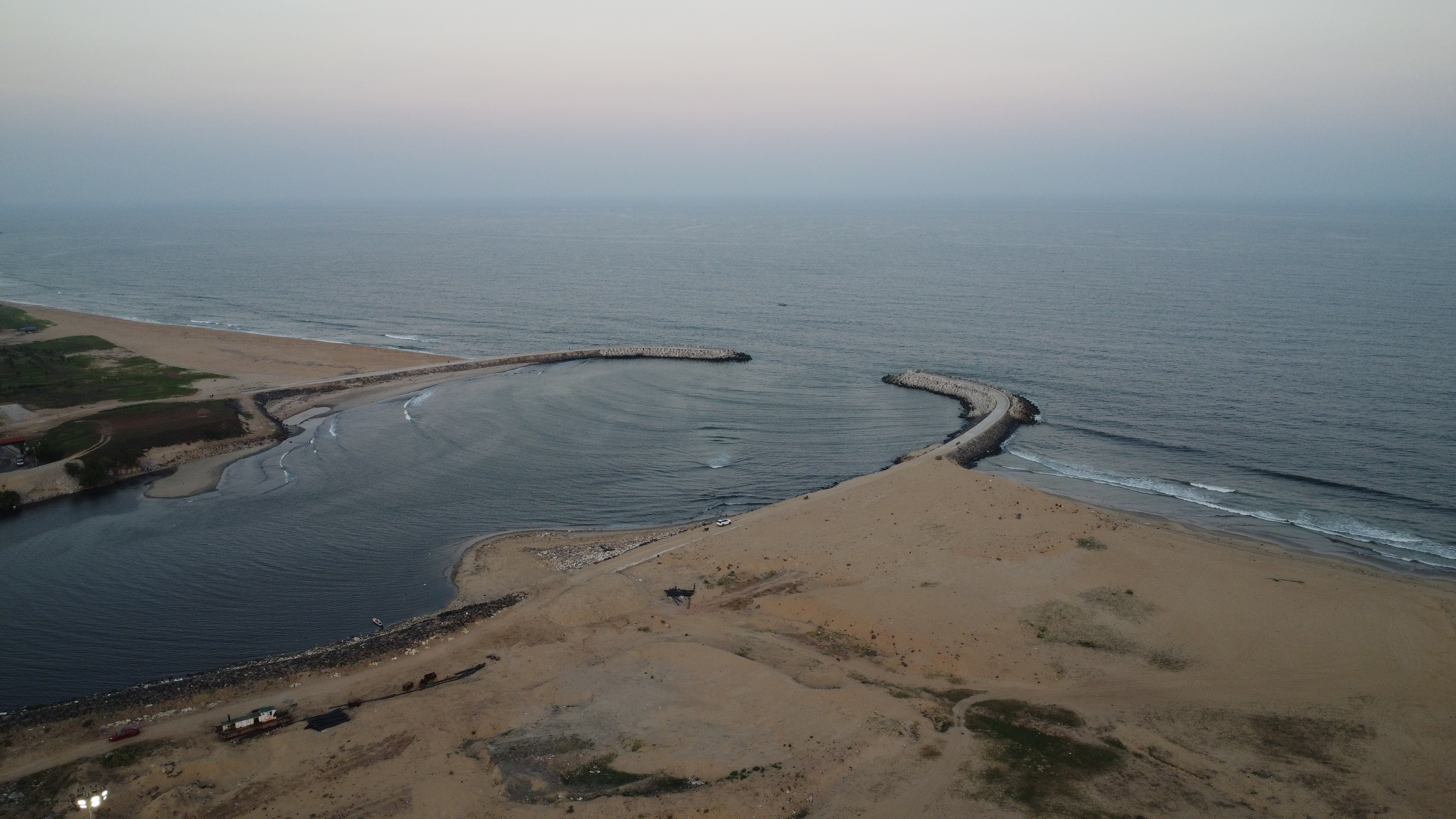
Cooum River joining the Bay of Bengal

The river basin spans an area of 505.88 square kilometers.

== Bridges ==
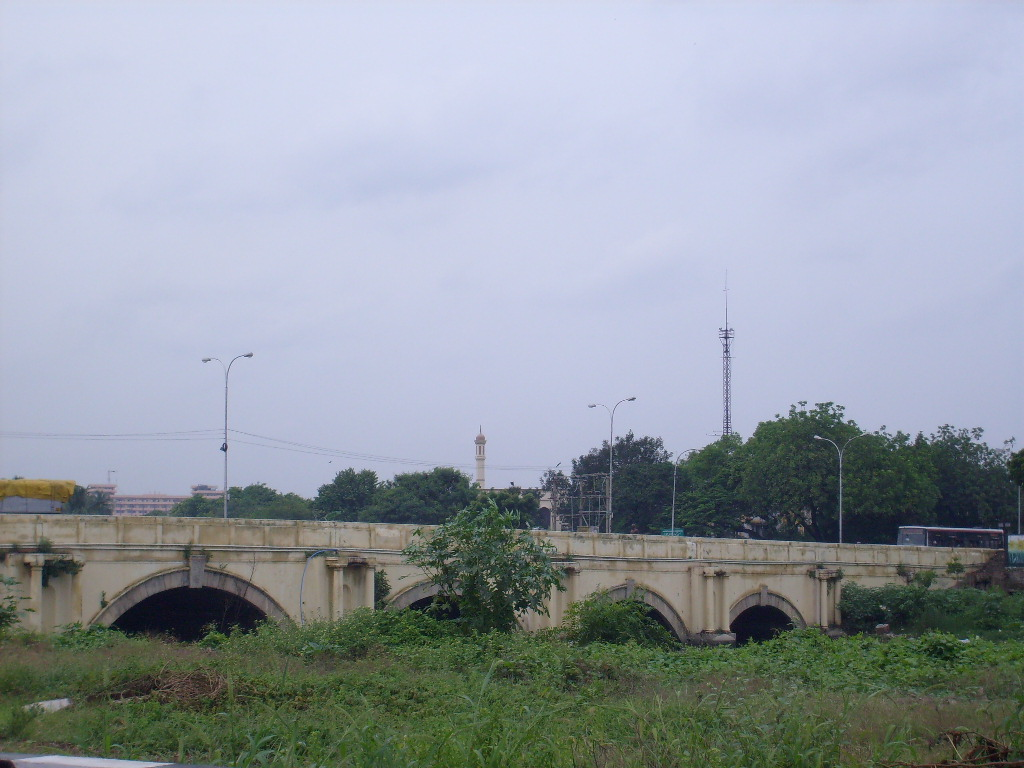
Periyar Bridge Chennai

There are nine major bridges built over the urban part of the river. These are the Napier Bridge, the Wallajah Bridge, the Periamet Bridge, the Chintradripet Bridge or the St Andrew's Bridge, Harris Bridge, Commander-in-Chief Road Bridge, College Road Bridge, Spur Tank Bridge and the Aminjikarai Bridge. Apart from these there are several smaller bridges built across the river. The Corporation of Chennai maintains about 13 of these bridges.

A new bridge across the river connecting Golden George Nagar in Mogappair with Nerkundram is being constructed by the state highways department at a cost of ₹ 113 million. Work started in August 2010 and is expected to be completed by March 2013. The bridge with 10 spans measures about 110 metres (360 ft) long and nearly 24 metres (79 ft) wide, accommodating six-lane traffic, with space provisions for bicycles and pedestrians.

== Flora and fauna ==
According to scientists, around 1950, Cooum had 49 species of fish, and by the late 1970s, this was reduced to 21 species. However, on date, there are no fish in the river, owing to highly toxic pollutants found in the river water.

== Pollution ==
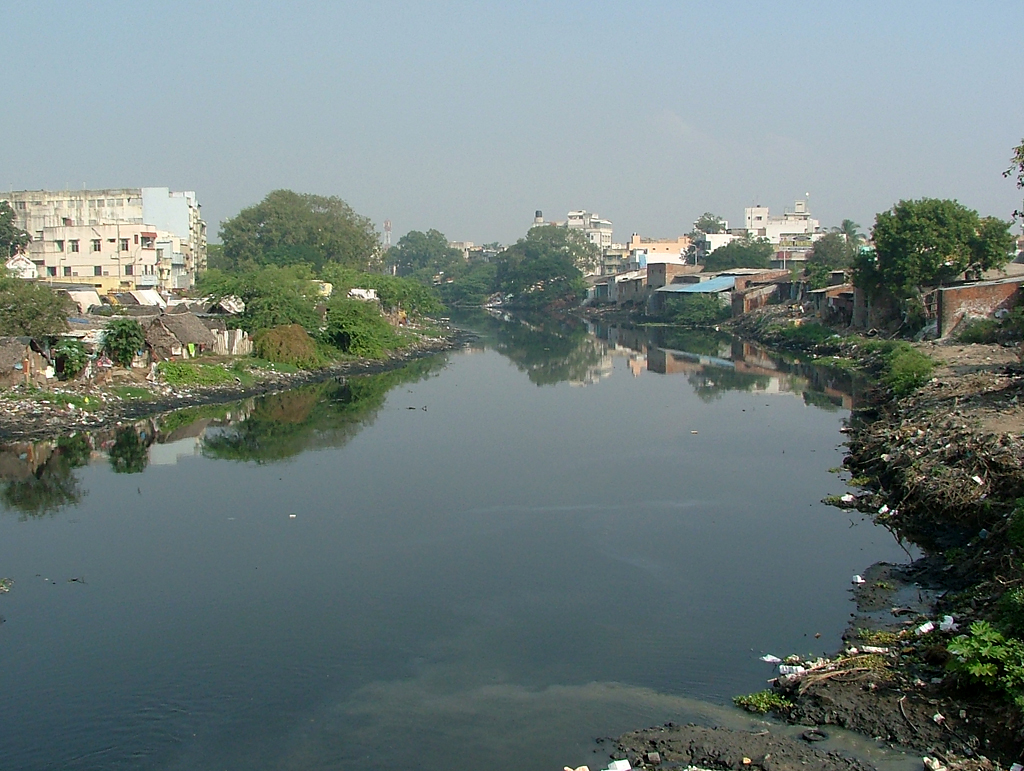
The river is one of the most polluted waterbodies in the country

The river is narrow, placid, slow and meandering. The river is primarily fed by discharge from tank and water bodies and has seen a steady drop in freshwater over the years, a primary reason for its present-day condition. However, the core problem of the Cooum has been that due to the sand bar, the river mouth near the Napier Bridge gets blocked for most of the time, preventing the river water from draining into the sea. This has, eventually, made the river, in its 18-km-long stretch in the central district, a stinking cesspool.

Tests of water samples reveals almost zero dissolved oxygen and substantial presence of faecal coliform bacteria, besides heavy metals such as lead, zinc and cadmium.

The study of the river was undertaken as part of a World Bank-funded project and shows that it is 80 per cent more polluted than treated sewer. Fish were able to survive in the water for only 3 to 5 hours even after samples were diluted. There are traces of heavy metals like copper and pesticides like endosulphan and lindane in it. Public Works Department sources said government agencies like Chennai Corporation and business units and retail outlets on the banks of the river were responsible for the pollution. The water has almost no dissolved oxygen, and instead there are traces of heavy metals like copper, besides sewage and sludge. Due to its narrowness and about 3,500 illegal hutments along its banks, it has not been recently desilted, which has closed it to river traffic. Per 2003 enumeration, about 9,000 families live along the river, in addition to 450 shops and commercial buildings. There are 700-odd points in the river bank where sewage flows straight into the river. There are 127 identified sewage outfalls into the river, out of which 85 are in use.

Nearly 30 per cent of the estimated 55 million litres (15,000,000 US gal) of untreated sewage being let into the waterways of Chennai daily, including by Chennai Metropolitan Water Supply and Sewerage Board, gets into the Cooum river. About 60 per cent of the untreated sewage gets into the Buckingham Canal and the Adyar River takes the rest. In 2010, about 340 sewage outfalls into the waterways were identified. Of them, more than 130 sewage outfalls were in the Cooum River and a majority of them were between Aminjikarai and Nungambakkam. In some of the spots in areas such as Maduravoyal, more than 7 tonnes of municipal solid waste is being dumped in the river every day.

Fortunately, there is another 42 km of this river which is still not polluted (as of the year 2015), which can be used to transport the water into Chennai and to store drinking water for Chennai's needs. There is a huge amount of sand deposits in the banks of the unpolluted part of the Cooum river that could rejuvenate the ground water level of numerous villages in the banks of this river.

== Cleanup ==
According to the records available with the state public department, efforts to restore the waterway first began back in 1872 under the British. The earliest recorded proposal was mooted in 1890. After Independence, the then chief minister C. N. Annadurai launched a Cooum Improvement Scheme at a cost of ₹ 19 million in September 1967, six months after the Dravida Munnetra Kazhagam (DMK) party came to power for the first time in the state, when M. Karunanidhi was PWD minister. The project comprised installation of a regulator and a sand pump at the river mouth, protecting the sides of the river with cement concrete slabs from the Chetput bridge to the Napier Bridge, provision of a walkway on either side of the river, removal of encroachments on the banks of the river and, more importantly, the diversion of sewage. In addition, seven boat jetties were built. In February 1973, when Karunanidhi was chief minister, he launched a pleasure boat service at a cost of ₹ 22 million, and roving boats, powered boats and paddle boats were made available at a nominal charge. However, the efforts went futile when the sand pump developed snags. Incidentally, the jetties built for the purpose still dot the riverfront.

In 1996, when the DMK returned to power, the government made another bid—this time covering all important watercourses, including the Buckingham Canal and the Adyar. This resulted in the implementation of the ₹ 12,000-million Chennai City River Conservation Project (CCRCP) in January 2001, which was substantially supported by the Union Environment and Forests Ministry. This time, the new project aimed at arresting the sewage outfalls and strengthening the sewer network. However, this too did not yield the desired results since the project did not cover Tiruvallur district, which accounts for 54 kilometres (34 mi) of the river stretch.

After the DMK took charge again in May 2006, the eco-restoration of the Cooum again came to the fore. To facilitate the implementation of the project, the Chennai River Authority, headed by the Deputy Chief Minister, was formed in December 2009 to clean up the entire stretch of the river within 10 years. This aimed at coordinating the implementation of various projects.

In 2010, the Tamil Nadu government signed an MoU with Singapore Cooperation Enterprise (SEC), a Singapore agency for the restoration project. The agency prepared a preliminary report after discussions with various stake holders of the project including Chennai Corporation, municipal administrations, Metrowater, Pollution Control Board, Slum Clearance Board and the public works department.

There is currently the World Bank–funded Irrigated Agriculture Modernisation and Water Bodies Restoration and Management Project to clean up the river, under which the upper reaches of the river are proposed to be covered. The World Bank has approved ₹ 224.1 million for the Cooum restoration project towards development of its irrigation potential. Improving the irrigation efficiency of Cooum upstream is one of the main objectives of the project. The upper region of the river, mainly Kancheepuram, Chengalpattu and Thiruvallur districts, will be benefiting from this special fund.

A team from Chennai has visited San Antonio in Texas to see how they successfully did the clean-up of a polluted river. The team comprised former Deputy Chief Minister M. K. Stalin, former Chennai Mayor M. Subramaniam and other senior officers. One of the city's dream projects is to clean up this river on or before 2020. The initiative has been taken up by the Central and State governments to clean up the river and rediscover the pleasures of traditional boat racing. The Chennai Rivers Restoration Trust (CRRT) has asked the Chennai Corporation to chalk out an action plan to remove construction debris dumped on the banks of the river.

The Water Resources Department (WRD) started flushing a 30-kilometre (19 mi) stretch of the Cooum in December 2010, initially discharging about 5.7 cubic metres per second (200 cu ft/s) of surplus water from the Poondi reservoir into the river.

In September 2011, the WRD began cleaning the river at a cost of ₹ 10.2 million and the work is expected to be completed within a fortnight.

In 2012, the government allotted ₹ 3,000 million towards construction of 337 sewage cleaning systems in the waterways in the city, including 105 locations in the Cooum river. Others include 49 points in Adyar river and 183 locations in the Buckingham Canal.

Tamilnadu State Water Resources Department (WRD) Minister N. Anand on August 27, 2026 launched desilting work

== Other developments ==
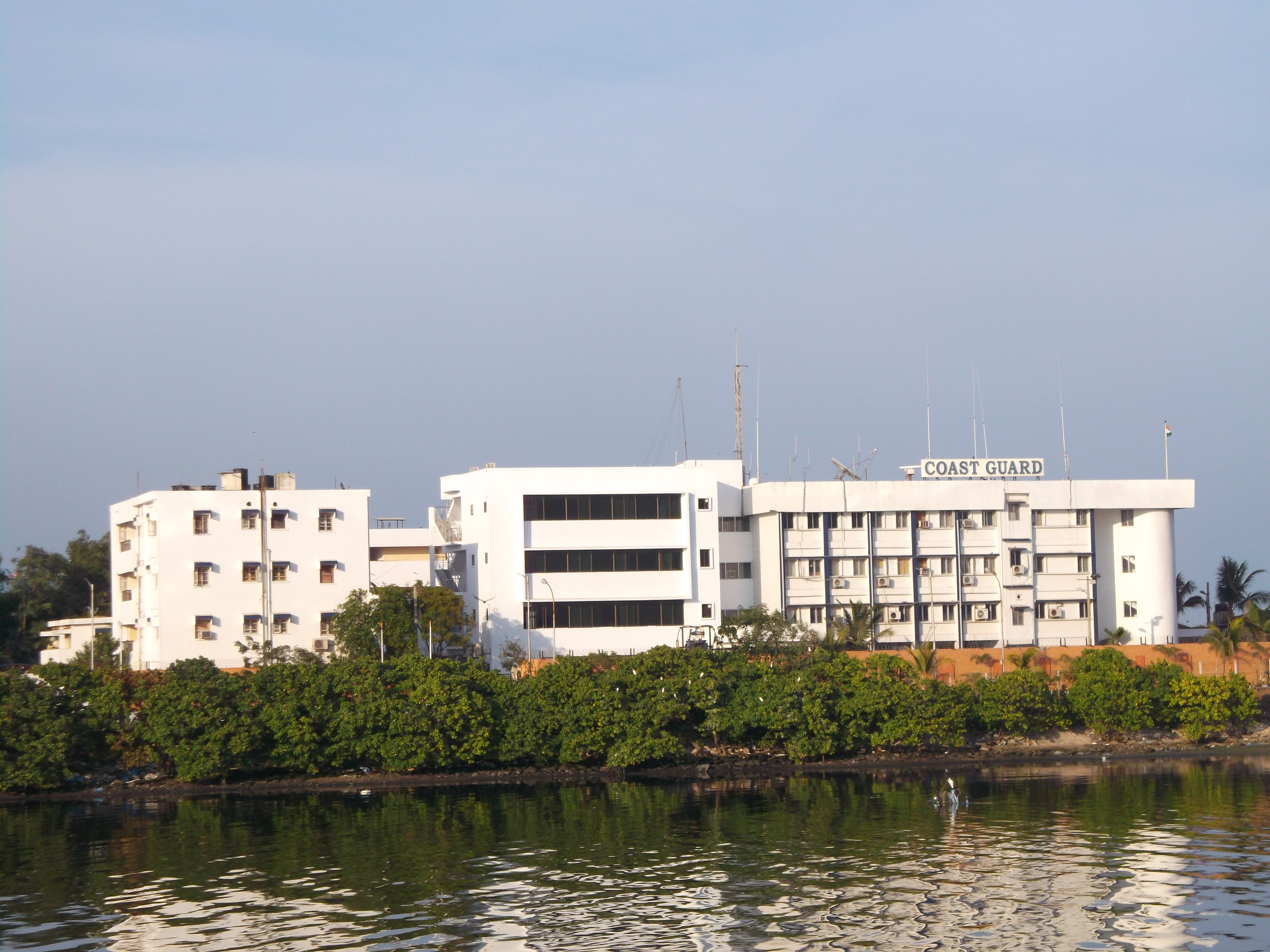
Coast Guard building on the banks of Cooum

A visitor centre near the mouth of the river on the Marina Beach, similar to the Marina Barrage Visitor Centre in Singapore and San Antonio Visitor Center in the United States, has been planned as part of an initiative to create awareness of the need for clean waterways.

In 2011, the Tamil Nadu Sailing Association planned to build a marina at the mouth of the Cooum river along the southern bank, where yachts and pleasure boats could dock. The ₹ 300-million project involves first building a breakwater in the sea so that the waters at the marina are placid and the boats do not keep bobbing up and down with the incursion of waves. However, the by-catch is a more important function—the breakwater will prevent silting and clogging of the river's mouth, allowing for structures such as a boat repair facility, a base for the Tamil Nadu Coastal Police, and sailing academy to be put up on the bank. By 2013, the estimate for the setting up of a sailing centre and marina to accommodate 24 yachts has increased to ₹ 450 million.

A nature trail along the river has been proposed for which a draft ecological plan has been prepared by the Tamil Nadu Urban Infrastructure and Financial Services Limited (TNUIFSL). The project is planned from College Road bridge to Chetpet bridge by the Chennai River Restoration Trust in view of the biological diversity of the area which was undisturbed for decades. According to the draft ecological plan, floral species such as Indian almond, black wattle, sacred fig, madras thorn, Indian mulberry, neem, banyan, magizham, Indian cork tree, punnai, sirukkambil, karumugai, shenbagam, bayur tree, kadamba, pavazha malli, vetiver grass, palmarosa, agave, lemon grass and subabul would be part of species along the nature trail which would play a role in erosion management. The nature trail would be based on an "elevated boardwalk" model with "uncompressed natural wood" and "fibre reinforced plastic". The entry and exit would be on College Road near the DPI complex. Apart from the parking facilities on the DPI premises, a stretch along the road between the entry point and the College Road Bridge would be demarcated for additional parking. Five points located at 200-metre (660 ft) intervals along the trail have been selected for erecting break-out areas including one for a canopy walk. The facility has been planned without electrical fittings and has been designed as a "day trail".

It is proposed that Chennai Metro rails are to be built about 30 metres (98 ft) under the bed of the river. The line that comes from the Madras High Court area reaches the metro's Central station in front of Ripon Building, crosses the river and passes underneath the neighbourhoods of Chintadripet to reach the underground station at the new secretariat on Anna Salai. The tunnels for the metro rail are to be made without cutting open the ground, with giant machines boring the tunnels as the river flows above. Custom-made tunnel boring machines costing ₹ 600 million each have been imported from Germany for the purpose.

== Eco restoration and nature trail ==
Key aspects of the Cooum river eco-restoration plan includes 11 maintenance ways of 9.6 km, 22 walkways of 24 km, and 17 cycle tracks of 19 km, in addition to 24 parks and riverfront vegetation. The total budget for the eco-restoration is ₹ 19,340 million.

As part of the eco-restoration, in July 2018, the corporation began work on the 1.5-km nature trail between the College Road bridge in Nungambakkam and the Munroe bridge in Chetput. Modelled on the San Antonio River Walk in the United States, the trail is being built in two phases at a cost of ₹ 98.2 million and includes a butterfly park in a 5000 square meter area. Given the raise in the maximum flood level in the past years being 70% to 5.94 meters, the boardwalk has been increased from 3.5 meters to more than 6 meters using corrosion-resistant steel. The boardwalk will measure 1.65 meters and will be covered with greenery, with a provision to park 70 vehicles. The butterfly park will be built in the second phase.

== Occasional water flows ==
During the Indian Ocean tsunami of 2004, the empty waterway enabled it to take in much of the incoming ocean water. Disaster Management Analysts this would not have been possible if the river had been in full flow.

In November 2005, three days of torrential rains flushed out the waste and cleaned up the river, and the river looked clear for a brief period. Egrets and cormorants too were cited flocking the river to feast on fish. The river discharged the floodwater at a rate of about 21,500 cubic metres per second (760,000 cu ft/s).

== Legacy ==
A 1928 poem by V. H. Shipley describes the river as follows:

Of dirt and smell your sources wake... And near the sea where one would think Your water might be cleaner, It forms a cesspit by the bridge, Adjoining the Marina. Oh viscid stream! Oh smelling flood. Oh green and beastly river!

== See also ==
- Adyar river
- Kosasthalaiyar river
- Water management in Chennai
- List of most-polluted rivers
