= Pornanong Aramwit =

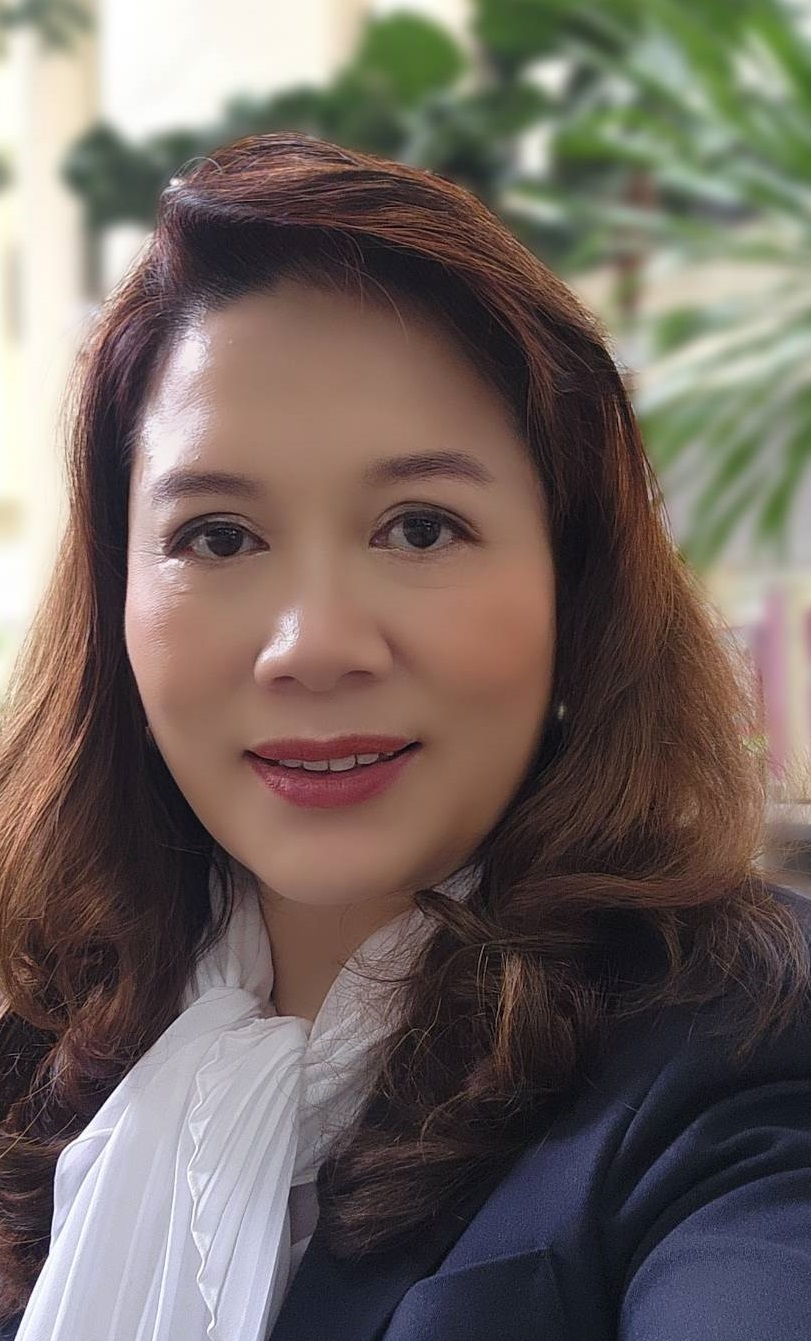
- Born: 1970 (age 55–56)
- Occupations: Pharmaceutical scientist, pharmacist, academic, and author
- Awards: Outstanding Professional Women Award, Federation of Business and Professional Women of Thailand (2019); National Outstanding Researcher Award, National Research Council of Thailand (NRCT) (2024)

Academic background
- Education: Chulalongkorn University; University of Illinois-Chicago; University of Wisconsin–Madison
- Thesis: The Effect of Serum Albumin and Pluronics on the Aggregation State and Toxicity of Polyene Macrolides (2000)

Academic work
- Institutions: Chulalongkorn University (CU)

Pornanong Aramwit (Thai: พรอนงค์ อร่ามวิทย์, RTGS: Phon-anong Aramwit; born 1970) is a pharmaceutical scientist, pharmacist, academic, and author. She serves as the Vice President in Research and Innovation at Chulalongkorn University (CU) and is also a member of the university's Council, Administrative Board of the National Innovation Agency, and the Royal Society of Thailand.

Aramwit's research has encompassed protein research, including silk proteins, biomaterials, tissue engineering, and herbal substances. She has conducted clinical studies in nephrology and dermatology, focusing on materials for wound healing applications. She is an inventor of medical devices and in the food industry, and has received awards including the Merits of Leadership Award Grand Officer Level: Number of the cross 1156 from the UK, the Merits of Innovation Grand Officer Level: Number of the cross 30705 from France, and the Merits of Innovation Ribbon of Honor: Number of the cross 16834 from Belgium, as well as from the European Union and Spain. Additionally, she was awarded the 2018 Ambassador Award for Innovator with Outstanding Achievements, the 2019 Outstanding Professional Women Award by the Federation of Business and Professional Women of Thailand, and the 2024 National Outstanding Researcher Award by the National Research Council of Thailand (NRCT).

Aramwit has authored more than 220 peer-reviewed articles, authored/co-authored several books and book chapters, and has 20 patents.

Aramwit has served as a jury member on their boards, which include Brussels Innova, Innova Barcelona, Inova-Budi Uzor (Croatia), the Iranian Top Inventor Association, and INTARG.

== Education ==
Aramwit completed a BSc in Pharmacy at CU in 1992; DPh at the University of Illinois-Chicago in 1995 and a PhD at the University of Wisconsin–Madison in 2001.

== Career ==
Aramwit's career started as a Formulator/Research Investigator at Pfizer Pharmaceutical Worldwide in the USA. She then served as the deputy director for International Affairs and Immigrant Workers at the Internal Security Operations Command in Thailand from April 2014 to 2017. Since then, she has been serving as the Acting Vice President on the President and Administrative Board, while concurrently holding the position of Director of Research Projects at Center of Excellence in Bioactive Resources for Innovative Clinical Applications (BRICA) and Dean of the Faculty of Pharmaceutical Sciences at the Department of Pharmacy Practice (PharmCU) at CU. Within these roles, she oversaw collaborations on nutritional supplements with Innobic (Asia) and TISTR, led skincare product development with CU Innovation Hub and UMI Deeptech, and contributed to StemAktiv's research, highlighting its potential in skincare and aging treatment with safe herbal extracts, while also overseeing CU's Faculty of Pharmaceutical Sciences signing an MOU with Mahidol University and another MOU with Degree Plus. In addition, she has been appointed as an adjunct professor in the Faculty of Pharmacy at the Silpakorn University in Thailand and a visiting professor at the Institute of Natural Medicine of the University of Toyama in Japan.

== Research ==
=== Bioactive materials and wound healing ===
Aramwit authored Silk: Properties, Production and Uses in 2012, delving into the applications of silkworm products in medicine and textiles. In 2021, she co-wrote Sustainable Uses of Byproducts from Silk Processing with Narendra Reddy, focusing on the sustainable use of silk by-products across materials, energy, food, cosmetics, and environmental cleanup, with an emphasis on silk proteins in industries like cancer treatment and pharmaceuticals. Her research on silk sericin highlighted fibroin's applications in textiles and biomaterials, alongside discoveries in cosmetics and pharmaceuticals. While examining the effects of different extraction methods on sericin's properties, including cell behavior and collagen production, she found that urea-extracted sericin most effectively reduced melanin content and cellular tyrosinase activity, suggesting its potential use in treating hyperpigmentation. Additionally, she noted sericin's induction of IL-1β and TNF-α in vitro without other inflammatory effects.

Aramwit found that sericin reduced inflammation, sped healing, and boosted collagen in rat wounds, with anti-inflammatory effects comparable to betamethasone and calcitriol in her psoriasis study. She later developed eco-friendly agarose and sericin scaffolds for enhanced drug release and wound healing.

=== Biopolymer and nanotechnology applications ===
Aramwit coedited Nanotechnology in Drug Delivery with Glen S. Kwon and Melgardt M. de Villiers, exploring nanotechnology-based drug delivery systems and their application for the delivery of small molecules, proteins, peptides, oligonucleotides, and genes. Her research highlighted that alginate/chitosan beads enhance the stability and bioavailability of mulberry-extracted anthocyanin, with 0.05% chitosan solution proving most effective for encapsulation and gastric resistance, while Eugenol-embedded calcium citrate nanoparticles (Eu-CaCit NPs) show potential as a biocompatible topical delivery system, improving dermal penetration and reducing skin irritation.

=== Clinical and therapeutic evaluations ===
Aramwit's work has encompassed clinical and therapeutic evaluations across various health conditions. She found that mulberry leaves containing 12 mg of 1-deoxynojirimycin reduced fasting plasma glucose and glycated hemoglobin in obese individuals with borderline diabetes, with minimal side effects, and observed that their leaf powder also lowered triglyceride, LDL, and CRP levels in patients with mild dyslipidemia. In her collaborative studies, she discovered periostin as a biomarker for kidney disease severity in IgA nephropathy, demonstrated oxymetholone's muscle-enhancing effects in hemodialysis patients with liver injury risks, and detected ultrafiltration failure and fibrosis in long-term peritoneal dialysis patients through CA125 levels. Among other research works, she developed P80, a longan extract spray reducing viral adhesion, including COVID-19, as a prevention alternative, and explored crocetin's anti-cancer properties.

== Awards and honors ==
- 2014 – Silver Medal for "erma-Promp: Socks for xerosis treatment in diabetic feet, 42nd International Exhibition of Inventions of Geneva
- 2018 – Leader of Innovation prize, 11th International Invention and Innovation Show INTARG
- 2019 – Leadership Award (Grand Officer), British High Commission
- 2019 – Outstanding Professional Women Award, Federation of Business and Professional Women of Thailand
- 2021 – Gold Medal for "Sericin and chitosan cream for preventing and limiting the progressive of pressure sore", International Invention & Trade Expo
- 2024 – National Outstanding Researcher Award, NRCT

== Bibliography ==
=== Books ===
- Nanotechnology in Drug Delivery (2008) ISBN 978-0387776675
- Silk: Properties, Production and Uses (2012) ISBN 978-1621006923
- Sustainable Uses of Byproducts from Silk Processing (2021) ISBN 978-3527347865

=== Selected articles ===
- Aramwit, P., & Sangcakul, A. (2007). The effects of sericin cream on wound healing in rats. Bioscience, biotechnology, and biochemistry, 71(10), 2473–2477.
- Aramwit, P., Kanokpanont, S., De-Eknamkul, W., & Srichana, T. (2009). Monitoring of inflammatory mediators induced by silk sericin. Journal of bioscience and bioengineering, 107(5), 556–561.
- Aramwit, P., Bang, N., & Srichana, T. (2010). The properties and stability of anthocyanins in mulberry fruits. Food research international, 43(4), 1093–1097.
- Aramwit, P., Kanokpanont, S., Nakpheng, T., & Srichana, T. (2010). The effect of sericin from various extraction methods on cell viability and collagen production. International Journal of Molecular Sciences, 11(5), 2200–2211.
- Aramwit, P., Siritientong, T., & Srichana, T. (2012). Potential applications of silk sericin, a natural protein from textile industry by-products. Waste Management & Research, 30(3), 217–224.
