= 2005 December Chennai stampede =

Human stampede in Tamil Nadu, India

- Date: 18 December 2005
- Location: MGR Nagar Chennai; 13°2′4″N 80°11′49″E
- Deaths: 42
- Injuries: 37

The 2005 December Chennai stampede incident happened on 18 December 2005 in a school at MGR Nagar in Chennai, the capital of the South Indian state of Tamil Nadu, where the relief supplies were distributed by the state government for the people affected by severe flooding. There were 42 deaths in the accident, which left another 37 injured. The Supreme Court observed that the Tamil Nadu government, led at the time by the AIADMK party, along with government offices, bore responsibility for administrative lapses that contributed to the stampede. Then the state government appointed a one-man commission under retired justice A. Raman to look into the enquiry. The state government also announced a compensation of ₹100,000 for all the victims and ₹15,000 for the injured.

During 2005, there were heavy rains in Tamil Nadu and its coastal areas were flooded. Many people were rendered homeless by flooding during November and December. Relief measures were announced by the government that necessitated collecting tokens from authorities in different centers across the city.

== Background ==
During 2005, there were heavy rains in Chennai and the surrounding areas that resulted in severe flooding. Most coastal areas of the state were flooded. Many people were rendered homeless by the floods during the months of November and December. Relief measures were announced by the government that necessitated collecting tokens from authorities in different centers across the city. The government centers were distributing ₹ 2,000, 10 kg of rice, dhotis and saris to the people affected by the floods. The relief measures were to be originally distributed from the ration shop in the area, but the street being narrow, the venue was changed to Arignar Anna Government School. On Saturday 17 December 2005, the day before the accident, 3,452 families were issued tokens, and the authorities were planning to distribute for 4,500 families on Sunday. The announcement was made with the help of public addressing system.

== The accident ==
On 18 December 2005, Sunday, around 4,500 people were gathered around the Arignar Anna Government High school in MGR Nagar where the tokens to the relief measures were about to be distributed for people under the jurisdiction of three ration shops. The people assembled from 3 a.m., while the relief was planned to be distributed at 9 a.m. There was a sudden downpour at 3:45 a.m., and there were rumours that the relief measures would be given only on first come first basis to 1,000 families. At around 4 a.m, people broke through the cordons set up by police to enter the building. There was a concrete slope at the entrance and people at the front end of the queue slipped and others stumbled over them. The gates were closed with difficulty, but by then the stampede caused 42 deaths and 37 injuries. Eyewitness claimed that the sudden downpour resulted in chaos in the area. The police were few in number to control the large crowd. They also claimed that the police controlling the crowd early during the day would have averted the situation.

== Aftermath ==
The stampede is counted among the twenty deadliest stampedes during the period of 1968–2005. The President of India, A. P. J. Abdul Kalam, condoled the death of the people who lost their lives in the tragedy. On account of the poor lighting and rain, the rescue personnel found it difficult to reach the spot. The crowd did not disperse without understanding the seriousness of the situation and only left after an announcement was made that the distribution would be made at their doors. Umbrellas, footwear and ration cards were strewn all over the place. Sixteen of the injured were admitted to the government hospital and eleven, including six women, were admitted to the Royapettah Government Hospital. The Chief Minister of Tamil Nadu, J. Jayalalithaa visited the injured in the hospital. During her interaction with the media after her hospital visit, she said that this might have been the handiwork of some of the miscreants trying to tarnish the image of the government. She stated that "There was no need for people to come in so early during the day when it had been announced that relief distribution would begin from 9 am. We had made elaborate arrangement by restricting the number of relief-seekers to 500 at each of the nine counters and deployed heavy security. It was announced that everyone would get relief,". The Tamil Nadu police said that it was raining heavily during the distribution of relief supplies. The state government also announced a compensation of ₹one lakh for all the victims and ₹ 15,000 for the injured. The leader of the Dravida Munnetra Kazhagam (DMK) party M. Karunanidhi, accused the government of buying votes by distributing freebies for the forthcoming elections. He also added that it was the poor administration of the government that resulted in the tragedy. His son, M. K. Stalin, an MLA from the DMK party, accused the government of not setting up a committee to monitor the relief measures. As a mark of respect to those who died in the accident, the shops in the area closed at 2 p.m. on the day.

== Investigation ==
The police arrested Dhanasekaran, the areas' councillor who belonged to the opposing DMK party, on 20 December 2005 on charges of spreading rumours. He was charged under IPC sections 120-B for criminal conspiracy, 147 for punishment for rioting, 304 for punishment for culpable homicide not amounting to murder, 109 for abetment, 323 for voluntarily causing hurt and 325 voluntarily causing grievous hurt. It was alleged that he and his supporters roamed around the previous evening announcing that Sunday would be the last day and token distribution would begin by 5 a.m. He argued in a lower court that he was politically targeted and the tragedy was because of an administrative failure. He quoted the transfer of Chennai collector and police officials involved in the case to support his argument. He was granted bail by the court on 26 December. He was charged in Goodas Act before the court could grant bail. He was granted bail by the Madras High Court on 5 January. The government filed a special leave petition against the order in the Supreme Court of India on 27 January 2006, but the court rejected the plea and accused the government of negligence. The court stated that "The incident occurred because of the negligence of your officers. This is not the first time that such an incident has happened in Tamil Nadu. Repeatedly, it is happening in Tamil Nadu for such petty things,". The court also noted that "The incident was because of the officers not making preparations for providing flood relief". M. Karunanidhi, in a statement, claimed that it was a moral victory for the party against the hate campaign run by Jayalalitha and her All India Anna Dravida Munnetra Kazhagam (ADMK) government. He said "The Supreme Court, which was approached by the same government, has blamed the Jayalalithaa regime for the stampede. The Supreme Court judges after hearing the two sides has said that DMK Councillor Dhanasekharan was not the reason behind the stampede, but only the Tamil Nadu Government,". The state government appointed a one-man commission under retired justice A Raman to enquire the incident. The terms of the commission were notified on 20 December 2013 by the government that instructed the commission to probe the alleged rumours, circumstances leading to the stampede, find any shortcomings of issue of tokens and ways to avoid such incidents in future. Dhanasekaran sought a stay on the proceedings of the commission quoting "Witnesses are being examined at an amazing speed, and about 35 witnesses were examined on a single day. The main aim for constituting the Commission is to divert attention on the inefficient handling of flood relief by the State Government, and to obtain a report that absolves the Government of all liability. The Commission is proceeding at such a speed that it would release a report before the coming Assembly polls on May 8".

== See also ==
- 2005 November Chennai Stampede
- 2005 Chennai floods
