= 2005 November Chennai stampede =

Crowd crush in Chennai, India

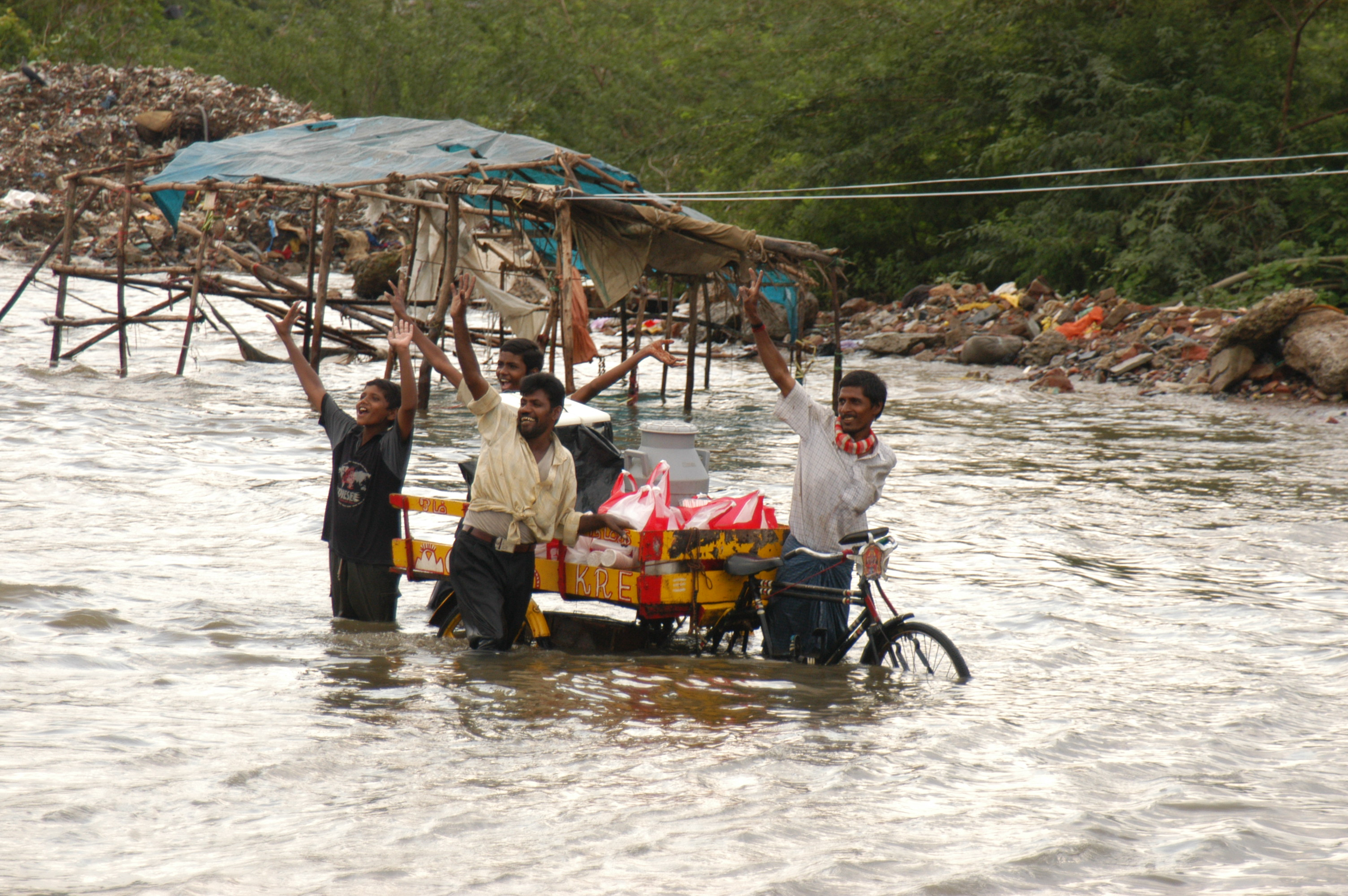
- File picture of Chennai floods in 2005
- Date: 6 November 2005
- Location: Vyasarpadi Chennai; 13°6′35″N 80°15′36″E
- Deaths: 6
- Injuries: 10

The 2005 November Chennai stampede incident happened on 6 November 2005 in a school in Vyasarpadi on the outskirts of Chennai where relief supplies were distributed by the state government for people affected by severe flooding. There were 6 deaths in the accident, which left another 12 injured. The state government announced a compensation of ₹one lakh for all the victims and ₹15,000 for the injured.

There was another similar stampede, called 2005 December Chennai stampede in KK Nagar in Chennai, killing 42 people. The two incidents drew much attention to the ruling AIADMK party government in Tamil Nadu under the Chief minister J Jayalalithaa.

== Background ==
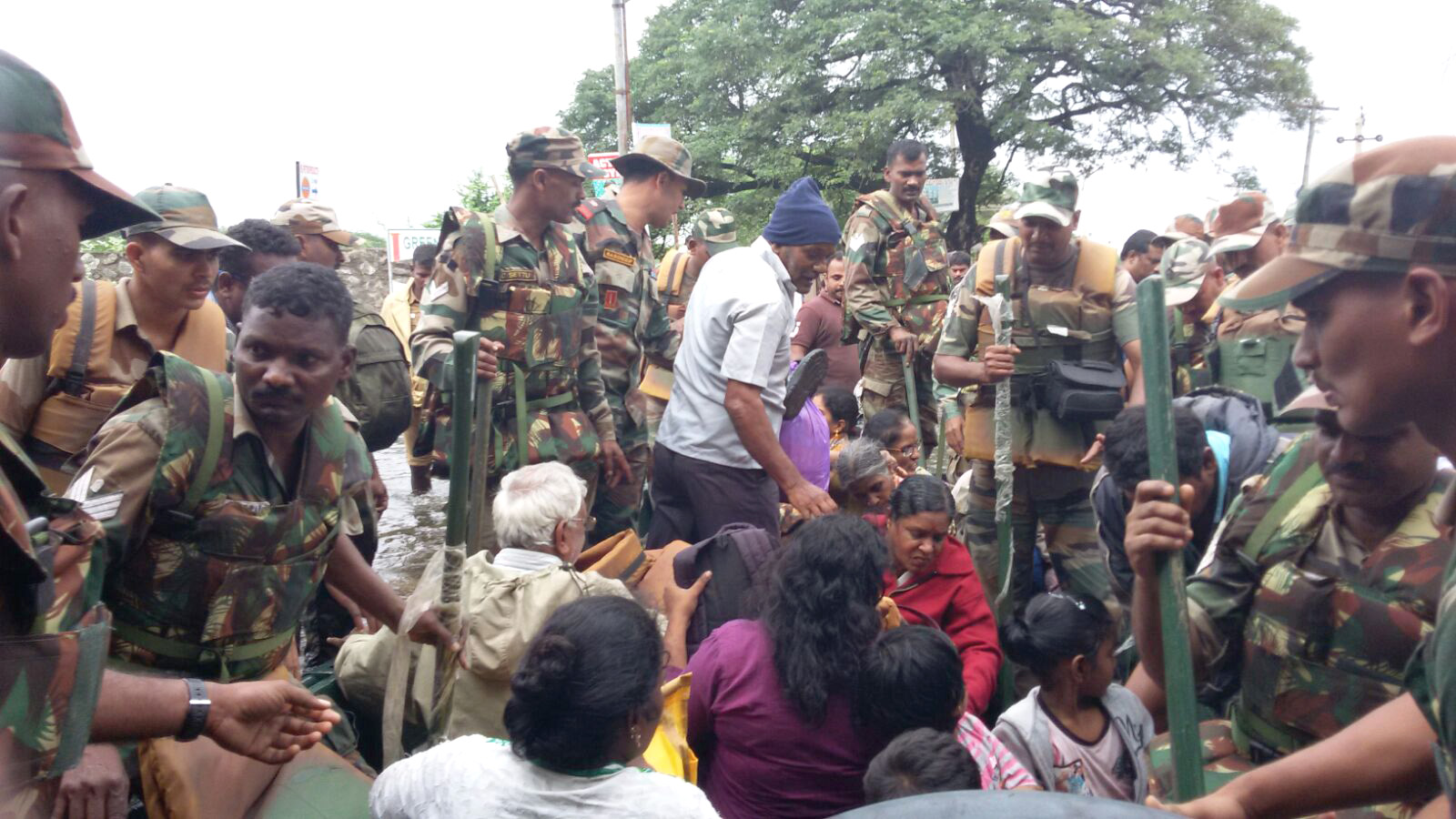

During 2005, there were heavy rains in Chennai and the surrounding areas that resulted in floods. Most coastal areas of the state were flooded. Many people were rendered homeless by the floods during the month. Relief measures were announced by the government that necessitated collecting tokens from the authorities in different centres across the city. The government centres were distributing rice, dhotis and saris to the people affected by the floods.

== The accident ==
On 6 November 2005, Sunday, around 10,000 people were gathered around the school in Vyasarpadi where the relief measures were distributed. The people were assembling from 4:30 a.m., while the distribution was planned for 9 a.m. The government were distributing ₹2,000, 10 kg of rice, dhotis and saris to the people affected by the floods. As soon as the gates were opened, people broke open leading to a stampede. The initial reports indicated 6 people were killed and 12 others were injured, while some placed it at 30.

== Aftermath ==
The then Chief Minister of Tamil Nadu, J. Jayalalithaa visited the injured in the hospital. The state government announced a compensation of one lakh (100,000) indian rupees for all the victims and ₹15,000 for the injured. There was another similar stampede, called 2005 December Chennai stampede in KK Nagar in Chennai, killing 42 people. The two incidents drew lot of attention on the ruling AIADMK party government in Tamil Nadu under the Chief Minister J Jayalalithaa. The opposition parties claimed that the accidents were avoidable and was a failure on the part ruling government. The parties were demanding the resignation of the Chief minister. The political motive and the administrative flaws were criticized by historians in the field. They showcased how, one of the six victims, being a wealthy woman owning several houses, was allowed to get the relief amount and material. The general view and the view from Supreme court of India was that the stampedes could have been avoided had there been a better organization of the distribution of flood relief and public address system to effect crowd regulation.
