= Equestrian statue of Thomas Munro =

Statue by Francis Leggatt Chantrey in Chennai, India

Coordinates: 13.075915°N 80.278827°E

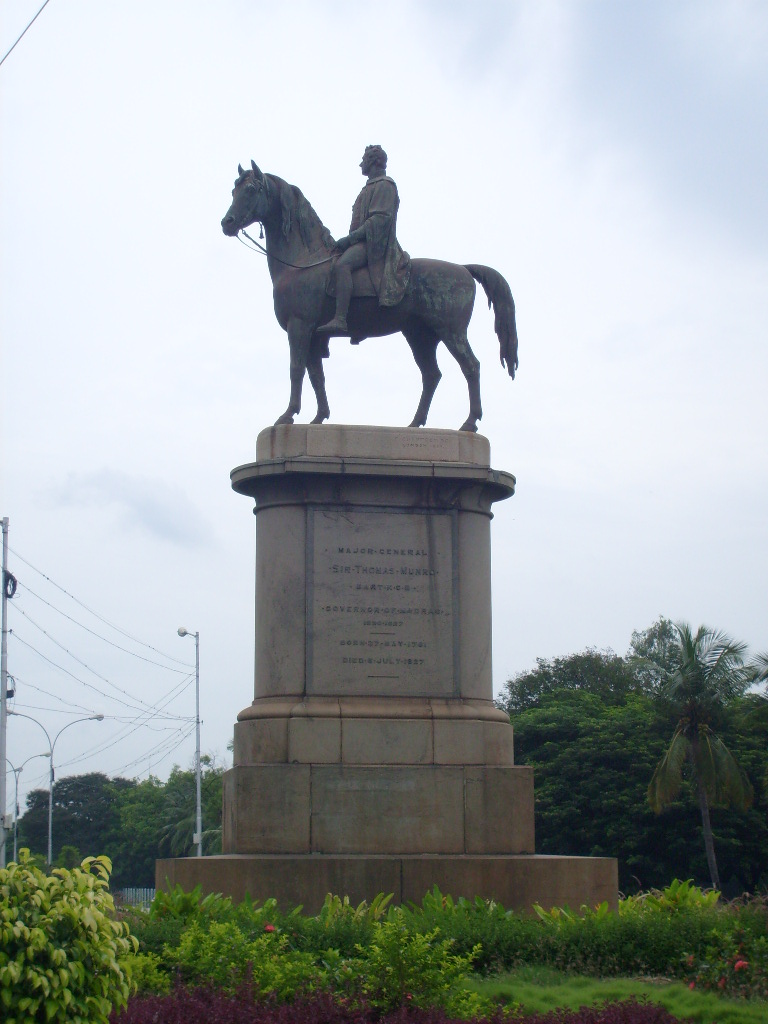
Statue of Thomas Munro in The Island, Chennai

The statue of Thomas Munro is an equestrian statue of Thomas Munro, 1st Baronet, Major-General in the British Army and Governor of Madras from 1820 to 1827, located in the city of Chennai, India. The bronze statue sculpted by Francis Chantrey in the United Kingdom in 1834 and shipped to Madras in 1839, is one of the popular landmarks in Chennai. The absence of stirrups is one of the peculiarities of the statue and for this reason, it is also referred to as "The Stirrupless Majesty".

== Thomas Munro ==
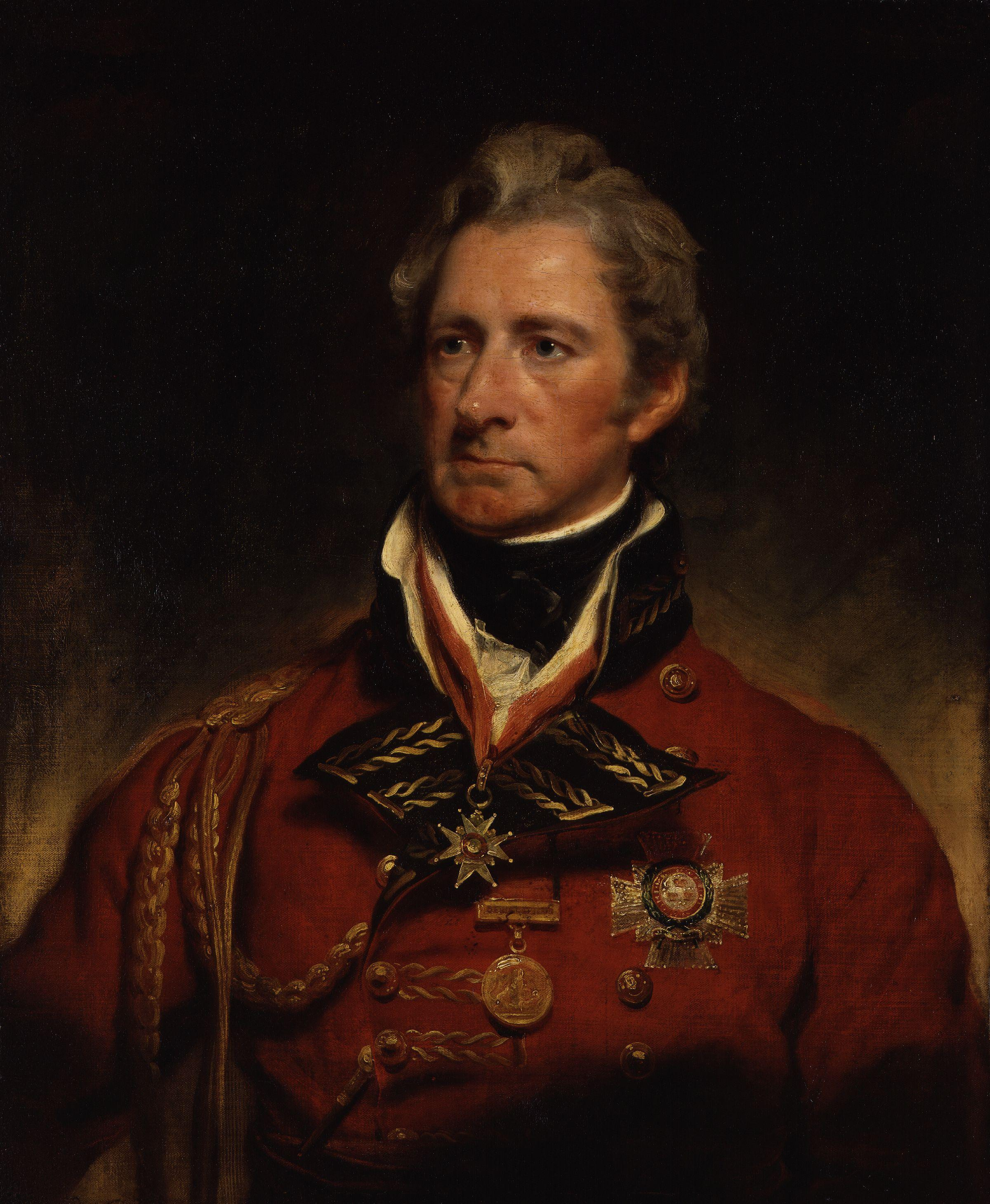
1819 portrait of Sir Thomas Munro

Thomas Munro was one of the most popular British administrators in South India. Born in Glasgow in 1761, Munro arrived in India as a soldier in 1789 and fought with distinction in the Anglo-Mysore Wars. At the end of the war, he served as a settlement officer in Canara and later, Bellary. He also fought in the Pindari War (1817). In 1820, Munro was appointed Governor of Madras and served till his death from cholera in 1827. Munro is credited with having introduced the Ryotwari System in South India and drafting an education policy for the Madras Presidency. He also supported a larger share for natives in the administration of India. Munro is the subject of a number of folk tales and ballads and is even worshipped by some.

== Death of Thomas Munro ==
Munro's term as Governor of Madras came to an end in 1826. As there was a delay in appointing a new Governor, Munro decided to visit the Ceded Districts of the Madras Presidency, where he had served as a settlement officer in the early 19th century, in the meantime. As he was riding through the hills of Cuddapah District along with a mixed retinue of Europeans and Indians, Munro observed a golden, thread-like glow across two hills. He remarked

What a beautiful garland of flowers they have stretched across the valley!

His followers were perplexed as the garland was not visible to anyone. At length, an old Indian in the retinue reportedly replied, with sorrow:

Alas! a great and good man will soon die!

After spending a few days at Ananthapur, Thomas Munro and his party reached Gooty on 4 July 1827. At Gooty, some of his men were afflicted with cholera. Two days later, at Pattikonda, Munro caught cholera from his men and had to be nursed. His condition deteriorated in the evening and he died at half-past-nine on 6 July 1827.

Munro was buried at a graveyard in Gooty. In April 1831, his remains were transported to Madras and interred in the St. Mary's Church, Fort St. George.

== Construction ==
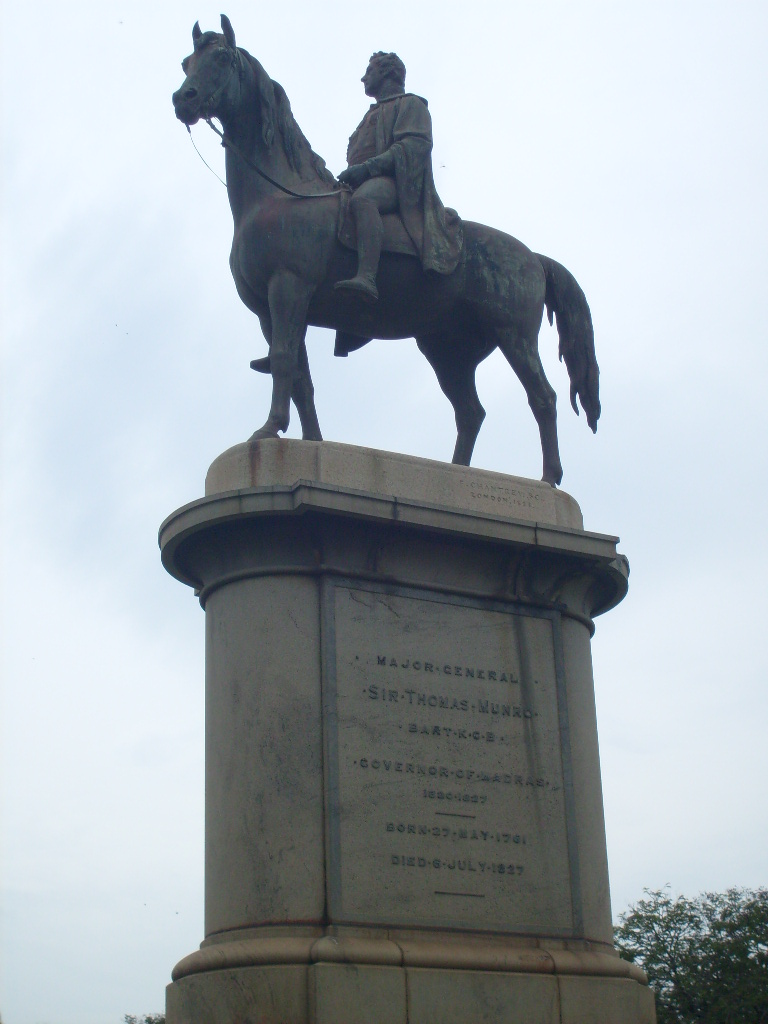
A three-dimensional view of the statue

When the news of Munro's death reached Madras, it was mourned by all classes of people in the city. The government issued a Gazette Extraordinary on 9 July 1827 with the message:

His sound and vigorous understanding, his transcendent talents, his indefatigable application, his varied stores of knowledge, his attainments as an Oriental scholar, his intimate acquaintance with the habits and feelings of native soldiers and inhabitants generally, his patience, temper and facility of access, and kindness of manner would have ensured him distinction in any line of employment. These qualities were admirably adapted to the duties which he had to perform in organizing the resources, and establishing the tranquility of those provinces where his latest breath has been drawn, and where he has long been known with the appellation of the Father of the People

A public meeting was soon held in his memory in Madras city in which was made a proposal to erect a statue to Munro through public subscription. The Madras government opened a memorial for Munro in the town of Pattikonda where he had died. A choultry called "Munro Choultry" was erected in Gooty in his honour.

A total of nine thousand pounds (£8000, according to some sources) were collected through public subscription and the British sculptor Francis Chantrey was commissioned to make the statue. Chantrey completed the statue in 1834 - one of the three equestrian statues sculpted by him. According to a popular belief, the Duke of Wellington, on seeing the completed statue, had exclaimed

A very fine horse; a very fine statue, and a very extraordinary man

The statue, weighing six tonnes, was shipped to India in three parts and erected at The Island, Chennai in 1839 atop a granite plinth made by Ostheider & Co of Calcutta. The statue was ceremonially opened on 23 October 1839.

== Architecture ==
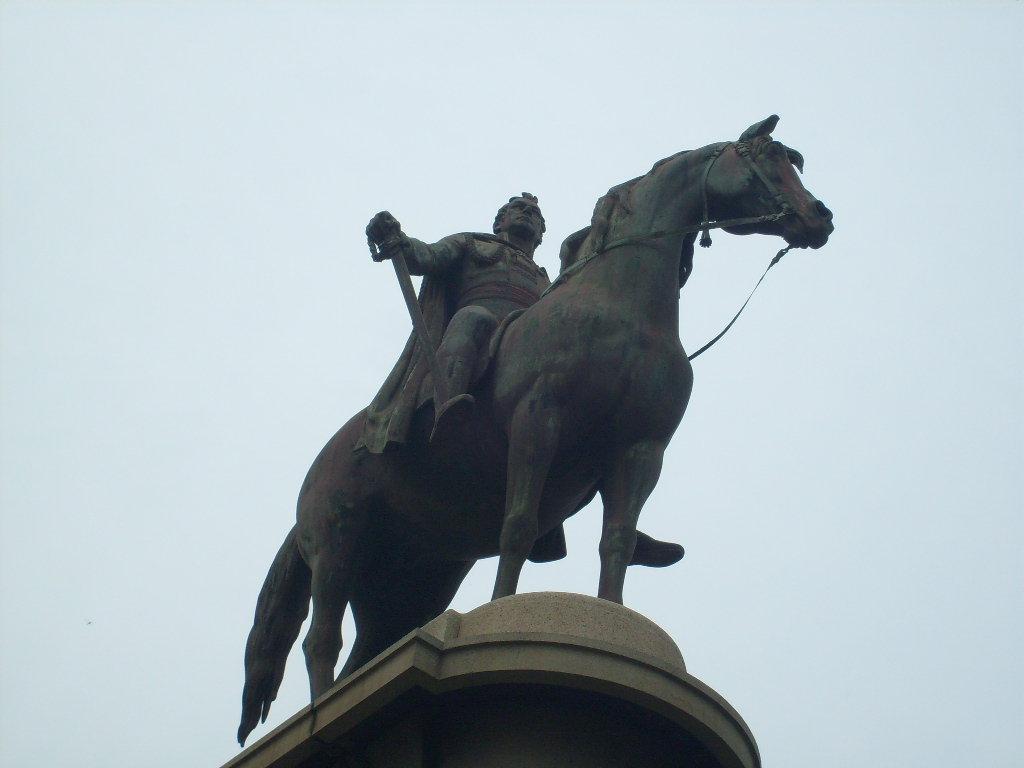
Thomas Munro and his horse

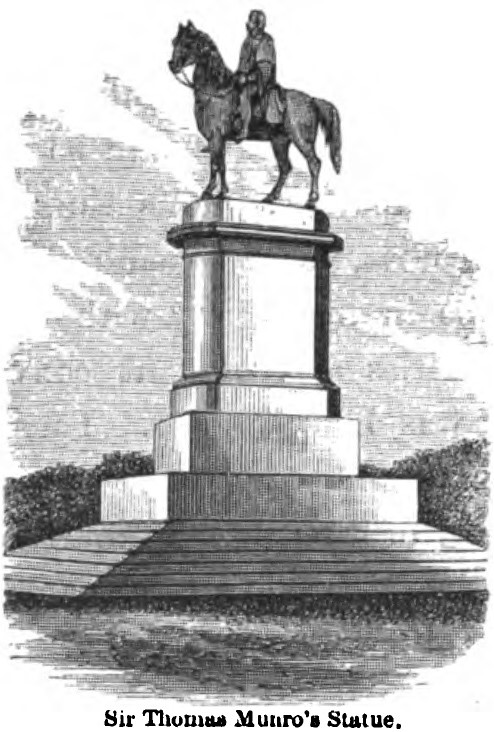
Sir. Thomas Munro's Statue, Madras (MacLeod, p.124, 1871)

The statue depicts Thomas Munro riding a horse. In doing so, Chantrey had opted to follow, for commemorative purposes, the prevalent Western practice of portraying authority. It is believed that Chantrey might have modelled the statue upon his own earlier work of George IV at Trafalgar Square, London. This might have been intended to elevate Munro above the Indians whose cause he championed. Chantrey was, initially, caught in a dilemma over the choice of steed. While some of his friends and visitors suggested a classic horse, some suggested an Arabian, others a war horse. Eventually, Chantrey chose an Arab, similar to the one he had sculpted for his statue of George IV. One particular biography of Francis Chantrey considered the sculpture of Thomas Munro to be the finest among Chantrey's works and the horse, his worst ever.

The combined height of the horse and the rider is more than 15 feet. The horse gazes calmly while Munro strikes a thoughtful pose, both still, yet ready to lunge forward into motion.

== Peculiarity ==
The peculiarity of the statue is the absence of a saddle as well as the stirrups. While some feel that the omission is due to an oversight on the part of the sculptor, others feel that the saddle and the stirrups might have been deliberately excluded keeping in mind Munro's penchant for bareback riding. Due to the absence of stirrups, the statue is also occasionally referred to as "The Stirrupless Majesty". In fact, their absence appears to be a deliberate choice on the part of the sculptor; Chantrey's Equestrian statues of King George IV and the Duke of Wellington in London are similarly bareback and stirrupless.

== Historical references ==
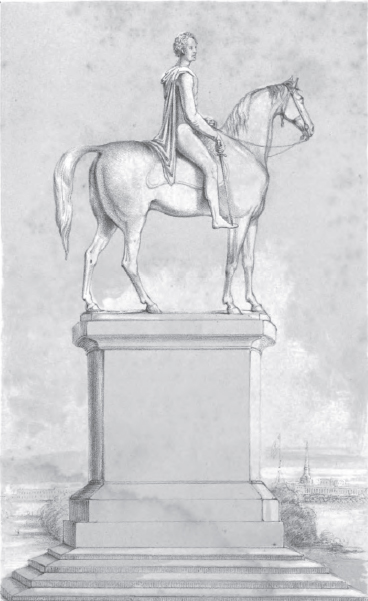
An 1843 illustration of Munro's statue

Captain Hervey has been credited with popularizing an anecdote connected with Munro's statue

... I was one day driving by the monument when I saw an old man in a red coat, with three chevrons on his right arm. standing leaning on his staff, and gazing silently on the exalted statue. He was evidently an old pensioner, not only from his dress, but from a certain degree of military carriage in his tout ensemble, which there was no mistaking. Out of curiosity I stopped my buggy, got out, and addressed the veteran. "What are you looking at, my fine old fellow?", enquired I. "Do you know who that is intended to represent?" "Who can have known the great Sir Thomas Munro?", replied the old man, "without remembering him? And who can have known him without loving him? And how can I, who had served under him for many years, ever forget him?"

"Then you think that is a good likeness of our Governor-you recognize the face?" asked I.

"Yes sir", said he. "It is a good likeness, but we shall never again see any like him. He was indeed the friend of the Indian, whether a sepoy or a ryot at the plough. And Madras will never again have a Governor like him." And raising his hand to the head, he gave the old-fashioned salute, lifted up his bundle and walked off, mumbling to himself about the impropriety of crows being allowed to build nests on the top, and to dirt over the head of the greatest man of his age.

== Proposed removal ==
During the World Classical Tamil Conference held in Coimbatore in 2010, there were demands to remove the statue of Thomas Munro, evoking strong protests from conservationists. Though the government had arrived at a decision to remove the statue, it has not yet been implemented.

== Sources ==
- Jones, George (1849). Sir Francis Chantrey, recollections. Oxford University.
