= Tiruvirkolam =

- town
- Location in Tamil Nadu, India
- Coordinates: 13.0122°N 79.8149°E
- Country: India
- State: Tamil Nadu
- District: Thiruvallur

Languages
  - Official: Tamil
- Time zone: UTC+5:30 (IST)
- Nearest city: Chennai

Tiruvirkolam (also Thiruvirkolam or Koovam or Coovum or Cooum) is an ancient temple town on the banks of the Koovam River in Tamil Nadu, India. It is located about 70 km from Chennai. The water, though sparkling clear over here, becomes polluted on the way and reaches the Bay of Bengal.

== Landmarks ==
Sri Tripuranthaka Swami temple has God Shiva as the principal deity.
