= Napier Bridge =

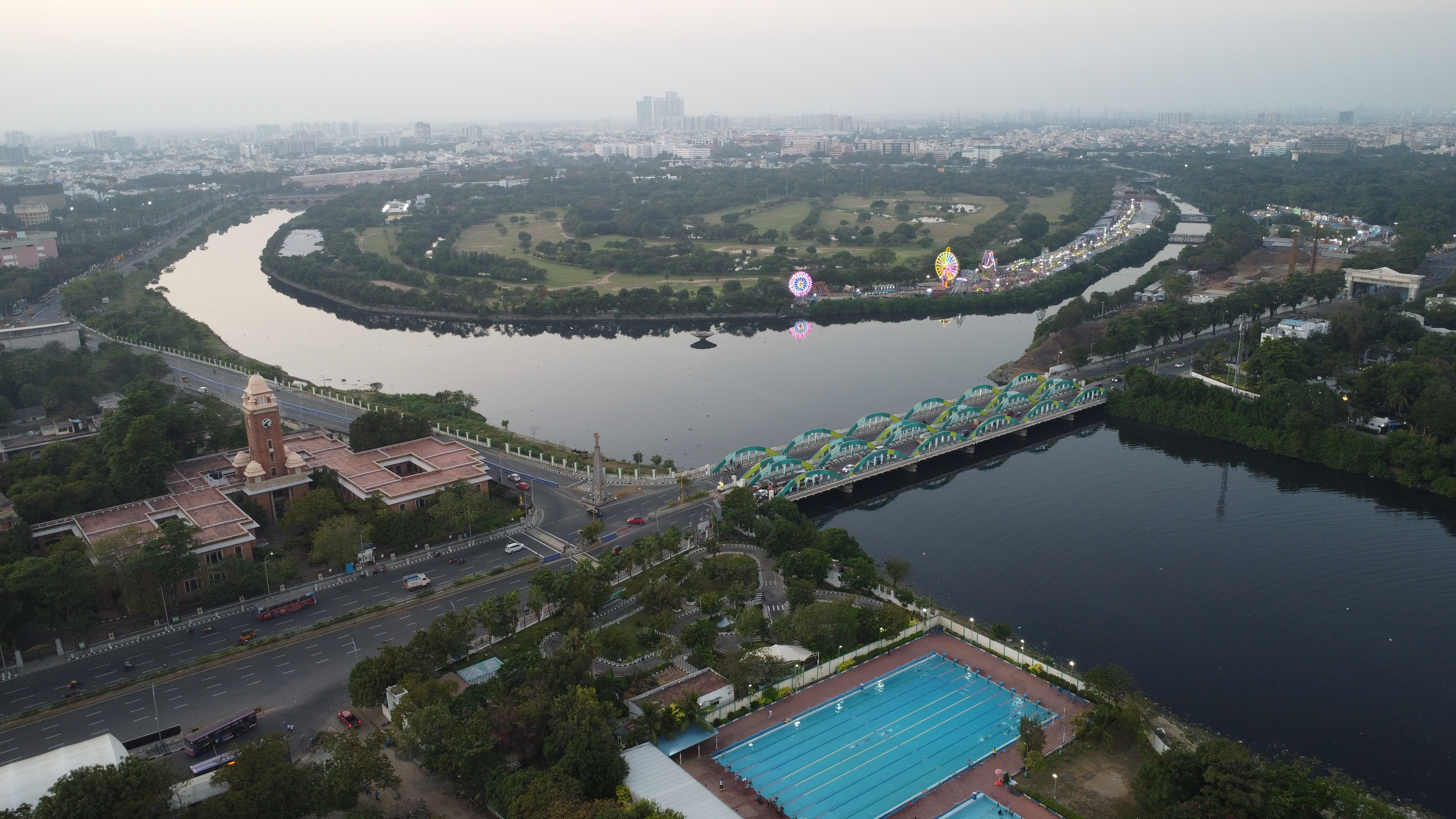
- Napier bridge across the Cooum River
- Coordinates: 13.0688°N 80.2845°E
- Carries: 6 lanes of traffic
- Crosses: Cooum river
- Locale: Chennai, Tamil Nadu, India

Characteristics
- Material: Concrete
- Longest span: 138 m (453 ft)

History
- Opened: 1869; 157 years ago (original bridge); 1944; 82 years ago (concrete bridge); 1999; 27 years ago (appended)

Location
- Interactive map of Napier Bridge

Napier Bridge is a road bridge over the Coovum River in Chennai, India. It connects Fort St. George with the Marina Beach, and is one of the historic structures and landmarks of the city. The first iron bridge was built in 1869, which was rebuilt further in 1909 and 1944. A new concrete bridge was added to the west of the original bridge in 1999 to handle additional lanes of traffic.

== History ==
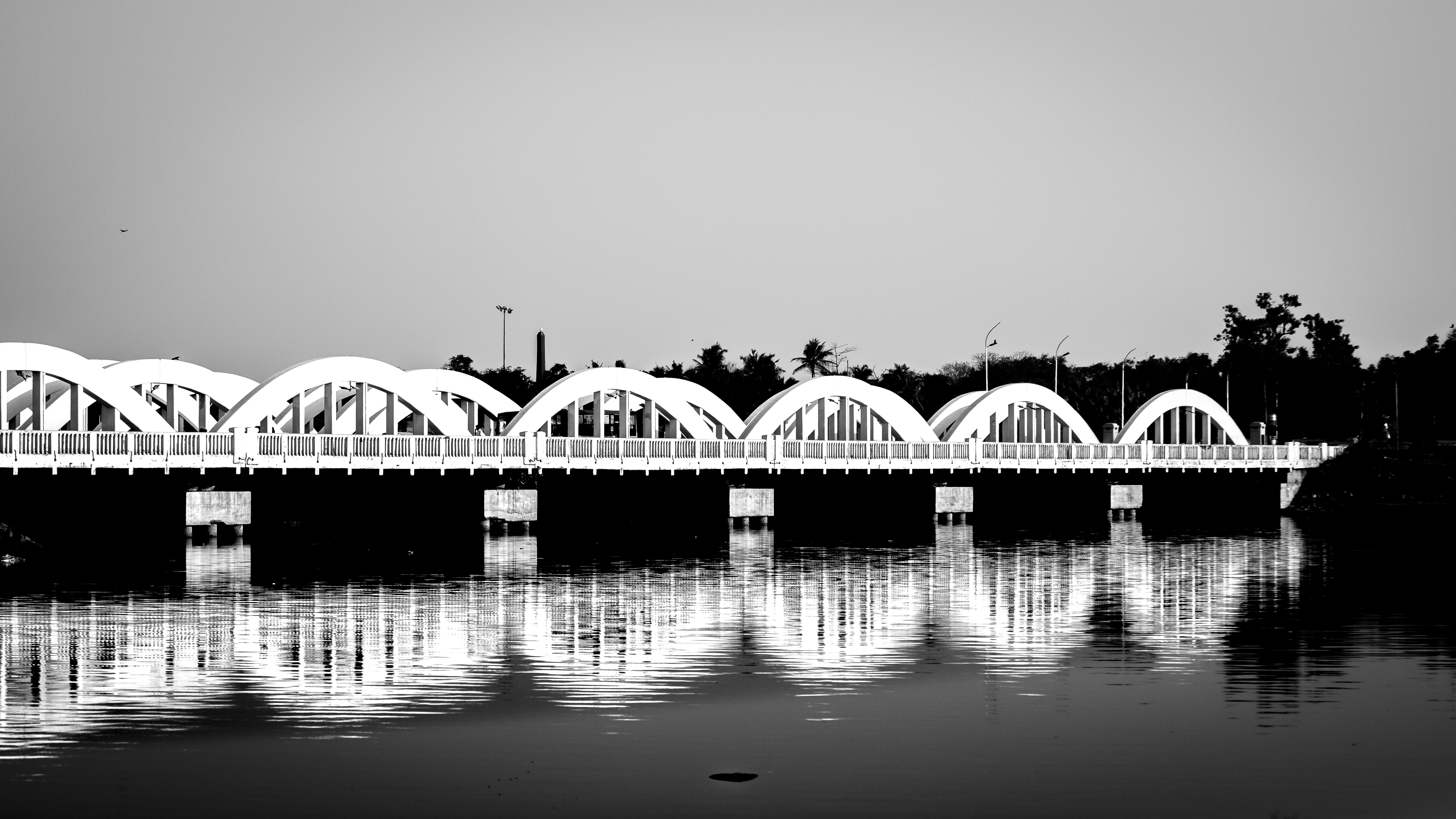
The concrete bridge built in 1944

In 1868, Francis Napier, then Governor of Madras, planned to build a bridge across the mouth of the Cooum River. The cast iron lattice bridge was built in 1869, and connected the Fort St. George in northern Madras with the other side of the city. However, due to corrosion, the bridge had to be replaced by a new bridge with large iron girders in 1909. The new bridge was prone to lightning strikes, which led to the installation of a lightning rod later. The iron bridge became weaker towards the end of the 1930s, and plans were made to construct a new bridge at a cost of ₹0.15 million (equivalent to ₹49 million or US$500,000 in 2023).

The new bridge was built with pre-stressed concrete and was the first such bridge to be built in India. It was built by Gannon Dunkerley, and the construction was supervised by the Madras Port Trust. The construction involved the utilization of 240 tonnes of steel and 500 tonnes of cement. The bridge was opened for traffic in 1944. In 1999, a new bridge was added to the western side of the existing bridge.

== Design ==
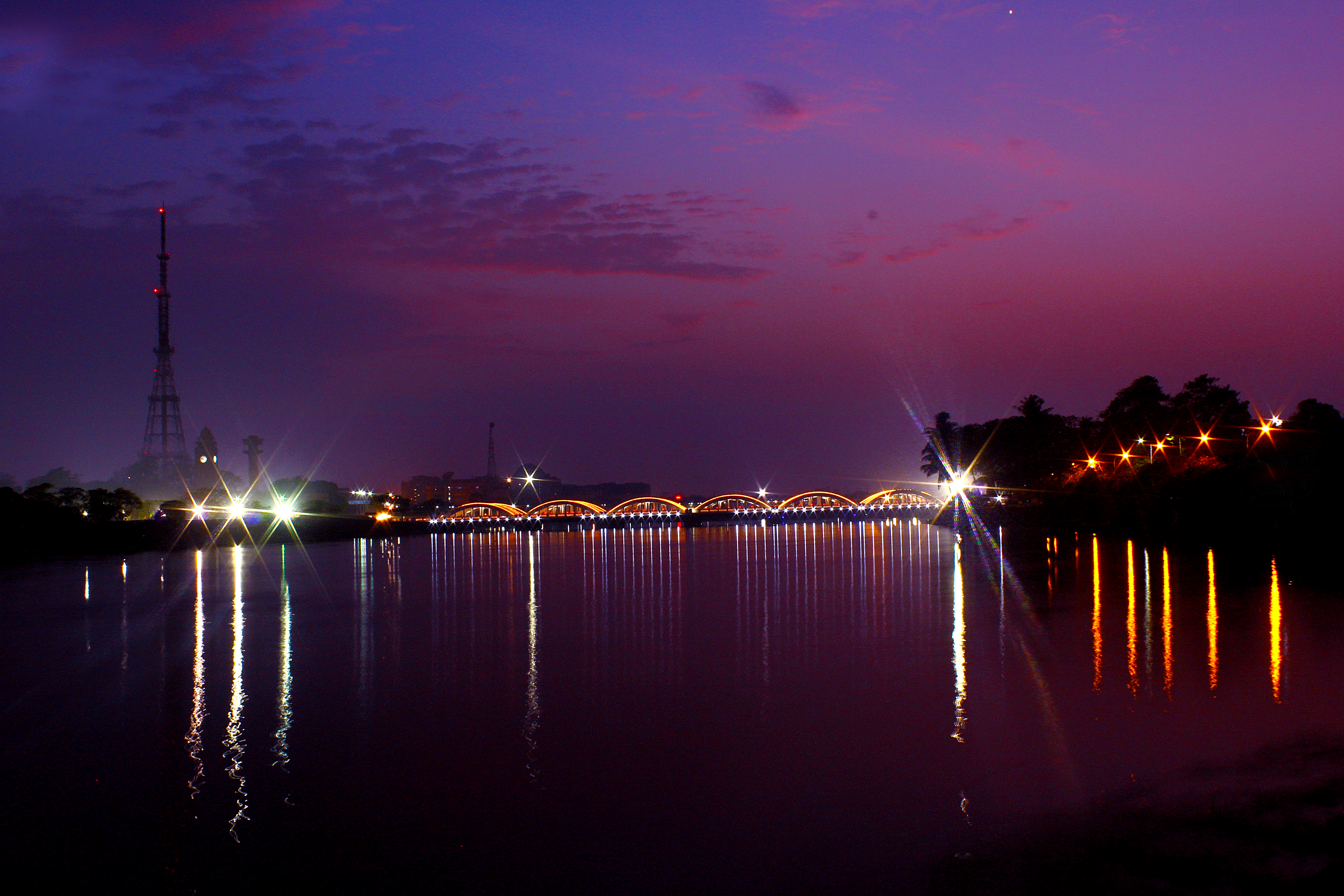
Illuminated Napier Bridge at night

The newly built western carriageway is 10.5 m (34 ft)-wide with the original eastern side carriageway measuring 9.75 m (32.0 ft) in width, and 2 m (6 ft 7 in) wide footpaths. The bridge is 138 m (453 ft) long consisting of six spans with bowstring arches on either side across the mouth of the Cooum river. The bridge was painted white, which was maintained till the early 2020s.

In 2010, the bridge was illuminated by 464 LED bulbs at a cost of ₹16.2 million (equivalent to ₹36 million or US$380,000 in 2023). The lighting was done by Sydney-based firm LDP Lighting and it was designed to give an illusion of a floating bridge in the night. In 2020, the lighting was upgraded to a dynamic lighting system. In 2022, the bridge was painted in a checkered pattern similar to a chessboard ahead of the 44th Chess Olympiad held in Chennai. The artwork drew mixed reaction from the people, being praised by some while others raised concerns that the pattern was disorienting.

== See also ==
- Architecture of Chennai
- Heritage structures in Chennai
