= Indian mulberry =

Indian mulberry may refer to:

- Morinda citrifolia, widely distributed tropically and may be used as a food source
- Morinda tinctoria, native to southern Asia and cultivated as a dye source

== See also ==
- List of plants known as mulberry
