= Chinese mulberry =

Chinese mulberry is a common name for several trees and may refer to:

- Morus, the mulberry genus, with several species widely cultivated in China for production of fruit and silk
  - Morus alba, the most commonly cultivated mulberry in China, and the preferred feed for silkworms
  - Morus australis, cultivated in China and native to southeast Asia
  - Morus multicaulis, now classified as a variety of Morus alba
- Maclura tricuspidata, native to East Asia and related to the mulberries of the genus Morus, which produces similar edible fruits

== See also ==
- List of plants known as mulberry
