= List of plants known as mulberry =

Mulberry generally refers to various deciduous trees in the eudicot genus Morus, especially:

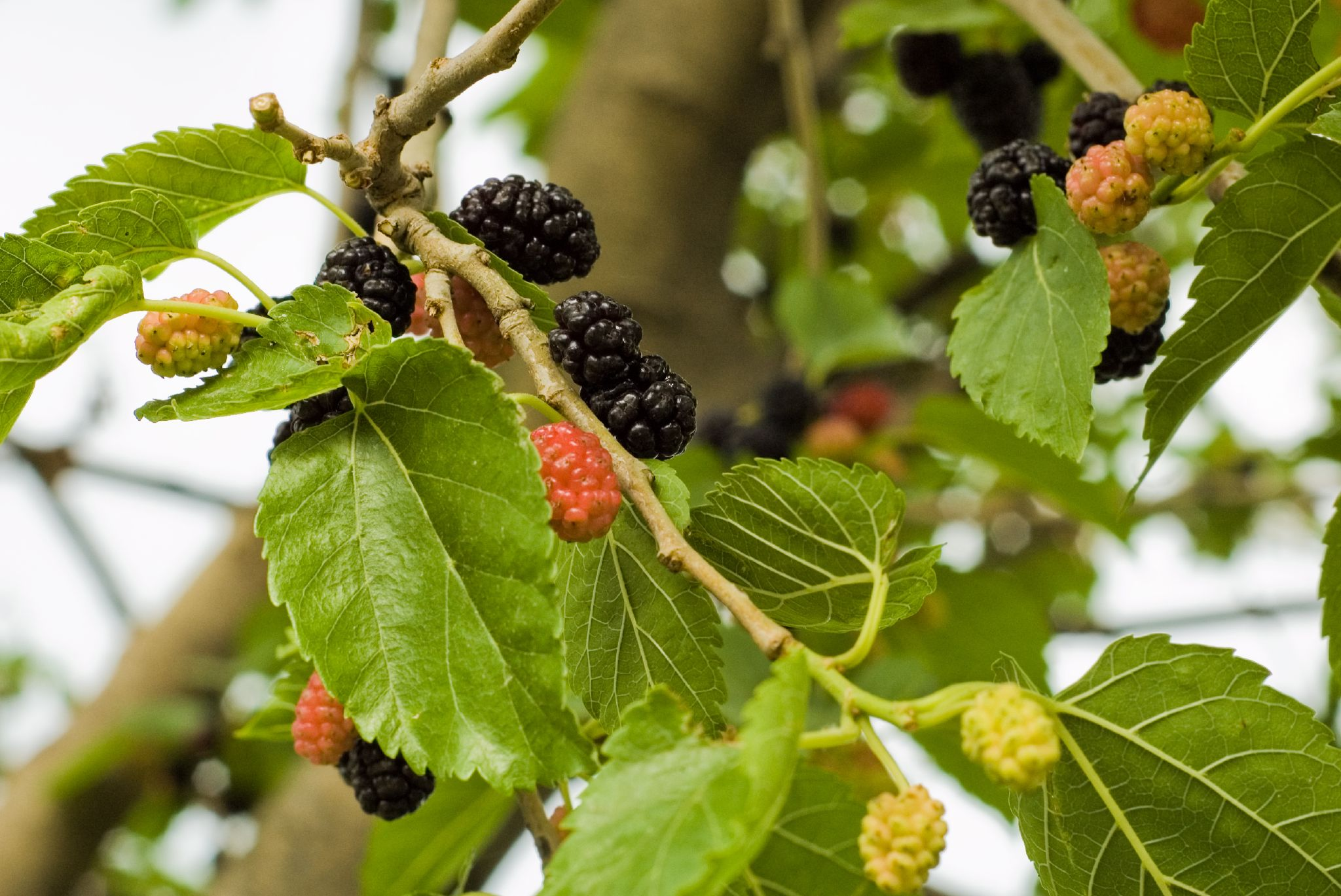
White mulberry fruit often turn black when ripe

- Morus alba, white mulberry
- Morus nigra, black mulberry
- Morus rubra, red mulberry
- Morus serrata, Himalayan mulberry

Mulberry is also part of the common names of several other plants.

- In the mulberry and fig family Moraceae:
  - African mulberry, formerly Morus mesozygia, now in monotypic genus Afromorus
  - Chinese mulberry, used for Maclura tricuspidata, as well as for Morus albus, its variety multicaulis, and Morus australis
  - Fig-mulberry, Ficus sycomorus
  - Paper mulberry (Broussonetia papyrifera, syn. Morus papyrifera)
- Indian mulberry, two species in genus Morinda from the coffee family, eudicots not closely related to Moraceae
- "Native mulberry" of Australia:
  - Hedycarya angustifolia, also "Australian mulberry", from the Monimiaceae family, a magnoliid lineage related to laurel
  - Pipturus argenteus, in Australia also "white mulberry", from the nettle family, closely related to the Moraceae
