= 2005 Chennai floods =

Flood in India

The 2005 Chennai floods were some of the worst floods to have hit the city of Chennai, India. The floods occurred during the North-East monsoon season (November-December 2005) as a result of heavy rain. Over 50 people were killed in two incidents of stampede for food and money in relief camps. The Chennai flood damaged many houses leaving people on the streets.

== See also ==
- 2005 December Chennai Stampede
- 2005 November Chennai Stampede
- Disaster Management Act, 2005
- 2015 South Indian floods
- 2023 Chennai floods
