= The Island, Chennai =

River island on the Cooum River in Chennai, Tamil Nadu, India

- Island Grounds
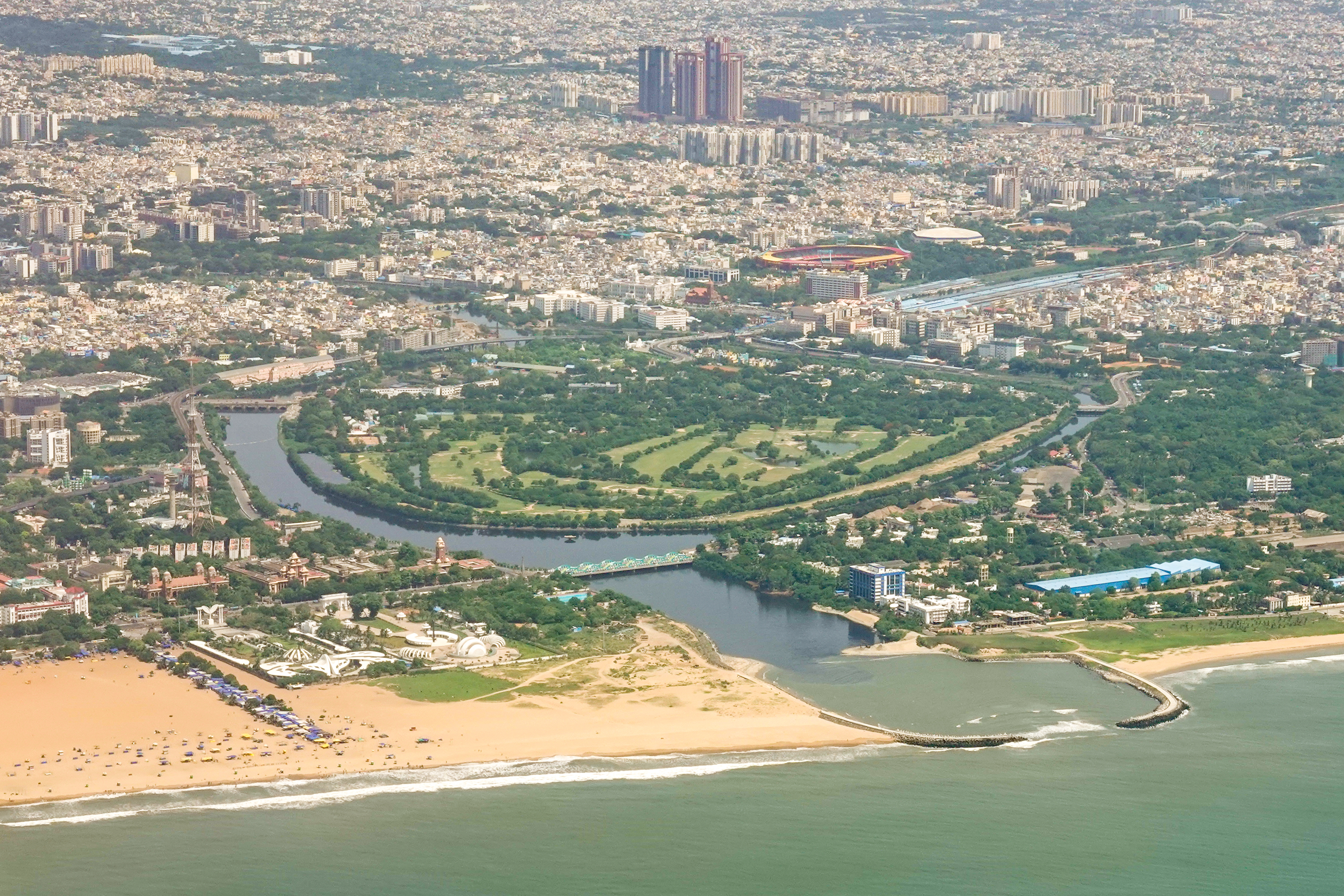
- Aerial view of The Island, Chennai

- The Island Grounds, Chennai, Tamil Nadu
- Location: Park Town, Chennai, Tamil Nadu - 600003
- Coordinates: 13.0728°N 80.2807°E
- Elevation: 48 m (157 ft)
- Public transit: Chennai Metropolitan Transport Corporation

The Island is a river island situated on the Cooum River in the northern part of the Indian city of Chennai. The island was created artificially in the early 19th century by merging the Coovum River with the then "Elambore River". An equestrian statue of Sir Thomas Munro, popularly known as "His Stirrupless Majesty", is located on the island. The Madras Gymkhana Club and Pallavan Illam, the headquarters of the Metropolitan Transport Corporation (MTC), Chennai are also located here. The Island Grounds constitute a vast empty space on the island where fairs and exhibitions are held.

Anna Salai, one of the arterial roads of Chennai, originates on this island, running mostly in the southwest direction towards the south. The Kilometer Zero of Chennai is located at the midpoint of Muthuswamy Bridge on the Muthuswamy Road on the northern side of The Island.

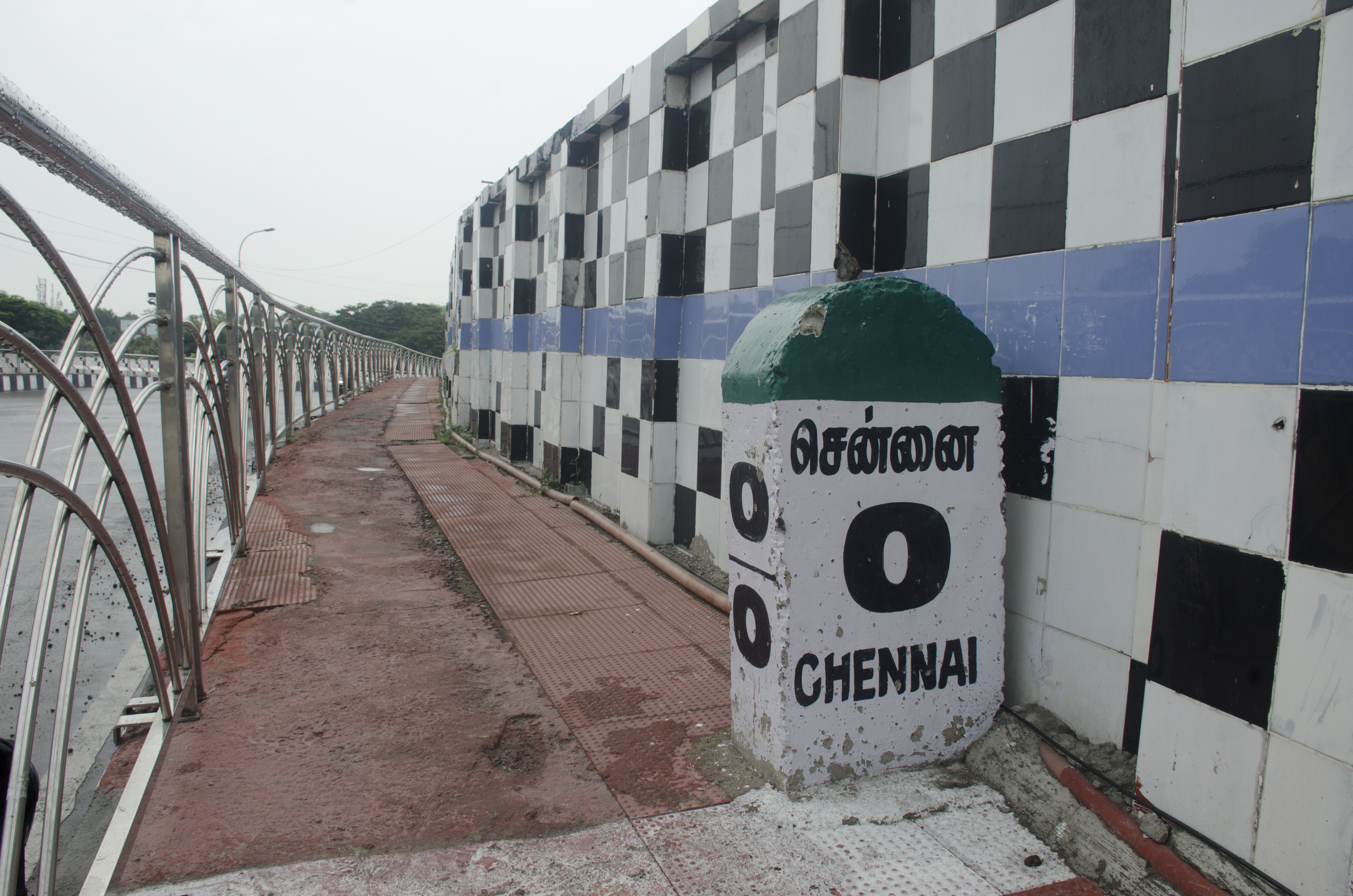
The Kilometer Zero milestone in Chennai is situated on the Island

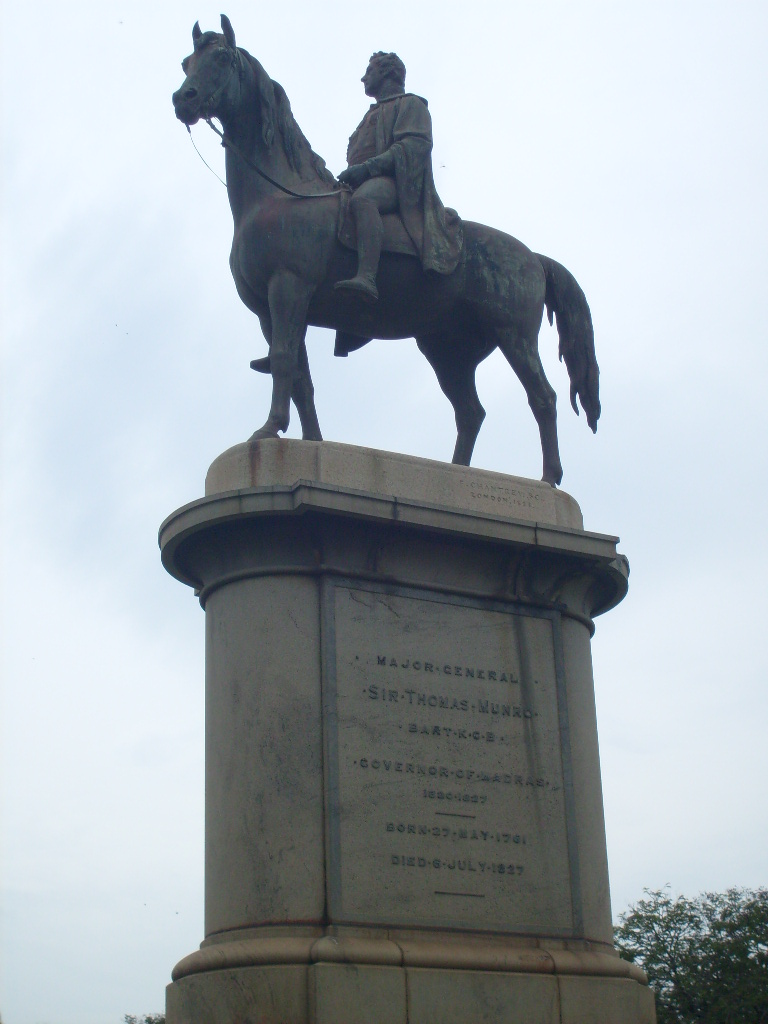
Statue of Thomas Munro, 1st Baronet in The Island

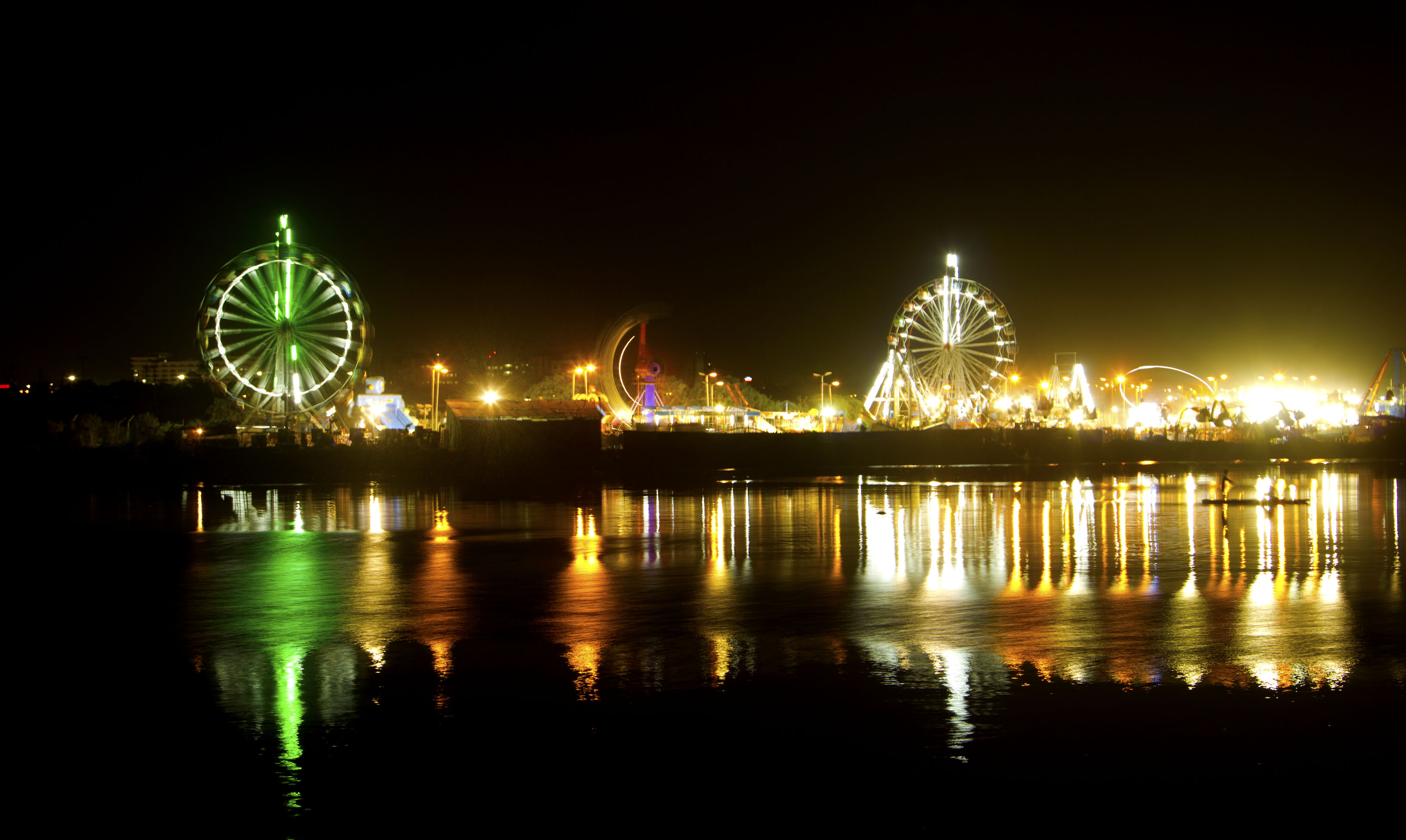
The Island Grounds annual fair at night

Since 1975, the annual India Tourist and Industrial Fair, popularly known to the locals as the trade fair, has been conducted on this island by the state government during the months of January to March.

The Chennai Formula Racing Circuit hosted the F4 Indian Championship and the Indian Racing League in 2024.
