= Chitlapakkam =

- Neighbourhood
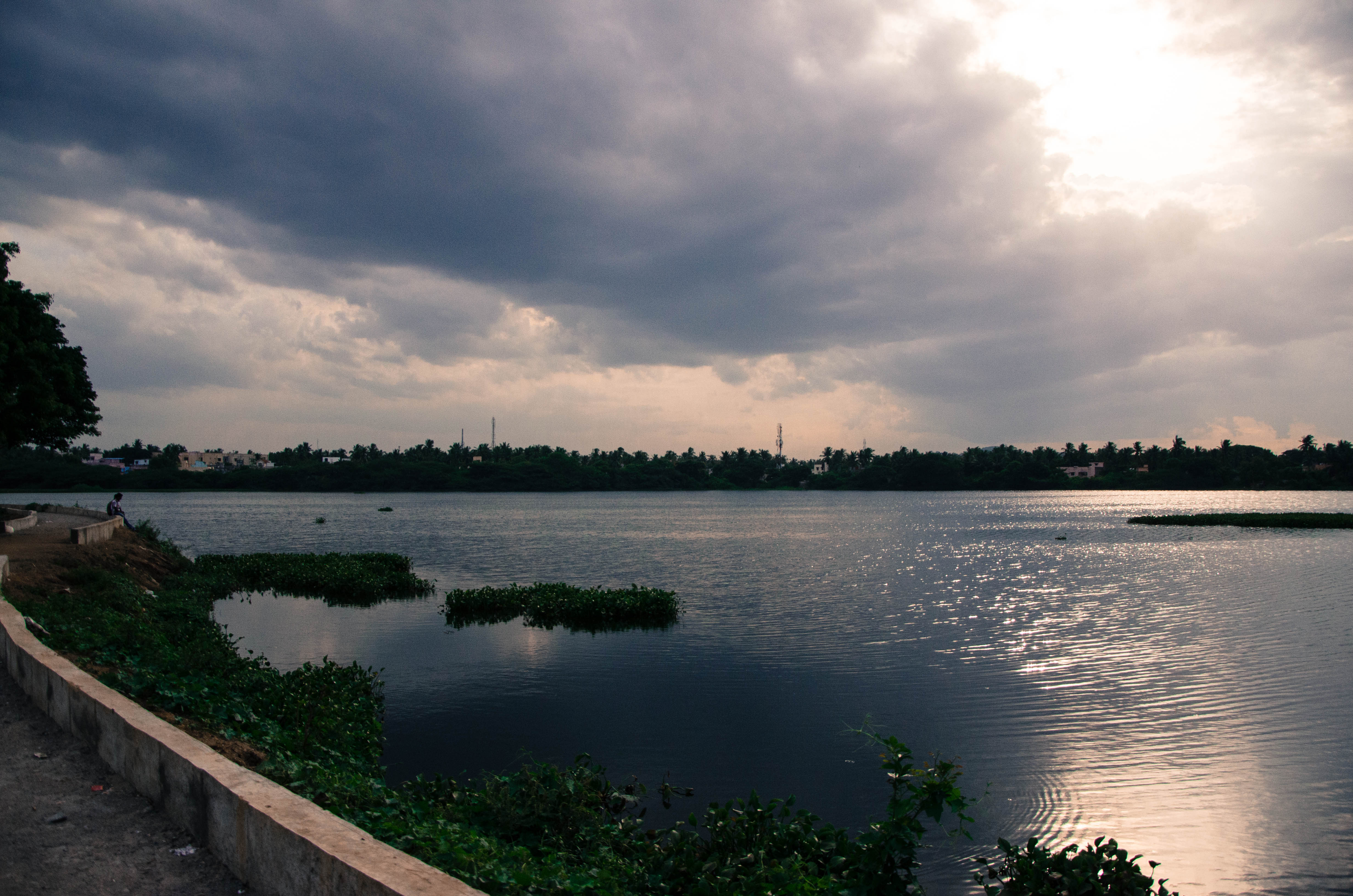
- Chitlapakkam Lake

- Location in Chennai Metropolitan Area Location in Tamil Nadu Location in India
- Coordinates: 12°56′13.2″N 80°08′20.0″E
- Country: India
- State: Tamil Nadu
- Metro: Chennai Metropolitan Area
- District: Chengalpattu
- City: Tambaram

Government
  - MP: T.R. Baalu (DMK)
  - MLA: S.R.Raja (DMK)
  - Corporation Commissioner: R. Alagumeena IAS
  - Mayor: K. Vasanthakumari (DMK)
  - Deputy Mayor: G. Kamaraj (DMK)

Area
  - Total: 2.95 km^{2} (1.14 sq mi)
- Elevation: 36.71 m (120.4 ft)

Population (2011)
  - Total: 37,987
  - Density: 12,900/km^{2} (33,400/sq mi)

Languages
  - Official: Tamil
  - Additional official: English
- Time zone: UTC+5:30 (IST)
- PIN: 600064
- Vehicle Registration: TN 11
- Law enforcement agency: Tambaram City Police
- Urban planning agency: Chennai Metropolitan Development Authority

Chitlapakkam is a residential locality located in Chennai Metropolitan Area governed by the Tambaram City Municipal Corporation. It is well known for its small, perennial lake and adjoining ecosystems.

== Overview ==
Chitlapakkam is a fast-developing area, located about 7 km south from the Chennai International Airport. Its area is 2.95 km^{2} and population density is 8,581 per square kilometers (as of 2001). The neighbourhood is served by Tambaram Sanatorium railway station, which is 100 m from the locality and 200 meters from Chitlapakkam lake and govt school. Major suburbs neighbouring areas include Pallavaram, Chromepet, Selaiyur, Tambaram Sanatorium, and Tambaram.

The Kumaran Kundram temple of Lord Muruga is a 15-minute walk from Chitlapakkam.

Chitlapakkam lake has water almost all throughout the year; there are plans to modernize it with boating facilities.

Chitlappakkam and Sithalapakkam are frequently confused, as both are suburbs of Tambaram. Chitlappakkam is the more developed and well-established suburb.

Chitlapakkam is a fast-developing part of the city, and many people from Other places have relocated there because of its green environment, water availability, proximity to OMR and to MEPZ and GST Road. With advent of mini buses connecting Chitlapakkam to Chrompet and to Tambaram and Tambaram Sanatorium railway stations and also due to introduction of share autos connectivity and access has dramatically improved. There is a government bus No 52 D which operates 2 services from the chitlapakkam pond to Parrys Corner at 11 am and also at 4 pm daily. This bus stand near Chitlapakkam water tank is 75 years old. Similarly mini bus No S3 connects Chitlapakkam to Chrompet while bus No S8 connects it to Tambaram.

Village details
Area	2.95 sq km
Population	37,906
Total roads	315
Wells	10
Overhead tanks	2
Water storage tanks	3
Hand pumps	33
Small culverts	80

== Lake ==
The Chitlapakkam lake, coordinates 12°56'2"N 80°8'10"E, measuring 50 acre is the chief water body in the neighbourhood. Earlier, Chilapakkam was a main agricultural area. Pachamalai hill used to serve as a source for the Chitlapakkam lake. This lake water was used for irrigation before urbanization.

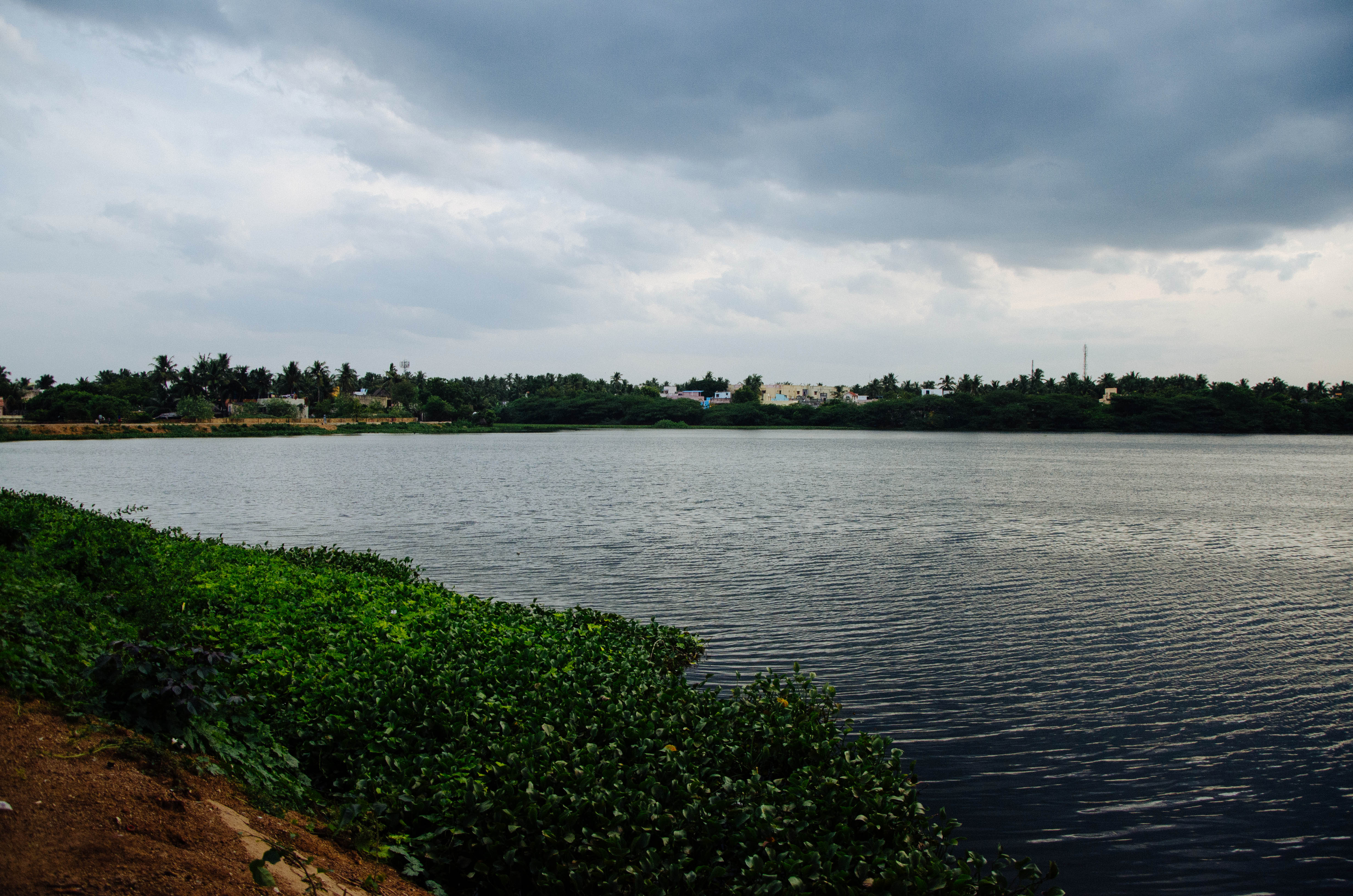
Water level in Chitlapakkam lake

Because of the presence of lake, the water table level is higher compared with many other areas in Chennai. The level of water table in this area is 2.50–8 m, and the level of TDS is 400–900 ppm.

According to a report submitted to the Kancheepuram district administration, improvement work on the lake would require an estimated ₹ 4.5 million for the improvement of the lake. The public has funded ₹ 1.5 million and the state government is funding ₹ 3 million.

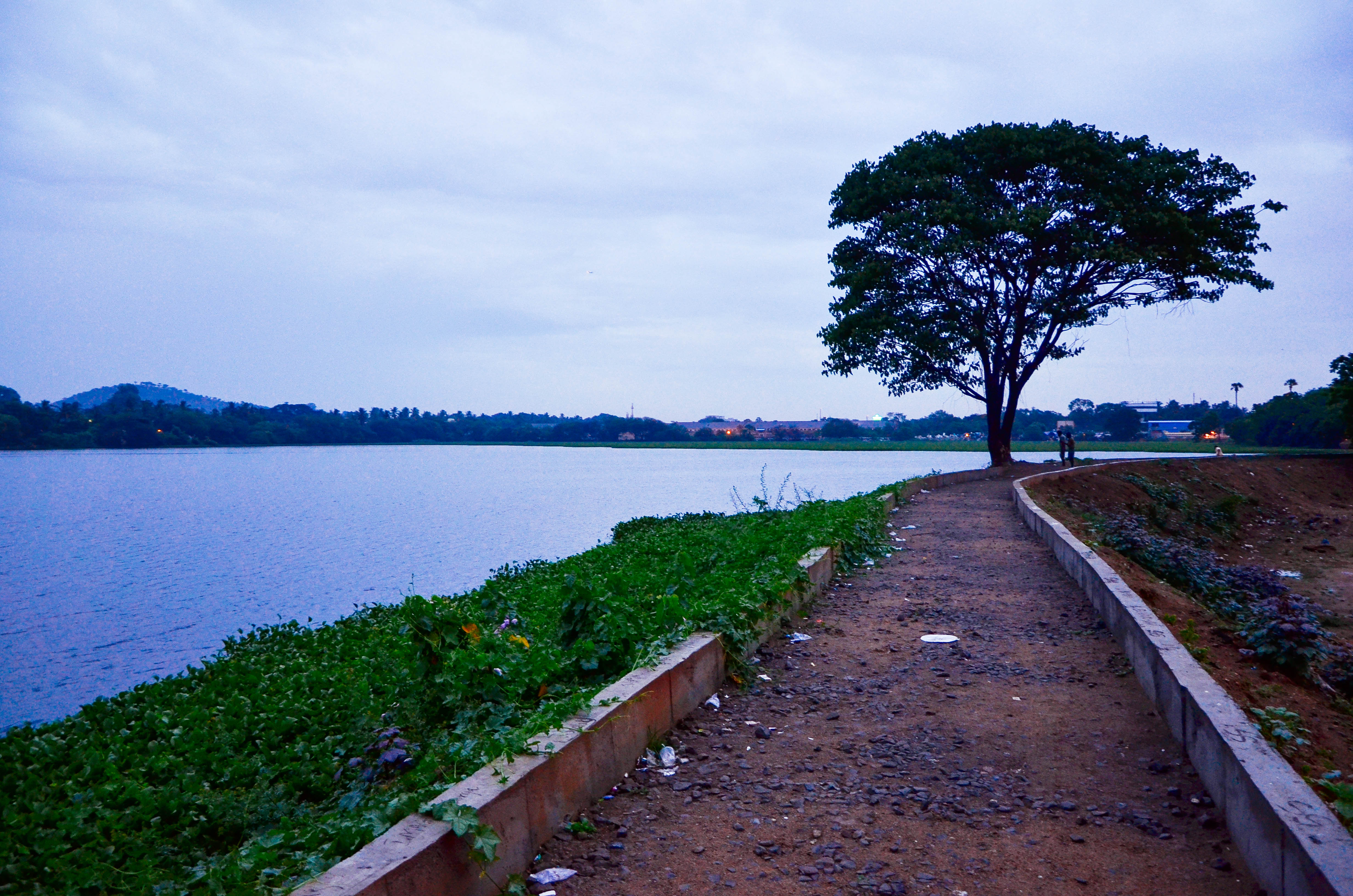
Newly laid pathway around Chitlapakkam lake

On 10 February 2013, work to build a 750-m pathway around the lake, at the cost of ₹ 4.5 million, commenced. It is proposed that the lake will be used for boating and a garden will be maintained around.

Over the years several attempts were made to encroach the Chitlapakkam Lake. Encroachments on the east by religious buildings, Government buildings on the northern side has reduced the actual size of the lake by many folds. Attempts by local welfare associations and watchdog movements had contributed to slowing down the pace of encroachments. Litigations pending in Madras High Court could recover some more extent of the lost lake.

Recent attempts by resident welfare associations and organizations such as Chitlapakkam Rising, has helped mandate the local panchayat to take initiatives to move the garbage dumpyard which was occupying almost 3+ acres of lake area. In 2018, several protests organized by local organizations, significantly raised the significance of protecting the lake among authorities.

== Demographics ==
As of 2011 India census, Chitlapakkam had a population of 37,906. Males constitute 49.97% of the population and females 50.03%. Chitlapakkam has an average literacy rate of 84%, higher than the national average of 59.5%; with male literacy of 86% and female literacy of 82%. 9% of the population is under 6 years of age.

== Tambaram Corporation ==
Chitlapakkam town panchayat is now upgraded and part of Tambaram Municipal Corporation. A proposal was made to TN Government to make Tambaram as Tambaram Municipal Corporation and approved in 2021. Tambaram corporation as of 2021 encompasses five municipalities and five town panchayats of Perungalathur, Peerkankaranai, Madambakkam, Thiruneermalai and Chitlapakkam. The locality of Chitlapakkam has been awarded 3 wards (34, 43 and 44) of the total 70 wards demarcated in Tambaram Corporation.

== History ==
In 1971, Chitlapakkam was upgraded as a town panchayat. The town hit the headlines in the late 1980s and early 1990s when residents came together to successfully protect the Chitlapakkam Lake. Fearing that onslaught in different forms would irreparably damage the lake, like-minded citizens joined and mobilised public support and sensitised the State government to the need for preventing the shrinking of the lake in the form of encroachments.

In 2004, when the Department of Municipal Administration and Water Supply classified Chitlapakkam town panchayat as a special village panchayat, along with many other urban local bodies in Tamil Nadu, residents here impressed the elected representatives on the need for seeking municipality status. Though the council passed a resolution to this effect, the State government did not consider it.

== Activities and landmarks ==
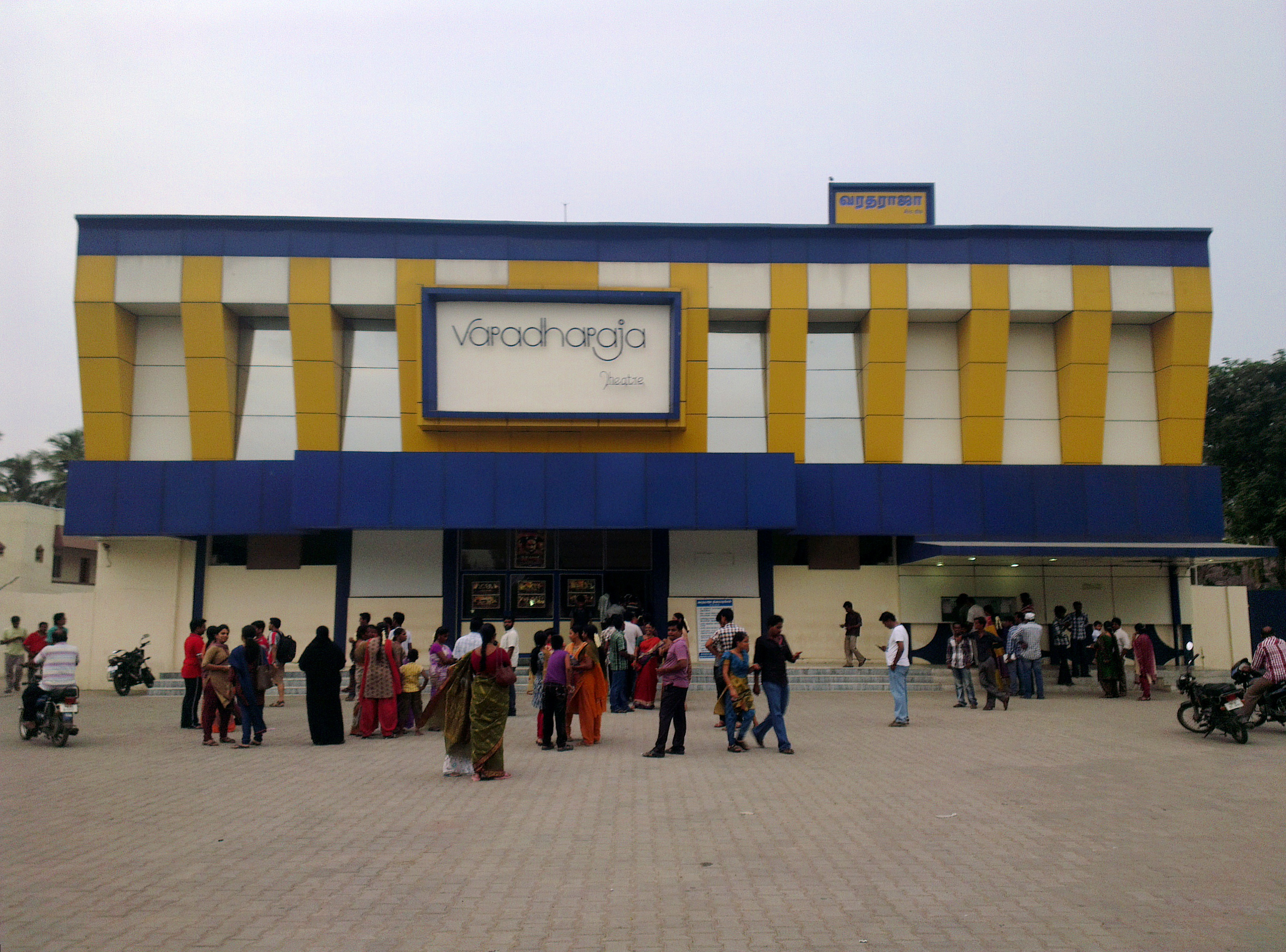
Varadaraja theatre

While industrial activity has been influenced positively due to the Warehousing Corporation of India's godowns the real growth has come about due to a heightened sense of citizen's participation and civic mindedness. This has happened gradually and in a non linear and participative fashion due to the efforts of various patriotic individuals and associations of persons. In this context the role of the civic body and its representatives need to be lauded since they do take feedback and try to implement the suggestions. A notable association has been the Muthulakshminagar welfare association which regularly meets the concerned ministers and public representatives to take up activities specific to the upliftment of Chitlapakkam like improvement of water table, waste segregation and preventing burning of waste at the Chitlapakkam lake, making efforts to include Chitlapakkam in the Chembarapakkam water scheme, ensuring more bus routes to operate via Chitlapakkam and so on, The real estate boom in the locality is due to a confluence of factors like abundant water supply, proximity to the IT companies in OMR & MEPZ, excellent quality of life and proximity to the city. Some of the landmarks in the area include Varadharaja theatre, Chitlapakkam tank, Indira Cotton Mill, MEPZ, Saravana Stores at Chrompet and so on. Varadaraja Theatre is just 400 m from Sanatorium railway station and GST road.

"Chitlapakkam Rising" is another interesting youth led social movement: See this article for details: http://www.thehindu.com/features/metroplus/society/when-streets-talk/article7637854.ece

== Infrastructure ==
=== Community hall ===
Unlike other local bodies, especially along arterial roads such as the Velachery Main Road, Grand Southern Trunk Road, Medavakkam Main Road and Tambaram Mudichur road, where there were plenty of private marriage halls, there were only a couple of them within the Chitlapakkam town panchayat limits. They were either not big enough or beyond the reach of the middle-class and lower income groups. In June 2012, community hall that was built next to the town panchayat office by the Chitlapakkam Town Panchayat was renovated. A sum of Rs. 760,000 was spent on sprucing up the walls and floors. Concrete floors were replaced with tiles in the ground and first floors of the hall. The open space outside the halls was fitted with contemporary cement concrete tiles. Another sum of Rs. 260,000 was spent on separate washrooms for men and women. Many families in Chitlapakkam organizing functions such as wedding engagements, get-togethers, wedding receptions and even birthday parties find this convenient.

=== Post office ===
The building housing the post office, which is adjacent to the Chitlapakkam panchayat office, was inaugurated in 1969 by the former Chief Minister M.G. Ramachandran. He was the Alandur Member of the Legislative Assembly at that time. although it was built to accommodate the post office, even today the Department of Posts is paying a monthly rent of Rs. 500 to the panchayat.

=== Transportation ===
The neighbourhood is served by two Chennai Suburban Railway stations: Tambaram sanatorium and Chromepet. Road transport for this locality is catered by government-run MTC buses and private share autos. BT roads in Chitlapakkam have been upgraded with the financial assistance from NABARD RDIF during the year 2009 to 2010 at the estimated cost of 1840,000. The proposed Mono rail station at Camp Road junction which is 2 km away can give quick access to Vandalur Zoo on the one side and to velachery on the other side.

=== MTC BUS ===
The Chitlapakkam bus stand is one of the oldest in the area. It is more than 75 years old. It is located near Chitlapakkam water tank and adjacent to Shanthi complex shops. It initially used to be 52D bus stop but now servers 51k(Tamabaram east to navalur), M51D (Saidapet to Kelambakkam), XE51 (Chitlapaakam to High Court), 51B (Saidapet to Karanai)

== Chitlapakkam Park ==
The Chitlapakkam park is located near the Chitalapakkam water tank. It is used by people for recreational purposes, walking and also has kid's playing area.

=== Wood-gas-fired crematorium ===
A sum of Rs. 4.4 million was spent on a wood-gas-fired crematorium. Chitlapakkam is the first among 561 town panchayats in Tamil Nadu to have this facility. The State government gave a grant of Rs. 3.3 million and the remaining cost of was met by the Chitlapakkam town panchayat from its general funds. The State government has also decided to entrust the responsibility of the facility's maintenance to Chromepet-based Shree Gayethri Trust, a voluntary organisation.

== Waste management ==
=== Dump yard ===
The open space near a lake in Chitlapakkam has been converted into a dump yard. The dump yard has been in existence for more than a century. The city generates about 8 tonnes of waste every day. Sanitary workers of the local body dump 3 tonnes of waste generated by the town at the half-acre yard in front of the lake and set fire to it. The smoke generated creates woes to the general public and the patients who come to the adjacent government hospital. The remaining 5 tonnes of waste is collected from 10,030 households in the 18 wards of the local body by Green Friends of Hand-In-Hand (HIH). It is segregated in a scientific method in a biocompost shed. HIH is a Kancheepuram-based NGO that specializes in solid waste management in the state.

=== Liquid waste management plant ===
Chitlapakkam was the only urban local body in the region to have a liquid waste management plant to prevent sewage from entering Sembakkam lake, treat it and use it again for gardening purposes. There are plans to buy some more vehicles for better collection and disposal of garbage. However, this project too has not been completely successful as sewage continues to drain into the lake from multiple entry points.

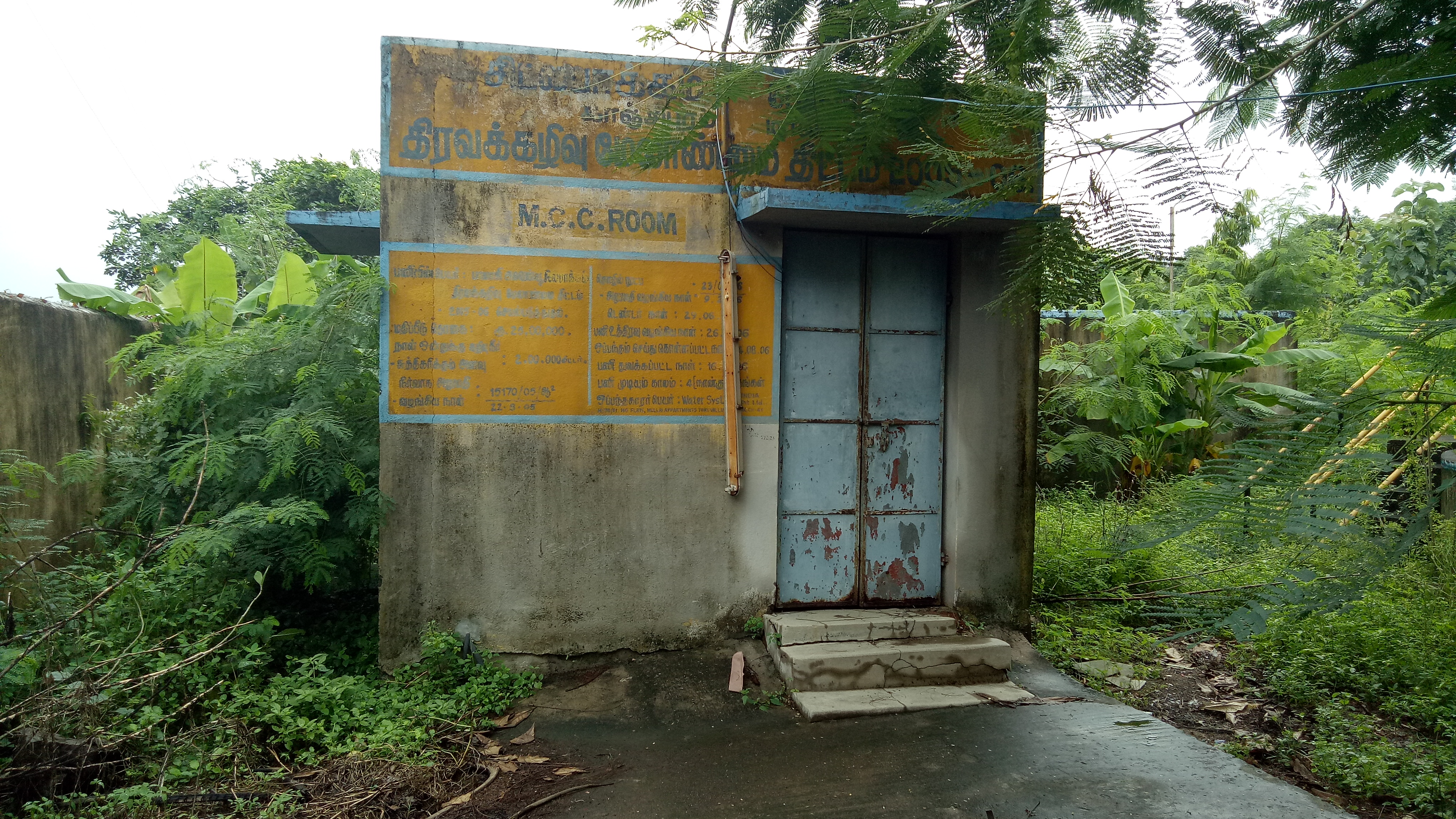
Liquid Waste Management Plant

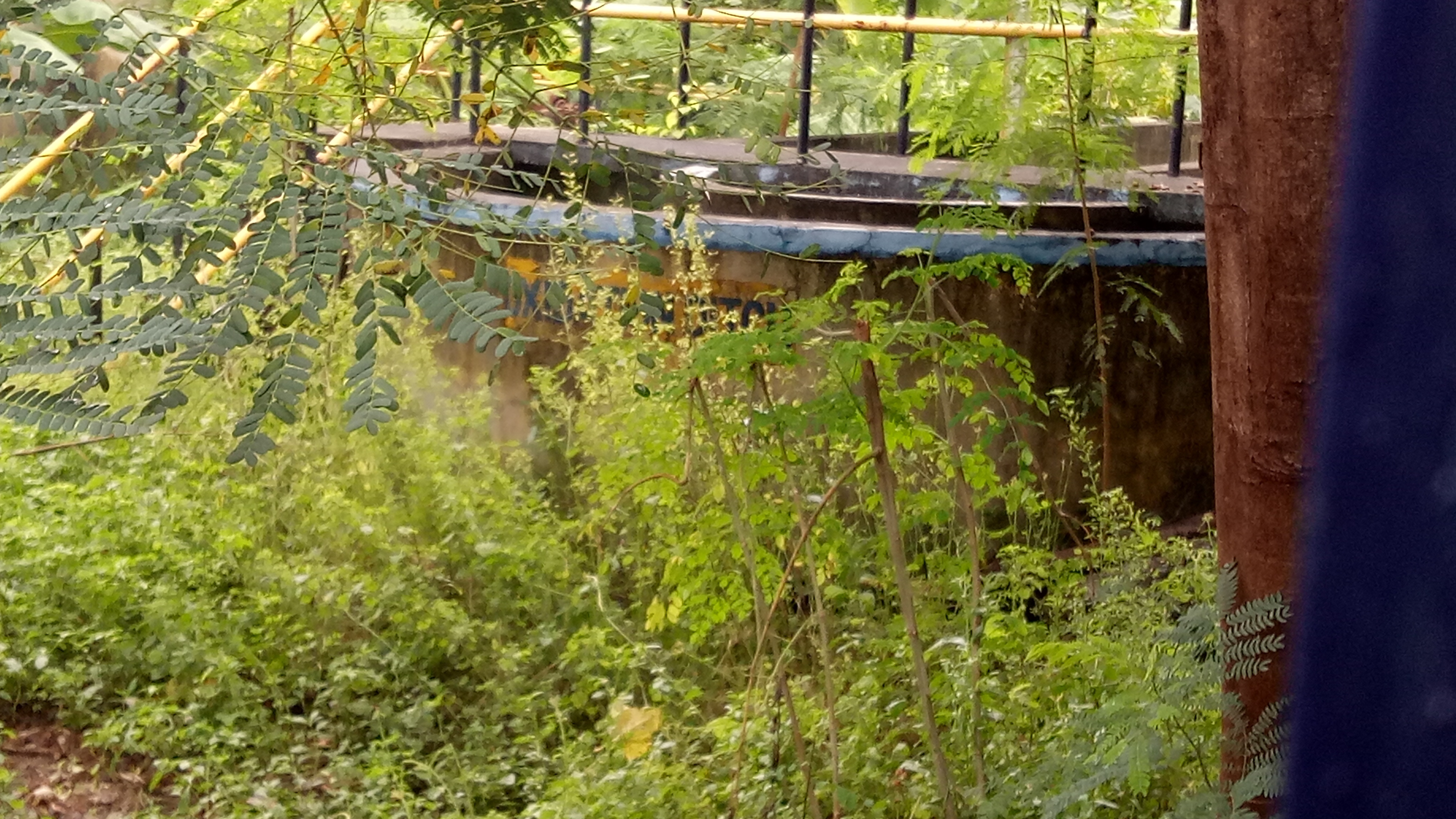
Liquid Waste Management Plant - Oxidation Tank

=== Solid waste segregation shed ===
During 2004, the Chitlapakkam town panchayat began door-to-door collection of garbage in seven of its wards. Twelve tricycles were used and conservancy workers were appointed to collect garbage from the houses. Each tricycle was shared by two workers. The collected rubbish were segregated into biodegradable and non-biodegradable substances in a segregation shed, constructed behind the town panchayat office.

Garbage management is a critical deliverable of any local administration. This article in the Times of India dated 15 August 2015 highlights a few successes of the Chitlapakkam waste segregation experiment and how Chitlapakkam has shown the way to tackle its own problems relating to hygiene.
