= Nagappa Nagar =

Nagappa Nagar, Chromepet
- neighbourhood
- Location within Chennai
- Coordinates: 12.95556°N 80.13389°E
- Country: India
- State: Tamil Nadu
- District: Kanchipuram
- Township: Chromepet, Chennai
- Established: Around 1984
- Founder: RVS constructions

Government
  - Body: CMDA

Languages
  - Official: Tamil
- Time zone: UTC+5:30 (IST)
- PIN: 600044

Nagappa Nagar is a colony in Chromepet, Chennai; it is a development which lies beyond New Colony to the west. Once empty land owned by the Chrome Leather Company, it was sold to builders and the entire land has been developed. Years of Developments : From 1984 till date.

It is now a predominantly residential colony with around 300 houses/flats and it is a good suburban colony of Chennai. Most of the plots are individual houses with some apartments too. Srimathi Sundravalli Memorial School is also part of the colony which was developed along with the colony in 1986. There are few departmental stores in it which serves the colony needs. Chandran Nagar, New Colony, Nagalkeni and Lakshmipuram are the colonies near Nagappa Nagar.

There are well established roads, Underground sewage & drinking water supply. Many Doctors / Specialists are residing and practising in this locality. Skin specialist, Homoeopathy specialists, Child specialists etc. are practising here. The ground water is contaminated in most of this area, by the surrounding leather tanneries in this area. Only a few exceptions are there.

This area comes under Pallavaram assembly constituency of Tamil Nadu.

A resident association (registered with the govt of Tamil Nadu) works with the residents and provides security arrangements by employing night watchmen and also facilitates cleaning of roads by working with the Thiruneermalai panchayat.[2]
