= Chromepet railway station =

Railway station in Chennai, India

Chromepet குரோம்பேட்டை
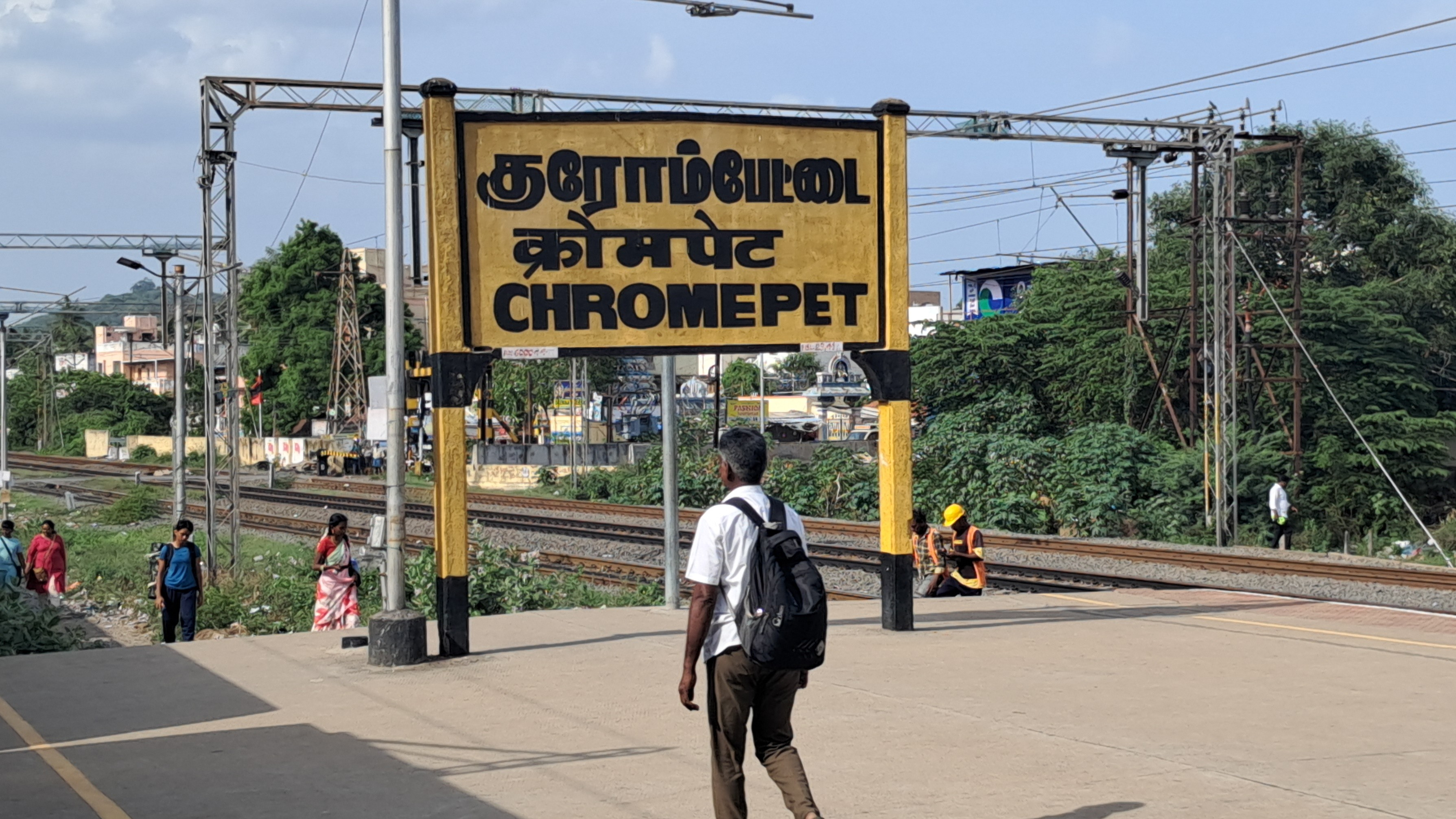
- Chromepet railway station as of June 2025

General information
- Location: Chromepet Station Rd, Chitlapakkam, Chromepet, Tambaram, Tamil Nadu 600 044, India
- Coordinates: 12°57′3″N 80°8′26″E
- System: Indian Railways and Chennai Suburban Railway station
- Owner: Ministry of Railways, Indian Railways
- Lines: South and South West lines of Chennai Suburban Railway

Construction
- Structure type: Standard on-ground station
- Parking: Not available

Other information
- Status: Active
- Station code: CMP
- Fare zone: Southern Railways

History
- Opened: Early 1900s
- Electrified: 15 November 1931
- Former names: South Indian Railway

Services
Preceding station	Chennai Suburban	Following station
Pallavaram towards Chennai Beach	South Line	Tambaram Sanatorium towards Tambaram, Chengalpattu Junction or Villupuram Junction
Route map
Chennai Beach — Villupuram
Location

Chromepet railway station is one of the railway stations of the Chennai Beach–Chengelpet section of the Chennai Suburban Railway Network. It serves the neighbourhoods of Chromepet, Chitlapakkam, and surrounding areas. It is situated about 25 km (16 mi) from Chennai Beach, and has an elevation of 23.41 m (76.8 ft) above sea level.

== History ==
Chromepet railway station lies on the Chennai Beach—Tambaram suburban section of the Chennai Suburban Railway, which was opened to traffic on 11 May 1931. The tracks were electrified on 15 November 1931. The section was converted to 25 kV AC traction on 15 January 1967.

In 1998, the railways decided to replace the level crossing at the north side of the station with a subway. In 2008, the project was re-designed as a road under bridge (RUB) with the involvement of the highways department to allow all vehicles. However, in late 2008, following objections from about 400 families residing on either side of the level crossing, the design was changed again to a limited-use subway, measuring 33 m (108 ft) long, 8.3 m (27 ft) wide and 3.5 m (11 ft) high. On 27 February 2009, construction of the ₹ 75.5-million limited-use subway began. However, the work has been stalled due to land acquisition problems.

The level crossing on the south side of the station, called "MIT Gate" was closed in January 2000 and construction of a massive ROB with four ramps on the GST road, a rotary on top and a two lane ramp extending over the tracks to the eastern side which connected with the Chitlappakam main road was commenced. After prolonged construction due to litigation by affected families, change of state government during the interim period etc., it was completed and thrown open to public in January 2006. Now known popularly as the "MIT Flyover", it serves as a vital lifeline for the populace of Nehru Nagar, Hastinapuram, Chitlapakkam and surrounding areas to easily access the GST road.

== The station ==
=== Platforms ===
There are a total of 4 platforms and 4 tracks. The platforms are connected by foot overbridge. These platforms are built to accumulate 24 coaches express train. The platforms are equipped with modern facility like display board of arrival and departure of trains.

=== Station layout ===
G	Street level	Exit/Entrance & ticket counter
P1	FOB, Side platform | Doors will open on the left
P1	Platform 1	Towards → Chennai Beach; Next Station: Pallavaram
P1	FOB, Island platform | P1 Doors will open on the left/right | P2 Doors will open on the right
P1	Platform 2	Towards ← Tambaram / Chengalpattu Jn / Villuppuram Jn; Next Station: Tambaram Sanatorium
P1	Platform 3	Towards → Chennai Egmore
P1	FOB, Island platform | P3 and P4 | (Express Lines)
P1	Platform 4	Towards ← Chengalpattu Junction
P1

== Safety ==
In the Guindy–Chengalpet stretch of the suburban section, which suffers from more fatal accidents of about 30 people a month compared to other stretches of the suburban network, the Chromepet–Tambaram stretch remains the deadliest with at least 15 accidents occurring every month as of 2011. Of the 181 people killed on the tracks between Guindy and Chengalpet in 2011, one-fourth were killed on the tracks between Chromepet and Tambaram stations.

The station also lacks several basic amenities.

In June 2014, an FOB connecting the Chromepet bus stand on the GST road with the Chromepet railway station was completed. It has 2 stairs on either side of the GST road, a slope on one of those sides, and 2 working escalators on both sides for climbing the FOB instead of taking the pain to climb stairs. It connects the existing FOB of the Chromepet railway station.

== See also ==
- Chennai Suburban Railway
- Railway stations in Chennai
