= Government Hospital of Thoracic Medicine, Chennai =

Government Hospital of Thoracic Medicine
- Government of Tamil Nadu

Geography
- Location: Grand Southern Trunk Road, Tambaram Sanatorium, Chennai, Tamil Nadu, India
- Coordinates: 12°56′40″N 80°7′45″E

Organisation
- Care system: Public
- Type: Full-service medical center
- Affiliated university: Stanley Medical College

Services
- Beds: 776 (sanatorium), 120 (rehabilitation centre)

History
- Founded: 1928

Government Hospital of Thoracic Medicine, popularly known as the Tambaram TB Sanatorium, is a major state-owned hospital situated in Chennai, India. The hospital is funded and managed by the state government of Tamil Nadu. It was founded in 1928.

== History ==
The hospital was established by Dr. David Jacob Aaron Chowry-Muthu, a private tuberculosis specialist an MD and an MRCS, in 1928. Upon returning from the United Kingdom, he started the hospital on 9 April 1928 on the mountainside of Pachamalai (Green Hillock) in Tambaram. Spread over an area of 250 acres (100 ha), the hospital was opened with 12 beds, and Muthu aimed to develop the hospital similar to the Mendip Hills Sanatorium in the United Kingdom. In medicine, Dr. Chowry-Muthu specialised in pulmonary tuberculosis. In an era when BCG was yet unknown, he was a strong advocate of the open air and clean surroundings cure for the dreaded disease, which meant the sequestering of patients in sanatoria. By the early 1900s, he was physician-in-charge of the Inglewood Sanatorium at the Isle of Wight. By 1910 or so, Dr. Chowry-Muthu had established the Hill Grove sanatorium at Mendip Hills, Somerset. One of his high-profile patients, albeit for a brief while in 1917, was Srinivasa Ramanujan, the mathematician.

Another of Dr. Chowry-Muthu's friends was Mahatma Gandhi, who shared his views on nature cures. Perhaps due to the latter's influence, Dr. Chowry-Muthu began spending increasing amounts of time in India from 1920 onwards. It was then that he hit upon the idea of beginning a sanatorium for tubercular patients. He acquired 250 acres of land in Tambaram and on April 9, 1928, the sanatorium, with 12 beds was inaugurated by Sir C.P. Ramaswami Aiyar.

However, he had to move to England once again, and he sold the property to the Government of Madras on 24 March 1937. Taken over by the state government, the hospital was made into a sanatorium.

The sanatorium grew over the next decades with the addition of several facilities such as operation theatre, additional wards, radiology block, and laboratory. The growth stagnated for a brief period during the Second World War. Upon Independence in 1947, a rehabilitation colony spread over an area of 17.14 acres (6.94 ha) was opened by the Indian government's then Minister of Health, Rajkumari Amrit Kaur, for fully cured TB patients with facilities such as learning printing, tailoring, book binding and rattan chair making.

In 1976, more wards were created and the total bed count increased to 776. With the hospital gaining importance over the years, a new railway station named 'Tambaram Sanatorium railway station' was built to serve the locality and a separate postal division with the postal index code of 600047 was created.

The institute was the participatory sanatorium in 'Madras Study', a study conducted by the Madras Chemotherapy Centre (now known as the TB Research Centre) to assess efficacy of home versus sanatorium treatment for tuberculosis. With the decline in tuberculosis cases in the region in the early 1980s, the TB sanatorium became officially known as the 'Government Hospital of TB and Chest Diseases', and, in 1986, acquired the present name as 'Government Hospital of Thoracic Medicine'. With the admission of a couple of TB patients with HIV in 1993, the hospital became a HIV care and training centre.

In 2002, the Tamil Nadu–CDC collaborative project was formalized. On 1 April 2004, National ART Programme was introduced in the sanatorium. In 2005, fellowship programme for doctors on HIV was initiated. In 2007, NACO declared GHTM as a centre of excellence. In 2008, second-line ART Programme was introduced. In 2009, the centre was recognised by the Central TB Division as DOTS PLUS site. In the same year, the centre was also recognized as a post-graduate centre for MD (TB & chest) by the Medical Council of India (Stanley Medical College).

Today, the hospital remains an exclusive centre for thoracic medicine and a centre of excellence conducting research in the field of HIV/AIDS and tuberculosis.

== The sanatorium ==
The hospital is the largest AIDS care centre in the country, catering to about 300 in-patients in 8 exclusive HIV wards and 300 out-patients daily. There are separate wards for men, women, and children.

The hospital has a sanctioned strength of 776 beds, in addition to 120 beds in the rehabilitation centre. It has 31 wards with more than 1,000 in-patients at any point in time. About 1,000 out-patients (including HIV patients) visit the hospital every day. With 21 medical officers, including superintendent, deputy superintendent and resident medical officer, 122 nurses and nursing supervisors, 17 technical staff and 46 paramedical staff in the laboratory, radiology, electrical and maintenance departments, and 45 ministerial staff in the administration department, the staff strength remained constant since the 1980s. There are about 251 sanctioned house-keeping staff.

== The laboratory ==
In March 2013, the hospital's laboratory received accreditation from the National Accreditation Board for Testing and Calibration Laboratories (NABL) of the Department of Science and Technology. The lab is only the second laboratory to receive this recognition after the one in Madras Medical College, which is a national reference lab, and the only one to receive the same among state reference laboratories in Tamil Nadu and the Union Territory of Puducherry. The state reference laboratories comes under the umbrella of national reference lab, which is a nodal institution.

The lab is operational since the establishment of the GHTM in 1928. It was upgraded and completely renovated in 2003 with financial support from Center for Disease Control, Government of the United States of America, in association with the Central and state governments and Tamil Nadu State AIDS Control Society (TANSACS). The lab has 20 staff and about 150 tests are done in the lab every day.

== See also ==
- Healthcare in Chennai
- Government General Hospital, Chennai
