= Dhenupureeswarar Temple (Madambakkam) =

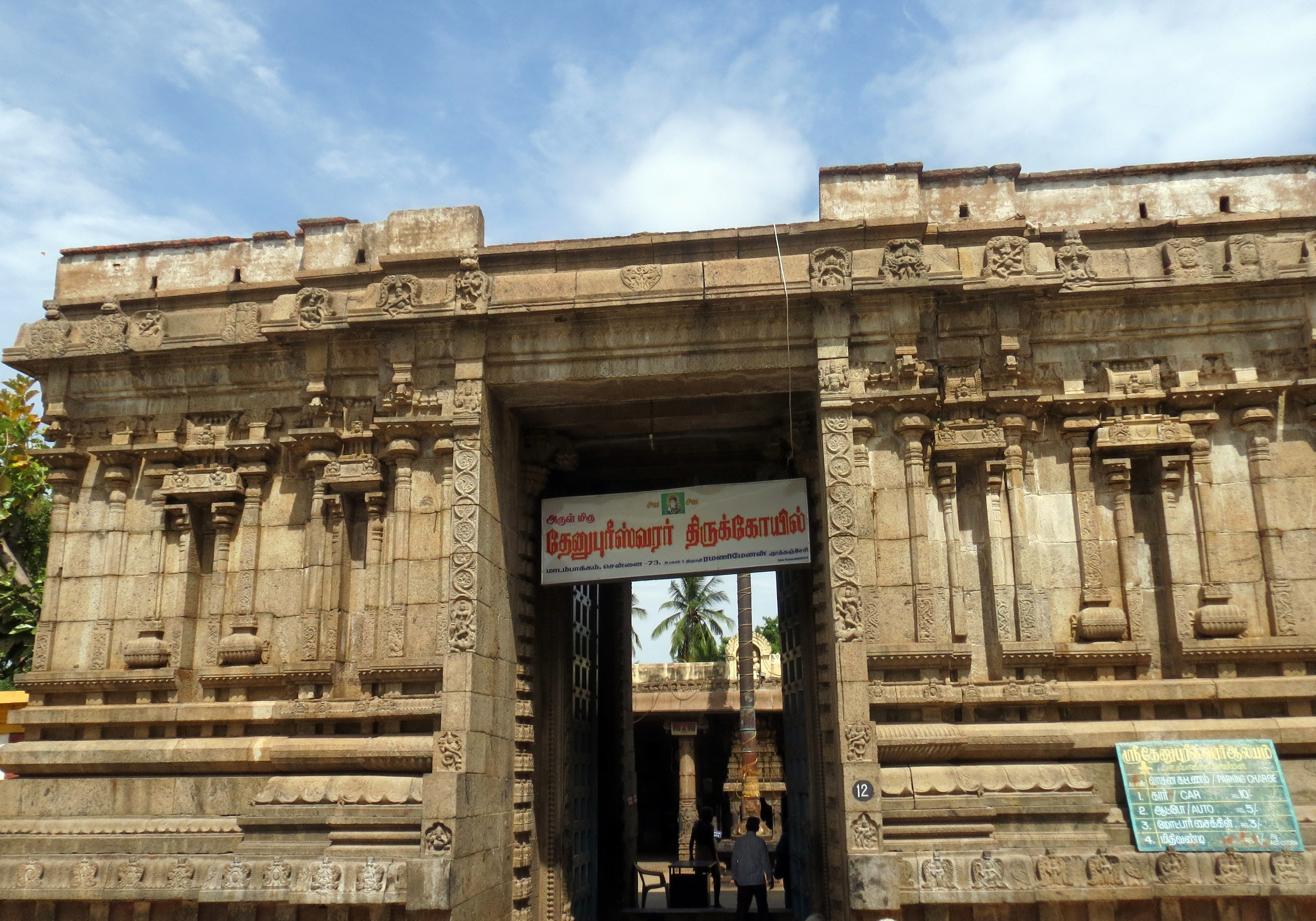

- Location in Tamil Nadu

Religion
- Affiliation: Hinduism
- Deity: Dhenupureeswarar(Shiva), Dhenukambal(Parvati)
- Festivals: Pradosha, Panguni Uttiram, Navarathri

Location
- Location: Madambakkam, Chennai
- State: Tamil Nadu
- Country: India
- Coordinates: 12°53′55″N 80°09′36″E

Architecture
- Type: Dravidian
- Completed: circa 957–970 CE
- Direction of façade: East

Dhenupureeswarar Temple (also "Dhenupurisvara" and "Thiripureeswarar") is a Shiva temple located in Madambakkam, a suburb of Chennai, India. Dhenupureeswarar is the local name for the Hindu deity Shiva.

== Religious significance ==
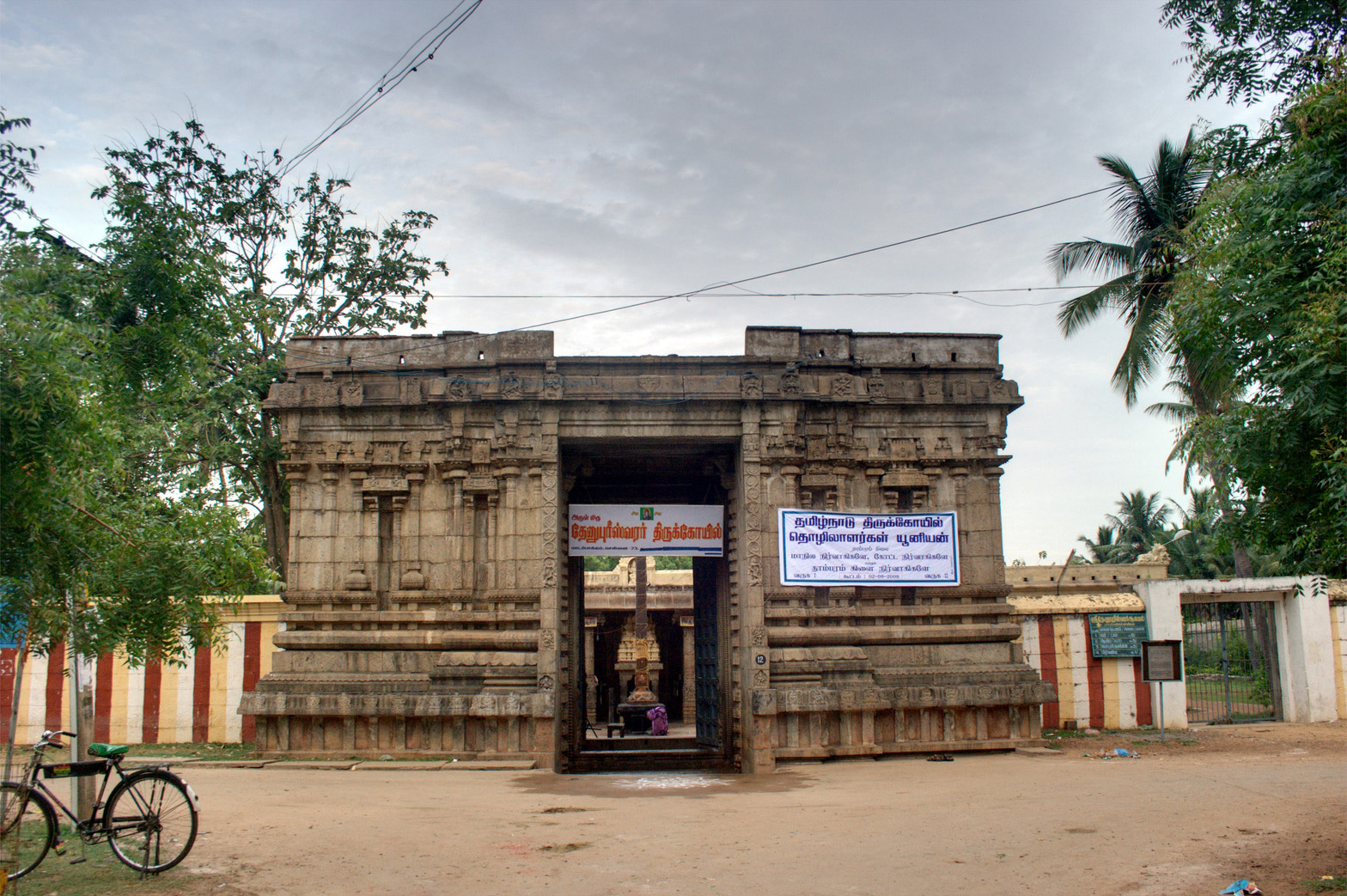
View of the main entrance to the temple

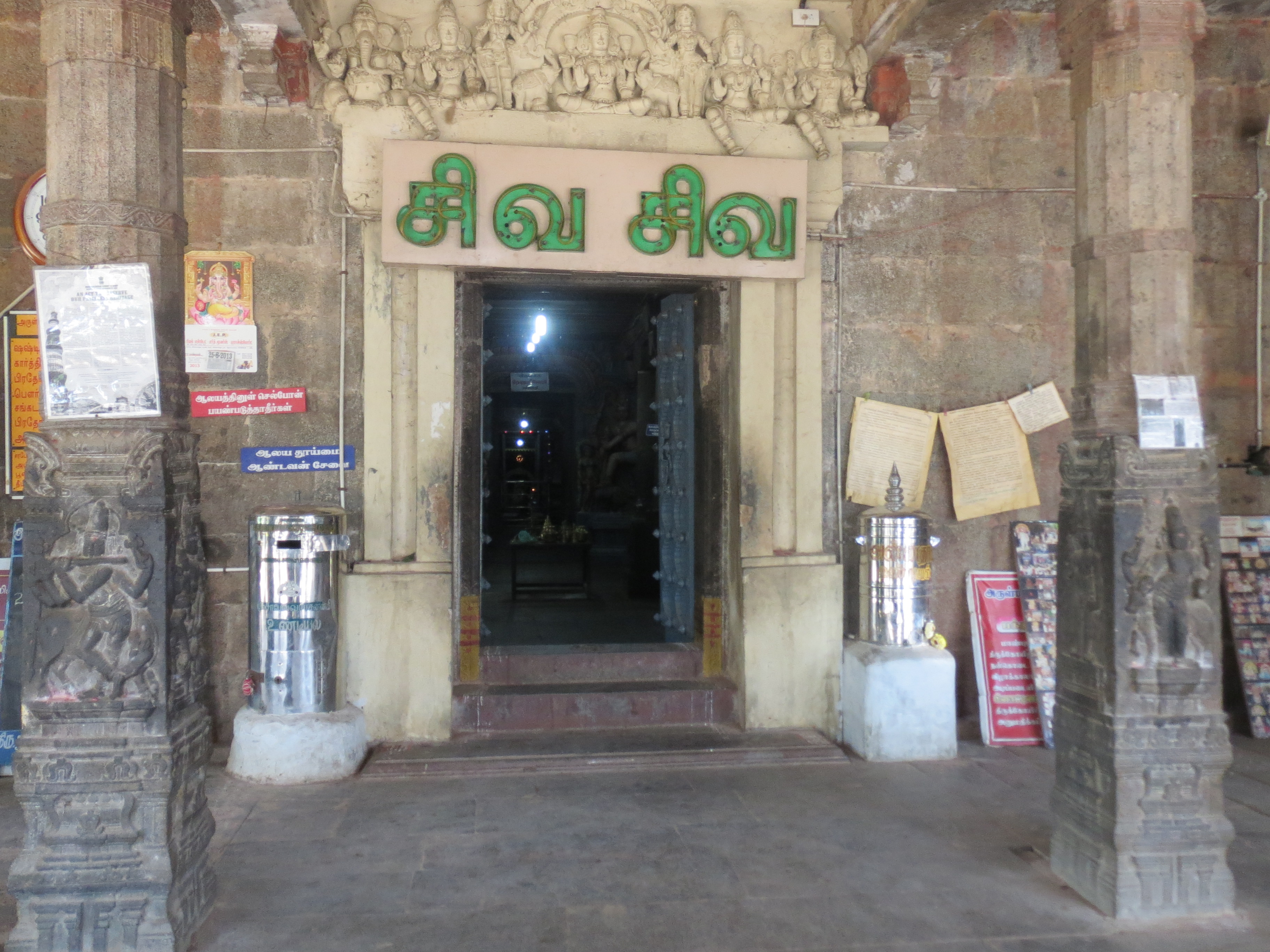
The sanctum sanctorum of the temple

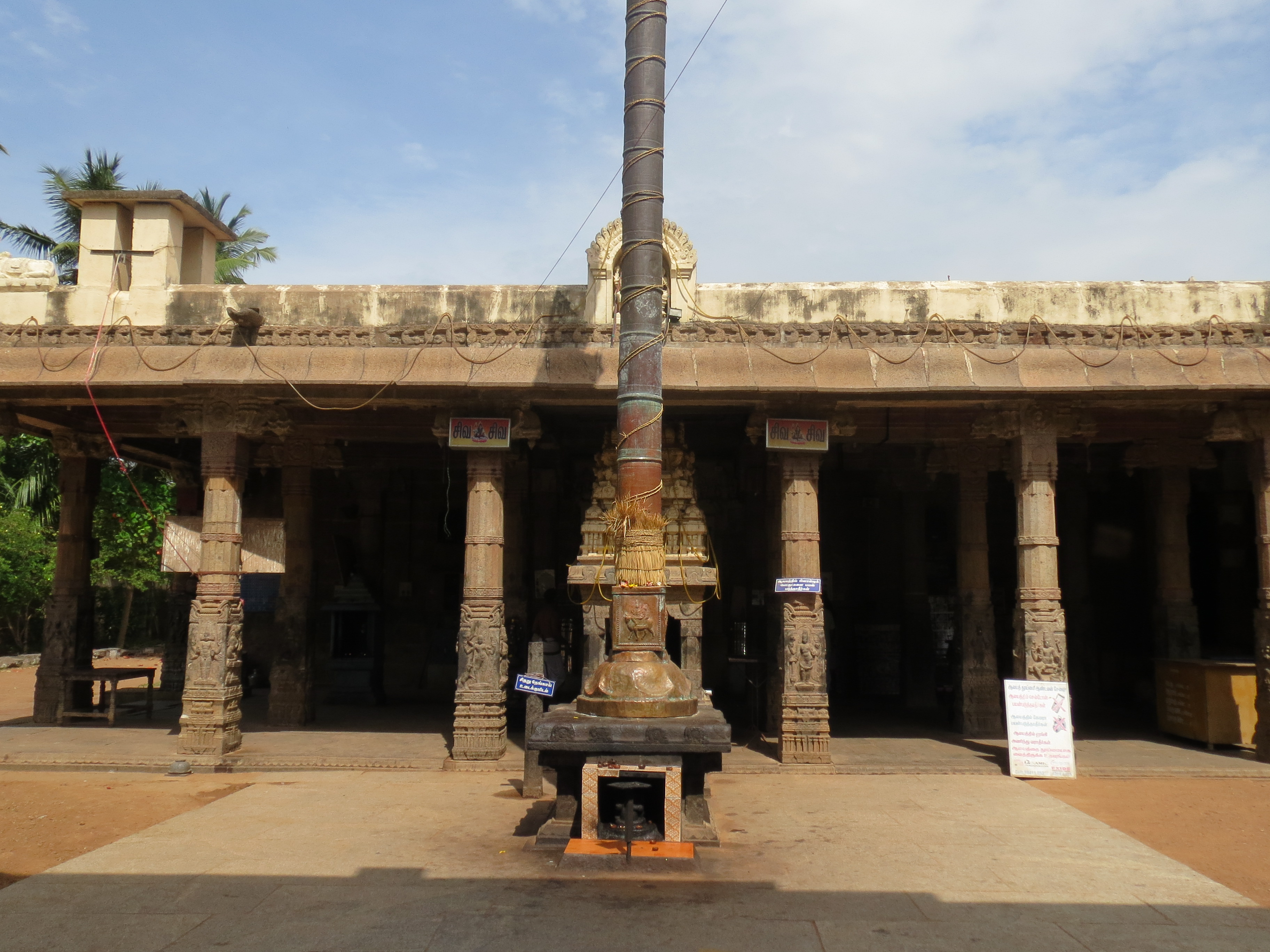
The kodimaram (sacred pole) of the temple

Dhenupureeswarar got his name because he gave moksha to a cow (Sanskrit: Dhenu). Sage Kapila is said to have been reborn as a cow for his sin of having improperly worshiped a Shiva lingam using his left hand. The cow continued to worship Shiva by pouring milk on a Shiva lingam buried in the ground. The cowherd initially punished the cow for wasting the milk, but when the villagers unearthed the Shiva lingam, Shiva appeared and granted moksha (liberation) to Kapila and forgave the cowherd who had mistreated him. Legend has it that the king had a dream of this occurrence at this site and had the temple built to commemorate it.

Dhenupureeswarar's consort here is Dhenukambal. The main building of the temple, which contains the statue of Dhenupureeswara in linga form, faces east and his consort faces south in a separate sanctum. The Shiva lingam is Swayambhu Lingam or self-manifested Lingam.

It is an interesting story of how the temple was discovered from its ruins. One of the Bhakts approached Maha Periyava Sri Chandra Sekarendra Saraswathi Swamigal and sought His blessings for his new built home at Selaiyur. Maha Periyava blessed him, and told him that there is an old Siva temple lying in ruins at a nearby village called Madambakkam. In those days, even Selaiyur was a distant suburb, and no one had heard of Madambakkam, even in Selaiyur. The Bhakt gathered some more men, and went in search of the temple. They cleared the bushes near the agricultural fields, and found an astounding temple in Chola architecture. They renovated it, performed Kumbabhishekam, and commenced daily pujas. The temple is now attracting thousands of people from nearby locations.

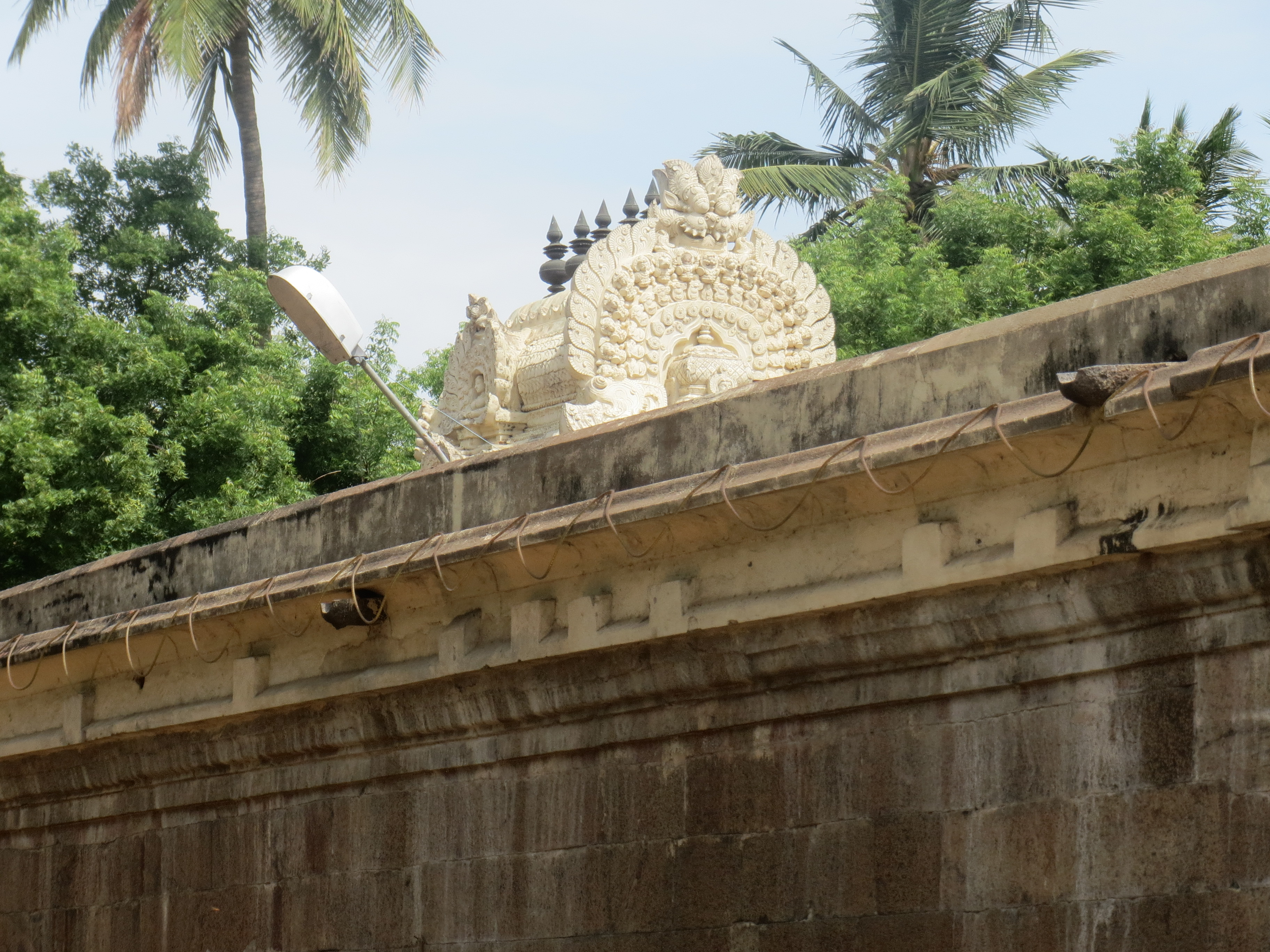
Temple Vimana

== Construction ==
The temple was built between 956 and 973 CE during the reign of the Chola king, Parantaka Chola II, father of Raja Raja Chola I, who constructed the famous Brihadeeswarar Temple in Thanjavur. The main sanctum (Sanskrit: garbha griha), like some other Chola temples in and around Chennai, is apsidal in shape (Sanskrit: gajaprishta vimana) (also described as shaped like the back of a sleeping elephant), unlike most Hindu shrines, which are square or rectangular.

The temple is thought to have been consolidated with stones during the reign of Kulothunga Chola I.

Well-preserved Chola sculptures and carved pillar bases are present in and around both sanctums.

A number of fine inscriptions and sculptures dating to the Vijayanagara Empire are also preserved.

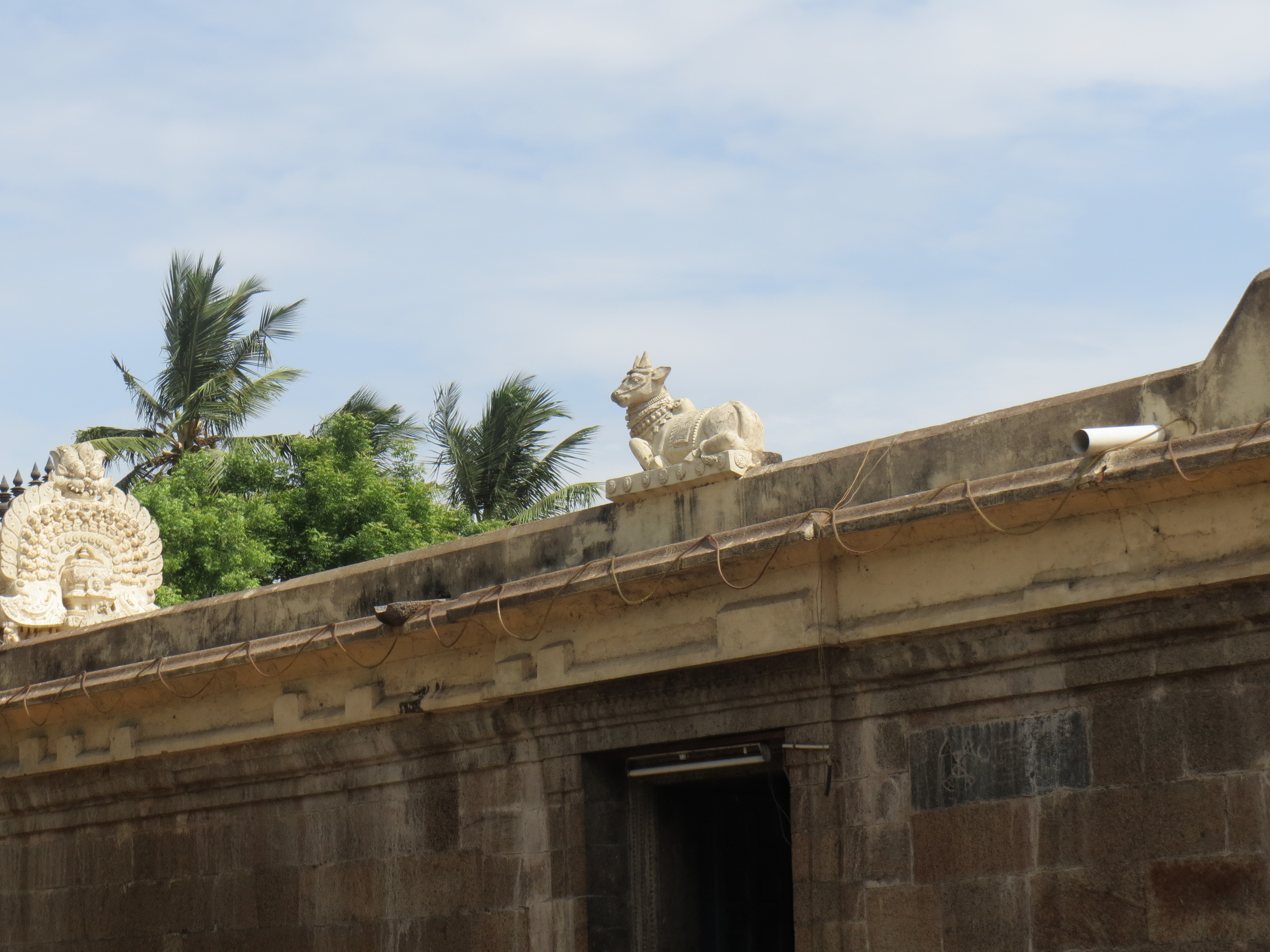
Nandi statue

== Restoration ==
The temple is one of a number of sites that have been conserved and restored under the auspices of the Archaeological Survey of India. Improvements included removing the damaged thick weathering course (roof surface) of the front mandapa and Amman Shrine and relaying with fresh weathering course.

The ASI states that the temple has been declared a monument of national importance under the Ancient Monuments and Archaeological Sites and Remains (amendment and validation) 2010 Act.

The temple is a National Monuments Authority notified site upon which construction is banned.

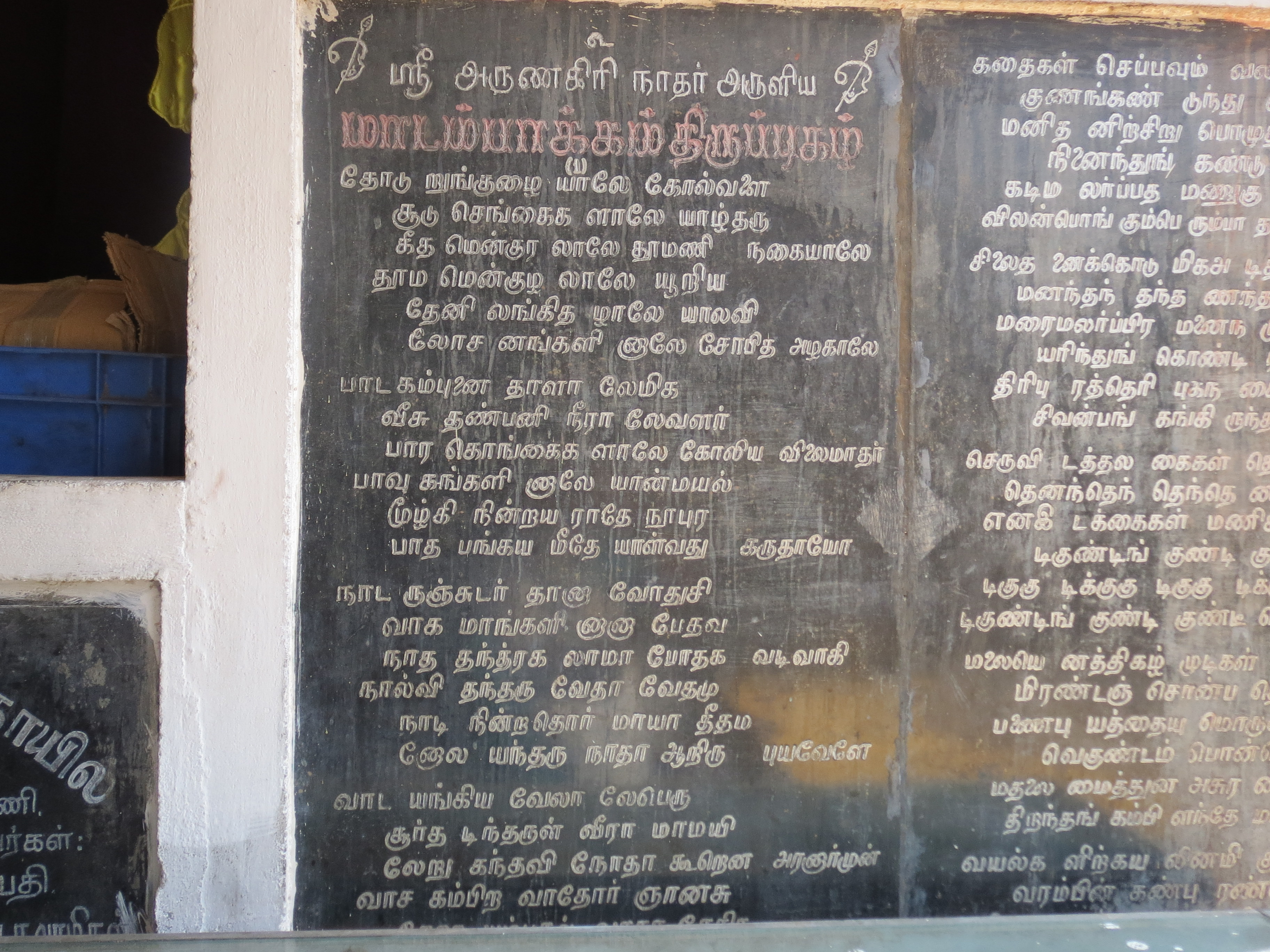
Verses mentioning the temple from Arunagirinathar's Thirupugazh inscribed on the temple wall

== Cultural significance ==
The 15th century Tamil poet Arunagirinathar's work contains a line mentioning the temple.

A number of religious festivals are celebrated at the temple, including Pradosha, Panguni Uttiram and during Navarathri, devotees visit to offer special pujas.

== See also ==
- List of Monuments of National Importance in Kanchipuram district
- Heritage structures in Chennai
