= Chitlapakkam Lake =

Chitlapakkam Aeri
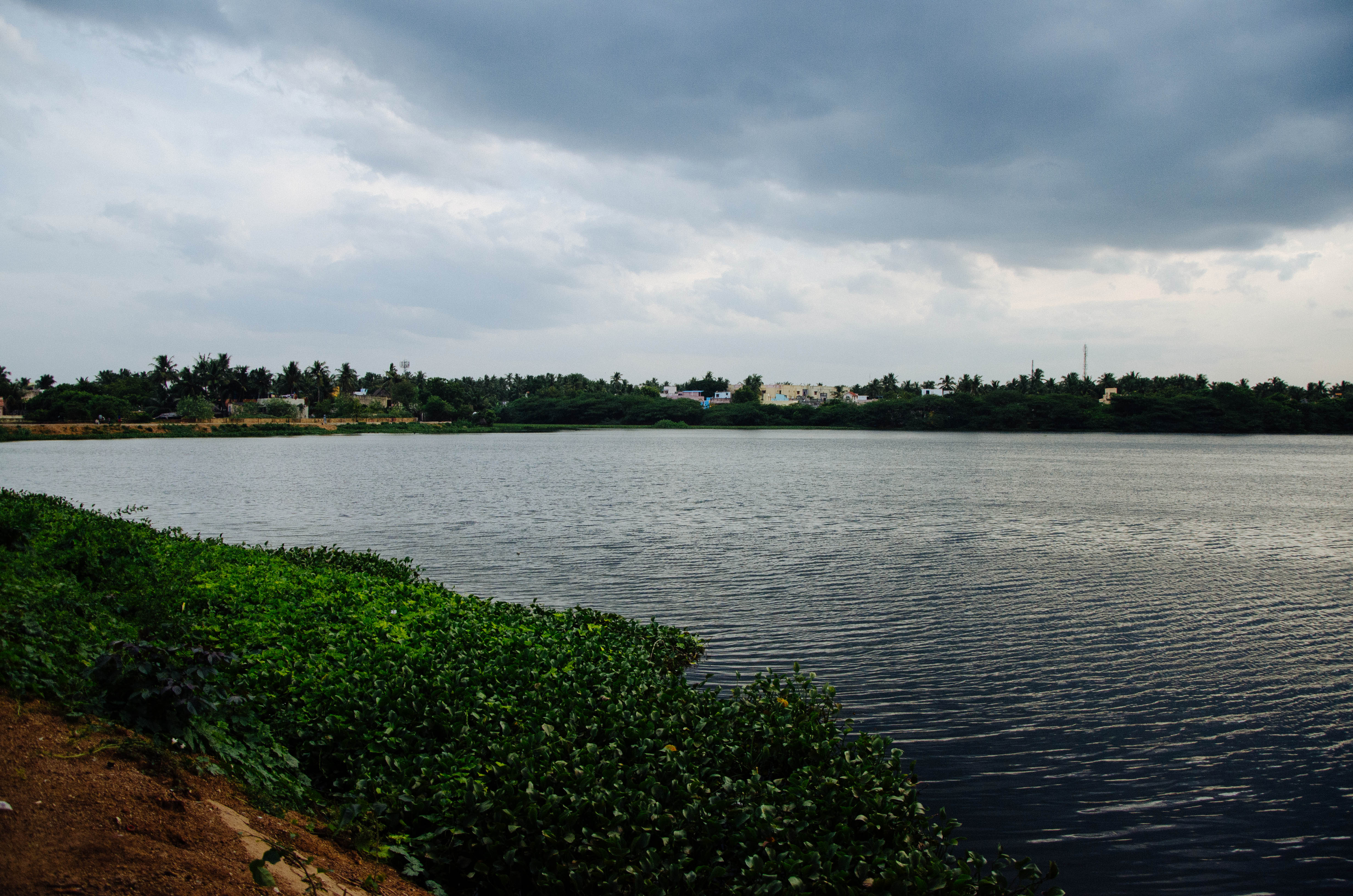
- Chitlapakkam Lake

- Location within Chennai
- Location: Chitlapakkam, Chennai, India
- Coordinates: 12°56′2″N 80°8′10″E
- Type: Lake
- Basin countries: India
- Surface area: 86.86 acres (35.15 ha) (actual); 46.88 acres (18.97 ha) (present)
- Settlements: Chennai

Chitlapakkam Aeri, or Chitlapakkam Lake, is an urban lake located in Chitlapakkam, Chennai, India. It is the chief water body in the neighbourhood. Originally measuring 86.86 acres, the lake has currently shrunken to 46.88 acres. The lake was last restored in 2003.

== History ==
Chitlapakkam lake is the uppermost tank in the Keelkattalai cluster of waterbodies. Before urbanization, Chitlapakkam was an important agricultural area. The water from the lake was then used for irrigation, with an ayacut area of 219 acres. Pachamalai hill in the neighbourhood served as a source for the lake. The original capacity of the lake was 7.02 million cubit feet.

Until the 1980s, the waterfront provided recreation. The lake filled water tanks in the nearby areas of Sembakkam and Hasthinapuram. Till the early 1980s, groundwater could be found in the neighbourhood at a depth of just 5 feet. The water level did not fall below 10 feet even at the peak of summer. The area became a residential area chiefly due to the reason that the water was potable. The lake also attracted migratory birds and was a favourite spot for birdwatchers.

In 1990, the government planned to use the lake bed for construction of public utilities, namely, a district court, bus terminus and the Tambaram Taluk office. Residential layouts were planned by the Tamil Nadu Housing Board on the lake bed. However, the locals resisted these governmental measures by means of a massive campaign to protect the lake and succeeded. The community also urged the Kancheepuram district administration to restore the lake. This resulted in strengthening of the lake bunds and raising their height to 10 feet in 2003. These measures increased the storage capacity of the lake. However, the lack of an underground drainage system in localities around the lake resulted in several gallons of untreated sewage flowing into the lake regularly. According to estimates by the public works department, as much as 175 encroachments have taken over various parts of the lake bed.

== The lake ==
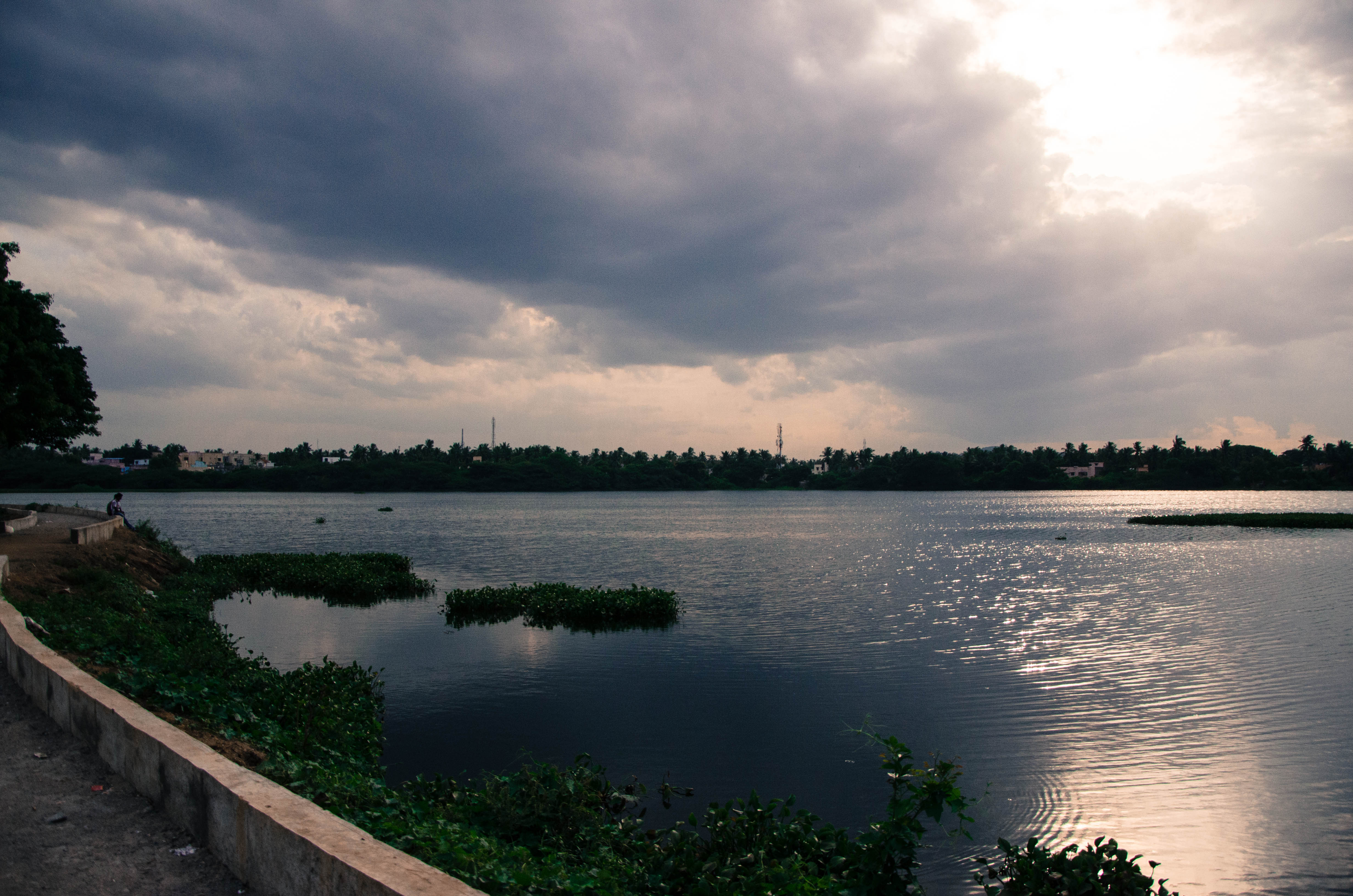
Chitlapakkam Lake

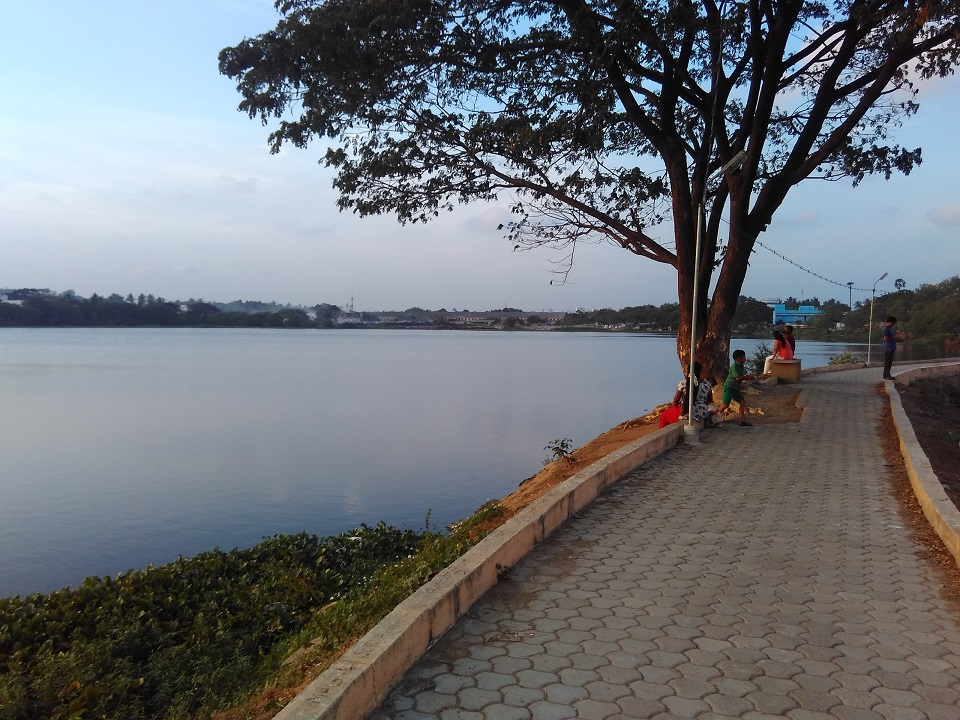
The bund in the lake

The total area of the water body is 86.86 acres. However, the water body has shrunk to 47 acres, chiefly due to encroachments.

After the conversion of agricultural farms into residential areas, the water from the lake is not used for irrigation. There are three channels at the foot of the hill, which have been connected to the Chitlapakkam Lake.

Because of the presence of lake, the water table level is higher compared with many other areas in Chennai. The level of water table in this area is 2.50 to 8 m, and the level of TDS is 400 to 900 ppm. The lake is also serves as a bird-watching center. From April to September spot-dotted pelicans are seen, and round the year grey herons are seen in this lake.

== Pollution ==
The lake has been contaminated by the sewage from houses in the neighbourhood. Garbage from 15,000 households and sewage from 1,500 commercial establishments on GST Road make their way into the lake. A recent audit by NGOs highlighted the critical condition the Chitlapakkam lake is in and the steps required to rejuvenate the lake.

The rainwater channels from the lake to the neighbouring Sembakkam lake, via Chitlapakkam Kulam and Haridasapuram and Pallavaram, are encroached upon, resulting in flooding during rainy season. In 1990, the state government planned to build a district court, a taluk office and a bus terminus on the bunds of the lake. However, the local residents staged a massive campaign and thwarted these plans.

== Dump Yard ==
The open space near a lake in Chitlapakkam has been converted into a garbage dump yard. The dump yard has been in existence for around two decades and wastes generated by households and businesses are dumped here. An RTI revealed that the panchayat started dumping at the lake without getting prior permissions from PWD (the owner of the lake) or the Pollution Control Board.

The town generates roughly around 8 tonnes of waste every day. Sanitary workers of the local body dump 3 tonnes of waste generated by the town at the half-acre yard in front of the lake.

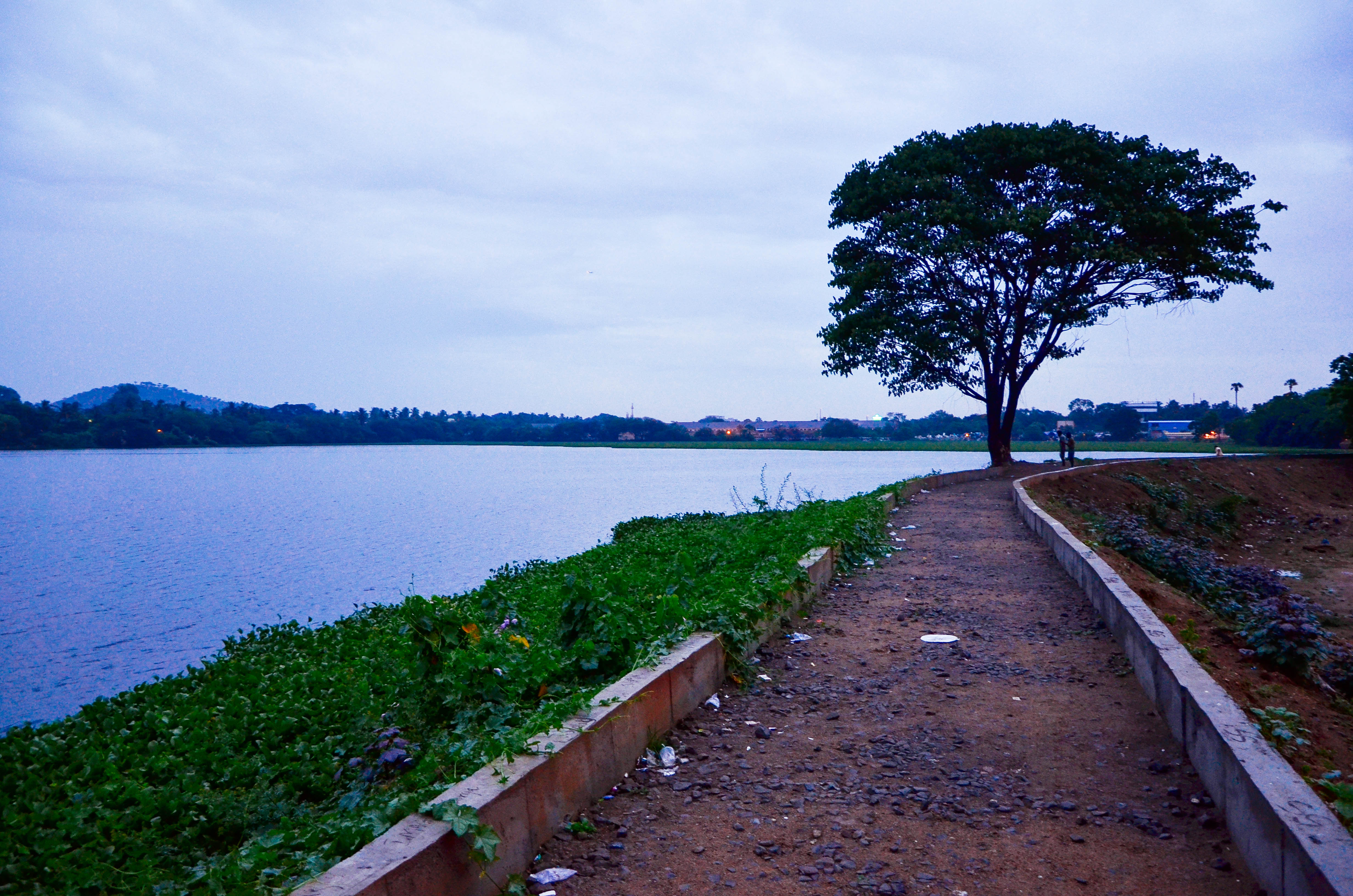
Newly laid pathway around Chitlapakkam lake

The remaining 5 tonnes of waste is collected from 10,030 households in the 18 wards of the local body by Green Friends of Hand-In-Hand (HIH). Houose hold wastes are collected by HIH conservancy workers, with a tri-cycle cart, door to door.

In the past, dump yard has caught fire multiple times resulting in smoke that creates woes to the general public and the patients who come to the adjacent government hospital.

The conservancy workers separate out plastics and metal that can be sold to scrap vendors. All other household waste, including dry and wet, is dumped in the lake dumpyard without further segregation. HIH workers are not equipped with adequate vehicles that can help them enforce proper segregation at source. Waste received from restaurants and vegetable shop owners are composted at the shed allocated for segregation and bio-composting.

The residents associations have raised several petitions over the decade, requesting the officials and political leaders to move the garbage dumpyard away from Chitlapakkam and to ensure the lake area is recovered and put to proper use.

== Restoration ==
A major restoration work was initiated in June 2003, when a ₹ 4 million project was mooted for which funds were collected from various sources including the government, residents, individuals, residents’ groups, and philanthropists.

According to a report submitted to the Kancheepuram district administration, improvement work on the lake would require an estimated ₹ 4.5 million for the improvement of the lake. The public has funded ₹ 1.5 million and the state government is funding ₹ 3 million. These work strengthened the lake bunds and increased their height by 10 feet.

On 10 February 2013, work to build a 750-m pathway around the lake, at the cost of ₹ 45 lakhs, commenced. It is proposed that the lake will be used for boating and a garden will be maintained around.

On 2nd June 2019, Chitlapakkam residents and volunteers organized a #SavingChitlapakkamLake mega cleanup and lake revival drive, with a NOC from Water Resources Department. The people movement started back in 2015 when Chennai Floods highlighted the importance of lakes had gain momentum since.

On 15 July 2019 the former chief minister of Tamil Nadu Thiru. Edappadi K Palaniswami announced 25 crores for the lake restoration under Rule 110 based on the request of Chitlapakkam Rajendran the district secretary of ADMK on behalf of the people of Chitlapakkam. Later in the year 2022, the encroachment drive came after a Madras High Court order to protect water bodies and making Chitlapakkam Lake a model waterbody for the rest of the state.

== Bird watching ==
The lake serves as a local bird-watching center from April through September, pelicans can be spotted. Migrated spot-billed pelicans build colonies in the lake. Grey heron and common coot can be found round the year.

== See also ==
- Water management in Chennai
