= Kumaran Kundram =

Religion
- Affiliation: Hinduism
- District: Chennai
- Deity: Sri Swaminathaswamy

Location
- Location: Chennai
- State: Tamil Nadu
- Country: India
- Interactive map of Kumaran Kundram

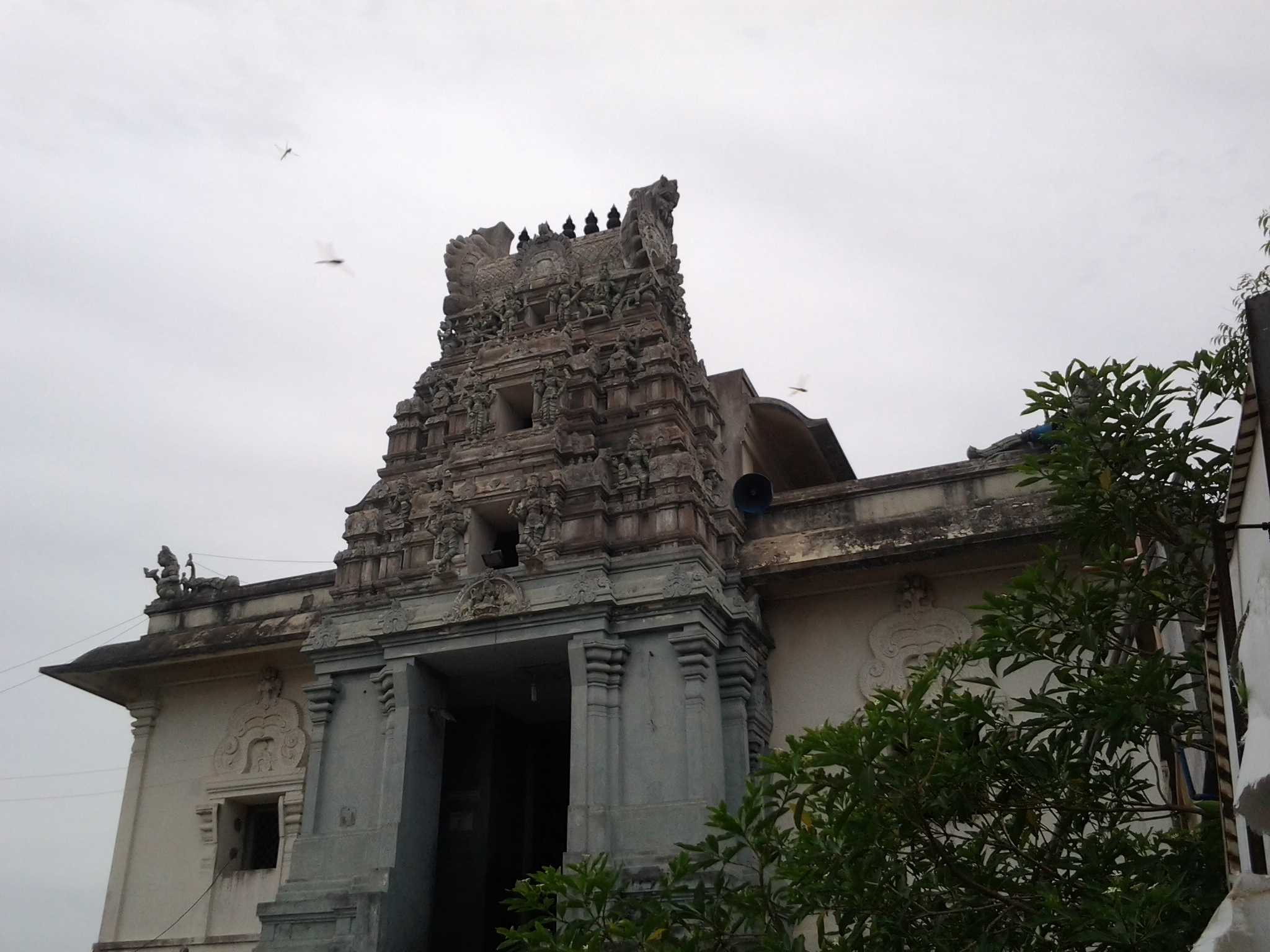
Kumaran Kundram Chromepet

Kumaran Kundram is a hillrock located at Chromepet, Chennai, Tamilnadu, India. It houses an about 40-year-old temple dedicated to the Hindu God Murugan. The temple can be reached by road from Chromepet en route to Hasthinapuram. The presiding deity is Sri Swaminathaswamy. The presiding deity in Kumaran Kundram is believed to be equivalent to the one in Swamimalai and stands atop the hillock facing north. It can be reached by a flight of about 80 steps.

== History ==
In 1956, Chandrashekarendra Saraswati Swamigal, a twentieth-century saint and seer of the Kanchi Mutt, visited Chromepet. On looking at the hill, he proposed that a temple be built for Murugan. The temple for Siddhu Vinayakar was built in the same year. Twenty years later, while clearing the hillside for a path, Vel, the prime weapon of Lord Muruga, was found. This inspired the devotees to speed up work. The consecration of the Sri Swaminathaswamy temple was performed in 1979. Slowly, more shrines were added for Shiva, Sharabheshvara, Ambal and the Navagrahas. The temple is run by a group of trustees.

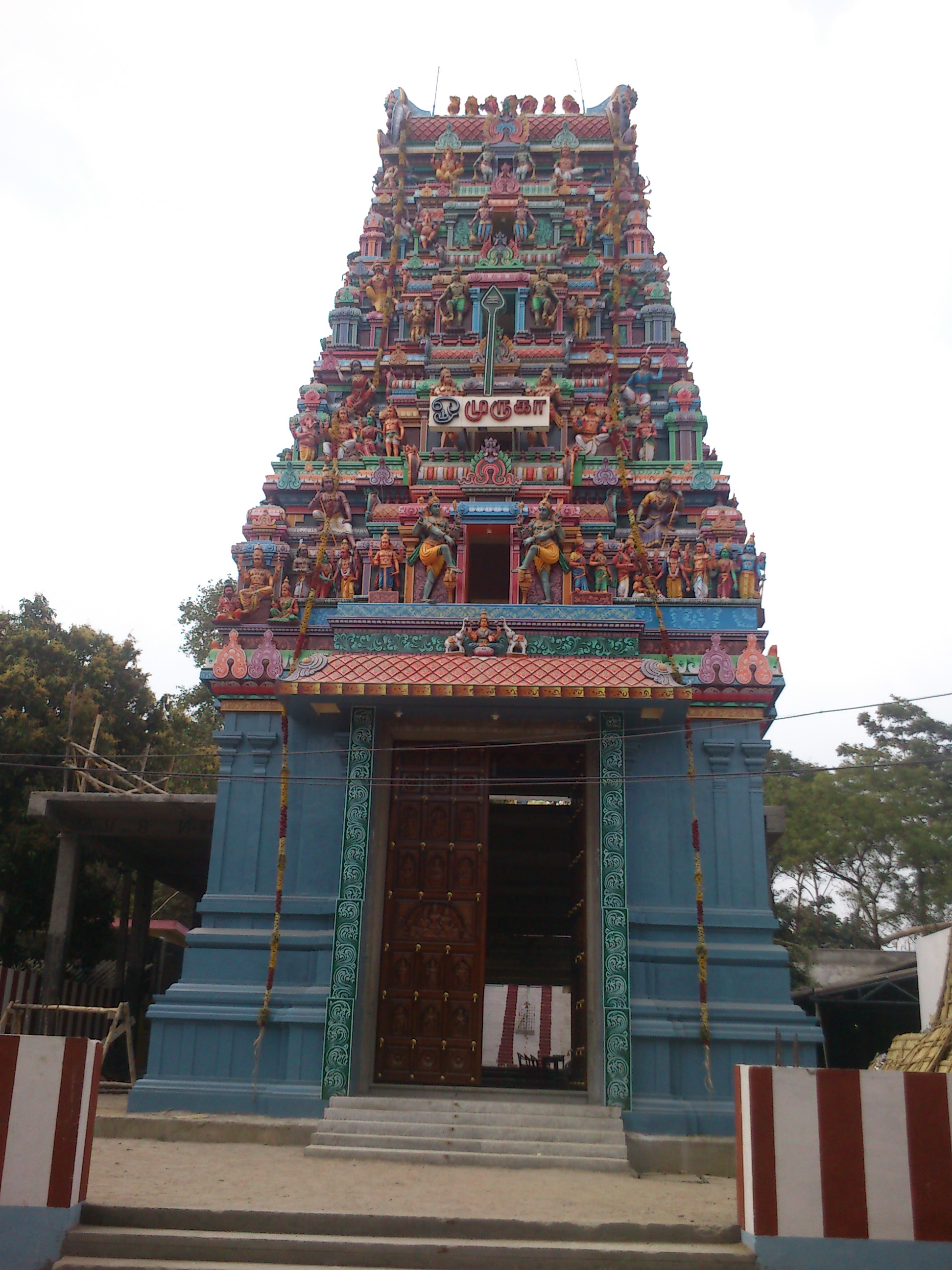
The newly constructed and consecrated 5-tier Raja Gopuram of Kumaran Kundram

A five tier Rajagopuram has been constructed recently. Though the spade work had commenced long ago, the actual construction work on the Rajagopuram commenced in 2011-12 and concluded in January 2014. Renovation and painting works have also been carried out in the temple in connection with the Mahakumbhabhishekam (consecration ceremony). A new Artha mandapam adjoining the Rajagopuram has been constructed. A few civil works remain to be completed(February 2014). A new Dwajasthambam (Flag Mast) has also been erected. Cultural and religious events like music, dance and discourses were held at the Arunagirinathar Hall inside the temple precincts every day for over a year in 2013-14 as a part of the Rajagopuram construction and temple renovation.

Religious ceremonies connected to the consecration commenced on 3 February 2014 and the consecration was conducted between 9.00 AM and 10.30 AM IST on 9 February 2014 (Sunday) in the presence of Swami Brahmayogananda, Founder, Acharya Yoga Shanthi Gurukulam, West Mambalam, Chennai and Niranjanandagiri Swamy of Gnananandagiri Peetam, Dakshina Halasyam, Thennangur.

On the day of consecration, thousands of devotees visited the shrine and took part in the full-day festivities. Shri Vijayendra Saraswathi Swamigal, the junior seer of the Kanchi Mutt visited the shrine in the evening and offered prayers to the deities.

The presiding deity was taken in a procession in a floral palanquin in the night to the accompaniment of temple music and chants of devotees.

The monthly circumambulation of the small hill temple on the night of full moon day (Girivalam) attracts hundreds of devotees every month. The annual Soorasamhaaram festival (in October/November) is the prime festival in this temple along with Karthigai Deepam celebrations (in November/December).

A large group of devotees by the name of "Sri Padam" are rendering regular service at the temple on voluntary basis.

== Prasanna Yoga Anjaneya Temple ==
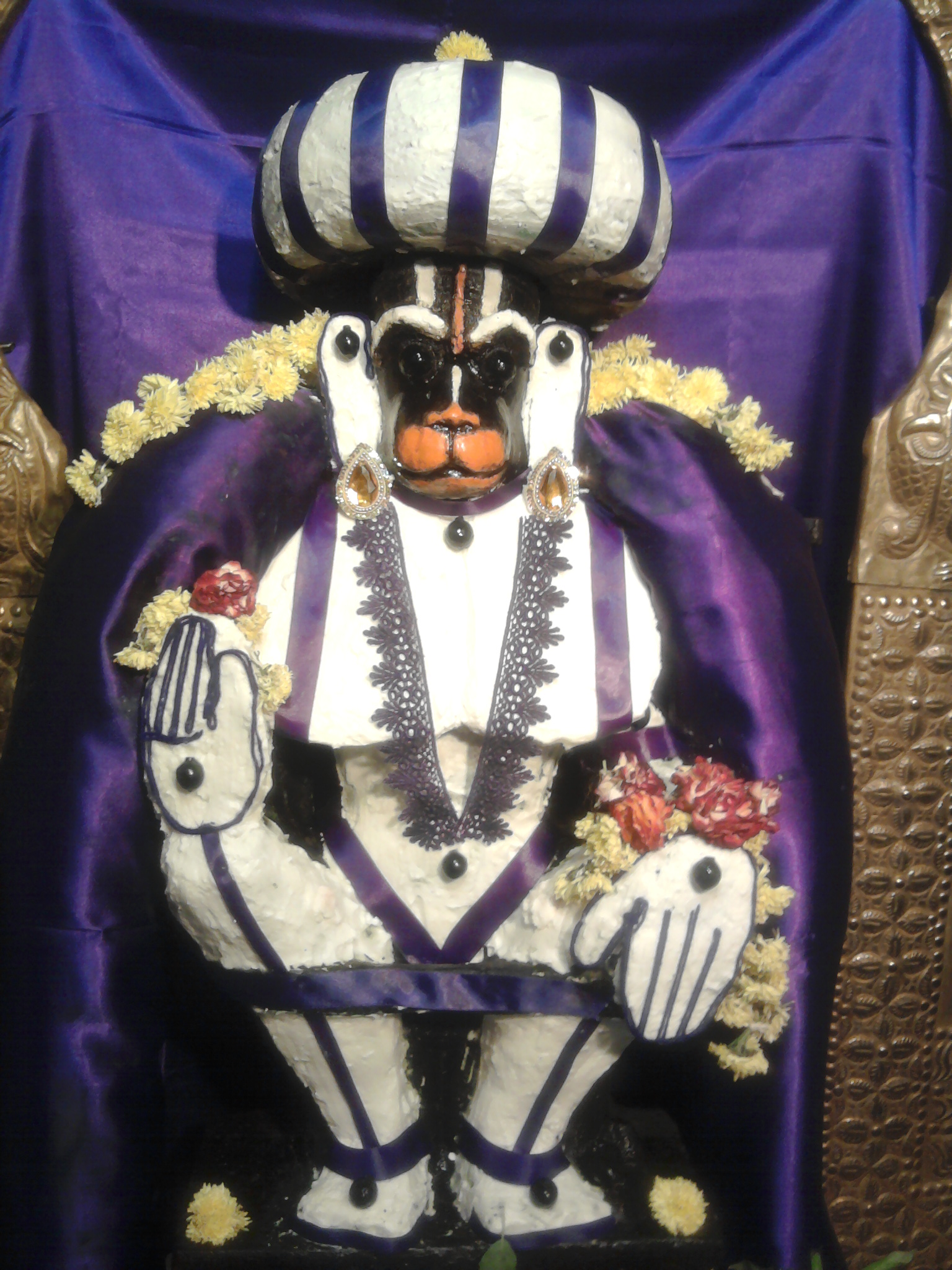
Prasanna Yoga Hanuman

Opposite to the Sri Swaminathaswamy Temple (Kumaran Kundram) is a small vaishnavite temple run by a hereditary trust. The presiding deity is Sri Prasanna Venkatesa Perumal and the goddess is Alarmel Mangai Thayar. To the left of the presiding deity is Sri Yoga Narasimha Swamy. There are separate shrines for Prasanna Yoga Anjaneyar (Hanuman)and Ramanujar. The ground where this temple is built belonged to Shri. Srinivasan Thiagarajan, who gave it in exchange for another piece of land in the same locality. The temple attracts large crowds on Saturdays, New Year Eve and Vaikunta Ekadasi.Praharam to Narasimha is performed by hundreds of devotees in the month of Karthigai (November–December).

== See also ==
- Religion in Chennai
