= Madambakkam =

Neighborhood of Tambaram, India

- Neighbourhood
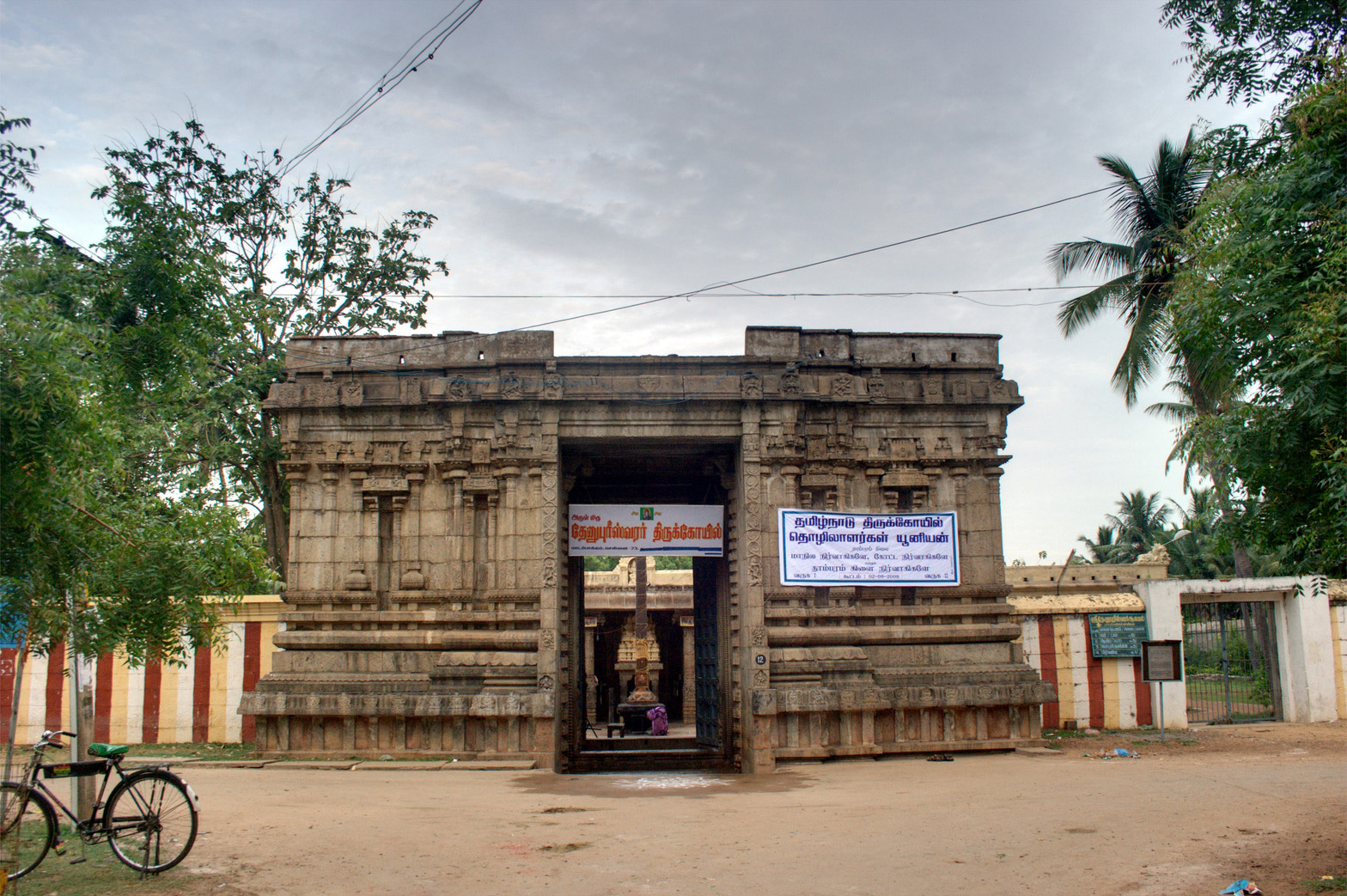

- Location in Chennai Metropolitan Area Location in Tamil Nadu Location in India
- Coordinates: 12.903848°N 80.15861°E
- Country: India
- State: Tamil Nadu
- Metro: Chennai Metropolitan Area
- District: Chengalpattu
- City: Tambaram

Government
  - MP: T.R. Baalu (DMK)
  - MLA: S.R. Raja (DMK)
  - Corporation Commissioner: R. Alagumeena IAS
  - Mayor: K. Vasanthakumari (DMK)
  - Deputy Mayor: G. Kamaraj (DMK)

Area
  - Total: 8.02 km^{2} (3.10 sq mi)
- Elevation: 29 m (95 ft)

Population (2011)
  - Total: 31,681
  - Density: 3,950/km^{2} (10,200/sq mi)

Languages
  - Official: Tamil
  - Additional official: English
- Time zone: UTC+5:30 (IST)
- PINs: 600126
- Area code: +91-044
- Vehicle Registration: TN 11
- Law enforcement agency: Tambaram City Police
- Urban planning agency: Chennai Metropolitan Development Authority

Madambakkam (Tamil: [maːɖambaːkkam]) is a neighborhood in the city of Tambaram, situated within the Chennai Metropolitan Area, Tamil Nadu, India.

It borders Selaiyur in the west, Sembakkam in north and Vengaivasal in north east and Sithalapakkam in east. The area is well known for its greeneries and the centuries old Dhenupureeswarar temple. Formerly a town panchayat, it was merged into Tambaram City Municipal Corporation in 2021.

== Geography ==
Madambakkam is located at 12.903848°N 80.15861°E. It has an average elevation of 29 metres (95 feet).

== Demographics ==
Religious census
Religion	Percent(%)
Hindu	84.72%
Muslim	2.74%
Christian	11.79%
Sikh	0.07%
Buddhist	0.02%
Jain	0.07%
Other	0.5%

As of 2011 India census, Madambakkam had a population of 31,681, Males constitute 51% of the population and females 49%.

As per the religious census of 2011, Madambakkam had 84.72% Hindus, 2.74% Muslims, 11.79% Christians, 0.07% Sikhs, 0.02% Buddhists, 0.07% Jains and 0.5% following other religions/groups.

== Temple ==
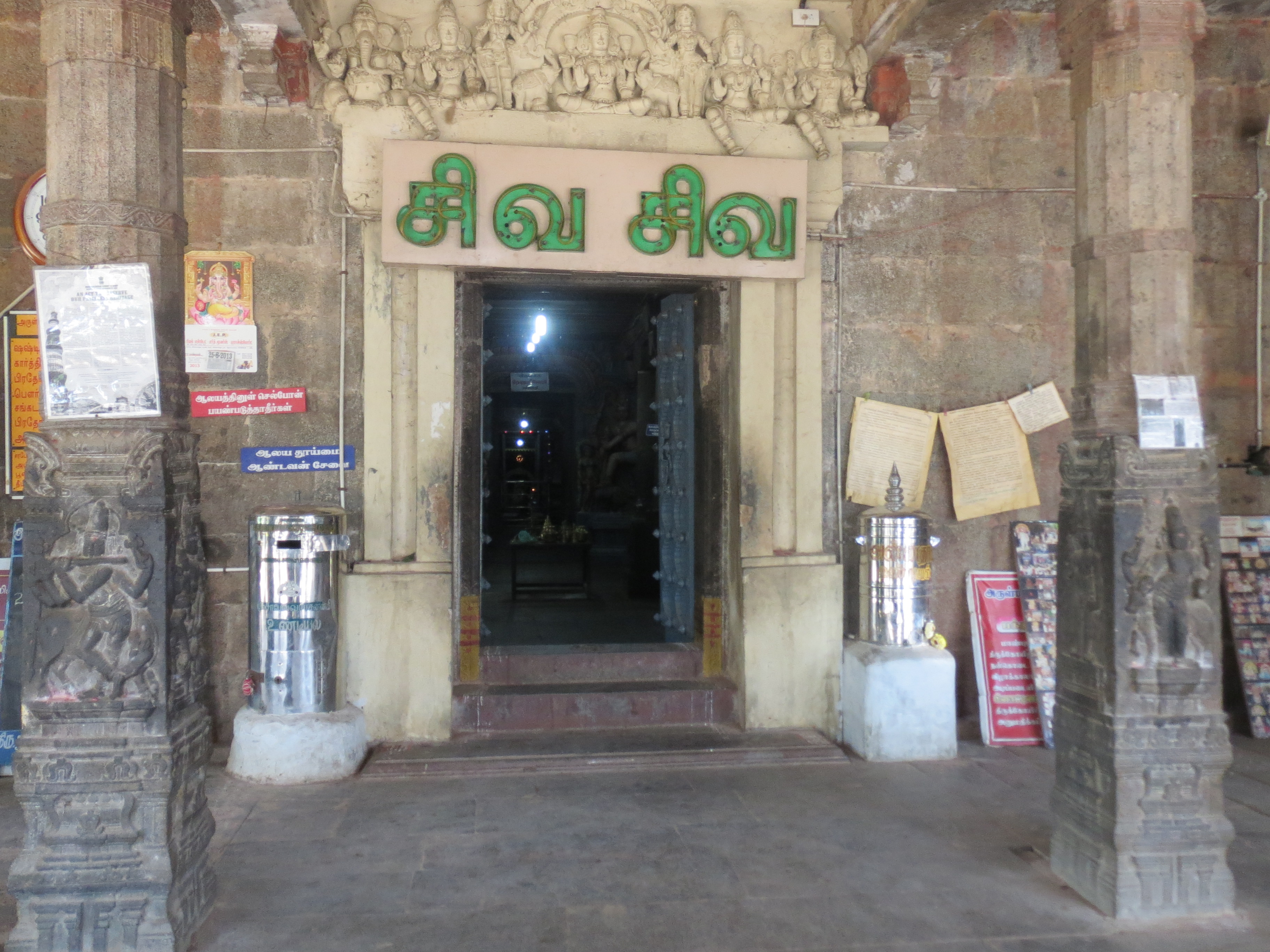
Interior view-Thenupureeswarar koil

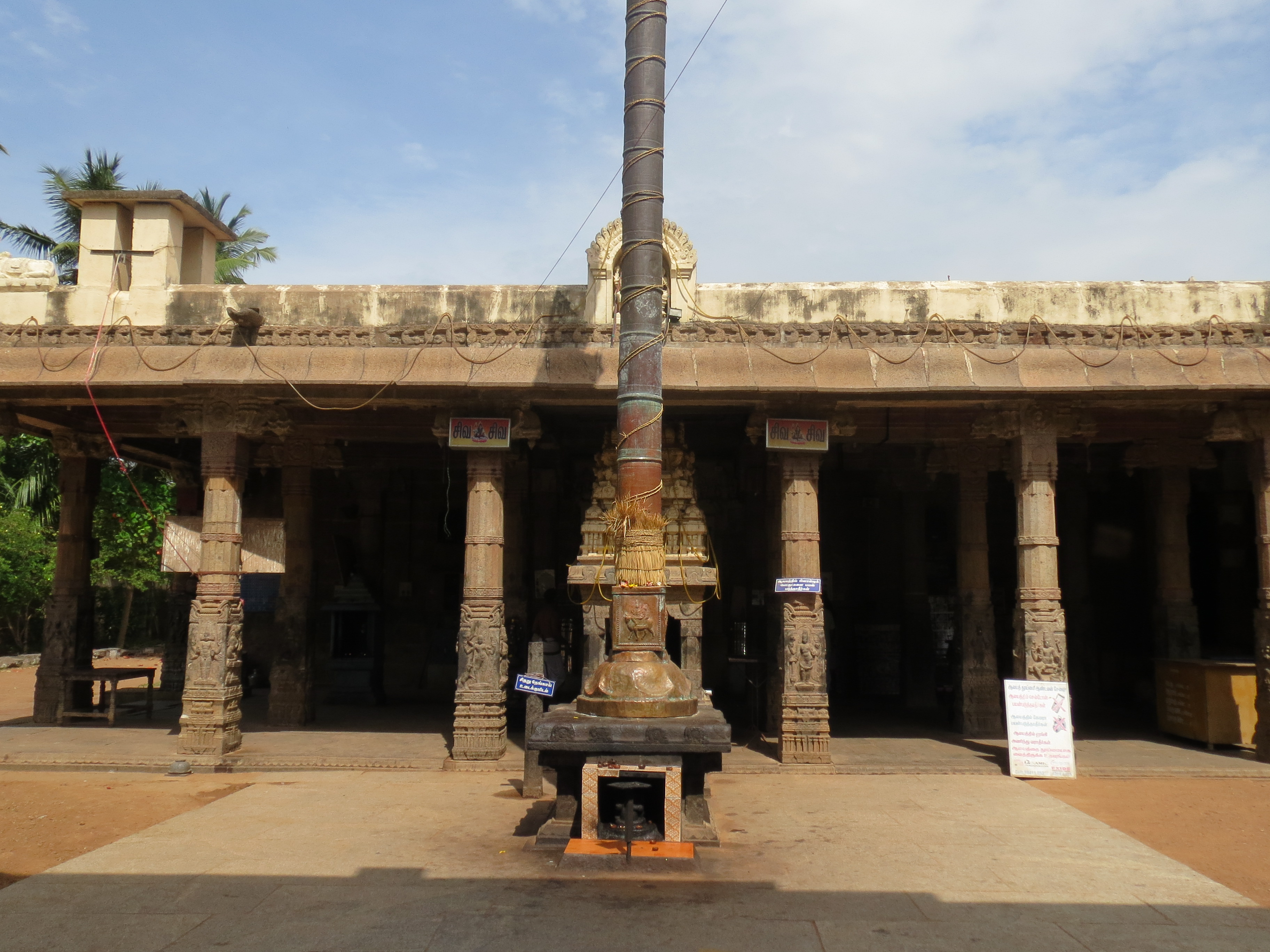
Thenupureeswarar koil kodimaram

Madambakkam is known for its historic Temple dedicated to Lord Shiva. The main deity of the temple is Lord Dhenupureeswarar. The temple is believed to be revamped during the tenure of Kulothunga Chola. The temple itself is said to have built during the period of the Parantaka Chola II (Sundara Chola), around 956–973 CE. It has sculptures and different postures of Shiva.

There is also a universal shrine for Sri Seshadriswamigal, SriChakra mahameru Lalithatripurasundari, SriGuruvayoorappan, 18 Siddars, SriNagarajar with his consorts SriNagalakshmi & SriNagavalli, and a Ghosala for cows which allows worship, irrespective of caste, creed, or religion. 18 Siddars represent the Navagrahas (each planet is represented by 2 Siddars). Siddar Havan is the most popular way of worship, wherein the individuals are permitted to perform velvi by themselves. This is also called as Navagraha Parihara Stalam. This universal shrine for worship is built by Guruji KVLN Sharmaji principle disciple of Sathguru Sri Seshadri swamigal

The temple is one of the 163 notified areas (megalithic sites) in the state of Tamil Nadu.

The Gajaprishta Vimana temple contains inscriptions ranging from the period of Cholas through Sundara Pandya to Vijayanagara kings. The inscriptions reveal that the original name of Lord Dhenupureeswarar was Sittreri Udaiya Nayanar and that of Goddess Dhenukambal was Nampirattiyar. The passageway through which visitors pass to see the main deity belongs to the Vijayanagara period.

== Tambaram Corporation ==
Madambakkam is part of Tambaram Municipal Corporation issued in G.O dated 13-1-2022. Tambaram corporation will encompass two municipalities, four town panchayats in Perungalathur, Peerkankaranai, Madambakkam and Chitlapakkam, and seven village panchayats.

The Madambakkam is chiefly a residential area [which includes Military, Navy & Airforce settlements].

== Schools ==
The neighbourhood has a panchayat union primary school and a government higher secondary school, besides many private schools such as Zion Matriculation Higher Secondary School, Kendriya Vidyalaya (two branches), Alwin Memorial Public School (Zion Group), and Sri Kanchi Mahaswami Vidya Mandir.

== RTO ==
The Madambakkam RTO previously used TN-22-xx-XXXX (MEENAMBAKKAM - Alandur), but currently using TN-11-xx-XXXX (Tambaram).

== Church ==
Sacred Heart of Jesus Church(Catholic) - St. Joseph monastery(OCD Fathers) is located at Valan Nagar, Madambakkam, Chennai, 600126, Tamil Nadu.

A Pentecostal Church is located on Mohan Nagar Main St, Mohan Nagar, Madambakkam, Chennai, Tamil Nadu.

== Masjid ==
- Madeena Masjid - Maruthi Nagar, Madambakkam
- Masjid - Mohan Nagar, Madambakkam

== Madambakkam weather Vlogger : ==
- The most prominent weather vlogger and storm-chasing creator based in Madambakkam is Mughesh. K,
- who frequently tracks and documents sudden thunderstorms, lightning strikes, and rainfall around the region.
- You can catch his weather updates and sky photography on his https://www.instagram.com/snaps_by_mughesh?igsh=MXcxbTJnazFlNHh6aQ== and https://www.instagram.com/stormchasingmbk?igsh=ZnY2d3BmY3Y1aWFz
