= Tambaram Sanatorium railway station =

Railway station in Tamil Nadu, India

Tambaram Sanatorium
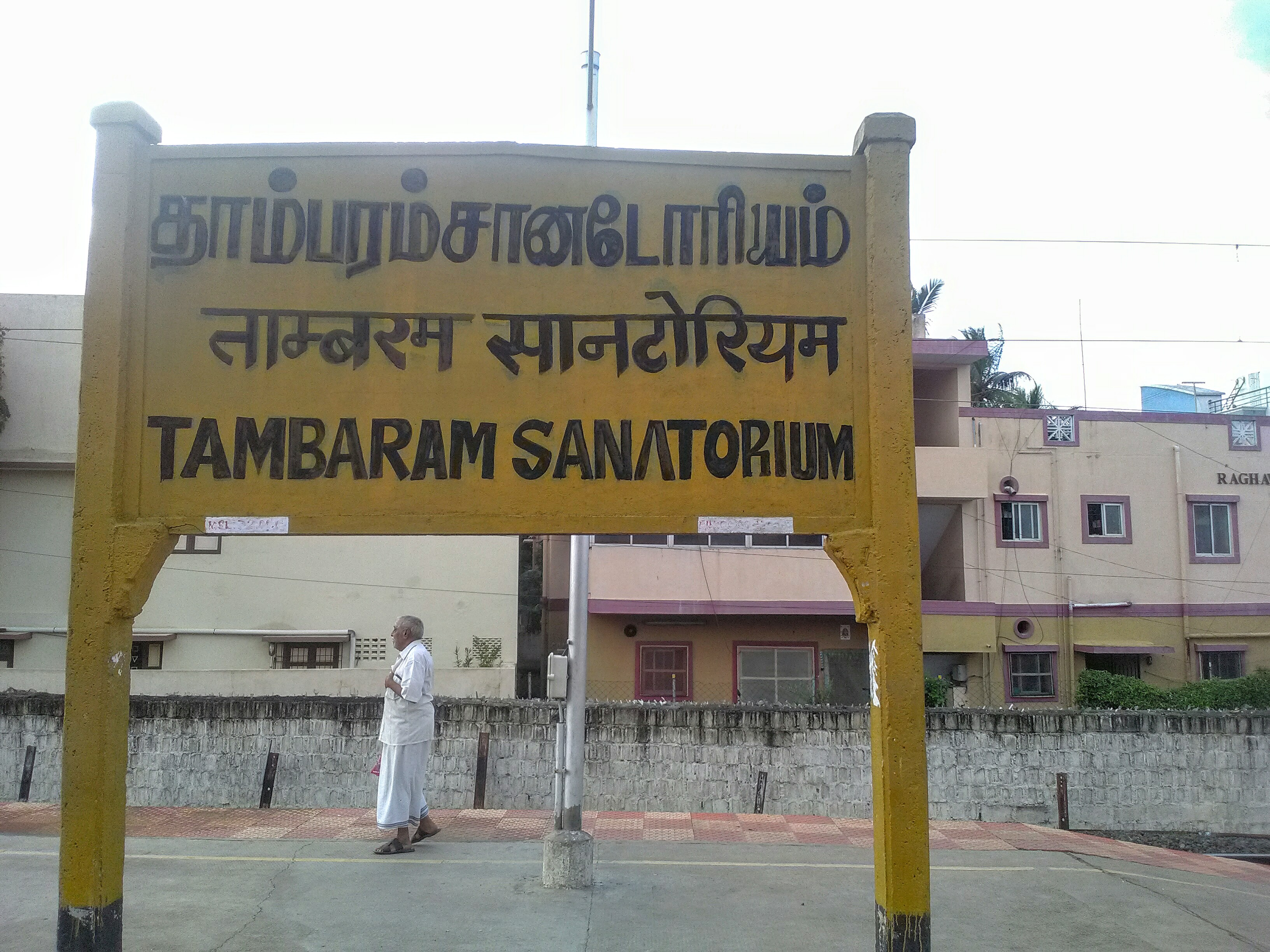

General information
- Location: Meenakshi Street, Kamakoti Nagar, Tambaram Sanatorium, Tambaram, Tamil Nadu 600 047, India
- Coordinates: 12°56′13″N 80°7′50″E
- System: Indian Railways and Chennai Suburban Railway station
- Owner: Ministry of Railways, Indian Railways
- Lines: South and South West lines of Chennai Suburban Railway

Construction
- Structure type: Standard on-ground station
- Parking: Available

Other information
- Status: Active
- Station code: TBMS
- Fare zone: Southern Railways

History
- Opened: Early 1900s
- Electrified: 15 November 1931
- Former names: South Indian Railway

Services
| Preceding station | Chennai Suburban | Following station |
|---|---|---|
| Chromepet towards Chennai Beach | South Line | Tambaram towards Tambaram, Chengalpattu Junction or Villupuram Junction |
Route map
Chennai Beach — Villupuram
Location

Tambaram Sanatorium railway station is one of the railway stations of the Chennai Beach–Chengelpet section of the Chennai Suburban Railway Network. It serves the neighbourhood of Tambaram Sanatorium and surrounding areas. It is situated about 27 km from Chennai Beach and has an elevation of 32 m (105 ft) above sea level.

== History ==
Tambaram Sanatorium railway station lies on the Madras Beach—Tambaram suburban section of the Chennai Suburban Railway, which was opened to traffic on 11 May 1931. The tracks were electrified on 15 November 1931. The section was converted to 25 kV AC traction on 15 January 1967. However, the station was built much later. When the Government Hospital of Thoracic Medicine expanded in the 1970s and gained importance, the railway station was built to serve the locality.

== The station ==
=== Platforms ===
There are a total of 4 platforms and 4 tracks. The platforms are connected by a foot overbridge. These platforms are built to accumulate 24 coaches per express train. The platforms are equipped with modern facilities like display board for the arrival and departure of trains.

=== Station layout ===
| G | Street level | Exit/Entrance & ticket counter |
| P1 | FOB, Side platform | Doors will open on the left |
| P1 | Platform 1 | Towards → Chennai Beach; Next Station: Chromepet |
| P1 | FOB, Island platform | P1 Doors will open on the left/right | P2 Doors will open on the right |
| P1 | Platform 2 | Towards ← Tambaram / Chengalpattu Jn / Villuppuram Jn; Next Station: Tambaram |
| P1 | Platform 3 | Towards → Chennai Egmore |
| P1 | FOB, Island platform | P3 and P4 | (Express Lines) |
| P1 | Platform 4 | Towards ← Chengalpattu Junction |
| P1 |

== Safety ==
The stretch along the station is considered one of the deadliest accident zones in the Guindy–Chengalpet stretch of the suburban section, with about 15 accidents occurring every month as of 2011 in the Chromepet–Tambaram stretch.

== See also ==
- Chennai Suburban Railway
- Railway stations in Chennai
