= Tambaram Sanatorium =

Suburb of Chennai, India

Coordinates: 12.937363°N 80.128162°E

Tambaram Sanatorium is a southern suburb of Chennai, India. Located between Chromepet and Tambaram, the neighbourhood is served by Tambaram Sanatorium railway station on the Chennai Beach–Villupuram section via Tambaram of the Chennai suburban railway.

== Etymology ==
Tambaram Sanatorium received its name from the Government Sanatorium hospital, a Government Hospital for Thoracic Medicine started in 1928.

== History ==
The Tambaram Sanatorium railway station today has been replaced a hospital which was founded by Dr. David Jacob Aron Chowry-Muthu.

Dr. Muthu, born in 1864, left behind scant details about his early life. He ventured to England to pursue a career in medicine and, by the 1890s, had earned the titles of MD and MRCS. Overcoming the racial bias and becoming one of the earliest Indians to settle in England must have been an immense challenge. Yet, he exceeded expectations. By 1891, he had adopted the name Chowry-Muthu and had courted and married a British woman named Margaret Fox, who hailed from a respected medical family. In 1892, he founded the Indian Christian Society of Great Britain, aiming to assist his fellow Indians in settling in England.

Dr. Chowry-Muthu specialized in the treatment of pulmonary tuberculosis, even before the advent of the BCG vaccine. He staunchly advocated the healing properties of open-air environments and clean surroundings for combating this dreaded disease, necessitating the isolation of patients in sanatoria. By the early 1900s, he assumed the role of Physician-in-Charge at the Inglewood Sanatorium on the Isle of Wight. Around 1910, he established the Hill Grove sanatorium in Mendip Hills, Somerset. In 1917, he briefly attended to a high-profile patient, the mathematician Srinivasa Ramanujan, whom he had met during their voyage from India to England in 1914.

Dr. Chowry-Muthu had influential acquaintances, including Mahatma Gandhi, who shared his views on the healing power of nature. Possibly influenced by Gandhi, Dr. Chowry-Muthu began spending more time in India from 1920 onwards. It was during this time that he conceived the idea of creating a sanatorium for tuberculosis patients. He acquired 250 acres of land in Tambaram, and on April 9, 1928, the Sanatorium with 12 beds was inaugurated by Sir CP Ramaswami Aiyar. Tragically, the same year, his wife died in England. By 1930, he expressed his desire to return and requested the Government to acquire the sanatorium. In 1937, with a sympathetic Congress ministry in place, this request was granted. Notably, one of the early patients following the Government's acquisition was a student at the Law College, VR Krishna Iyer, who not only recovered but also went on to have an illustrious career in law and politics, still thriving at the age of 98!

In 1946, the Government expanded the sanatorium to accommodate 750 beds. With the advent of the BCG vaccine in the 1960s, sanatoria became obsolete, and the Tambaram facility evolved into a hospital for terminally ill TB patients. In 1986, it was rebranded as the Government Hospital of Thoracic Medicine, and in 1993, it became the first facility to admit patients afflicted with HIV.

Following his return to England, Dr. Chowry-Muthu became a reliable source for local newspapers on matters pertaining to India, especially Gandhi. In 1931, he authored "The Antiquities of Hindu Medicine and Civilization." Unfortunately, the exact date of his death remains unknown.

== Government Hospitals ==
National Institute of Siddha is a premier institute of Siddha Medicine situated at the Tambaram Sanatorium.

The Government Hospital of Thoracic Medicine, popularly known as TB Sanatorium, was started in 1928. It is located along the Grand Southern Trunk Road.
