= David Jacob Aaron Chowry-Muthu =

Indian doctor and hospital founder (born 1864)

David Jacob Aaron Chowry Muthu
- Born: 1864
- Education: MD MRCS
- Medical career
- Sub-specialties: Pulmonary Tuberculosis
- Research: Tuberculosis
- Notable works: Establishment of Hill Grove sanatorium at Mendip Hills, Somerset; Establishment of Sanatorium at Tambaram, Chennai, Tamil Nadu

David Jacob Aaron Chowry Muthu was born in 1864 in India. He went to England to qualify in medicine and had, by the 1890s, got MD and MRCS.

Chowry-Muthu established the Hill Grove sanatorium at Mendip Hills, Somerset, England in the 1910s. An innovative feature of his practice was the use of walks of increasing length to aid in the recovery of patients.

In 1928, he established 12-bed sanatorium hospitals on 250 acres of land in Tambaram, Chennai, India. This was the first sanatorium hospital in India.

Following his wife's death in 1930, he requested the government to acquire the sanatorium and moved back to England.

== Works ==
His notable medical books / journals include:

- Muthu, David C. (1922). Pulmonary Tuberculosis: Its Etiology and Treatment. London: Baillere, Tindall and Cox.
- Burton-Fanning, Frederick William; Moore, John William; Chowry-Muthu, D. J.; Kingscote, Ernest; Calwell, William; Walker, Jane Harriet; Colebrook, Esther Lillie; Sommerville, David (1900). "A Discussion On The Therapeutics Of Open Air". The British Medical Journal. 2 (2076): 1095–1097. JSTOR 20266004.
- Chowry-Muthu, D. J. (July 1, 1905). "The Sanatorium Treatment of Consumption: Is It Worth While?". Br Med J. 2 (2322): 46. doi:10.1136/bmj.2.2322.46. PMC 2321568. S2CID 60516463 – via www.bmj.com.
- Muthu, D. J. Chowry (March 21, 1907). "The Sanatorium Treatment of Pulmonary Tuberculosis-Is It a Success?". Bristol Medico-Chirurgical Journal (1883). 25 (95): 50–54. PMC 5046717. PMID 28896882.
