= Chromepet =

Suburb of Chennai, India

Chrompet
- Suburb of Chennai
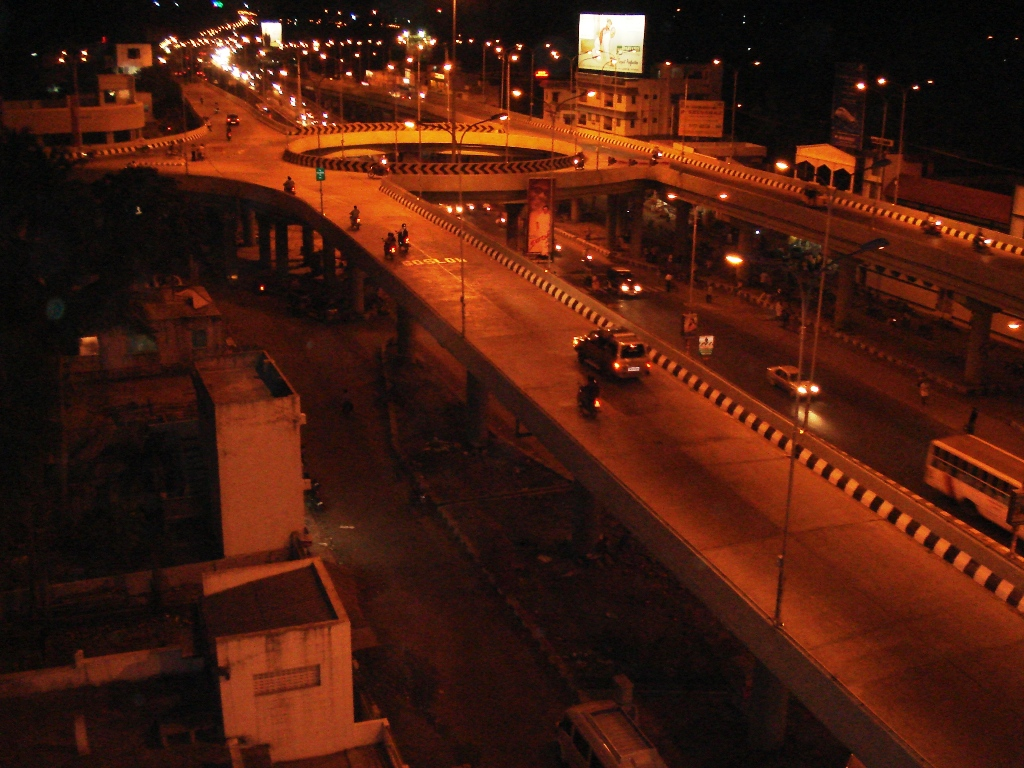
- MIT Flyover on GST road

- Chrompet, Tamil Nadu
- Coordinates: 12.951600°N 80.146200°E
- Country: India
- State: Tamil Nadu
- District: Chengalpattu
- Metro: Chennai
- Elevation: 49 m (161 ft)

Languages
  - Official: Tamil
- Time zone: UTC+5:30 (IST)
- PIN: 600044
- Vehicle registration: TN-11 (Tambaram)
- Planning agency: CMDA
- Civic agency: Tambaram Municipal Corporation
- Website: Tambaram City Municipal Corporation-Pallavapuram office

Chrompet is a suburb located in the southern part of Chennai, India. It is situated around 22 km from the Chennai Central Railway Station and 4 km south of the Chennai International Airport on the Grand Southern Trunk (GST road). Formerly a part of Pallavaram Municipality, it is now governed by the Tambaram City Municipal Corporation.Neighbouring areas include Thirumudivakkam, Tambaram, and Pallavaram. The 200-feet road connects Chromepet with Thoraipakkam.

The neighbourhood is home to the Madras Institute of Technology, whose alumni include former president of India A. P. J. Abdul Kalam and Tamil writer Sujatha. The neighbourhood is served by the Chromepet railway station of the Chennai Suburban Railway Network and is a residential locality. Chrompet votes for the Sriperumbudur parliamentary constituency in the Indian national elections.

== Etymology ==
Chromepet is a Tanglish portmanteau, not a pure Tamil name. Earlier, the town was the home of Chrome Leathers, hence the name Chromepet, and pettai (Tamil: பேட்டை means suburb). The Balaji Hospital now stands on the grounds of the factory.

== History ==
Together with Pallavaram, the Chromepet area was referred to as "Pallavapuram." The area was part of Thondaimandalam ruled by Thondaimaans who were allied with the early Cholas from around the 1st to 2nd century CE. Later, the area was passed on to the chieftains of the Satavahanas. Chennai, Chengalpet, and the surrounding areas belonged to the Thondai Nadu during the Pallava period (3rd to 7th century CE). The historic period proper begins with the Pallava kings and the earliest of their stone inscriptions is found nearby in Pallavaram (Pallava Puram) in a cave temple excavated by Mahendravarman I (600–630 CE). Narasimhavarman I who succeeded Mahendravarman I waged battles against Pulekesin of the Chalukya dynasty and defeated him at Manimangalam, which is 11 km (6.8 mi) south-west of Chromepet.

=== Chola period ===
During the later Chola period (9th to 12th century CE) the area, which is now called Chromepet, belonged to the Churathur Nadu, named after Thiruchuram, the modern Trisulam village near Pallavaram. The Churathur Nadu extended from Tambaram in the south to Adambakkam and Alandur in the north and included Pammal, Pallavaram and Tiruneermalai.

=== Pandya, Chola, Vijayanagar ===
Later the lands passed on to Pandya, Chola and the Vijayanagar dynasties between the 12th and 15th centuries.

=== British rule ===
During the British rule in the 18th century, the leather industries developed in the southwest part of the city. The Chrome Leather Company was established in this area in 1912 by European merchant Alexander Chambers. After his lifetime, the Chrome Leather Company was run by his wife Ida L. Chambers. She became the sole owner of the Chrome Leather Company and its properties in 1965 through an Order and Decree passed by the Honourable Court, Madras. She died in 1968.

Today the lands and properties of Chrome Leather Company belong to the late Ida L. Chambers, and most of the land to the west of the railway station is owned by CLC.

After independence, the Madras Institute of Technology (MIT) was founded in 1949 in an area extending over 20 hectares at Chromepet. Residential and commercial development started in the 1960s. Kulasekarapuram is the name of the area before MIT was established.

=== Post-Independence ===
Development of New Colony and the auction of residential lots in the early 1950s, by the Chrome Leather Company, led to rapid residential and commercial development of the Chromepet area.

== Neighbourhood newspapers ==
- GST Road News
- Chrompet Times
- Chrompet Talk

== Transportation links ==
Chromepet railway station provides commuter rail connection to Chennai and Tambaram.

Chromepet is 3 km away from Chennai Airport. The Pallavaram – Perungudi bypass road connects Chromepet with Adambakkam, Nanganallur, Madipakkam, Medavakkam, Velacheri and Perungudi. Chitlapakkam main road connects Chromepet with Selaiyur and East Tambaram.

The Grand Southern Trunk Road (GST) that connects south Indian cities to Chennai passes through this township.

The MIT Flyover connects Grand Southern Trunk Road (GST) with Hasthinapuram and Chitlapakkam. The Flyover (near Ponds company) connects Tiruneermalai on the west and Thoraipakkam 100 feet outer ring road with the GST.

There is a bus stand in Hasthinapuram, a neighborhood on the eastern side of Chromepet Railway Station. Buses to Tambaram, Guduvanchery, T. Nagar, High Court, Chengalpet, Avadi, Pallavaram, Velachery, Vandalur, Pozhichalur, Broadway, etc. are available from Hasthinapuram.

There is a bus stop in Grant Southern Trunk Road (GST). There is also a Metropolitan Transportation Corporation Chennai (MTC) bus building centre and MTC bus depot on the east side of Chromepet.

=== Cultural Academy ===
Chromepet is home to the Chromepet Cultural Academy. Occasionally there will be Carnatic Kacheries performed in the academy. Experts from other places in Chennai come to sing songs during the 'margazhi utsav'.

== Economy and Commercial Significance ==
Chromepet has emerged as one of the most significant commercial powerhouses in South Chennai. Due to its massive concentration of high-density retail establishments and heavy daily footfall, the locality is frequently compared to T. Nagar, the city's primary commercial hub. The stretch of the Grand Southern Trunk (GST) Road passing through Chromepet has evolved into a major shopping corridor, hosting some of the largest retail complexes in Tamil Nadu.

=== Retail and Shopping Hub ===
The commercial landscape is dominated by massive multi-story retail showrooms and national chains, making it a central shopping destination for the southern suburbs:

- Major Retailers: The area features massive outlets of Saravana Stores (Gold Palace and Elite), Pothys, The Chennai Silks, and Jayachandran Textiles.
- Fashion & Lifestyle: National and international retail giants such as Max Fashion, Reliance Trends, Zudio, Pantaloons, and Westside maintain a large-scale presence here.
- Electronics and Digital: Extensive showrooms including Reliance Digital, Croma, Poorvika, and Sangeetha Gadgets are located along the GST Road.
- Jewellery Corridor: A primary hub for gold and diamond retail, featuring GRT Jewellers, Prince Jewellery, Joyalukkas, Lalithaa Jewellery, and Malabar Gold and Diamonds.

=== Healthcare Infrastructure ===
Chromepet is recognized as a premier international destination for multi-speciality healthcare and medical tourism:

- Dr. Rela Institute & Medical Centre: A world-class quaternary care hospital and a global leader in liver transplantation.
- Sree Balaji Medical College and Hospital: A massive multi-speciality teaching hospital and research center.
- Other Major Institutions: The locality is served by several other multi-speciality facilities including Sugam Hospital, Parvathy Hospital (specializing in orthopaedics and trauma), Royal Balaji Hospital, and Kavitha Ortho & Multispeciality Hospital.

=== Dining and Entertainment ===
The commercial density is supported by a large-scale food and entertainment ecosystem:

- Multiplexes: Vettri Theatres (a prominent 4K RGB Laser multiplex) and Varadharaja Cinemas serve as major entertainment landmarks.
- Dining: Massive outlets of prominent chains such as Adyar Ananda Bhavan (A2B), Sangeetha Veg Restaurant, Dindigul Thalappakatti, Starbucks, KFC, and Pizza Hut are situated in the heart of the commercial zone.
