= Kamarajapuram, Anakaputhur =

Kamarajapuram காமராஜபுரம் (Tamil)
- Neighbourhood
- Location within Chennai
- Coordinates: 12.972271°N 80.122949°E
- Country: India
- State: Tamil Nadu
- Region: Pallava Nadu, Tondai Nadu
- District: Chengalpattu
- Taluk: Pallavaram
- City: Tambaram
- Time zone: UTC+5:30 (IST)
- Pincode: 600070
- Telephone code: +91-44 2248 xxxx
- Vehicle registration: TN-85
- Civic Governing Body: Tambaram City Municipal Corporation
- Administrative Zone: Zone 1 (Pammal Zone)
- Law enforcement: Tambaram City Police (T-4 Sankar Nagar Station)
- Parliamentary Constituency: Sriperumbudur
- Assembly Constituency: Pallavaram

Kamarajapuram (also referred to as Pammal Kamarajapuram) is a residential neighborhood in the western part of Tambaram city, located within the Chennai Metropolitan Area in Tamil Nadu, India.

== Administration ==
Initially part of the erstwhile Anakaputhur Municipality, the neighborhood was brought under the administration of the Tambaram City Municipal Corporation following municipal integration in November 2021. Administratively, the locality falls under Zone 1 (Pammal Zone) of the corporation and is represented across Wards 4 and 5.

Law and order in the locality are maintained by the T-4 Sankar Nagar Police Station, which operates under the jurisdiction of the Tambaram City Police Commissionerate.

== History and Demographics ==
A significant portion of the local population traces its roots to families who migrated from the Tirunelveli district to this area approximately 150 years ago. This migration was heavily influenced by the search for employment in the expanding regional trade and local industries of the Chennai periphery. Today, the community is predominantly characterized by small business owners and commercial entrepreneurs, operating within a mid-income real estate segment.

== Geography and Topography ==
The locality is geographically defined by its proximity to the adjacent neighborhoods of Pammal, Anakaputhur, and Sembakkam. A major geographical and tourist landmark in Kamarajapuram is the Sengalneer Malai, a popular local mountain and hillock formation visited by both tourists and residents.

== Culture and Religion ==
The neighborhood exhibits a multi-religious demographic setup. Key religious landmarks include:

- St. Antony's Church: A prominent local Catholic parish. The church coordinates an annual feast every June, drawing significant local participation.
- Old Mutharamman Kovil: A historic local temple serving the Hindu community of the neighborhood.

== Healthcare and Education ==
Kamarajapuram is served by several primary medical facilities and educational institutions. St. Antony's High School is the primary educational landmark in the area, established to provide accessible education to marginalized groups, inspired by the educational reforms of former Chief Minister K. Kamaraj.

Medical and Educational Facilities
Name	Facility Type
Sree Balaji Clinic	General Practice
Pammal Nallam Hospital	Multi-Specialty
Chellam Super Speciality Center	Medical Center
St. Antony's High School	State Board School
Shanthinikethan Matriculation Higher Secondary	State Board School

== Sports ==
Volleyball is the predominant sport in the locality. The neighborhood is represented in regional tournaments by the Pallavapuram Kamarajapuram Volleyball Club (P.M.V.C.). The local sports culture is supported by the PMVC Volleyball Ground, a registered sports facility located in the Sankar Nagar-Pammal area that serves as a primary hub for athletes and fitness enthusiasts.

== Transport and Connectivity ==
Kamarajapuram is strategically positioned with sound road connectivity to popular IT hubs, making it a prominent residential zone. The Madras Export Processing Zone (MEPZ) in Tambaram is located approximately 7 km away, while the ELCOT SEZ and IT firms in Thoraipakkam are accessible within 10 to 12 km.

The neighborhood is linked via the local road networks of Anakaputhur and Pammal, connecting directly to the Grand Southern Trunk Road (GST Road) and Velachery Road.

=== Public Transit ===
- Bus: The neighborhood is serviced by the MTC. Boarding points include the Kamarajapuram local bus stop, with the Hasthinapuram MTC Terminus acting as a major nearby transit hub. Route S69 (Mini Bus) connects the Chennai International Airport Metro to Pammal and Anakaputhur.
- Rail: The nearest rail transit nodes are the Chromepet railway station (approx. 6 km away) and the Pallavaram railway station on the Chennai Suburban Railway Network.
- Aviation: The neighborhood connects to the Chennai International Airport within 10 km via the Grand Southern Trunk Road.
