= Pallavaram taluk =

Pallavaram பல்லாவரம்
- Taluk
- Pallavaram Taluk
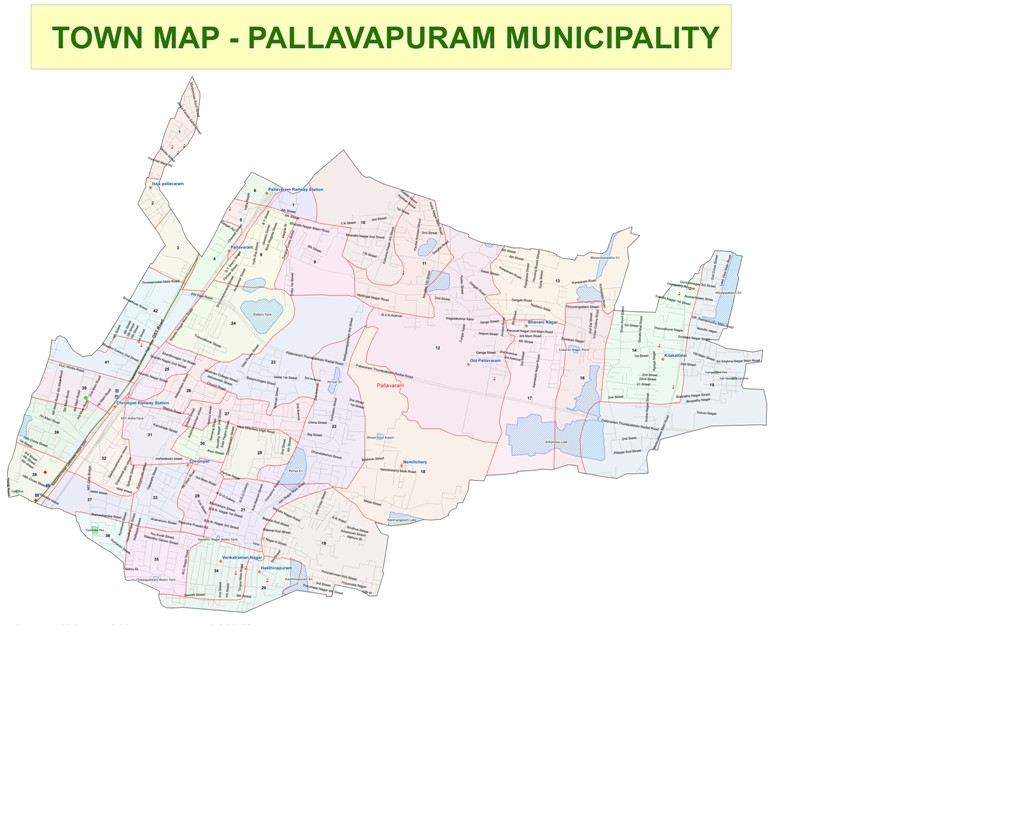
- Pallavaram Taluk Building; Kurinji Nagar, Pallavaram–Thuraipakkam Radial Road; Chennai – 600 044
- Country: India
- State: Tamil Nadu
- District: Chengalpattu
- Revenue Division: Tambaram
- Established: 2015
- Headquarters: Kurinji Nagar
- Subdivisions: Firkas (2): Pallavaram, Pammal; Revenue Villages: 13

Government
  - District Administration: Collector of Chengalpattu
  - Revenue Administration: Tahsildar, Pallavaram

Area
  - Total: 40.16 km^{2} (15.51 sq mi)

Population (2011)
  - Total: 582,783
  - Density: 14,510/km^{2} (37,580/sq mi)
- Time zone: UTC+5:30 (IST)
- PIN: 600016, 600027, 600043, 600044, 600070, 600074, 600075, 600091, 600117, 600132
- Vehicle registration: TN-11, TN-22, TN-85
- Civic Administration: Tambaram City Municipal Corporation; St. Thomas Mount Cantonment Board
- Police Jurisdiction: Greater Chennai Police; Tambaram City Police
- Planning Agency: Chennai Metropolitan Development Authority (CMDA)

Pallavaram taluk is a taluk in the Tambaram division of the Chengalpattu district in Tamil Nadu, India. Its headquarters is located in Kurinji Nagar on the Pallavaram–Thuraipakkam Radial Road. It shares its boundaries with the Alandur taluk in Chennai district to the north, Kundrathur Taluk in Kanchipuram district to the west, and Sholinganallur taluk in Chennai district to the east.

== History and formation ==
Pallavaram Taluk was created in 2015 by bifurcating the older Alandur Taluk. In 2018, when areas under Alandur Taluk were annexed by Chennai District, revenue villages that were not under the Greater Chennai Corporation were transferred to Pallavaram Taluk. At that time, Pallavaram Taluk contained four revenue blocks: Pallavaram, Pammal, Kundrathur, and Mangadu.

In November 2019, the Chengalpattu district was carved out from the Kancheepuram district. Kundrathur taluk was newly created out of the Kundrathur and Mangadu revenue blocks and remained under Kancheepuram District. Pallavaram Taluk was moved to the newly formed Chengalpattu District.

The total area of Pallavaram was originally 100 km^{2}. Following the 2019 bifurcation, the total area of Pallavaram Taluk was reduced to 40.16 km^{2}, encompassing only the Pallavaram and Pammal revenue blocks.

== Geography and subdivisions ==
Currently, Pallavaram Taluk comprises 13 revenue villages organized into 2 firkas.

=== Pallavaram Firka ===
The Pallavaram Firka includes:

- Cantonment Pallavaram
- Essa Pallavaram
- Hasthinapuram
- Keelkattalai
- Meenambakkam Cantonment
- Moovarasampattu
- Nemilichery
- St. Thomas Mount Cantonment
- Tirusulam
- Zamin Pallavaram

=== Pammal Firka ===
The Pammal Firka includes:

- Anakaputhur
- Cowl Bazaar
- Pammal
- Pozhichalur
- Thiruneermalai

== Demographics and civic administration ==
Pallavaram Taluk was created in 2015. Official standalone demographic configurations are maintained in alignment with the 2011 census schedules, which record a population of 582,783 for the constituent areas.

In January 2025, the Tambaram City Municipal Corporation expanded its boundaries. This brought several areas in the taluk, such as Pozhichalur, Thiruneermalai, Keelkattalai, and Cowl Bazaar, completely inside the corporation's civic boundary, replacing older village panchayat administrations for civic services.

== Infrastructure updates ==
As of 2026, Pallavaram Taluk is a major node for real estate and infrastructure development in South Chennai. Major ongoing infrastructure projects include the widening of the Poonamallee–Kundrathur Road, the planned Pallavaram–Tambaram elevated corridor, and the extension of the Chennai Metro from the Airport to Kilambakkam, which passes directly through the taluk via the Grand Southern Trunk (GST) Road.
