= Pallavaram (disambiguation) =

Pallavaram is a major place in Chennai, Tamil Nadu, India.

Pallavaram may also refer to the following in Chennai:

- Pallavaram taluk, a taluk
- Pallavaram Lake, a lake
- Pallavaram railway station, a railway station
- Pallavaram (state assembly constituency), a state assembly constituency
- Pallavaram Friday Market, a shopping market
- Pallavaram Flyover, a bridge
