= Gerugambakkam =

Gerugambakkam, Chennai
- suburb of Chennai
- Nickname: Gerugai
- Gerugambakkam(Chennai) Gerugambakkam, Chennai (Tamil Nadu) Gerugambakkam, Chennai (India)
- Coordinates: 13.013304°N 80.143037°E
- Country: India
- State: Tamil Nadu
- District: Kanchipuram
- Taluk: Kundrathur
- Metro: Chennai

Population (2011)
  - Total: 11,551

Languages
  - Official: Tamil
- Time zone: UTC+5:30 (IST)
- Postal code: 600 128
- Vehicle registration: TN 85 (RTO, Kundrathur )

Gerugambakkam is a residential-industrial neighborhood in the south-western part of Chennai, India. It belongs to the Kundrathur taluk of Kanchipuram District, Tamil Nadu, India. It forms a suburb of Chennai city.

== Location ==
Gerugambakkam is located in South West Chennai, 4 kilometres away from the Porur junction on the Kundrathur road surrounded by Moulivakkam, Kolapakkam in the North and Kovur to the South. Other neighboring areas include Porur, Mangadu, Valasaravakkam, Iyyapanthangal, Kundrathur.

== Demographics ==
As of 2011 census, Gerugambakkam had a total population of 11,551 with 5,949 males and 5,602 females. The sex ratio was 942 against state average of 996. Population of Children with age of 0-6 is 1445 which is 12.51% of total population of Gerugambakkam. The Child Sex Ratio in Gerugambakkam was around 841 compared to the Tamil Nadu state average of 943. The Literacy rate was 88.93%, higher than state average of 80.09%. The Male literacy is around 92.87% while female literacy rate is 84.80%. Gerugambakkam belongs to Alandur State Assembly Constituency which comes under Sriperumbudur Lok Sabha Constituency Gerugambakkam is a village that falls under the Kundrathur Panchayat Union in the Kanchipuram district of Tamil Nadu.

== Transportation ==
=== Chennai Metro ===
The proposed second phase of Chennai Metro has One line starting from Poonamallee to Light House. The proposed Porur Metro Station could be less than 3 kilometres from Bhai Kadai Bus Stop.

=== Railway ===
Pallavaram railway station is the nearest Railway Station, which is 7 km away from Gerugambakkam (Enroute Via Cowl Bazaar). Guindy railway station is the second nearest Railway Station, which is 8 km away from Gerugambakkam.

=== MTC ===
MTC operating Considerable fleet of buses via Gerugambakkam. Share autos as well plays a major role in transportation. The nearest Bus Depot is Iyyapanthangal which is approx 5 kilometers from Gerugambakkam. The second nearest is Kundrathur which is 6 kilometers far.

== Educational Institutions ==
As of 2016 data, Gerugambakkam has number of educational institutions including Primary, Secondary, Higher Secondary, college and Polytechnics in and around this area. Some of the famous institutions in Gerugambakkam are PSBB Millennium School, Little Flower Matriculation School & Polytechnic. Some other famous institutions like Velammal Bodhi Campus, Pon Vidyashram, Lalaji Memorial Omega International School and few more are located in adjacent area Kolapakkam.
