= Cowl Bazaar =

- Location in metropolitan Chennai
- Coordinates: 12.989°N 80.151°E
- Country: India
- State: Tamil Nadu
- Metro: Chennai
- District: Chengalpattu
- Taluk: Pallavaram

Government
  - Body: Tambaram Municipal Corporation
  - Rank: 3-4 KMS

Population (2021)
  - Total: 3,125

Languages
  - Official: Tamil
- Time zone: UTC+5:30 (IST)
- PIN: 600074
- Telephone code: 91-44-2263-XXXX
- Vehicle registration: TN-85

Cowl Bazaar is a suburb of Chennai located in the Chengalpattu district of Tamil Nadu, India. It is a village panchayat in St.Thomas Mount Block located north of Pozhichalur and west of Chennai International Airport along the banks of Adyar River. It is located about 21 kilometres (13 mi) Marina Beach and 3 km (1.9 mi) Porur. It is located closer to other major suburban areas like Pammal, Pallavaram, Anakaputhur and Kundrathur. The neighborhood is served by Pallavaram railway station of the Chennai Suburban Railway Network. The Cowl Bazaar Bridge connects Pallavaram, Pammal and Pozhichalur with Kolapakkam, Porur, Moulivakkam and Manapakkam. The Pallavaram - Kolapakkam Road connects Pallavaram with Kolapakkam via Pammal and Pozhichalur runs along Cowl Bazaar.
