= Pallavaram railway station =

Railway station in Chennai, India

Pallavaram
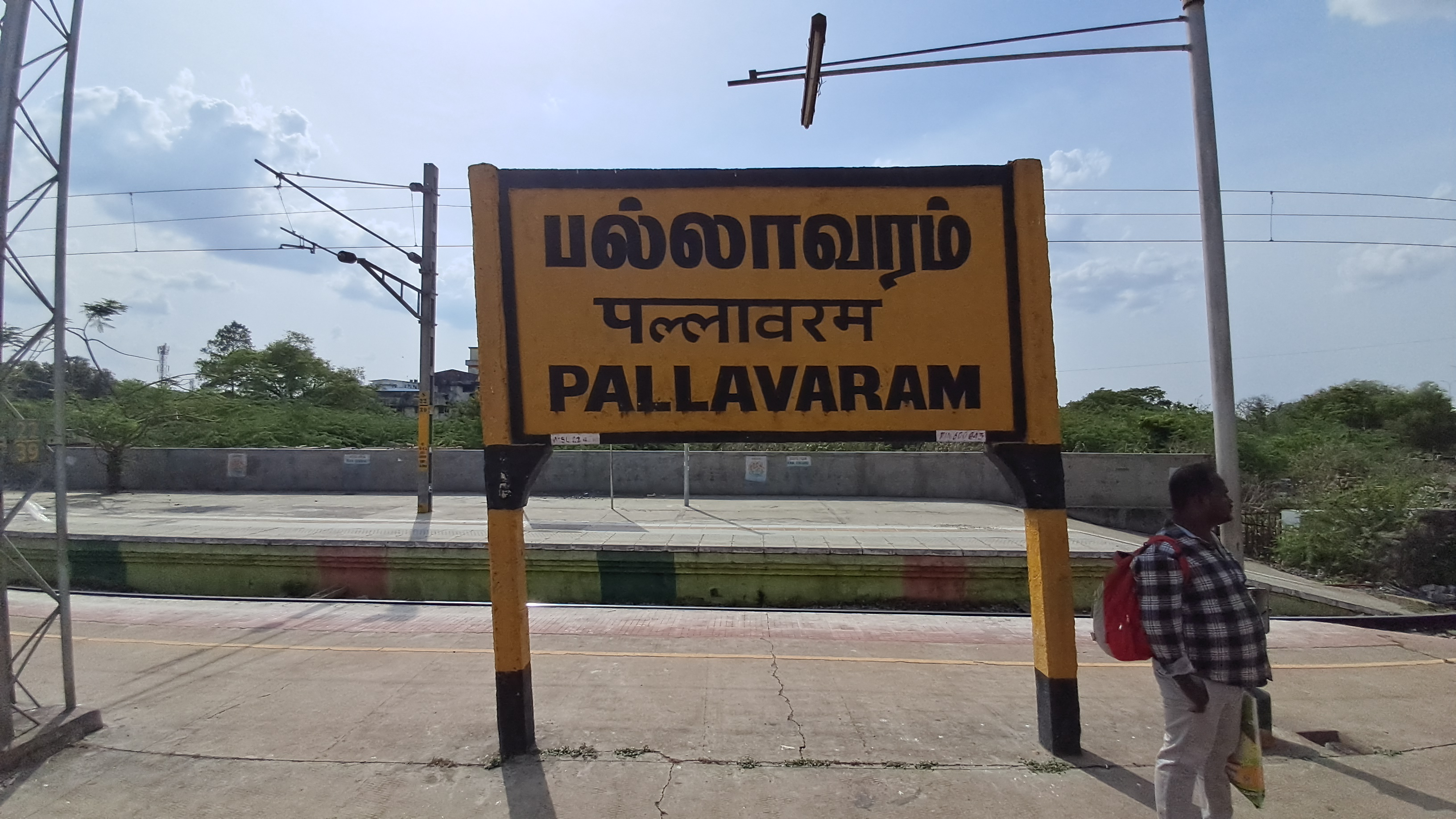
- Pallavaram railway station as of June 2025

General information
- Location: Railway Station Road, Arumalai Chavadi, Pallavaram, Chennai, Tamil Nadu 600 043, India
- Coordinates: 12°58′2″N 80°9′7″E
- System: Indian Railways and Chennai Suburban Railway station
- Owner: Ministry of Railways, Indian Railways
- Lines: South and South West lines of Chennai Suburban Railway
- Tracks: 5
- Bus operators: MTC

Construction
- Structure type: Standard on-ground station
- Parking: Available

Other information
- Station code: PV
- Fare zone: Southern Railways

History
- Opened: Early 1900s
- Electrified: 15 November 1931; 94 years ago
- Former names: South Indian Railway

Services
Preceding station	Chennai Suburban	Following station
Tirusulam towards Chennai Beach	South Line	Chromepet towards Tambaram, Chengalpattu Junction or Villupuram Junction
Route map
Chennai Beach — Villupuram
Location

Pallavaram railway station is one of the railway stations of the Chennai Beach–Chengelpet section of the Chennai Suburban Railway Network. It serves the neighbourhood of Pallavaram, Pammal, Nagalkeni, Anakaputhur, Pozhichalur, Cowl Bazaar, Kolapakkam, Gerugambakkam, Kovoor, Thandalam, Tharapakkam, Thiruneermalai, Thirumudivakkam, Kundrathur, Mangadu, and Keelkattalai. It is situated about 23 km (14 mi) from Chennai Beach, and has an elevation of 4 m (13 ft) above sea level.

== History ==
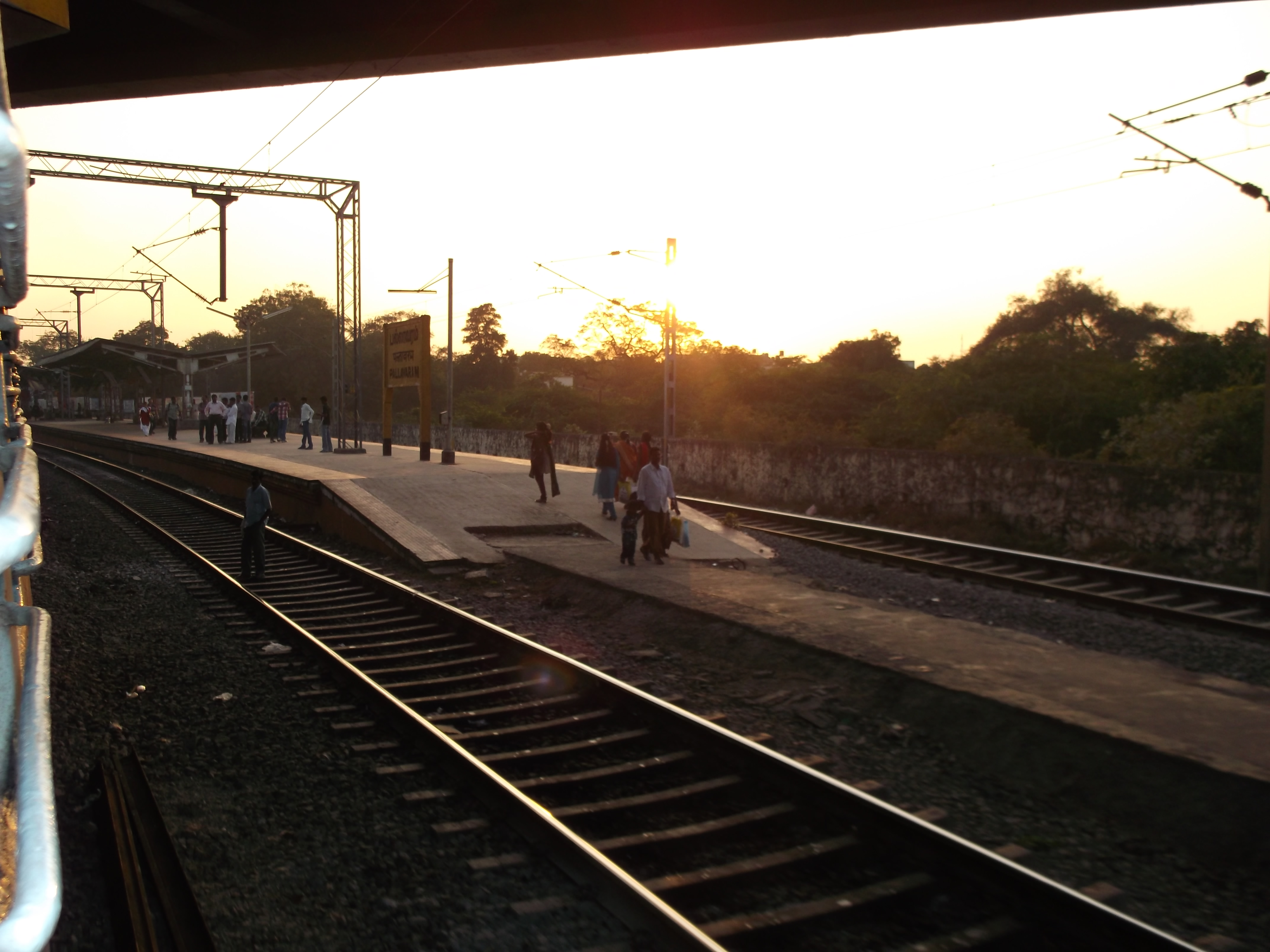
View of Pallavaram railway station

Pallavaram railway station lies on the Chennai Beach–Tambaram suburban section of the Chennai Suburban Railway, which was opened to traffic on 11 May 1931. The tracks were electrified on 15 November 1931. The section was converted to 25 kV AC traction on 15 January 1967.

Pallavaram Railway Station is one of the terminal for Southern Line of Chennai Suburban Railway Network next to Tambaram Railway Station and Chengalpattu Railway Station. During Meter Gauge several years back, Eight Peak Hour Services between Chennai Beach and Pallavaram Railway Station has been operated. Later, the services were removed after conversion to Broad Gauge.

== The station ==
=== Platforms ===
There are a total of 4 platforms and 4 tracks. The platforms are connected by foot overbridge. These platforms are built to accumulate 24 coaches express train. The platforms are equipped with modern facility like display board of arrival and departure of trains.

=== Station layout ===
G	Street level	Exit/Entrance & ticket counter
P1	FOB, Side platform | Doors will open on the left
P1	Platform 1	Towards → Chennai Beach; Next Station: Tirusulam
P1	FOB, Island platform | P1 Doors will open on the left/right | P2 Doors will open on the right
P1	Platform 2	Towards ← Tambaram / Chengalpattu Jn / Villuppuram Jn; Next Station: Chromepet
P1	Platform 3	Towards → Chennai Egmore
P1	FOB, Island platform | P3 and P4 | (Express Lines)
P1	Platform 4	Towards ← Chengalpattu Junction
P1

== Facilities ==
Pallavaram Railway Station is one of the busiest station after Tambaram, Guindy, Mambalam and Egmore in the Chennai Beach–Tambaram section.

The station is closer to Pallavaram Bus Terminus on the Grand Southern Trunk Road. The station's proximity to Friday Market and Chennai Airport also makes it one of the important station.

Currently, single special train is being operated between Chennai Beach and Pallavaram on morning session during peak hour.

RailWire WiFi services are available at the station.

Mini bus services are available from the eastern side of the station to Keelkattalai, Tirusulam Sakthi Nagar.

Double discharge platforms are available on the western side of the station.

All the level crossings are upgraded as Railway Over Bridges and Railway Under Bridges.

The Elevators are available at the western and eastern sides of the station.

== See also ==
- Chennai Suburban Railway
- Railway stations in Chennai
