= Moovarasampettai =

Moovarasanpattu
- Census Town
- Location within Chennai
- Coordinates: 12°57′50″N 80°11′26″E
- Country: India
- State: Tamil Nadu
- District: Chengalpattu

Population (2011)
  - Total: 9,672

Languages
  - Official: Tamil
- Time zone: UTC+5:30 (IST)
- Postal code: 600091

Moovarasanpattu is a census town in Chengalpattu district and part of the Chennai metropolitan area in the Indian state of Tamil Nadu.

== Demographics ==
As of 2011 India census, Moovarasanpet had a population of 9672 persons. Males constitute 50.68% of the population and females 49.32%. Moovarasanpet has an average literacy rate of 82.7%, higher than the national average of 59.5%: male literacy is 86%, and female literacy is 79.2%. This town is one of the few which has walled its town water tank to prevent it from being used for real estate development. Most neighboring towns have converted their water tanks to Public transportation stations (buses) or apartments. This area comes under St. Thomas Mount Panchayat Union. There are demands to merge with Greater Chennai Corporation for long time as near by areas like Madipakkam, Puzhuthivakkam have been merged in 2011.

== Economy ==
Moovarasanpet was considered as the hub for Quarrying, but it is banned. The main business there now is stone crushing units/crushers where trucks bring in stone loads and get them crushed as blue metals in these units. There are many people from here who work in IT industries.

== Transportation ==
Moovarasanpet is well connected by roads from Nanganallur, Tirusulam, Madipakkam, Keelkattalai, Puzhuthivakkam.

Metro

Moovarasanpet is connected by Meenambakkam metro station which comes under the Blue Line, which is a part of the Chennai Metro, was introduced in 2016. It runs between Chennai International Airport and Washermanpet, as a part of Blue Line. Moovarasanpet will also be connected through by Chennai Metro Rail Phase 2, Line 5 which will be passing through Madhavaram - Shollinganallur, the residents can connect through Puzhuthivakkam, Madipakkam Koot Road, Kilkattalai Metro Stations respectively, works is expected to start from 2021.

== Education ==
There are some of the Schools in the Moovarasanpet area

- Government Primary school
- Government Higher Secondary School
- Brilliant Matriculation Higher Secondary School
- Kalaimagal Mat. Hr. School

== See also ==
- Chennai
- Chengalpattu District
- Kilkattalai
- Madipakkam
- Puzhuthivakkam
