= Perungalathur =

Neighborhood of Tambaram, India

Perungalathur, Chennai
- Suburb of Chennai
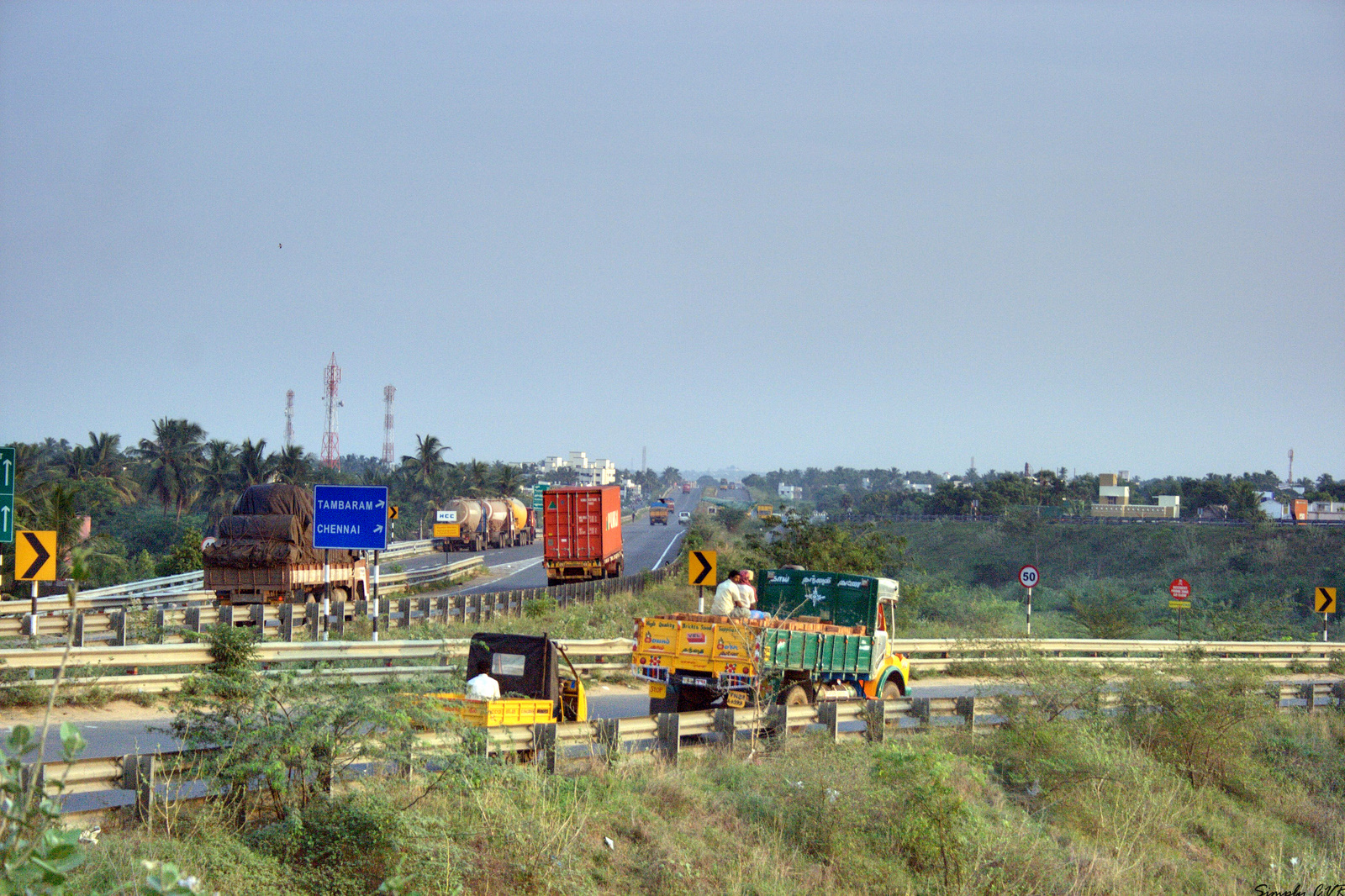
- Irumbuliyur flyover

- Location in Chennai Metropolitan Area Location in Tamil Nadu Location in India
- Coordinates: 12.9051°N 80.0948°E
- Country: India
- State: Tamil Nadu
- Metro: Chennai Metropolitan Area
- District: Chengalpattu
- City: Tambaram, Chennai City

Government
  - MP: T.R. Baalu (DMK)
  - MLA: D. Sarathkumar (TVK)
  - Corporation Commissioner: R. Alagumeena IAS
  - Mayor: K. Vasanthakumari (DMK)
  - Deputy Mayor: G. Kamaraj (DMK)

Area
  - Total: 2.95 km^{2} (1.14 sq mi)

Population (2011)
  - Total: 37,987
  - Density: 12,900/km^{2} (33,400/sq mi)

Languages
  - Official: Tamil
  - Additional official: English
- Time zone: UTC+5:30 (IST)
- PINs: 600063
- Area code: +91-044
- Vehicle Registration: TN 11
- Law enforcement agency: Tambaram City Police
- Urban planning agency: Chennai Metropolitan Development Authority

Audio of Birds from the Perungalathur Reserved Forest Path

Perungalathur (Tamil: [peɾɯŋɡaɭattuːɾ]) is a neighborhood in the city of Tambaram, South Chennai, situated within the Chennai Metropolitan Area, Tamil Nadu, India.

Formerly a Town Panchayat, it was merged into the Tambaram City Municipal Corporation in November 2021. Ancient Shiva Temple, located in Perungulathur is about 800 years old. The Kamatchi Amman Temple and Aadhi Karaneeswarar Temple are also popular.

== Demographics ==
As of 2011 India census, Perungulathur has a population of 37,342 (it is expected to be close to 50,000 in 2025). It has an almost 50/50 sex ratio.Males constitute 50.3% of the population and females 49.7%. Perungulathur has an average literacy rate of 91.36%, higher than the national average of 74.04%.The male literacy is 95.24%, and female literacy is 87.43%. In Perungulathur, 10.81% of the population is under 6 years of age, with the number being 4,037.The Child sex ratio was 967 girls per 1000 boys.

[OWN RESEARCH:Refer at your own warning]: As a resident of Perungalathur, The literacy rate has grown more than 95%. The population has also near crossed the 50k mark. The area has urbanised a lot since the last census. (As of October 2025)

== Location ==
Perungulathur is located on NH45 highway between Tambaram and Vandalur. Perungulathur and Peerkankaranai are neighbourhoods which share and complement much of their resources and infrastructures alike. It is well connected by rail and road links.

== Transportation ==
The proximity of Tambaram railway junction and Arignar Anna Zoological Park in Vandalur has given Perungalathur good connectivity with places like Chennai, Chengalpattu and Kanchipuram. Industrial estates like Guindy, Maraimalai Nagar, Padappai, Oragadam and Sriperumbudur are easily accessible via road or rail. Residents of adjoining areas like Peerkankaranai, Sadanandhapuram, Old Perungulathur Annai Indra Nagar and RMK Nagar avail transport facilities from Perungulathur. Perungulathur is the hub for most of tourist bus operators and many have offices opposite to first railway gate. All MTC buses towards Vandalur passes through Perungulathur.

Perungulathur railway station is about 30 km from Chennai Central. Southern Railway is currently renovating and expanding the station, including extension of platforms. The two existing platforms were laid during the British era when most trains had nine compartments and are now being extended to accommodate 12-car trains. Currently, over 10,000 commuters use the station daily. All 84 suburban trains halting at the station have 12 compartments. A new rail line exclusively for express trains is also planned.

== Lakes ==
The town has two lakes, one in Peerkankaranai, adjacent to NH-45 and another Perungulathur lake behind the Vedanta Desika Srinivasa Perumal Temple. Much of Peerkankaranai Lake was filled during the widening of NH-45 highway and the remaining area is shrinking due to dumping of solid wastes and encroachments. Perungulathur Lake, spread over an area of 55 acres, gives the name to this town meaning "A Place with Big pond" (Perum – Kulam – Urr).
