= Kovur, Chennai =

Kovur
- Suburb
- Kovur
- Location within Chennai
- Coordinates: 13.010800°N 80.117700°E
- Country: India
- State: Tamil Nadu
- District: Chennai
- Metro: Chennai
- Taluk: Kundrathur
- Elevation: 44 m (144 ft)

Population (2024)
  - Total: 20,501
- Time zone: UTC+05:30 (IST)
- Pincode: 600128
- Vehicle registration: TN 85 (RTO, Kovur)

Kovur is a western suburb of Chennai, India. It is located in the Indian state of Tamil Nadu and is situated at a distance of about 5 kilometers from Porur on the Porur-Kundrathur Road. Kovur is located at an altitude of about 44 m above the mean sea level.

== Demographics ==
According to the 2001 census, Kovur had a population of 5,948 with 3,004 males and 2,944 females. The sex ratio was 948 and the literacy rate, 84.48.
