= Pammal =

Prime Neighbourhood in Chennai

- Suburb of Chennai
- Location in Chennai Metropolitan Area Location in Tamil Nadu Location in India
- Coordinates: 12.974900°N 80.132800°E
- Country: India
- State: Tamil Nadu
- Metro: Chennai Metropolitan Area
- District: Chengalpattu
- City: Tambaram, Chennai

Government
  - MP: T.R. Baalu (DMK)
  - MLA: I. Karunanithi (DMK)
  - Corporation Commissioner: S. Balachander IAS
  - Mayor: K. Vasanthakumari (DMK)
  - Deputy Mayor: G. Kamaraj (DMK)

Area
  - Total: 13 km^{2} (5.0 sq mi)
- Elevation: 47 m (154 ft)

Population (2011)
  - Total: 75,870
  - Density: 5,800/km^{2} (15,000/sq mi)

Languages
  - Official: Tamil
  - Additional official: English
- Time zone: UTC+5:30 (IST)
- PINs: 600075
- Area codes: 2248, 2263
- Vehicle Registration: TN 85
- Law enforcement agency: Tambaram City Police
- Urban planning agency: Chennai Metropolitan Development Authority

Pammal is a southern suburb in Chennai, Tamil Nadu, India.

The neighborhood is around 22 kilometers from Chennai Central Railway Station, in proximity to Pallavaram on the western side of the Grand Southern Trunk Road (GST Road) close to Chennai International Airport. The neighborhood is served by Pallavaram Railway Station of the Chennai Suburban Railway Network. Formerly a Municipality, Pammal was merged to Tambaram City Municipal Corporation in 2021.

Pallavaram–Thuraipakkam 200-feet Radial Road connects Pammal with Thuraipakkam and other areas in OMR (Rajiv Gandhi Salai) and ECR (East Coast Road). The service road along the Chennai Bypass Flyover in Pammal connects many areas with Pammal. The Chennai Outer Ring Road is 5 km from Pammal. Tambaram Railway Station Terminal is 7 kilometers and is a halt for express trains and 12 km from Poonamallee.

Leather and tannery factories are present in and around Pammal, which are labour-intensive and employ many people. Pammal Sambandha Mudaliar, the father of modern Tamil theatre, was born in Pammal.

== Demographics ==
Religious census
Religion	Percent(%)
Hindu	73.16%
Muslim	13.02%
Christian	12.09%
Sikh	0.04%
Buddhist	0.03%
Jain	0.14%
Other	0.77%
No religion	0.01%

According to 2011 Census, Pammal had a population of 75,870, of which 37,971 were men and 37,899 were women. Out of the total population, 73.16% are Hindus, 13.02% are Muslims, 12.09% are Christians, 0.04% are Sikhs, 0.01% are Buddhists, 0.16% are Jains, 0.02% are of other category and 0.80% are not stated.

== History ==
During the late Chola period (9th to 12th century CE) the area belonged to the Churathur Nadu, named after Thiruchuram, the modern Trisulam village near Pallavaram. The Churathur Nadu extended from Tambaram in the south to Adambakkam and Alandur in the north and included Pammal, Pallavaram, and Thiruneermalai.

Inscriptions at Thiruneermalai refer to certain merchants from Pammal, showing that this village near Pallavaram existed even then.

== Neighbourhoods ==
Pammal is made up of many communities and townships:

- Moongil Nagar: Several years back, this area was covered by Moongil Eri (Lake). So, the place got its name. Now, the place changed into a residential colony.
- Muthamizh Nagar is the entrance gateway to Pammal along Pammal Main Road from Pallavaram. The place is familiar with Tannery in the land behind the Nagaiamman Temple. Several major shop are available. Sri Selva Vinayagar Temple is located here.
- Krishna Nagar is located next to Muthamizh Nagar along Pammal Main Road. The Place is famous for Sri Siddhi Vinagar Temple. Tamil Nadu Brahmin Association Pammal Branch Office is located here.
- Aranganathan Nagar is a residential area between Krishna Nagar and Muthamizh Nagar, located on the northern side of Pammal Main Road. It is a developing area with the construction of more new apartments. Pammal Post Office is located near Aranganathan Nagar. Sri Devi Karumaari Amman Temple is located here. The Head Office and Packaging Area for Jinga Dharbar Restaurant, Maduravoyal is located near Aranganathan Nagar.
- Anna Nagar is the entrance to Pammal when plying through Nallathambi Main Road from Abdul Farook Sahib Main Road in Pallavaram. It has several shops along Nallathambi Main Road. Pammal Municipality Community Centre is located here.
- SBI Colony is named after State Bank of India employees residing in these areas. A Children Park is available here. The Signal Office - Mide Marker Station owned by the Airport Authority of India for the arrival of flights is located here.
- Lakshmi Narayana Nagar is the residential area very closer to Chennai Airport Runway. The viewpoint for Airport Runway is available here. It is located near Signal Office.
- Ayyappa Nagar is a residential area on the northern side of Moses Street.
- Ponni Nagar is located on the southern side of Pammal Main Road next to Krishna Nagar.
- Swaminathan Nagar is a residential area near Ayyappa Nagar.
- Thiruvalluvar Nagar is named after Tamil Poet Thiruvalluvar. Nadar Sanga Matriculation Higher Secondary School is located here. A Thiruvalluvar Statue is located in Elumalai Street in Thiruvalluvar Nagar.
- Sambandhanar Nagar is named after Pammal Sambandha Mudaliar. It is located next to Krishna Nagar along Pammal Main Road.
- VOC Nagar is a residential area. It extends from Anna Salai up to Shankar Nagar. It has a famous Shiva Vishnu Temple.
- Easwaran Nagar is located along Moses Street which links with Anna Salai (Pammal Market Road).
- Annai Sathya Nagar (include Vallalar street, Mgr street and Arignar Street) is located along Palaniyappan St between Moses Street which links with Anna Salai (Pammal Market Road).
- Gandhi Nagar is a residential area in Nagalkeni. It is located on the southern side of Moses Street.
- HL Colony is a residential colony located along Nallathambi Road and close to Pozhichalur Main Road. It is named after Hindustan Lever Company, a company producing several cosmetic products and manufacturer of Ponds products. Hindustan Lever had its factory well known as Ponds Company in Pallavaram for manufacturing of Ponds Powder. The Employees in the company had been residing in the Hindustan Lever Colony of Pammal. Now the area is also getting many more developments.
- LIC Colony is a residential area along Thiruneermalai Main Road. It is a way to Service Road along Chennai Bypass Flyover and connects other localities like Thiruneermalai and Thirumudivakkam. It is also a way to Shankar Nagar and Kamarajapuram. Pammal EB Sub Station is located here.
- Shankar Nagar is a major locality and well known for major apartments. It has several temples like Sri Shankara Vinayagar Sundara Anjaneyar Temple, and Pammal Sri DharmaSastha Guruvayurappan Temple. It also has several educational institutions like Meenakshi Krishnan Polytechnic college, VKK Ammani ammal Matriculation School, Sri Sankara Vidyaya Matriculation Higher Secondary School, Sri Sankara Global Academy, and EuroKids International Preschool. Other important landmarks located in this area are Exnora Green Pammal head office, Pammal Bus Terminus, and the S6 Sankar Nagar Police station.
- Pasumpon Nagar is a residential area along Pozhichalur Main Road sharing its border with Pozhichalur village.
- Nagalkeni is where the leather industry once thrived. The Tamil Nadu government school, the oldest Adi-Dravida Higher Secondary School, is located in Nagalkeni. The groundwater was polluted by industry. The area continues to be an industrial center; one noted company is the Tag Corporation, which manufactures heavy electrical equipment. With the construction of a railway overbridge on the Pallavaram-Thoraipakkam radial road, this area will become much more accessible to the IT corridor than East Tambaram and is hence attracting real estate investment. This area has Reliance Market which is a supermarket.
- Arkeeswarar Colony is adjacent to Nagelkeni. This colony is the property of Arkeeswarar Kovil and has 7 streets in it.
- Kalyanipuram is located near Nagalkeni. This area is famous for Pazhaya Periya Palayathamman Temple and Prasanna Venkatesa Perumal temple.

== Transportation ==
The Chennai International Airport is 2 km from Pammal, and Pammal bus stand is located between Pallavaram and Kundrathur, linking Pallavaram and Poonamallee. Pammal is served by Pallavaram Railway Station on the Chennai Beach - Chengalpattu section of Chennai Suburban Railway Network.

State Highway 113A (SH-113A) Pallavaram - Kundrathur - Poonamallee Road runs through Pammal, it is popularly known as Pammal Main Road.

Currently, the neighborhoods of Pammal and Pallavaram are served by the Chennai Airport Metro Station of the Chennai Metro Rail Limited(CMRL) network.

CMRL feeder services are also available from Chennai Airport Metro Station to Pammal Bus Stop.

The proposed Airport - Kilambakkam metro extension of Blue Line will introduce Pallavaram Metro Station to serve Pallavaram and Pammal.

The Airport - Kilambakkam Metro Line was originally planned with a route via Pallavaram, Pammal, Thiruneermalai Service Road, and then Tambaram and straight along the GST road up to Vandalur Kilambakkam. Later CMRL decided to follow the route through the GST Road from Airport to Kilambakkam via Pallavaram, Tambaram and Vandalur which involved less land acquisition, was easier to construct and was expected to have more patronage.

As part of the plan for the Chennai Mono Rail, there was a plan for a route between Vandalur and Puzhal via Pallavaram, Pammal, Kundrathur, Mangadu, Kumanan Chavadi, and Poonamallee High Road to reach Puzhal. Recently, CMRL announced feasibility for a Chennai Light Rail project between Tambaram and Velachery. After completion of the CMRL Phase I Extension from Airport to Kilambakkam and CMRL Phase II extension from Light House to Poonamallee, there will be a Chennai Light Rail connection between Pallavaram and Poonamallee via Pammal, Anakaputhur, and Kundrathur.
