= Tirusoolanathar Temple =

Tirusoolanathar Tripurasundari temple
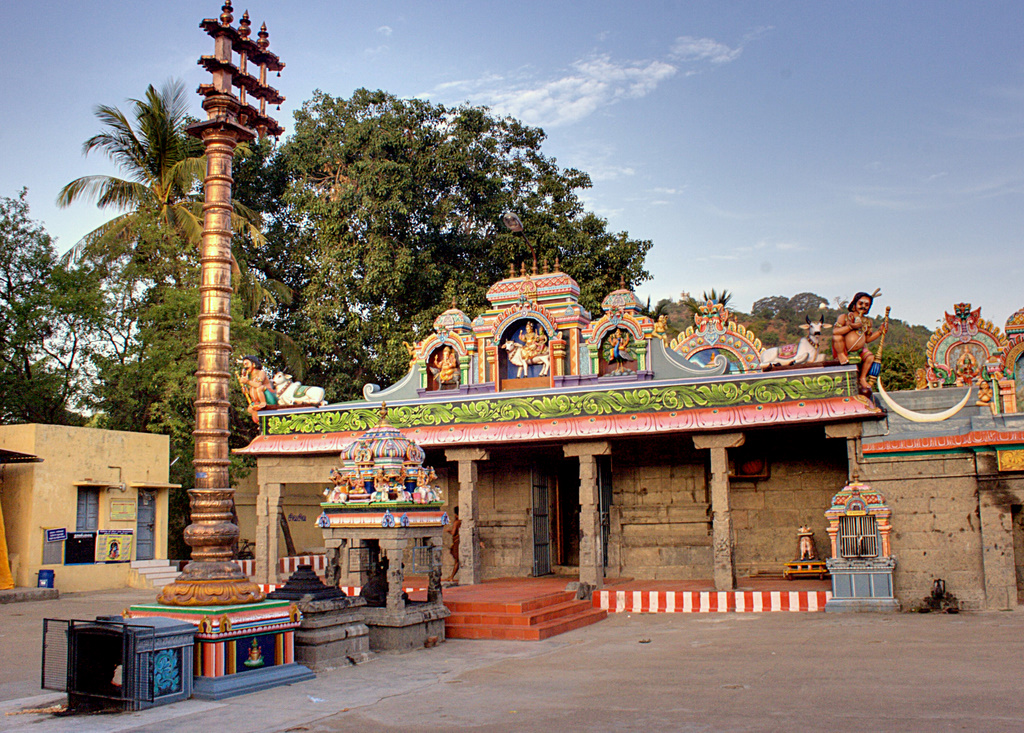
- Tirusoolanathar Tripurasundari temple at Tirusulam

- Tirusulanathar Temple, Chengalpattu, Tamil Nadu

Religion
- Affiliation: Hinduism
- District: Chengalpattu
- Deity: Lord Tirusulanathar

Location
- Location: Tirusulam
- State: Tamil Nadu
- Country: India
- Interactive map of Tirusoolanathar Tripurasundari temple
- Coordinates: 12.9735°N 80.1661°E

Architecture
- Completed: 11th century CE
- Elevation: 45.86 m (150 ft)

Tirusoolanathar Tripurasundari Temple, also known as the Tirusoolanathar Temple, is a Hindu temple located in Tirusulam, a suburb of Chennai, India. The presiding deity is Shiva. The goddess is Tirupurasundari. The temple has inscriptions dating from the Pallava period.

== Etymology ==
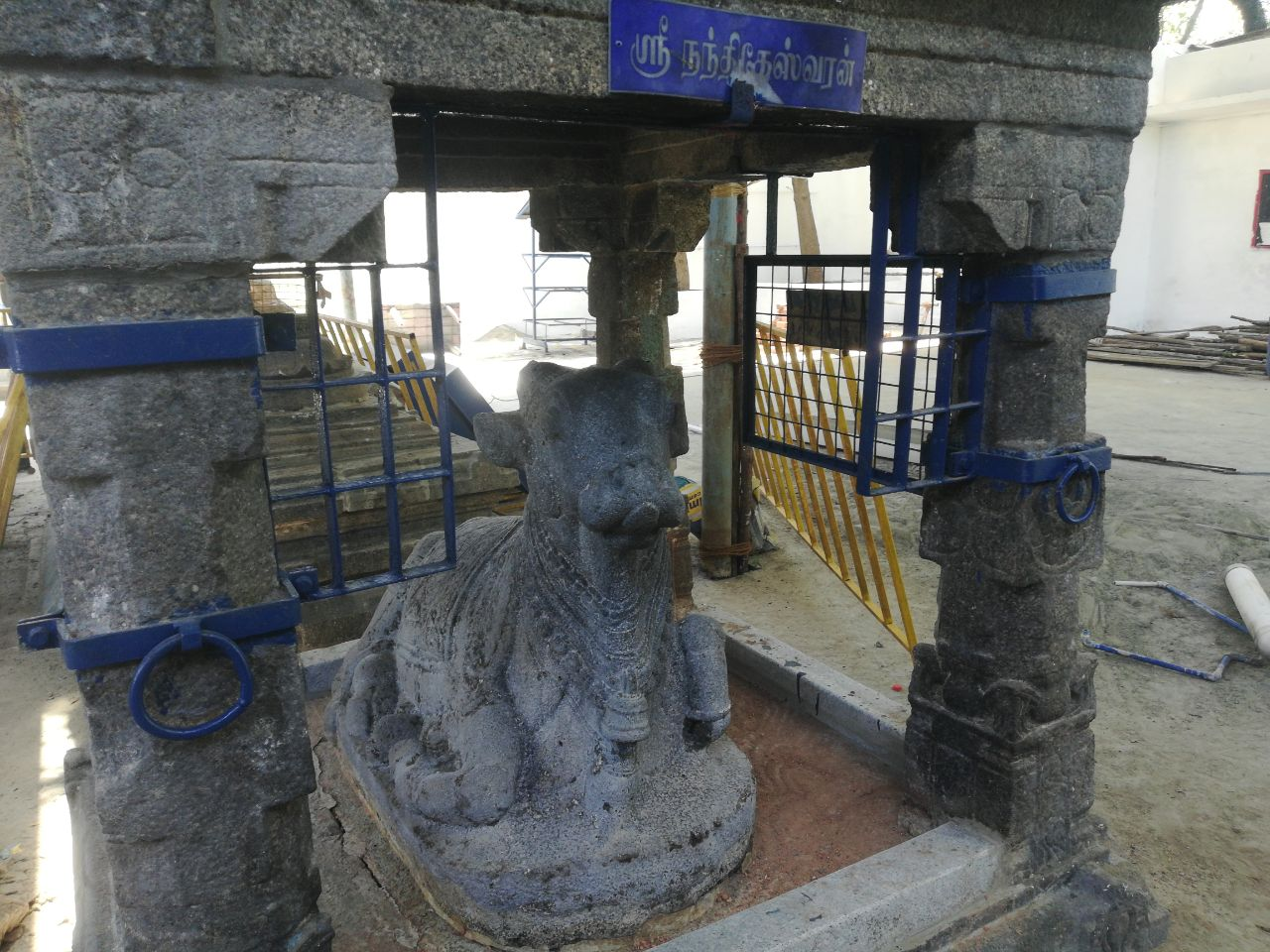
Nandhi statue at the temple

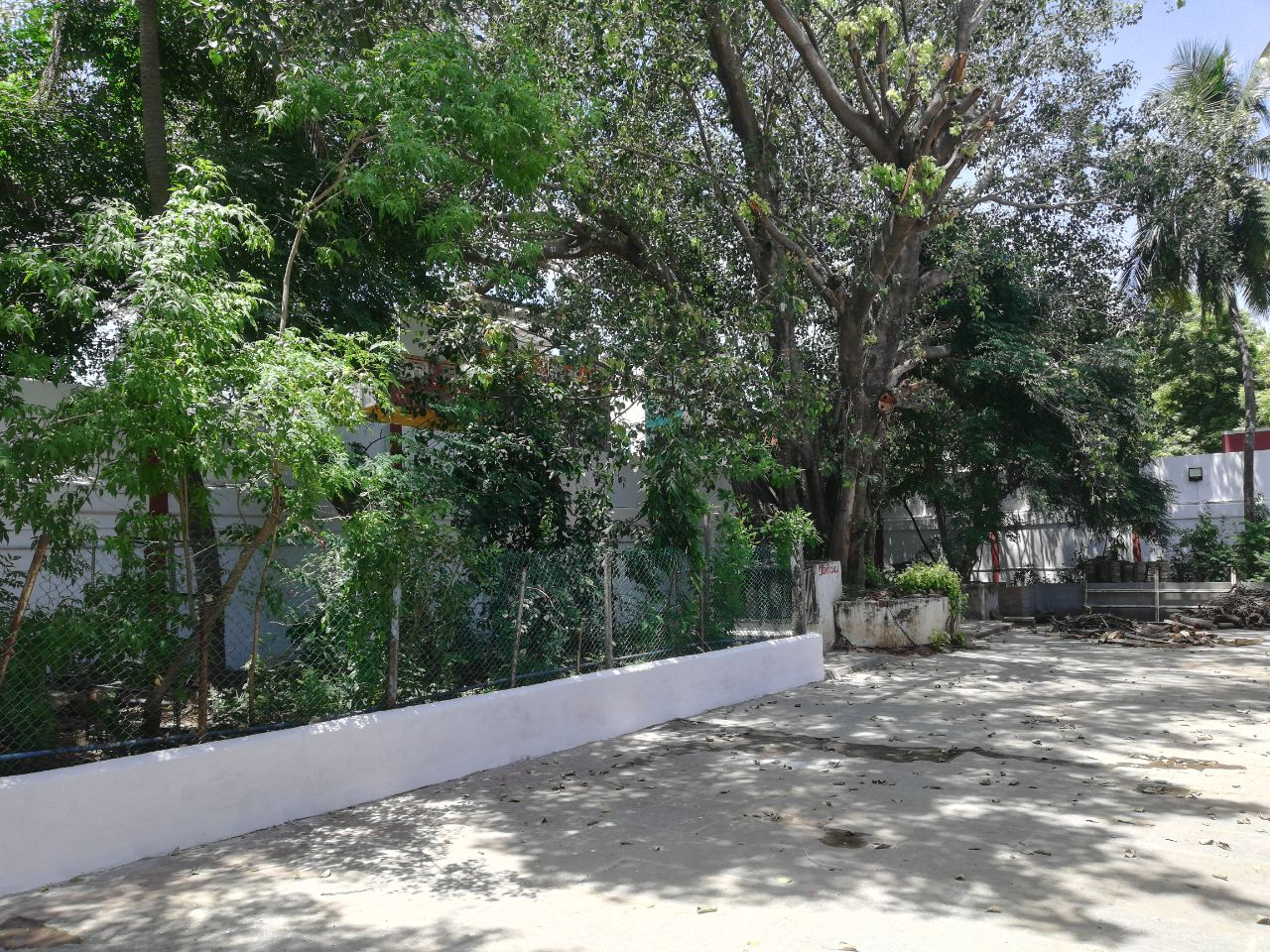
Nandavanam (garden) at the temple

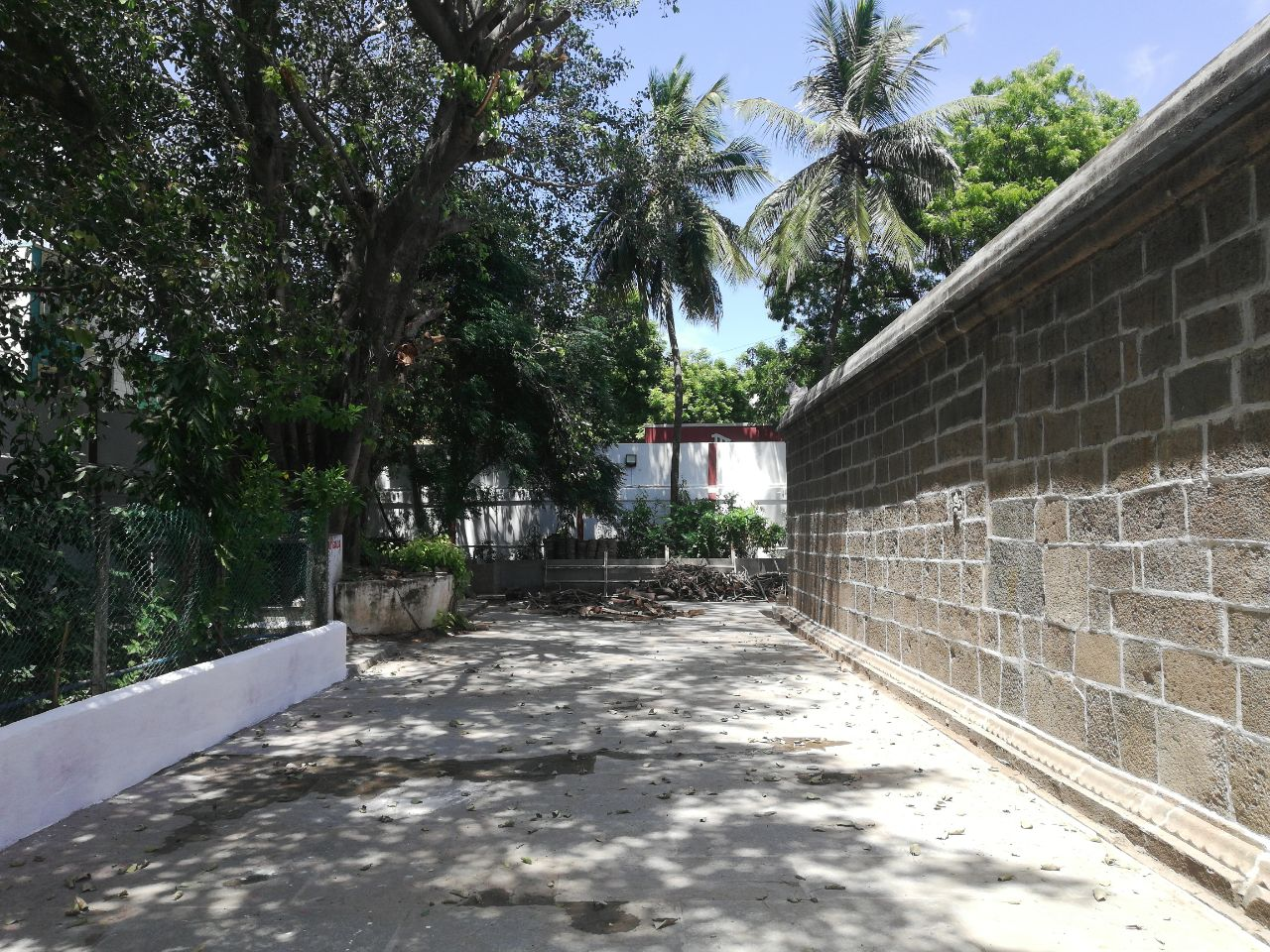
Outer prakaram (corridor) at the temple

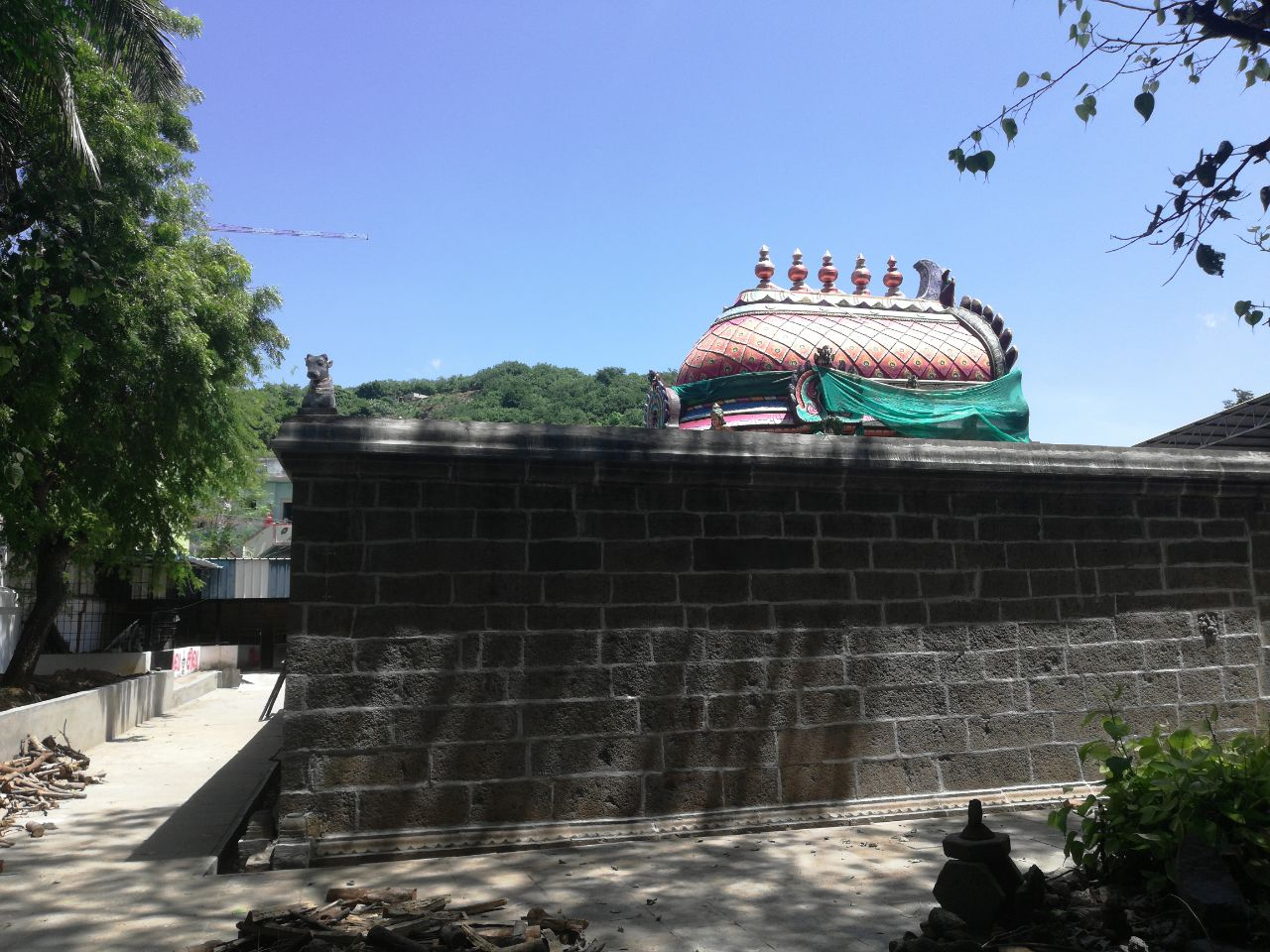
The temple's vimanam (innermost gopuram)

The temple gets its name from Trichuram family which ruled over the region.

== History ==
Sri Thirusoolanathar, Thiruchuram was constructed by the Medieval Chola king Kulothunga Chola I and later renovated by Sundara Cholar. The temple has inscriptions dating from the 11th century CE. The Moolavar is facing east and his consort Thirupurasundari is facing south. Inside the main sanctum is another deity of Thirupurasundari, which was damaged by intruders during Muslim invasion kept next to Thirusoolanathar.

The walls of the temple have inscriptions from the Chola period, and Pandiya kingdom, which denotes by the temple inscription The temple has big historical mysteries behind the walls. There is a story of a hiding place for precious metals and jewelry beneath the earth, where a secret path is said to exist. Kulothunga I is said to have hidden treasures somewhere here, instead of inside the temple. There exists a subway under the temple that connects the temple to the nearby hills known as "Panchapandava's Hills", where the king had his palace.

== See also ==
- Religion in Chennai
- Heritage structures in Chennai
