= Tirusulam =

Census Town in Chengalpattu district

Tirusulam, Chennai திரிசூலம் Sathurvethimangalam
- suburb of Chennai
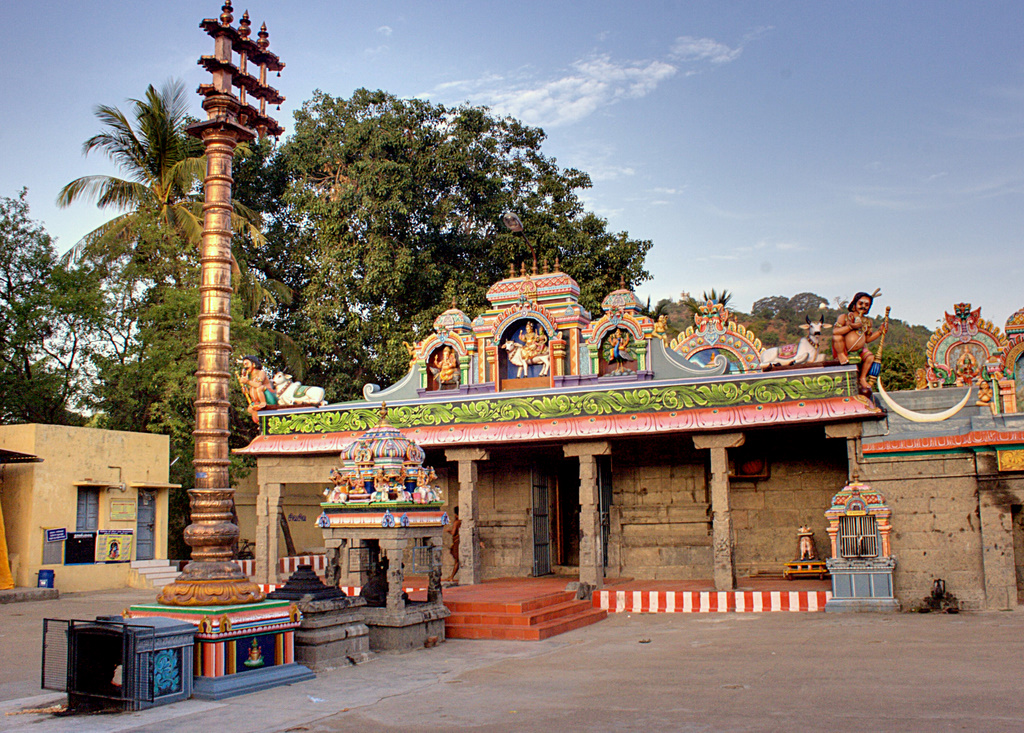
- Tirusoolanathar temple at Tirusulam

- Location within Chennai
- Coordinates: 12.98015°N 80.16566°E
- Country: India
- State: Tamil Nadu
- District: Chengalpattu
- Taluk: Pallavaram
- Metro: Chennai
- City: Tambaram

Population (2018)
  - Total: 36,580

Languages
  - Official: Tamil
- Time zone: UTC+5:30 (IST)
- Pincode(s): 600 043
- Area code: 2264
- Vehicle registration: TN-22

Tirusulam is a southern suburb of Chennai and a census town in Chengalpattu district falling within the Chennai metropolitan area, adjoining the Chennai International Airport, with the cargo terminal located at the adjacent Meenambakkam. The locality is served by Tirusulam railway station and Pallavaram Railway Station. Connectivity to Chennai Central Railway Station is provided by the Chennai Airport metro station of the Chennai Metro. Also there is a tower testing station here. Tirusulam will be part of Tambaram City Municipal Corporation.

== History ==
Tirusulam was known as "Tirusuram" and also known as "Sathurvethimangalam" it has its origin in the Tiruppurasundari Tirusoolanathar temple which is believed to have been constructed in the 11th century CE by Kulothunga I. The walls of the temple have inscriptions from the Chola period, and Pandiya kingdom, which denotes by the temple inscription The temple has big historical mysteries behind the walls. There is a story of a hiding place for precious metals and jewelry beneath the earth, where a secret path is said to exist. Kulothunga I is said to have hidden treasures somewhere here, instead of inside the temple. There exists a subway under the temple that connects the temple to the nearby hills known as "Panchapandava's Hills", where the king had his palace.

Tirusulam is in Chengalpattu district. Census figures from 2018 indicate a population of 36,580 (approximately).

The Tirusulam Hills have been witness to the shooting of many Tamil movies and TV soap operas. Some of the movies that have been filmed here are Bhairavi, Oorkavalan, Indru Poi Naalai Vaa, Shree, Gentleman, Theeradha Vilayattu Pillai and Sethu. Also a central governments tower testing centre on the hill.

== Geography ==
=== Thirisulam hill ===
Thirisulam hill is the tallest hill in the city and has many places of worship. There is a mosque on top of the hill. On one side of the hill, there is a temple dedicated to the Hindu god Murugan.

=== Religion ===
Tirusoolanathar Temple is the most famous temple in the locality, located amidst of 4 hills denoting 4 Vedas. It was re-built recently and Maha-Kumbabhisegam conducted successfully. Tirusulam has 9 temples on its 4 sides, known as Santhiyamman Kovil (Located in the Airport), Periya palayathu Amman Kovil, Thirusulanayagi Kovil (Samy Nagar), Sri Devi Puthru Nagathamman kovil(Kennady Valley), Mukkaniyamman Kovil, Pachaiyamman Kovil, Karumariamman Kovil (Siva Sakthi Nagar), Good Friend Church (Ganapathy Avenue), CSI Jeba Aalayam (Indira Nagar), Vempuliyamman Kovil (Yadaval Street), Tirusulam Thandumari Amman Temple, Thulkathamman Kovil, Sri Vishwarupa Vekkaliamman Temple - which is very special here 62 feet statue is located and surrounded by nature and best religious spot in thirusulam. St. Antony's Church is the biggest church in the locality.

=== Thirisulam market ===
Tirusulam is closer to a very big market Pallavaram Sandhai. It has hundreds of shops and roadside vendors, that have been in operation for more than 218 years. It opens only on Friday, and is commonly known as "Friday Sandhai". As it is near the Chennai International Airport, it is possible to find almost anything in the market, from vegetables to house hold articles, electrical and electronic gadgets, books, dresses, potted plants, flowers, tools, knives, etc.

=== Thirisulam Lakes ===
There are many small lakes with large amounts of water. Because of these lakes, Tirusulam town has never experienced scarcity of water. Due to the presence of the lakes and mountains, life is healthy and natural.

== Transport ==
Tirusulam, besides having Chennai's only airport, is well connected to the city of Chennai by public surface transport comprising the electric train service that was built during British rule. Tirusulam is located in the Beach-Tambaram-Chengalpattu suburban railway line. The Grand Southern Trunk Road (GST) that connects various south Indian cities to Chennai passes through this town. Buses to Tambaram, Beach, T Nagar, High Court, Avadi and some other important landmarks in Chennai city are available at regular intervals from Tirusulam.

Since Chennai International Airport is located here in Tirusulam, the electric train service and the metropolitan bus service help to connect all parts of the city to the airport. The metro line and the Railway Minister's announcement of the possibility of a railway junction in 5 years (like Egmore and Tambaram), all are set to make this town the biggest transportation hub in Chennai.

== Demographics ==
Tirusulam has a population of 36,580 approximately as of 2018.

Tirusulam has an average literacy rate of 70%, higher than the national average of 67.5%: male literacy is 65%, and female literacy is 70%.

== See also ==
- List of railway stations in India
