= Kundrathur Murugan Temple =

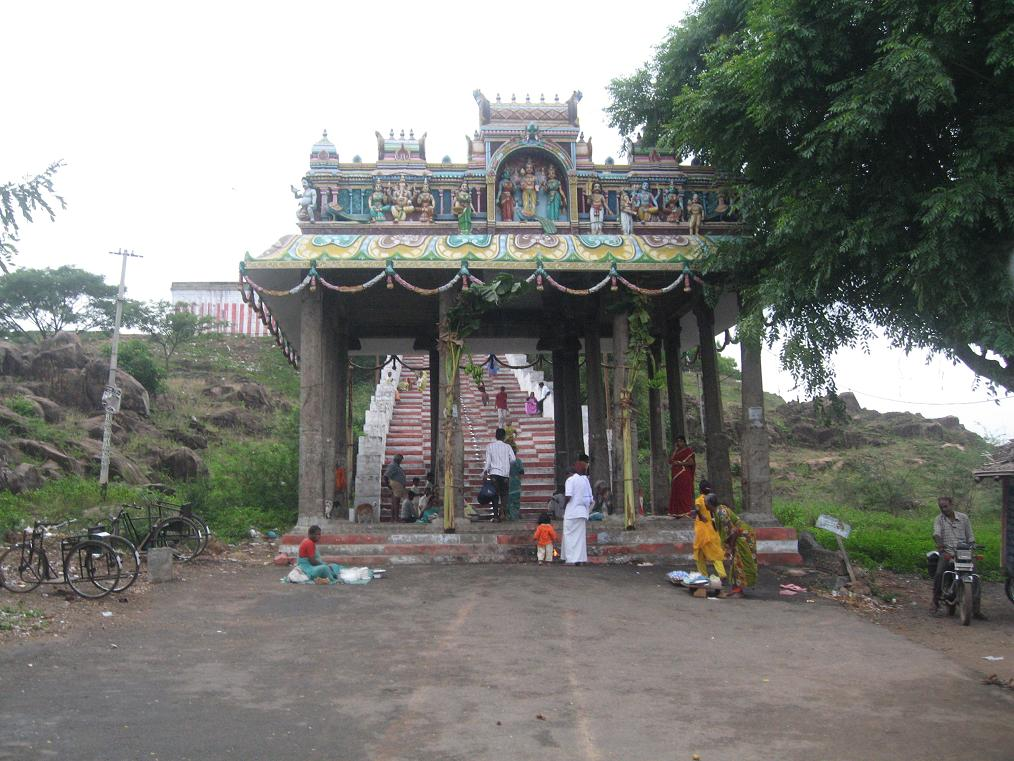
- A view of the temple entrance

- Location of temple in Chennai

Religion
- Affiliation: Hinduism
- District: Kanchipuram
- Deity: Murugan
- Governing body: Hindu Religious and Charitable Endowments Department

Location
- Location: Kundrathur
- State: Tamil Nadu
- Country: India
- Interactive map of Kundrathur Murugan Temple
- Coordinates: 12.9974°N 80.0966°E

Kundrathur Murugan Temple is a Hindu temple located in Kundrathur, a suburb of Chennai in the Kancheepuram district of Tamil Nadu.

According to Hindu mythology, Lord Subramaniar (Murugan) stayed on the hill during his travels from Tiruporur to Tiruttanigai. This place is also known as South Thanigai, as Lord Subramaniar is depicted facing the north, towards Thanigai.

== Architecture ==
This is the only Murugan temple in Tamil Nadu where the God is standing in a north facing direction. This temple was constructed by King Kulothunga Chola II. The speciality of this temple is that Lord Subramaniar can be seen only with one Goddess at a time even though he is there along with both the Goddesses. If the God is viewed from one side he can be seen along with Goddess Valli and viewed from the other side, he can be seen along with Goddess Deivayanai.

== History ==
Once winning the demons in Thiruporur, Lord Muruga went to Thirutani in a joyous spirit. He placed a Siva Linga, performed pooja and meditated deep. The temple was subsequently constructed by the great Chola King Kulothunga Chola. Lord Siva, worshiped by Lord Muruga graces the worshipers in the name of Kandaleeswarar in a separate shrine.

== See also ==
- Religion in Chennai
- Heritage structures in Chennai

== Photogallery ==
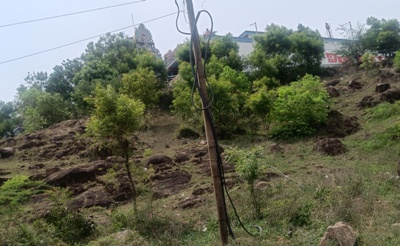
Temple on the hill

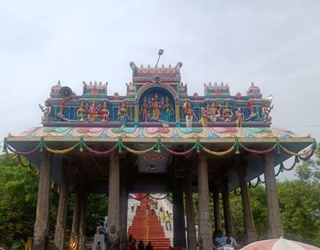
Main entrance

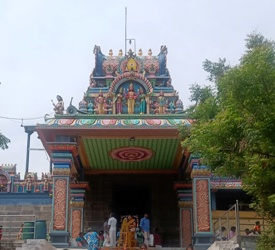
Front mandapa

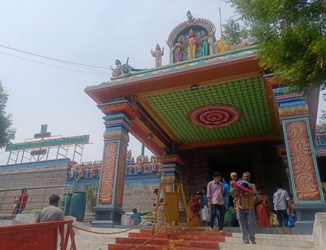
Front mandapa with prakara

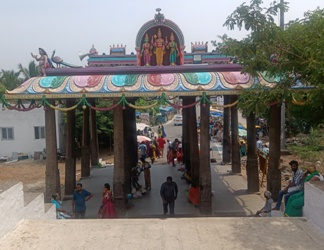
Another view of the entrance
