= Tambaram division =

Revenue division located South of Chennai, Tamil Nadu, India

Tambaram revenue division is a revenue division in the Chengalpattu district of Tamil Nadu, India. It comprises taluks of Pallavaram, Tambaram and Vandalur.

The sub post office at Perumbakkam opened on 1 March 2021 is the 100th post office in Tambaram division. Tambaram postal division also recorded the highest collection of Rs.142.9 crore and received an award in 2022.

In November 2017, many unauthorised structures were removed in Tambaram division.
