= Pallavaram Friday Market =

Market in Chennai, Tamil Nadu, India

Pallavaram Friday Market Pallavaram Sandhai
- Pallavaram Friday Bazaar
- Location: Old Trunk Road, Officers Lane, Cantonment Pallavaram, Chennai - 600043; Landmark: Pallavaram Railway Station and Chennai International Airport

Pallavaram Friday Market (popularly known as Pallavaram Sandhai) is a market in Zamin Pallavaram, Chennai, Tamil Nadu. It is a marketplace for vendors where food items, plant saplings, animals and electronic goods are available.

The market had its origin in the 1800s. The market is open only on Fridays, and is known locally as the Friday Market.

The Friday market is located closer to Tirusulam Railway Station, Tirusulam Bus Stand and Chennai International Airport to its northern end, and Pallavaram Railway Station and Pallavaram Bus Stand to its southern end.

On the other side of the GST Road in Cantonment Pallavaram, the Bazaar Road serves as an everyday alternate to the Friday market.

== History ==
Pallavaram Sandhai was originally existed in Cattle Shandy Road (or) Maattu Sandhai Road (Currently Known as Acharya Tulsi Road) in Cantonment Pallavaram. Later the market was moved to Old Trunk Road near Pallavaram Railway Station Flyover.
