= Polichalur =

Pozhichalur
- neighbourhood
- Location within Chennai
- Coordinates: 12.985359°N 80.139835°E
- Country: India
- State: Tamil Nadu
- District: Chengalpattu
- Metro: Chennai
- City: Tambaram

Population (2011)
  - Total: 21,906

Languages
  - Official: Tamil
- Time zone: UTC+5:30 (IST)
- PIN: 600074
- Telephone code: 91-44-2263-XXXX
- Vehicle registration: TN-85
- Website: municipality.tn.gov.in/Pozhichalur

Pozhichalur (also commonly spelled as Polichalur) is a census town in the Indian state of Tamil Nadu. It is a suburb of Chennai on the south bank of the Adyar River near the Chennai Airport and is served by Pallavaram Railway Station.

== Demographics ==
As of 2011 India census, Pozhichalur had a population of 21,906. Males constitute 50.4% of the population and females 49.5%. Pozhichalur has an average literacy rate of 80.4%, higher than the national average of 59.5%: male literacy is 84%, and female literacy is 73%. In Pozhichalur, 11% of the population is under 6 years of age.

== Airport expansion ==
The previous AIADMK regime (2001–06) government had allotted 2,000 acres of land free for the AAI to carry out the expansion by taking lands from residents of Pozhichalur, Pammal and Anakaputhur. Under pressure from the opposition parties such as CPM, DMK, [DMDK], PMK, and MDMK, the government later decided to drop land acquisition in the said areas and identified alternative land at Manapakkam, Tharapakkam, Kolapakkam and Gerugambakkam.
