= Peerkankaranai =

Neighborhood of Tambaram, India

- Neighbourhood
- Location in Chennai Metropolitan Area Location in Tamil Nadu Location in India
- Coordinates: 12.911126°N 80.103636°E
- Country: India
- State: Tamil Nadu
- Metro: Chennai Metropolitan Area
- District: Chengalpattu
- City: Tambaram

Government
  - MP: T.R. Baalu (DMK)
  - MLA: S.R. Raja (DMK)
  - Corporation Commissioner: R. Alagumeena IAS
  - Mayor: K. Vasanthakumari (DMK)
  - Deputy Mayor: G. Kamaraj (DMK)

Languages
  - Official: Tamil
  - Additional official: English
- Time zone: UTC+5:30 (IST)
- PINs: 600063
- Area code: +91-044-2274
- Vehicle Registration: TN 11
- Law enforcement agency: Tambaram City Police
- Urban planning agency: Chennai Metropolitan Development Authority

Peerkankaranai is a neighborhood in the city of Tambaram, situated within the Chennai Metropolitan Area, Tamil Nadu, India.

Originally a town panchayat, it was merged with the Tambaram Municipal Corporation in 2021.

== Demographics ==
As of 2001 India census, Peerkankaranai had a population of 17,521. Males constitute 50% of the population and females 50%. Peerkankaranai has an average literacy rate of 82%, higher than the national average of 59.5%: male literacy is 86%, and female literacy is 79%. In Peerkankaranai, 10% of the population is under 6 years of age.
