= Tirusulam railway station =

Railway station in Chennai, India

Tirusulam
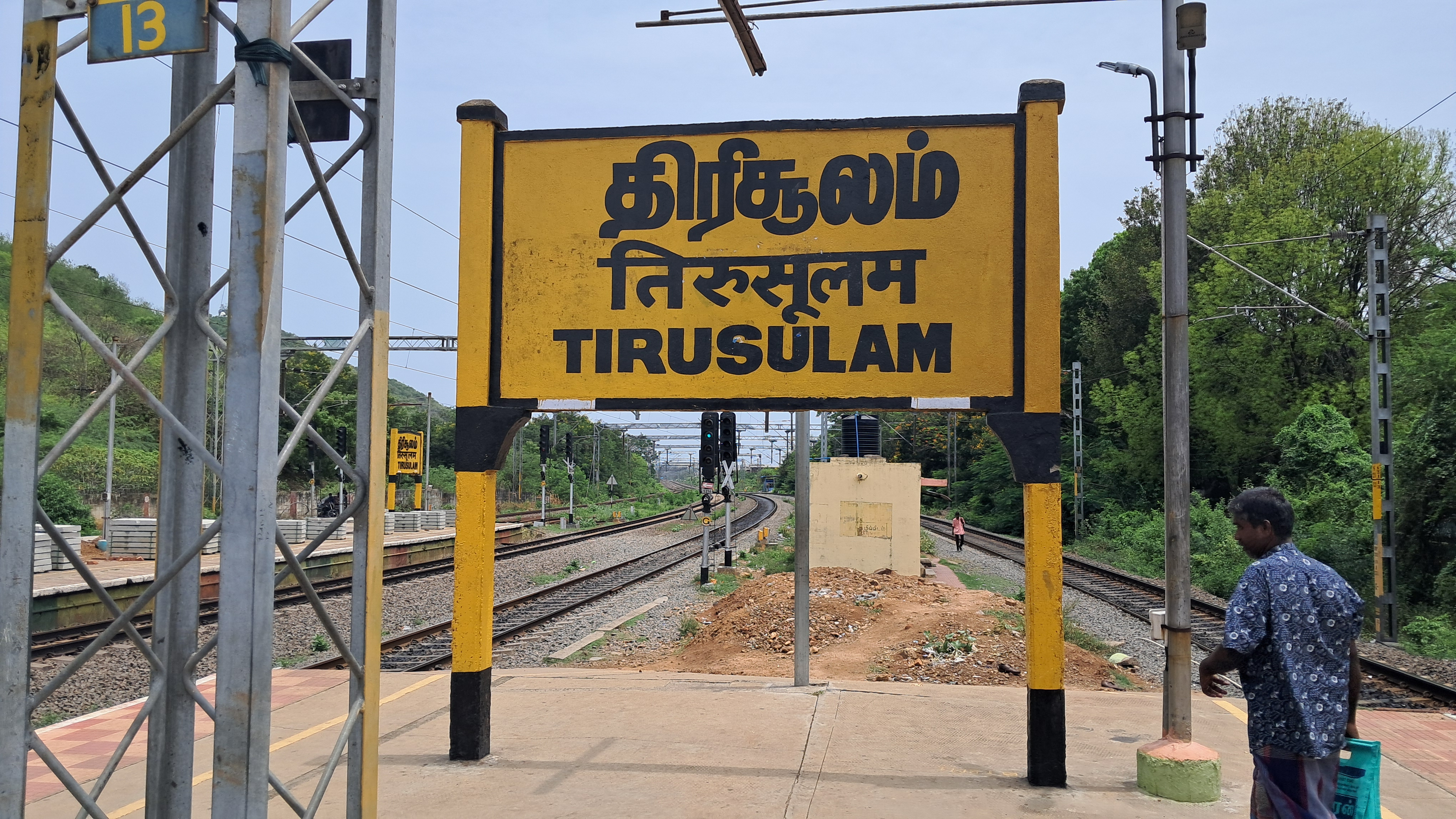
- Tirusulam railway station as of June 2025

General information
- Location: Grand Southern Trunk Road, Tirusulam, Chennai, Tamil Nadu, India
- Coordinates: 12°58′23″N 80°10′12″E
- System: Indian Railways and Chennai Suburban Railway station
- Owner: Ministry of Railways, Indian Railways
- Lines: South and South West lines of Chennai Suburban Railway
- Platforms: 4 (280 m (920 ft))
- Tracks: 4

Construction
- Structure type: Standard on-ground station
- Parking: Available

Other information
- Station code: TLM
- Fare zone: Southern Railways

History
- Former names: South Indian Railway

Services
Preceding station	Chennai Suburban	Following station
Meenambakkam towards Chennai Beach	South Line	Pallavaram towards Tambaram, Chengalpattu Junction or Villupuram Junction
Route map
Chennai Beach — Villupuram
Location

The Tirusulam Railway Station also known as Chennai International Airport Station is one of the railway stations of the Chennai Beach–Chengalpattu section of the Chennai Suburban Railway Network. It serves the neighbourhood of Tirusulam, a suburb of Chennai where the city's airport is located. It is located at a distance of 21 km (13 mi) from Chennai Beach terminus and is situated on the GST Road across the airport, with an elevation of 20 m (66 ft) above sea level.

== History ==
The station was opened in the year 1985. The station lies in the Chennai Beach–Tambaram section of the Chennai Suburban Railway Network, the first suburban section of the city. With the completion of track-lying work in March 1931, which began in 1928, the suburban services were started on 11 May 1931 between Beach and Tambaram, and was electrified on 15 November 1931, with the first MG EMU services running on 1.5 kV DC. The section was converted to 25 kV AC traction on 15 January 1967.

== Layout ==
The station has two suburban platforms and another island platform for long-distance mainline trains. Since mainline trains do not halt at the station, the island platform remains unused. The platform is 280 m long and has been considered to be extended to 575 m as there are plans to halt long-distance trains at the station.

The platforms are connected by subways. These platforms are built to accumulate 24 coaches express train. The platforms are equipped with modern facility like display board of arrival and departure of trains. This is the first station and only till date that has subways to enter and exit the station. All other stations in Chennai have only foot overbridge. Initially, the subways were only up to G.S.T. road (station side). In 2006, the subway was extended inside the Thirusoolam airport complex.

=== Station layout ===
G	Street level	Exit/Entrance & ticket counter
P1	FOB, Side platform | Doors will open on the left
P1	Platform 1	Towards → Chennai Beach; Next Station: Meenambakkam
P1	FOB, Island platform | P1 Doors will open on the left/right | P2 Doors will open on the right
P1	Platform 2	Towards ← Tambaram / Chengalpattu Jn / Villuppuram Jn; Next Station: Pallavaram
P1	Platform 3	Towards → Chennai Egmore
P1	FOB, Island platform | P3 and P4 | (Express Lines)
P1	Platform 4	Towards ← Chengalpattu Junction
P1

== Developments ==
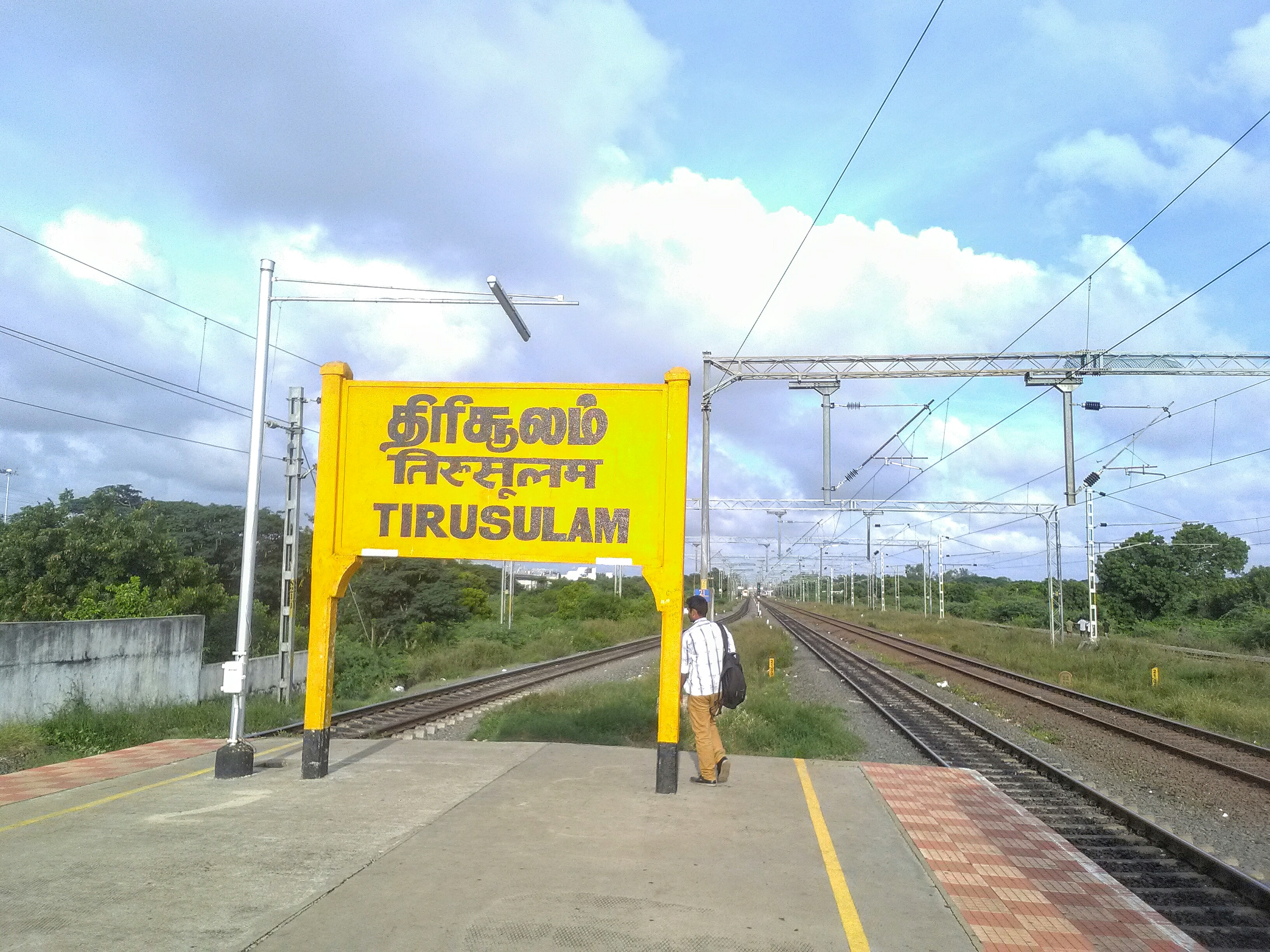

The station is connected to the Chennai airport by means of a subway. Despite being situated at the entrance of the airport, the station does not cater to the needs of the air travellers due to the lack of proper approach corridors and other facilities. With the modernisation of Chennai Airport in 2012, several renovation processes are underway in the station. There are also plans to connect the station with the Metro Rail Station at the airport.

== See also ==
- Chennai Suburban Railway
- Railway stations in Chennai
