= Thirumudivakkam =

Neighborhood of Chennai, India

- Village
- Location in Tamil Nadu, India
- Coordinates: 12.98°N 80.09°E
- Country: India
- State: Tamil Nadu
- District: Kanchipuram
- Metro: Chennai

Government
  - Type: Sarpanch

Population (2011)
  - Total: 4,083

Languages
  - Official: Tamil
- Time zone: UTC+5:30 (IST)
- PIN: 600132

Thirumudivakkam is a south-western suburb of Chennai metropolitan city, Tamil Nadu. This area belongs to Sriperumbudur taluk, Kanchipuram district.

It holds an industrial estate with around 350 MSME companies with varied production units supporting automobile companies and many others at Sriperumbudur, and the Oragadam Industrial corridor.

Tamil Nadu Government State Esi dispensary was established on 2 July 2019 for the well-being of the employees and their families.

Thiruneermalai Perumal temple (one among the 108 Dhivyasthalam) is situated 6 km from this place. Kundrathur is located around 3 km away from Thirumudivakkam.

== Demographics ==
According to 2011 Census of India, the total population of this village is 4083. The literacy rate of this village is 78.21%.
