= Kundrathur taluk =

Kundrathur
- Taluk
- Kundrathur

Area
  - Total: 353.45 km^{2} (136.47 sq mi)

Population (2011)
  - Total: 232,347
  - Density: 657.37/km^{2} (1,702.6/sq mi)

Kundrathur taluk is a taluk of Kanchipuram district of the Indian state of Tamil Nadu. The headquarters of the taluk is the town of Kundrathur. It is formed by bifurcating Pallavaram taluk in erstwhile Kanchipuram district.
