= Keelkattalai =

Suburb of Chennai, India

Keezhkattalai
- Suburb of Chennai
- Location within Chennai Location within Tamil Nadu Location within India
- Coordinates: 12.96487°N 80.19611°E
- Country: India
- State: Tamil Nadu
- District: Chengalpattu
- Metro: Chennai

Government
  - Body: Tambaram Corporation

Languages
  - Official: Tamil, English
- Time zone: UTC+5:30 (IST)
- PIN: 600117
- Planning agency: CMDA
- Distance from Chennai International Airport: 6 kilometres (3.7 mi)
- Distance from Pallavaram railway station: 4 kilometres (2.5 mi)

Keelkattalai (also written as Kilkattalai or Keezhkattalai or "Keellhkattalai") is a suburb of Chennai, India and is part of the Chennai metropolitan area. Formerly a part of Pallavaram Municipality, it was merged into Tambaram City Municipal Corporation in 2021.

== Statistics ==
As of 2011 Census of India, Keelkattalai had a population of 27,981.

Census Data
Year	Population	Male	Female
2001	17,440	9,243	8,197
2011	27,981	14,027	13,954

== History ==
The name Keelkattalai is derived from the word கீழ் from கிழக்கு (east) and கட்டளை (village) and translates to "The village to the east", with respect to Pallavaram, a Pallava era settlement. Initially, Keelkattalai was incorporated as a village panchayat and on 17 January 1970, it was merged with the Zamin Pallavaram Town Panchayat, Issa Pallavaram Town Panchayat, Hasthinapuram Town Panchayat and Nemilichery Panchayat to form the Pallavaram municipality

== Connectivity ==
Keelkattalai enjoys a well connected road network to major hubs in the city through two arterial roads connecting namely the Medavakkam Main Road and Pallavaram-Thoraipakkam Radial Road (SH 109). The area is served well by buses serviced by the Metropolitan Transport Corporation (Chennai) to major locations inside the city. Despite having no railway connectivity, Keelkattalai is easily accessible from Pallavaram (Chennai Suburban Railway), St Thomas Mount (Chennai Suburban Railway) and Velachery (MRTS, Chennai Mass Rapid Transit System)

=== Bus Routes ===
This list includes buses originating from Keelkattalai and the ones passing through Keelkattalai bus terminus.

Route	From	To
M14	NGO Colony	Medavakkam Jn (Koot Rd) (via Keelkattalai)
M18C	Keelkattalai	T.Nagar (via Nanganallur)
M1	Keelkattalai	Thiruvanmiyur (via Velachery)
M45E	Keelkattalai	Anna Square (via Velachery)
18D	Keelkattalai	Broadway (via Adambakkam)
76	Medavakkam Jn (Koot Rd)	CMBT (via Keelkattalai)
S12	Keelkattalai	Velachery
S74	Keelkattalai	Pallavaram Railway Station

== Recreation ==
=== Attractions ===
Keelkattalai Lake is the main attraction.

== Social Infrastructure ==
=== Schools ===
- Apple Kids International Pre-School
- Holy Family Convent Matriculation Higher Secondary School
- Sri Sankara Vidyalaya Matriculation School
- Kiddies Choice Montessori & Kindergarten School
- Vael's vidyashram Global School
- Vel's Higher Secondary School
- Velankanni Matriculation Higher Secondary School
- Baalyaa Senior Secondary School
- Pallavaram Municipality Middle School
- Sai Matriculation higher secondary school

=== Hospitals ===
- Grace Multispeciality Hospital
- Vijayam Hospital
- Divya Hospital

== Government ==
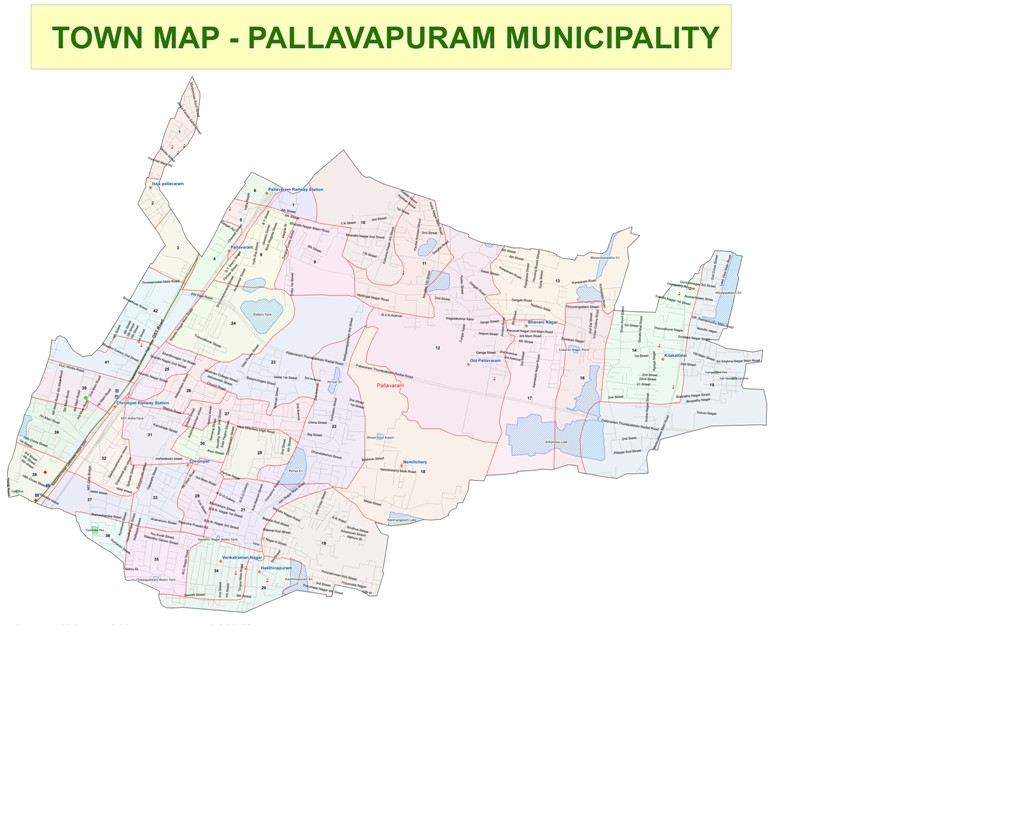
Pallavaram ward map showing Keelkattalai (Eastern end in green)

=== Lok Sabha Representative ===
Keelkattalai is part of Chengalpattu constituency from 2019 Loksabha general election.(Lok Sabha constituency)

=== Pallavaram State Assembly Representative ===
Pallavaram (State Assembly Constituency)

=== Pallavaram Municipality Counsilors ===
Term	Ward 14	Ward 15
2011 -2016	K.Viswanathan	M Gnanasekaran

== Upcoming/Proposed infrastructure work ==
- Three lane, Unidirectional flyover at the Medavakkam Main Road and Radial road intersection
- Chennai Metro Rail station at Keelkattalai (Phase 2)
- Water supply improvement scheme in Pallavaram municipality
- Underground sewerage network in the municipal limits
- Widening of the Medavakkam main road.

== Location in context ==
Source:
