= St. Thomas Mount-cum-Pallavaram =

- city
- Location in Tamil Nadu, India
- Coordinates: 12°59′47″N 80°12′11″E
- Country: India
- State: Tamil Nadu
- Metro: Chennai

Population (2001)
  - Total: 42,459

Languages
  - Official: Tamil
- Time zone: UTC+5:30 (IST)

St. Thomas Mount-cum-Pallavaram is a cantonment located in the Chennai Metropolitan Area in the Indian state of Tamil Nadu. Located partly in Chennai district and partly in Chengalpattu district, it includes some prominent places like the St. Thomas Mount itself, which is a sacred place of Christians where St. Thomas was believed to be martyred, the Anna International Airport and the Officers Training Academy and part of Pallavaram which includes Army Camp, Cantonment Park and some other localities. It lies in Pallavaram Taluk of Chengalpattu District.

== Demographics ==
As of 2001 India census, St. Thomas Mount-cum-Pallavaram had a population of 42,459. Males constitute 51% of the population and females 49%. St. Thomas Mount-cum-Pallavaram has an average literacy rate of 79%, higher than the national average of 59.5%: male literacy is 83%, and female literacy is 75%. In St. Thomas Mount-cum-Pallavaram, 11% of the population is under 6 years of age.

== Enclaves of Cantonment Board ==
1. St. Thomas Mount Cantonment Board Enclave
2. Meenambakkam Cantonment Board Enclave (Chennai International Airport)
3. Pallavaram Cantonment Board Enclave
