= Tambaram City Municipal Corporation =

Local Government of Tambaram City

Tambaram City Municipal Corporation Tāmbaram Mānakarāṭci
- Local government
- Emblem
- Formation: 3 November 2021 (4 years ago)
- Founding Act: The Tambaram City Municipal Corporation Act of 2022
- Type: Municipal Corporation, with an elected Council and an appointed Commissioner.
- Country: India
- Website: Official website

Legislative Branch
- Council: Tambaram City Council
- Mayor: K. Vasanthakumari (DMK)
- Deputy Mayor: G. Kamaraj (DMK)
- Councillors: 70 Councillors Government (52); SPA (52): DMK (50); CPI(M) (1); MDMK (1); Opposition (9): AIADMK (9); Others Opposition (9): Independent (7); INC (2)
- Ex-officio member Member of Parliament and State Legislative Assembly
- Sriperumbudur (MP) Pallavaram (MLA) Tambaram (MLA): T. R. Baalu (DMK) J. Kamatchi (TVK); D. Sarathkumar (TVK)

Elections
- Last election: 19 February 2022
- Next election: 2027

Executive Branch
- Corporation Commissioner: Saranya R, IAS
- District Collector, Chengalpattu: Dr. M. Veerappan, IAS
- Commissioner of Police, Tambaram: Sanjay Kumar, IPS
- Appointed by: State Government of Tamil Nadu

Judiciary branch
- District Court: Chengalpattu District Court
- Principal Judge: T. Chandrasekaran

Tambaram City Municipal Corporation (TCMC) is a local government of the City of Tambaram within the Chennai Metropolitan Area of Tamil Nadu, India. It covers an area of 87.64 sq. km in the Chengalpattu district.

It is one of the four municipal corporations located within the Chennai Metropolitan Area, the other three being the Greater Chennai Corporation, Avadi City Municipal Corporation and Kanchipuram Municipal Corporation. Tambaram is the 20th civic body to become a municipal corporation in Tamil Nadu.

== Etymology ==
Tambaram is a medieval town referred to as Taamapuram in an inscription of the 13th century. The word was inscribed on the walls around the sanctum sanctorum at Marundeeswarar temple in Tirukachur village, near Chengalpattu.

== History ==
The earliest mention of Tambaram dates back to the 13th century when the word 'Taamapuram' was inscribed on the walls around the sanctum sanctorum at Marundeeswarar temple in Tirukachur village, near Chengalpattu.

=== Old Stone Age ===
The oldest locality in the city is Pallavapuram which is considered one of the oldest inhabited places in South Asia. Pallavapuram is most commonly known today as Pallavaram.

On 13 May 1863, Robert Bruce Foote, a British geologist with the Geological Survey of India (GSI), discovered a hand axe belonging to the Lower Palaeolithic Age at Pallavaram (Pallavapuram). Since then, several Stone Age artefacts have been discovered. Most of these artefacts are currently lodged in the Egmore museum.

=== Early Medieval Period ===
==== Pallava Dynasty ====
The oldest locality in the city, Pallavapuram, existed during the reign of Pallava king Mahendravarman I (600–630 CE). The Pallavas have left titles in early Pallava script at the cave temple in Pallavaram neighbourhood, which dates back to 600 CE. The remains of a cave shrine constructed by the Pallava ruler have been found at Asthana-E-Moula Ali Dargah.

==== Chola Dynasty ====
During the reign of Later Cholas, from ninth to twelfth century CE, the region was called Churathur Nadu. Churathur Nadu was named after Thiruchuram, the present-day Trisulam. The Churathur Nadu extended from Tambaram in the south to Adambakkam and Alandur in the north. The region included the areas of Pammal, Pallavaram, and Thiruneermalai.

=== Colonial Period ===
During the Carnatic wars in the late 17th century, the city was an entrenchment camp for the British East India Company. During the 17th century, Pallavaram neighborhood of the city remained dependent upon the Portuguese colony of San Thome. Later, the British established a cantonment at Pallavaram, supplementary to the one at St. Thomas Mount.

A wireless station was established in the early years of the 20th century. The Madras Aerodrome was opened at Pallavaram in 1929.

=== Post-Independence ===
In the 1951 census, Tambaram was classified as a Town Panchayat for the first time. In 1964, Tambaram Town Panchayat was incorporated as a Grade III Municipality by annexing the Village Panchayats of Pulikoradu, Kadapperi, Tambaram, Irumbliyur, and Selaiyur.

Due to rapid development and growth of the town commercially and residentially, the Municipality was classified as a 'Selection Grade Municipality'. The extent of the municipality was 20.72 km^{2} (8.00 sq mi). The revenue villages under this municipality are Pulikoradu, Kadapperi, Tambaram, Irumbliyur, and Selaiyur. The number of households is 26,333, the number of notified slums is 17 and the number of unnotified slums is 7. The Tambaram range comprises forest lands in Nanmangalam, Madurapakkam, Tambaram, Pulikoradu, Kumili, Vandalur, Onnamancherry, Erumaiyur, Vattampakkam and Vadakupattu.

In 2009, Tambaram taluk was trifurcated into Tambaram, Sholinganallur and Alandur taluks. Clubbing all the three taluks, a new revenue division with Tambaram as headquarters was formed.

=== City status ===
The Tambaram City Municipal Corporation was established to address administrative challenges stemming from rapid urbanization in the Tambaram region. On 24 August 2021, Tamil Nadu’s Minister for Municipal Administration, K. N. Nehru, announced a proposal in the Legislative Assembly to create the corporation by merging five municipalities (Anakaputhur, Pallavaram, Pammal, Sembakkam and Tambaram), five town panchayats (Chitlapakkam, Madambakkam, Perungaluthur, Peerkangaranai and Tiruneermalai), and 15 villages from the St Thomas Mount Panchayat Union. However, the inclusion of the villages was halted after the Supreme Court of India mandated rural local body elections by October 2021. Consequently, these villages were excluded from the final plan. The Tambaram City Municipal Corporation Act of 2022 formally established Tambaram City under the municipal corporation’s governance, incorporating only the municipalities and town panchayats. The excluded villages are anticipated to merge with the city after their elected term concludes in 2026.

== Structure ==
The executive authority in Tambaram City Municipal Corporation is vested in the Corporation Commissioner. The Corporation Commissioner is appointed by the Government of Tamil Nadu.

The Mayor, who is indirectly elected by the councillors, is the head of the municipal corporation, but the role is largely ceremonial as executive powers are vested in the Corporation Commissioner. The office of the Mayor combines a functional role of chairing the Corporation meeting as well as a ceremonial role associated with being the First Citizen of the city. Deputy Mayor is appointed by the Mayor for a five-year term.

=== Council ===
The Council is the primary governing body responsible for administering urban civic services and ensuring participatory governance.

The council comprises elected councillors representing each ward, alongside non-voting members. These non-voting members: the Member of House of the People (Lok Sabha) for the Sriperumbudur constituency; Members of the Tamil Nadu Legislative Assembly (MLAs) representing the Tambaram and Pallavaram constituencies; and any Members of the Council of States (Rajya Sabha) registered to vote within the jurisdiction of Tambaram city.

== Administrative divisions ==
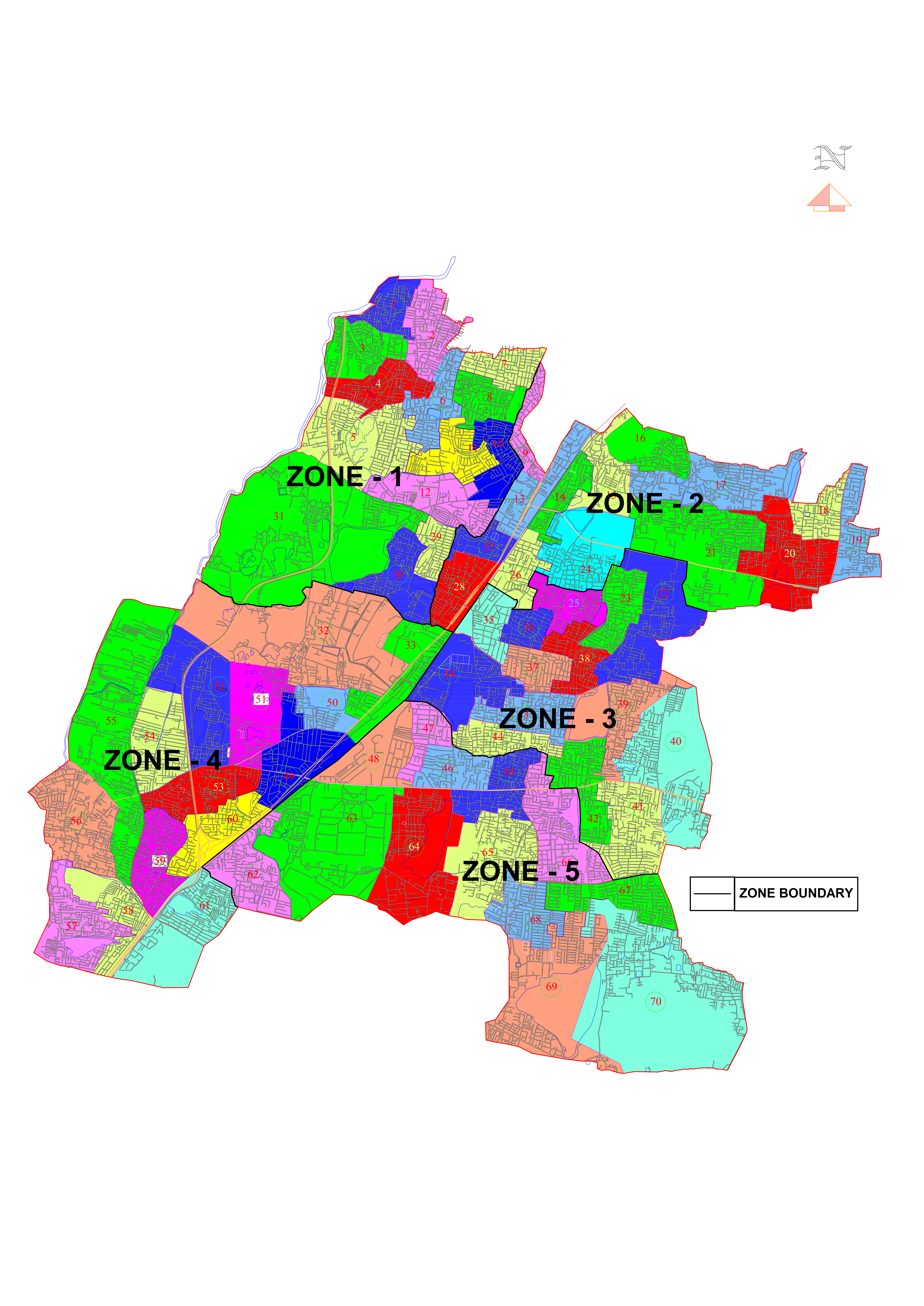
Administrative Zones of Tambaram City Municipal Corporation

=== Zones ===
When Tambaram City Municipal Corporation was established, it consisted of 70 wards under 5 zones.

Zone	Zone Name	Total Wards	Ward No	Revenue villages
1	Pammal	14	1	Anakaputhur
1	Pammal	14	2	Anakaputhur
1	Pammal	14	3	Anakaputhur
1	Pammal	14	4	Anakaputhur
1	Pammal	14	5	Anakaputhur and Pammal
1	Pammal	14	6	Pammal
1	Pammal	14	7	Pammal
1	Pammal	14	8	Pammal
1	Pammal	14	10	Pammal
1	Pammal	14	11	Pammal
1	Pammal	14	12	Pammal
1	Pammal	14	29	Thiruneermalai
1	Pammal	14	30	Thiruneermalai
1	Pammal	14	31	Thiruneermalai
2	Pallavaram	14	9	Issa Pallavaram
2	Pallavaram	14	13	Issa Pallavaram and Pallavaram
2	Pallavaram	14	14	Pallavaram
2	Pallavaram	14	15	Pallavaram
2	Pallavaram	14	16	Pallavaram
2	Pallavaram	14	17	Pallavaram
2	Pallavaram	14	18	Keelkattalai
2	Pallavaram	14	19	Keelkattalai
2	Pallavaram	14	20	Keelkattalai
2	Pallavaram	14	21	Nemilicheri and Pallavaram
2	Pallavaram	14	24	Pallavaram
2	Pallavaram	14	26	Pallavaram
2	Pallavaram	14	27	Pallavaram
2	Pallavaram	14	28	Pallavaram
3	Sembakkam	14	22	Hasthinapuram, Nemilicheri and Pallavaram
3	Sembakkam	14	23	Hasthinapuram, Nemilicheri and Pallavaram
3	Sembakkam	14	25	Hasthinapuram, Nemilicheri and Pallavaram
3	Sembakkam	14	34	Chitlapakkam
3	Sembakkam	14	35	Hasthinapuram and Pallavaram
3	Sembakkam	14	36	Hasthinapuram
3	Sembakkam	14	37	Hasthinapuram
3	Sembakkam	14	38	Hasthinapuram
3	Sembakkam	14	39	Sembakkam
3	Sembakkam	14	40	Gowrivakkam and Sembakkam
3	Sembakkam	14	41	Gowrivakkam and Rajakilpakkam
3	Sembakkam	14	42	Rajakilpakkam and Sembakkam
3	Sembakkam	14	43	Chitlapakkam
3	Sembakkam	14	44	Chitlapakkam
4	Perungalathur	15	32	Kadapperi, Pulikoradu and Tambaram
4	Perungalathur	15	33	Chitlapakkam and Kadapperi
4	Perungalathur	15	49	Tambaram
4	Perungalathur	15	50	Kadapperi and Tambaram
4	Perungalathur	15	51	Pulikoradu and Tambaram
4	Perungalathur	15	52	Pulikoradu and Tambaram
4	Perungalathur	15	53	Irumbuliyur and Tambaram
4	Perungalathur	15	54	Tambaram
4	Perungalathur	15	55	Perungalathur
4	Perungalathur	15	56	Perungalathur
4	Perungalathur	15	57	Perungalathur
4	Perungalathur	15	58	Perungalathur
4	Perungalathur	15	59	Peerkankaranai
4	Perungalathur	15	60	Irumbuliyur and Tambaram
4	Perungalathur	15	61	Peerkankaranai
5	East Tambaram	13	45	Selaiyur
5	East Tambaram	13	46	Selaiyur
5	East Tambaram	13	47	Selaiyur
5	East Tambaram	13	48	Selaiyur and Tambaram
5	East Tambaram	13	62	Irumbuliyur
5	East Tambaram	13	63	Irumbuliyur and Selaiyur
5	East Tambaram	13	64	Selaiyur
5	East Tambaram	13	65	Selaiyur
5	East Tambaram	13	66	Rajakilpakkam
5	East Tambaram	13	67	Madambakkam
5	East Tambaram	13	68	Madambakkam and Selaiyur
5	East Tambaram	13	69	Madambakkam
5	East Tambaram	13	70	Madambakkam

=== Area Sabha ===
Area Sabha is a body of all the residents registered to vote in an area within a ward. Each of the 70 wards in Tambaram is divided into nine areas for conducting Area Sabha. The Area Sabha for all the areas within a ward is convened and chaired by their respective ward Councillor. 200 residents is the minimum number necessary to constitute Area Sabha.

== Current composition ==
The Corporation Commissioner is Saranya R, IAS. The Mayor and Deputy Mayor are K. Vasanthakumari and G. Kamaraj respectively. The Commissioner of Police is Abin Dinesh Modak, IPS.

=== City council ===
The current members of the Tambaram City Council were elected in urban body elections held on19 February 2022.

Party strength in the Municipal City Council
Alliance & Parties		Ideology	Leader(s)	2022 result
Alliance & Parties		Ideology	Leader(s)	Seats
SPA	Dravida Munnetra Kazhagam	Social Democracy	M. K. Stalin	50 / 70
SPA	Indian National Congress	Social Liberalism	K. Selvaperunthagai	2 / 70
SPA	Communist Party of India (Marxist)	Communism	P. Mahalingam	1 / 70
SPA	Marumalarchi Dravida Munnetra Kazhagam	Social Democracy	Vaiko	1 / 70
AIADMK	All India Anna Dravida Munnetra Kazhagam	Social Democracy	Edappadi K. Palaniswami	9 / 70
Independent	Independent	Independent	N/A	7 / 70

== List of officials ==
=== Corporation Commissioners ===
Council (Term)	No.	Name	Term		Appointer
Council (Term)	No.	Name	Start	End	Appointer
1st (2022 — 2027)	1	M. Elangovan	3 November 2021	11 February 2023	21st Cabinet of State of Tamil Nadu
1st (2022 — 2027)	2	R. Alagumeena, IAS	12 February 2023	15 July 2024	21st Cabinet of State of Tamil Nadu
1st (2022 — 2027)	3	S. Balachander, IAS	16 July 2024	15 September 2026 (Relieved of Duty)	21st Cabinet of State of Tamil Nadu
1st (2022 — 2027)	4	Saranya R, IAS (Additional Charge)	16 September 2026	Incumbent	21st Cabinet of State of Tamil Nadu

=== Mayors ===
Council (Term)	No.	Portrait	Name	Term		Party
Council (Term)	No.	Portrait	Name	Start	End	
1st (2022 — 2027)	1		Vasanthakumari K	4 March 2022	Incumbent	DMK

=== Deputy mayors ===
Council (Term)	No.	Portrait	Name	Term		Party
Council (Term)	No.	Portrait	Name	Start	End	
1st (2022 — 2027)	1		G Kamaraj	4 March 2022	Incumbent	DMK

=== City Councils ===
Council (Term)	Term		Government		Opposition	
Council (Term)	Start	End	Parties	Seats	Parties	Seats
1st (2022 — 2027)	4 March 2022	Incumbent	DMK+	54 / 70	AIADMK	9 / 70

=== Commissioners of Police ===
Council (Term)	No.	Name	Term		Appointer
Council (Term)	No.	Name	Start	End	Appointer
1st (2022 — 2027)	1	M. Ravi	1 January 2022	31 May 2022	21st Cabinet of State of Tamil Nadu
1st (2022 — 2027)	2	A. Amalraj	6 June 2022	9 July 2024	21st Cabinet of State of Tamil Nadu
1st (2022 — 2027)	3	Abin Dinesh Modak	10 July 2024	Incumbent	21st Cabinet of State of Tamil Nadu

== Electoral history ==
=== Popular Vote ===
Council (Election)	Voter		AAP		AIADMK		BJP		CPI(M)		DMDK		DMK		INC		MDMK		NTK		PMK	
Council (Election)	Turnout	+/-	Votes	+/-	Votes	+/-	Votes	+/-	Votes	+/-	Votes	+/-	Votes	+/-	Votes	+/-	Votes	+/-	Votes	+/-	Votes	+/-
1st (2022)	51.38	—	1.05	—	24.65	—	5.98	—	0.79	—	2.62	—	39.92	—	2.26	—	0.69	—	2.02	—	1.63	—

=== Seats ===
Council (Election)	Voter		AAP		AIADMK		BJP		CPI(M)		DMDK		DMK		INC		MDMK		NTK		PMK	
Council (Election)	Turnout	+/-	Seats	+/-	Seats	+/-	Seats	+/-	Seats	+/-	Seats	+/-	Seats	+/-	Seats	+/-	Seats	+/-	Seats	+/-	Seats	+/-
1st (2022)	51.38	—	0	—	9	—	0	—	1	—	0	—	50	—	2	—	1	—	0	—	0	—

== See also ==
- List of municipal corporations in Tamil Nadu
- Tambaram
- Chennai Metropolitan Area
- Greater Chennai Corporation
- Avadi City Municipal Corporation
- Kancheepuram City Municipal Corporation
