= Anakaputhur =

- Neighbourhood
- Location in Chennai Metropolitan Area Location in Tamil Nadu Location in India
- Coordinates: 12.9828°N 80.1264°E
- Country: India
- State: Tamil Nadu
- Metro: Chennai Metropolitan Area
- District: Chengalpattu
- City: Tambaram

Population (2011)
  - Total: 48,050

Languages
  - Official: Tamil
  - Additional official: English
- Time zone: UTC+5:30 (IST)
- PINs: 600070
- Vehicle Registration: TN 85
- Lok Sabha constituency: Sriperumbudur
- State Assembly constituency: Pallavaram
- Civic Governing Body: Tambaram City Municipal Corporation
- Law enforcement agency: Tambaram City Police
- Urban Planning Agency: Chennai Metropolitan Development Authority
- Nearest Railway Station: Pallavaram railway station
- Nearest Airport: Chennai International Airport

Anakaputhur is a neighborhood in the city of Tambaram, situated within the Chennai Metropolitan Area, Tamil Nadu, India.

It is located next to Pammal on the western side. Anakaputhur was once famous for its traditional weaving business, which has declined due to modern competition. As of 2011, the town had a population of 48,050. Formerly a municipality, it was merged into Tambaram City Municipal Corporation in 2021.

== Demographics ==
Religious census
| Religion | Percent(%) |
| Hindu | 83.55% |
| Muslim | 6.01% |
| Christian | 10.09% |
| Sikh | 0.01% |
| Buddhist | 0.01% |
| Jain | 0.14% |
| Other | 0.19% |
| No religion | 0.0% |

According to the 2011 census, Anakaputhur had a population of 48,050 with a sex-ratio of 989 females for every 1,000 males, much above the national average of 929. A total of 5,404 were under the age of six, constituting 2,736 males and 2,668 females. Scheduled Castes and Scheduled Tribes accounted for 15.19% and 0.3% of the population respectively. The average literacy of the town was 78.03%, compared to the national average of 72.99%. The town had a total of 12,146 households. There were a total of 18,103 workers, comprising 24 cultivators, 126 primary agricultural labourers, 382 in household industries, 15,517 other workers, 2,054 marginal workers, 16 marginal cultivators, 20 marginal agricultural labourers, 65 marginal workers in household industries and 1,953 other marginal workers. As per the religious census of 2011, Anakaputhur had 83.55% Hindus, 6.01% Muslims, 10.09% Christians, 0.01% Sikhs, 0.01% Buddhists, 0.14% Jains, 0.19% following other religions and 0.0% following no religion or did not indicate any religious preference.

== Geography ==
Anakaputhur is located at 12.9828°N 80.1264°E.

== Temples ==
- Sri Selva Vinayagar Kovil, Anakaputhur
- Sri Srinivasa Perumal Kovil, Anakaputhur
- Krishnar Kovil
- Panduranga Swamy Kovil
- Adanji Amman Kovil, Anakaputhur
- Ayodi Amman Kovil
- Angalaparameshwari Amman Kovil
- Sri Varasakthi Vinayagar Thirukovil
- Aallavatta Amman Kovil
- Subramaniya Swamy Thirukkovil
- Arulmigu Anandavalli Sametha Agastheeswarar Temple
- Devi Shri Kanni Amman Koil
- Muthumari Amman Kovil
- The Pentecostal Mission (TPM)
- MPA Church
- Seventh Day Adventist Church
- CSI Church
- Jesus Lives Assemblies of God Church
- St. Antony's RC Church

== Theatres ==
- Ganesh Cinemas Hall
- Velco Cinemas

== Transport ==
Anakaputhur is connected to other parts of the Chennai Metropolitan Area by MTC and other private bus operators. Frequent services are available to Poonamallee, Kundrathur, Tambaram, Kilambakkam, Guduvanchery, Vandalur, Iyyapanthangal, Pattabiram, Pallavaram, Chromepet, Avadi, Keelkattalai, Thiruvallur, Hasthinapuram, Broadway, Mount Road, Adyar, Thiruporur, Padur, Thiruneermalai, and Pozhichalur. The neighborhood is served by the Pallavaram railway station of the Chennai Suburban Railway Network and the nearest airport to Anakaputhur is Chennai International Airport (3 km).

=== RTO ===
RTO: TN85

- **Office:** Kundrathur
- **Address:** 115/2D, Kundrathur Main Road, Kovur
- **Pincode:** 600122
