= Thiruneermalai =

Neighbourhood of Tambaram, India

- Neighbourhood
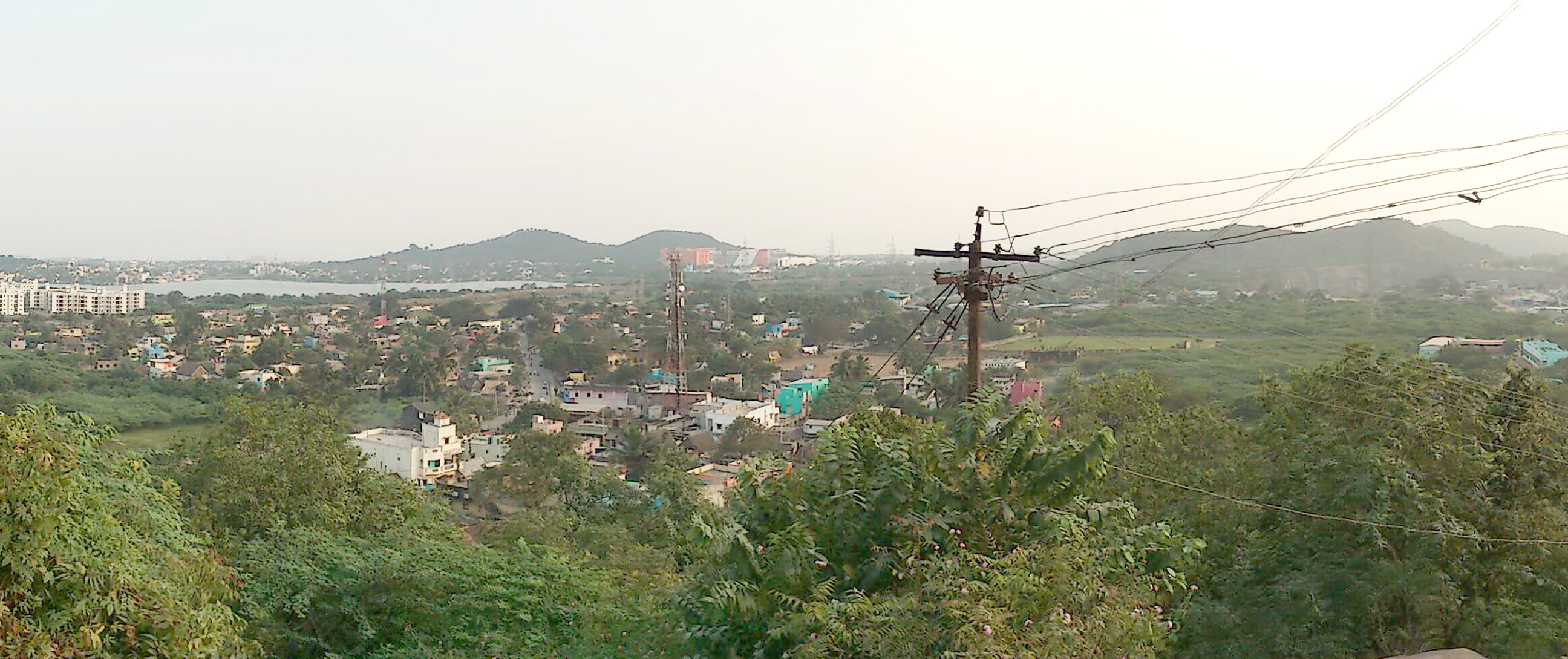
- Thiruneermalai

- Location in Chennai Metropolitan Area Location in Tamil Nadu Location in India
- Coordinates: 12.9625°N 80.1136°E
- Country: India
- State: Tamil Nadu
- Metro: Chennai Metropolitan Area
- District: Chengalpattu
- City: Tambaram

Government
  - MP: T.R. Baalu (DMK)
  - MLA: I. Karunanithi (DMK)
  - Corporation Commissioner: R. Alagumeena IAS
  - Mayor: K. Vasanthakumari (DMK)
  - Deputy Mayor: G. Kamaraj (DMK)

Languages
  - Official: Tamil
  - Additional official: English
- Time zone: UTC+5:30 (IST)
- PINs: 600132
- Law enforcement agency: Tambaram City Police
- Urban planning agency: Chennai Metropolitan Development Authority

Thiruneermalai is a neighborhood in the city of Chennai Tambaram, situated within the Chennai Metropolitan Area, Tamil Nadu, India.

Originally a town panchayat in Chengalpattu district, Thiruneermalai is now a part of Pammal Zone under Tambaram Municipal Corporation. Thiruneermalai is known for the Thiruneermalai temple complex, consisting of the Ranganatha and Thiruneermalai Neervanna Perumal Temples. Thiruneermalai area is one of the 163 notified areas (megalithic sites) in Tamil Nadu.

== Demographics ==
As of the 2001 Census of India, Thiruneermalai had a population of 19,019. Males constitute 51% of the population and females 49%. Thiruneermalai has an average literacy rate of 79%, higher than the national average of 59.5%: male literacy is 84%, and female literacy is 74%. Many of the people have college degrees. In Thiruneermalai, 11% of the population is under 14 years of age.
