= Kundrathur =

Town in Chennai, India

- Town
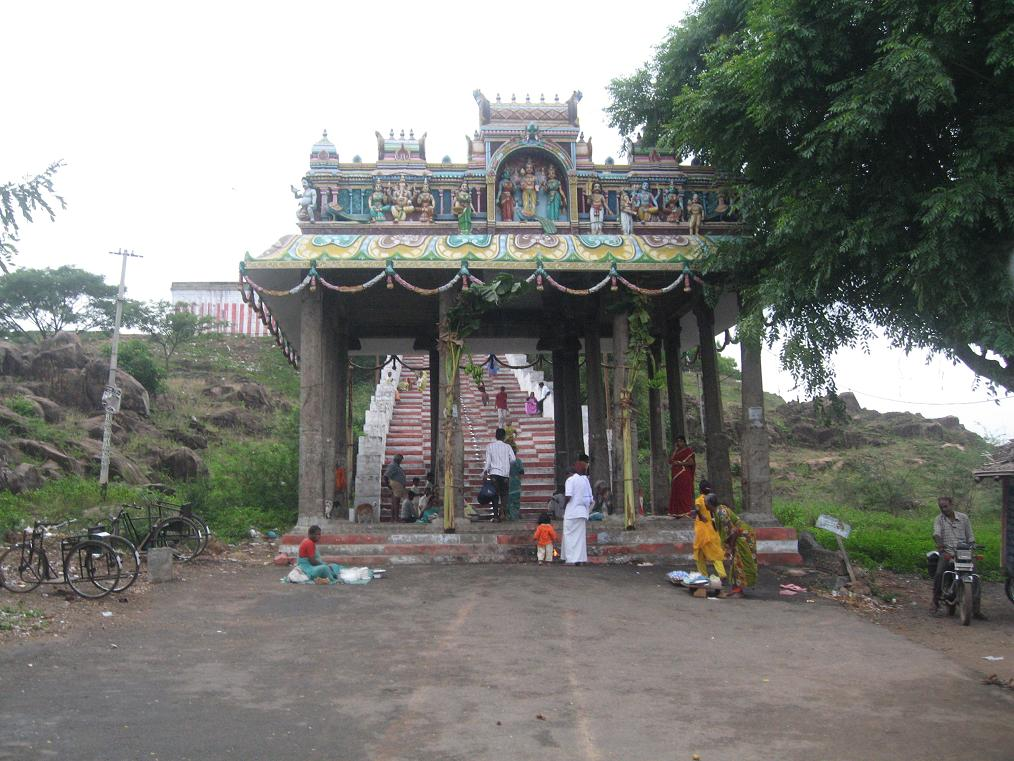
- A view of the temple mandap at foot hill along with steps
- Nickname: Temple city
- Location in Chennai, India Kundrathur (Tamil Nadu) Kundrathur (India)
- Coordinates: 12.9974°N 80.0966°E
- Country: India
- State: Tamil Nadu
- Taluk: Kundrathur
- District: Kancheepuram

Government
  - Body: Kundrathur Municipality

Area
  - Total: 42 km^{2} (16 sq mi)

Population (2011)
  - Total: 54,986
  - Density: 1,300/km^{2} (3,400/sq mi)

Languages
  - Official: Tamil
- Time zone: UTC+5:30 (IST)
- PIN: 600069
- Vehicle registration: TN-85

Kundrathur is a town located in the Chennai Metropolitan Area and the headquarters of Kundrathur taluk in Kanchipuram District. It is the birthplace of Sekkizhar, a well-known poet-saint who authored the Periyapuranam.

Gerugampakkam, Irandam Kattalai, Kolapakkam, Kolachery, Kovur, Pazhanthandalam, Periyapanicheri, Sirukalathur, Thandalam, Tharapakkam and Tirumuddivakkam village panchayats are annexed to Kundrathur Municipality

The locality is known for the Kundrathur Murugan Temple, one of the most popular temples in Chennai.

== Etymology ==
The neighbourhood is named Kundrathur due to the presence of a hill (kundru in Tamil).

== History ==
The area is one of the 163 notified areas (megalithic sites) in the state of Tamil Nadu.

== Demographics ==
As per the numbers from Census India 2011, Kundrathur has a population of 23,808 of which 11,950 are male and 11,858 are female. There are 2,817 children who form the 11.83% of the total population. The locality has a literacy rate of 76.5%. Male literacy rate stands at 80.38% while the female literacy rate is at 72.59%.

== Politics ==
Kundrathur falls under Sriperumbudur constituency. T.R.Baalu of the Dravida Munnetra Kazhagam is the Member of Parliament (MP) and Selvaperunthagai K of the Indian National Congress is the Member of Legislative Assembly (MLA)

== Places of worship ==
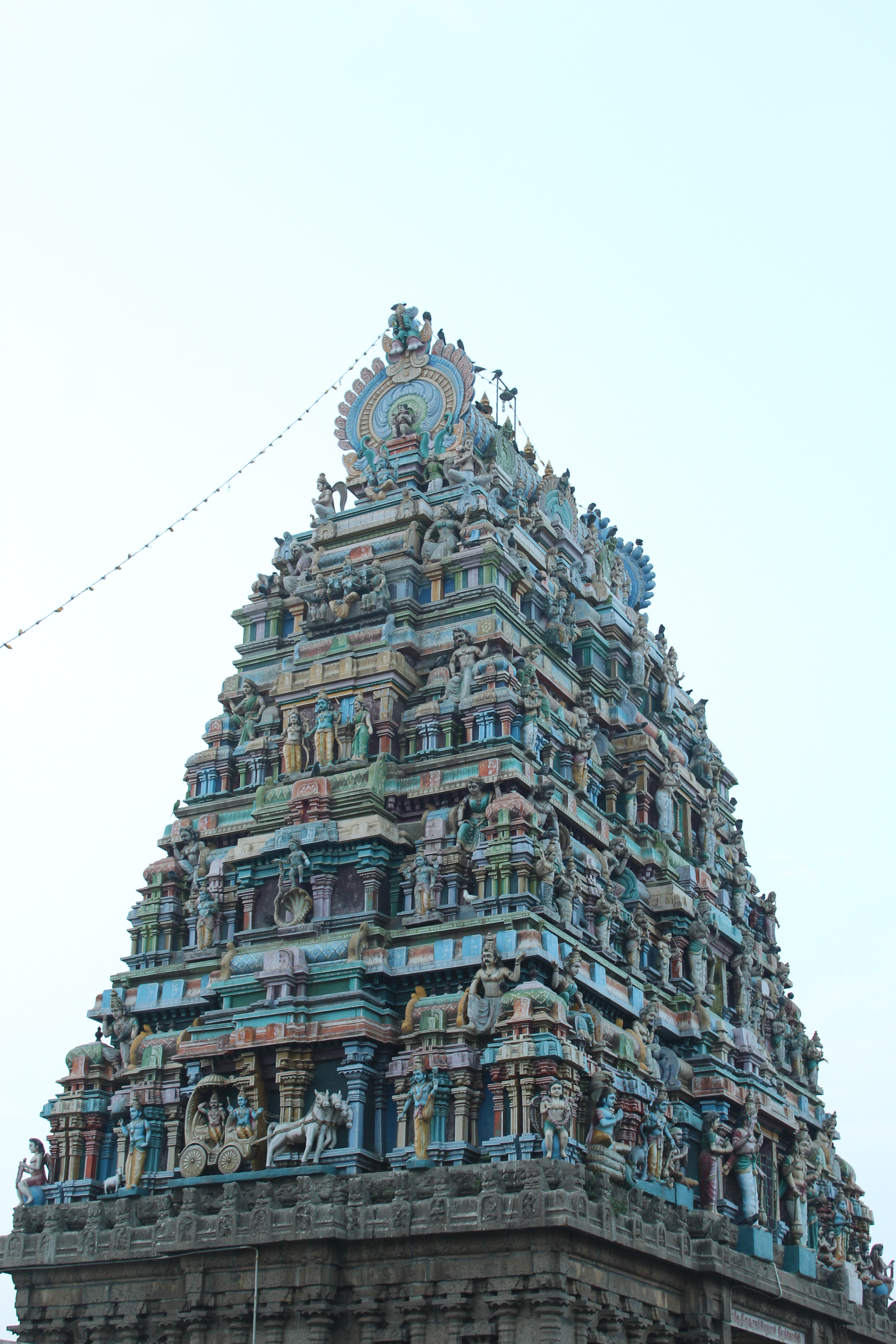
A view of the gopuram,, Arulmigu Thiruvirundhavalli Thayar Samedha Thiruvooraga Perumal Temple, Kundrathur

- Thiruvooraga Perumal Temple

The temple has a rich history that dates back to the era of the legendary Kulothunga Chola II. When the king had a disease, Lord Vishnu appeared in his dream asking the king to worship him at the iconic Ulagalantha Perumal Temple where he resides in the form of Thiruvooragan in Kancheepuram. The king visited the temple according to the words of the Lord and got rid out of his illness. As a token of love and gratitude, the king had built a temple for the Lord in Kundrathur. The deity under the name Thiruvooraga Perumal takes the form similar to the one in Tirupati along with his consort Thiruvirundhavalli Thayar. The temple also hosts Andal Nachiyar, Rama, along with Sita and Lakshmana and Hanuman. Idols of Vaishnavite gurus - Ramanuja and Periyalvar are also present near the sanctum sanctorum. The chief priest of the temple is Sri Suresh and it follows the Vaikanasa Agama of Sri Vaishnavism. The months of Purattasi and Margazhi and Vaikunda Ekadasi are important occasions.

- Thiru Nageshwarar Temple

The temple is simply known as Thirunageshwaram and it is regarded as a parihara sthalam for Rahu. It was built by the celebrated Shaivaite poet Sekkizhar where Lord Shiva appears in the form of Thiru Nageshwarar along with his consort Parvati as Kamakshi just outside the sanctum sanctorum. Apart from them, the temple also houses Lord Vinayaka, Lord Dakshinamurthy, Lord Vishnu, Goddess Lakshmi, Goddess Saraswati, Lord Muruga with his consorts Valli and Deivayanai, Lord Brahma, Lord Chandiheshwara, Goddess Durga, Lord Bhairava, the Navagrahas and Lord Saneeshwaran. Idols of several Shaivaite gurus including Sekkizhar are seen. Devotees throng temple during Maha Shivaratri, Anna Abhishekam, Arudra Darishanam and other important religious occasions. The larger belief is that Lord Shiva here is none other than Rahu himself and worshipping him will give devotees all sorts of fortunes in life.

- Murugan Temple

Perhaps one of the most popular temples in Chennai is also the only temple in the state of Tamil Nadu where Lord Muruga stands facing north. According to Hindu scriptures, Lord Muruga stayed on this very hill during his travel from Thiruporur to Tiruttani. The temple was constructed by King Kulothunga Chola II and its speciality lies in its sanctum sanctorum where Lord Muruga could be seen with only one of his consorts at a time though he appears with both. When viewed from one side he can be seen along with Valli while when viewed from the other side he could be seen with Deivayanai. The temple houses many deities including Lord Vinayaka, Lord Shiva, Lord Bairava, the Navagrahas, Lord Dakshinamurthy and Goddess Durga. The temple has around 84 steps but devotees are also allowed to drive up the hill. Thaipusam, Thaikiruthigai and Mahasashti are important occasions.

- Kandhaleeshwarar Temple

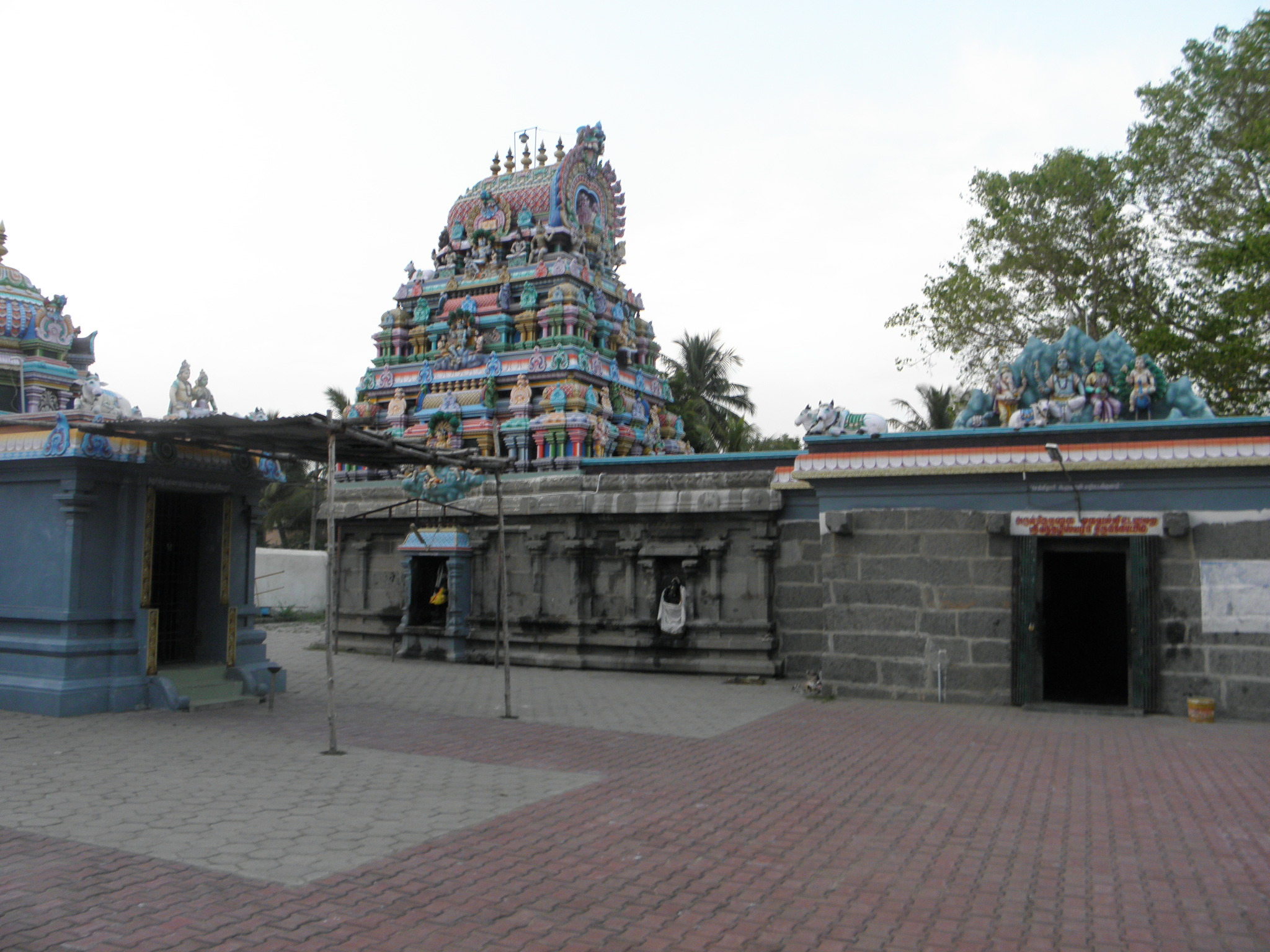
Kandhaleeshwarar Temple

This Shaivaite temple is just a few metres away from the Murugan temple. The history of the temple is that Lord Muruga during his stay at the hills placed a Shivling and worshipped him. The sanctum sanctorum hosts the same Shivling as "Kandleeshwarar" to which Lord Muruga performed his pooja. Parvati appears in the form of Nagai Mukha Valli. The temple has other deities including Lord Surya, Goddess Durga, Lord Bairava, the Navagrahas and Lord Chandiheshwara. There are idols of all 63 Nayanmars and special rock art on Kannappa Nayanar.

- Nagathamman Temple

This temple is located at the entrance of the town. The deity here is Nagathamman who takes the form of serpents and is worshipped as a guardian deity.

- Ponniyamman Temple

This temple is situated half a km away from Thiru Nageshwarar temple. Goddess Ponniyamman, a form of Parvati is the chief deity here. The goddess is believed to be the guardian deity for a lot of people living in the locality.

- Devi Katyayani Temple

This temple is located near Thiruvooraga Perumal temple. Goddess Katyayani, another form of Parvati is the main deity. It is believed that worshipping her would lead to a happy married life.

- Thondai Mandala Vinayagar Temple

The temple is located half a km away from the main bus stand. Lord Vinayaka is the chief deity and there's a separate shrine within the temple for Lord Ayyappa. Other deities include Lord Hanuman, Lord Dakshinamurthy, Goddess Durga, Navagrahas and others. Devotees in large numbers gather here for "irumudi kattu" before their pilgrimage to the Sabarimala. Lord Vinayaka seen under the Jand tree is another speciality here.

- Methaleeshwarar Temple

This temple is located in the residential area of Metha Nagar. Constructed through funds raised by the area's welfare association, the temple hosts Lord Shiva as Methaleeshwarar at the sanctum sanctorum along with Goddess Abhayambika. Other deities include Lord Krishna, Lord Hanuman, Goddess Durga, Goddess Lakshmi, Lord Dakshinamurthy, Lord Chandiheshwara, the Navagrahas and other benevolent forms of Parvati. The temple's consecration happened under the presence of Srila Sri Arunagirinatha Gnanasambantha Desika Paramacharya of the Madurai Adheenam.

- Madathu Manthara Vinayagar Aalayam(Temple)

This temple is located beside the Thiru Nageshwarar Temple, right on the South side of the Temple pool (Kovil Kulam). The deity here is Lord Ganesha it is one of the oldest temple in Kundrathur, with a larger number of local Devotees.

== Education ==
There are a couple of CBSE and state board schools in and around the locality.

- Mukkala Nammalwar Chetty Vivekananda Vidyalaya, a unit of Vivekananda Educational Society
- Peace On Green Earth Public School
- Little Flower Matriculation Higher Secondary School
- Sivanthi Public School
- Sree Shanthi Anand Vidyalaya

== Neighbourhood newspapers ==
"Ideas" was the first neighbourhood newspaper but the circulation was stopped later. The locality at the moment does not have any dedicated neighbourhood newspaper.

== Notable people ==
- Sekkizhar, 12th-century saint
- Tha Mo Ambarasan, minister for rural industries, cottage industries, small industries and slum clearance board, Government of Tamil Nadu.
- M. B. Nirmal, founder of ExNoRa Innovators International
