= Chennai Monorail =

Indian rapid transit system

Overview
- Native name: சென்னை மோனோரெயில்
- Locale: Chennai, Tamil Nadu
- Transit type: straddle-beam Monorail
- Number of lines: 3 (Phase I)
- Headquarters: Chennai

Operation
- Operation will start: 2018 (Estd. But later plan was cancelled and Chennai metro was constructed)
- Train length: 4 coaches
- Headway: 3 minutes

Technical
- System length: 57 km (Phase I)
- Electrification: 750 V DC
- Average speed: 65 km/h (40 mph)
- Top speed: 80 km/h (50 mph)

Chennai Monorail was a proposal for a number of lines as part of mass transit system for the Indian city of Chennai. Originally the city planned to use monorail on all lines but many were subsequently changed to railways as part of the Chennai Metro.

In 2006 a system was proposed in the Long-term Urban Transportation Scheme of Second Master Plan by Chennai Metropolitan Development Authority (CMDA). The state government announced plans to introduce monorail across the city to reduce traffic congestion and to increase the share of public transport in the urban transport network. The aim is to increase the share of public transport in Chennai from 27% to 46% by 2026.

The first tender was requested in 2011 but conditions were watered down several times. Tenders have lapsed thrice after failing to attract bidders. In the 2014 plan there were three remaining monorail corridors. As of January 2015, only two bidders remain after the Request For Qualification process of the ongoing bidding attempt.

In 2018 the first corridor using monorail was approved by the government. However, in 2020 one line originally designated at a monorail was converted to railway and let to tender by Chennai Metro. In 2020 the Chennai Metro sought tenders for the Porur to Poonamallee line to be built as a railway metro.

== History ==
The Tamil Nadu Government invited bids for the 'Elevated Monorail Mass Rapid Transit System' (EMMRTS) monorail project covering over 300 km to be implemented at a single phase. Soon after a public interest litigation was filed in High Court, Chennai against awarding of the contract and the court ordered the government not to award the final contract without its prior permission. Since chances of the metro rail getting approval by central government which consisted of archrival DMK, were remote, the less expensive mono rail was preferred. A total of 18 corridors had been proposed. Had the project been executed, it would have been the biggest monorail project in the planet dwarfing any other monorail in the world. However, soon she was voted out of power and the monorail project was shelved. Again, when the new AIADMK government came to power in 2011, the Chief Minister Jayalalithaa, through the Governor Surjit Singh Barnala's address to the assembly, stated that the Chennai Monorail project of around 300 km will be revived and would supplement the existing metro rail systems that were implemented with assistance from Japanese loans and central government funding.

=== Proposed corridors in 2006 ===
The following 18 corridors were proposed to be completely built within 18 months.

Origin	Destination	Length (km)	Common Length (km)
Parrys	Guduvanchery	42	
Parrys	Poonamalle	22.4	2
Parrys	Porur	17.2	8
Parrys	Avadi	25.2	2
Parrys	Red Hills	19	
Parrys	Parrys	42.3	7
Parrys	Manali New Town	23.3	4
Parrys	Kelambakkam	39.2	
Halda	Medavakkam	12.3	
Anna Statue	Adyar O.T.	8.5	2
Virugambakkam	Santhome	12	0.2
Egmore	MFL Junction	19.2	0.5
Saidapet	Anna Nagar Roundabout	10.5	0.5
Salaima Nagar	Kannadasan Nagar	2.7	
Ayanavaram	Anna Square	10.2	1.5
Aminjikarai	Ambattur Estate	6.4	3
Gandhi Statue	Nathamuni	13.2	2
F.S. Estate	Nungambakkam	11	0.2

Total Route Length – 333.1 km
Common Length – 32.9 km
Track Length – 300.2 km

=== Corridors proposed in second master plan ===
Two corridors have been proposed in the Second Master Plan by CMDA. These corridors have been proposed as a feeder service for Chennai MRTS, Chennai Metro, Chennai Suburban Railway and Metropolitan Transport Corporation.

Corridor 1: Dams Road Junction - Royapettah - Thiruvanmayur - Adyar - Guindy (Halda Junction)
Corridor 2: Lighthouse MRTS Station - Anna flyover - Kilpauk - Perambur

=== Planned corridors (Phase I) ===
The Four corridors have been identified based on a feasibility study prepared by the Pallavan Transport Consultancy Services Ltd. A crisscrossing network of monorail corridors, running to a total length of 111 km with four corridors, is being planned by the State government and plans to complete the first phase of the monorail project within two years. The network includes a 54-km link between Vandalur and Puzhal, which when completed would be the longest anywhere in the world. The developer will be responsible to (DBFOT) design, construct, finance, own, maintain and transfer the project after a period of 30 years. Monorail stations would be aesthetically designed, with minimal use of concrete. Initially, a four-car monorail train is expected to run along an elevated narrow guide way that would come up on the road median. The capacity of one train would be about 560 passengers, which translates to a capacity of about 10,000 passengers per hour per direction.

Origin	Destination	Length (km)	Via
Vandalur Via Mudichur	Puzhal	54	Perungalathur, Tambaram, MEPZ, Pallavaram, Pammal, Kundrathur, Mangadu, Kumananchavadi, Karayanchavadi, Paruthipattu, Goverthanagiri, Avadi, Thirumullaivoyal, Ambattur O.T, Pudur, Surapet, Puzhal
Vandalur	Velachery	23	Perungalathur, Irumbuliyur, Tambaram East, Selaiyur camp road, Sembakkam, Gowriwakkam, Medavakkam, Pallikaranai, Narayanapuram, Velachery.
Poonamallee	Kathipara	16	Poonamallee, Kumananchavadi, Karayanchavadi, Kattupakkam, Iyyappanthangal, SRMC Hospital, Porur, Ramapuram, Nandambakkam, Butt Road, Kathipara Junction
Poonamallee	Vadapalani	18	Poonamallee, Karayanchavadi, Kumananchavadi, Velappanchavadi, Vanagaram, Maduravoyal, Alapakkam, Porur, Valasaravakkam, Virugambakkam, Vadapalani Junction

=== Revised corridors (Phase I) ===
The State government has decided to drop one of the four monorail lines that were supposed to be built in the city. While originally an ambitious 111-km long Phase-I network was proposed to be constructed the revised target means the monorail grid would be only 57 km. The corridor from Vandalur to Puzhal via Avadi (54 km) has been axed because it runs through "undeveloped areas with no pre-existing traffic in the alignment", making it "financially unviable". If it had been built, it would have been the longest monorail corridor in the world.

The revised 57-km long Phase-I of Chennai Monorail is estimated to cost ₹ 80,500 million. It is proposed to constitute a network of three elevated corridors—Vandalur to Velachery via Tambaram East (23 km); Poonamallee to Kathipara via Porur (16 km); and Poonamallee to Vadapalani via Valasarawakkam (18 km). The fourth line may be considered in the subsequent phases of the project. He said several monorail manufacturers had expressed the non-viability of building a 54-km monorail line (Vandalur to Puzhal) using existing technologies even during the previous tendering process. In the second phase, Asia's longest monorail corridor from Vandalur to Puzhal would be taken up.

Origin	Destination	Length (km)	Stations	Via
Vandalur	Velachery	23	14	Perungalathur, Irumbuliyur, Tambaram East, Selaiyur camp road, Sembakkam, Gowriwakkam, Medavakkam, Pallikaranai, Narayanapuram, Velachery.
Poonamallee	Kathipara	16	11	Poonamallee, Karayanchavadi, Kumananchavadi, Kattupakkam, Iyyappanthangal, SRMC Hospital, Porur, Ramapuram, Nandambakkam, Butt Road, Kathipara Junction
Poonamallee	Vadapalani	18	12	Poonamallee, Karayanchavadi, Kumananchavadi, Velappanchavadi, Vanagaram, Maduravoyal, Alapakkam, Porur, Valasaravakkam, Virugambakkam, Vadapalani Junction

The much-anticipated monorail is expected to have nearly three dozen stations in Chennai and its suburbs. The stations will come up at places that are good crowd generation points. The locations under consideration will have sufficient space for accommodating a station. The accessibility to these stations is also taken into consideration. An expert team was formed to scout for monorail stations sites. The team, comprising personnel from MTC, PTCS and a private consultancy firm, were given a time period of ten days to study and come up with sites where monorail stations can come up. Poonamallee and Vadapalani stations are expected to get monorail depots, where the monorails could be berthed and maintained. The Kathipara station will boast of the multi-modal transport system with the monorail integrating with MRTS, Metro Rail, and EMU service.

== Stations ==
(to be updated; pending announcement for updated corridor-2 alignment)

A total of 37 stations on paper, in reality it will be 34 as the monorails running between Poonamallee and Kathipara and Poonamallee to Vadapalani stretches will be halting at two common stations (Karayanchavadi and Kumananchavadi besides the source station Poonamallee). The first Corridor – Vandalur to Velachery (23 km) — will have 14 stations, 12 stations will come up along the Poonamallee - Vadapalani Corridor (18 km) and 11 along the third corridor – Poonamallee to Kathipara junction (16 km).

== Tender process ==
- 15 August 2011: The Metropolitan Transport Corporation (MTC), the nodal agency for implementing the project has called for Submission of Request for Qualification (RFQ) for the proposed Chennai Monorail Mass Rapid Transit System on Design, Build, Finance, Operate and Transfer (DBFOT) Basis. The role of Tamil Nadu state government will be limited to fixing fares based on a concessionaire agreement.
- 8 September 2011: Pre-bid conference for monorail project held. It was an opportunity for prospective bidders to seek clarifications about the scope of the project and the tendering process. Over 10 entities attended the pre-bid meeting, only three – L&T-Hitachi and firms from Malaysia and the United Kingdom – cleared the technical criteria set by the government. The pre-qualification stage of the bidding process initiated by the State government would come to a close on 28 September.
- 1 December 2011: The State government took a decision to re-float the tender for the construction of a 111-km-long monorail network in the city. Chief Minister Jayalalithaa expressed unhappiness over the pace at which the monorail project was progressing at a review meeting. There was a suggestion to re-float the tender to see if there would be more participation, but a final decision took shape early this week. A Mumbai-based firm, Fortress Financial Service, has been nominated as the official consultant for the project.
- 25 January 2012: Pre-application conference was held at the Metropolitan Transport Corporation headquarters, Chennai. This is the first step of the fresh global competitive bidding process which was initiated on 1 December after the previous tender was annulled because of limited participation. All applicants would have to submit their proposal by 20 February, following which the government's Empowered Monorail Committee would pre-qualify and shortlist suitable applicants. The 'qualified' applicants would enter a round of financial bidding. A two-month period is likely to be given to prepare a Detailed Project Report for the implementation of a monorail system along four elevated corridors, totaling 111-km.
- 22 February 2012: Hyderabad-based Capital Fortunes Private Limited (CFPL) will assist the monorail cell in identifying the implementing agency for the monorail project. The implementing agency will also soon be finalized as the officials are all set to open the financial bid documents on 19 March. This apart, officials denied reports that one of the four proposed lines Vandalur to Puzhal would be axed. "Though it has been decided to go with three corridors, the Vandalur to Puzhal stretch is still in the reckoning. The bids will be floated for the corridor separately. The alignment will be broken into two portions."
- 19 March 2012: The government opened the financial bids received for the much-awaited, ₹ 80,500 million monorail project. Received financial bids from eight reputed developers across the world which would be scrutinised by the Hyderabad-based consultancy firm. It is learnt that it would take at least two weeks to finalise the developer. The empowered monorail committee, headed by the chief secretary is authorized to take a final call. Some participants are Malaysian firm Scomi international, players from Spain (Kafe India), Japan (Hitachi) and China have participated in the tendering process.
- 5 June 2012: The government finalising five project developers for the second and final stage, while rejecting three firms' bids at the opening phase, after a high-level discussion "Of the eight consortia of firms that had participated in the initial stage of bidding process (request for qualification), three firms, including Met-rail, M-rail, have been disqualified, while five other firms, including Scomi International private limited, Hitachi and Bombardier, L&T, and Gammon and IL&FS have qualified for the final stage - request for proposals,". The project promoters for the next stage were finalised after a meeting of the empowered committee headed by chief secretary and secretaries of a few other departments.
- 25 August 2014: The state government has relaxed certain norms in response to the queries by applicants and as per the revised schedule, RFQ documents are to be submitted before 9 September 2014. The government plans to award the contract by 10 November 2014.
- 17 August 2015: The two bidders remaining in the fray have been raising unrealistic queries which makes the seriousness of their bids suspect in the view of transport officials.

== Project cost ==
The 111-km long, first phase of the Chennai Monorail project is proposed at a cost of ₹ 166.50 billion. The per-kilometre cost of the Chennai monorail will be around ₹ 1.50 billion. The revised 54-km-long, phase-I of the monorail is estimated to cost ₹ 80.50 billion.

== Inter modal transit facilities ==
- Chennai suburban railway network: Tambaram, Velacherry, Arakkonam
- Chennai MTC bus terminuses: Satellite Mofussil bus terminus planned at Tambaram, Velachery.
- Southern Railway: Tambaram.
- TNSTC: Tambaram, Vadapalani and Kathipara Junction.

== See also ==
- Transport in Chennai
- Rapid transit in India
- Chennai MRTS, a first generation metro system in Chennai.
- Chennai Metro, a metro system under construction.
