= Pallavaram–Kundrathur–Poonamallee Road =

Arterial Road in Chennai, Tamil Nadu, India

State Highway 113A
- Pallavaram–Kundrathur–Poonamallee Road; Pallavaram–Kundrathur–Poonamallee High Road; Pammal Main Road

Route information
- Maintained by State Highways
- Length: 8.1 mi (13.0 km) The 8.1-mile stretch refers to the stretch from Grand Southern Trunk Road, Pallavaram in the south to the Trunk Road, Poonamallee in the west.

Major junctions
- South end: Grand Southern Trunk Road at Pallavaram, Chennai
- West end: Trunk Road, Kumananchavadi, Poonamallee, Chennai

Location
- Country: India
- State: Tamil Nadu

Highway system
- Roads in India; Expressways; National; State; Asian; State Highways in Tamil Nadu

Pallavaram–Kundrathur–Poonamallee Road or State Highway 113A is an arterial road in Chennai City connecting Grand Southern Trunk Road in Pallavaram with Trunk Road in Kumananchavadi in Poonamallee running for a length of 13 kilometres (8.1 mi). The road is also known as Pammal Main Road. The road runs through Pammal, Anakaputhur, Kundrathur, Mangadu and Kumanan Chavadi.

About 4 km of the road is located in Pallavaram Taluk of Chengalpattu District, the part of Kundrathur Taluk of Kancheepuram District and remaining part is located in Poonamallee Taluk of Thiruvallur District.

== Light Rail Connectivity ==
As part of the Chennai Monorail Plan, Corridor 1 Plan for the Chennai Monorail includes 54 km long route from Vandalur to Puzhal via Pallavaram - Kundrathur - Poonamallee Road through Pallavaram, Pammal, Anakaputhur, Kundrathur, Mangadu, Kumananchavadi, Govardhanagiri, Avadi Market, Ambattur OT and Puzhal.

Later, Lighthouse - Poonamallee Route which was proposed for Monorail Project has been taken over by Chennai Metrorail and Vandalur - Velachery Monorail Project has been taken over by CMRL as part of Chennai Light Rail Connectivity between Tambaram and Velachery. Then the route is expected to be taken over for Chennai Light Rail between Pallavaram and Poonamallee which will be extended to Ambattur Industrial Estate and then reach Koyambedu as per Chennai Comprehensive Transportation Study by Chennai Metropolitan Development Authority.

== Road junctions ==
Some important junctions along SH 113A provides connectivity with other adjoining areas.

Road Junctions in Pammal

Pammal–Pozhichalur Road (Ambedkar Salai) connects Pammal with Pozhichalur and Cowl Bazaar Villages.

Pammal Kamarajar Salai connects Pammal Main Road with Pammal Nallathambi Road, Signal Office, Pozhichalur and Cowl Bazaar.

Pammal Anna Salai links Pammal with Nagalkeni.

Pammal–Thiruneermalai Road connects Pammal with Service Road along Chennai Bypass, Thiruneermalai, Thirumudivakkam towards Chennai Outer Ring Road.

Road Junctions in Kundrathur

Kundrathur–Sriperumbudur Road connects Kundrathur with Chennai Outer Ring Road, Sriperumbudur and Kanchipuram.

Kundrathur–Porur Road connects Kundrathur with Kovoor, Gerugambakkam, Porur, Vanagaram and Iyappanthangal.

Road Junctions in Mangadu

Mangadu Main Road connects Mangadu with Pattur, Kovoor and Moulivakkam.

Mangadu Link Road connects Mangadu with Chennai Outer Ring Road.

Road Junctions in Kumananchavadi

Poonamallee–Avadi High Road links Kumananchavadi with Senneerkuppam and Avadi.

== Upgradation works in road ==
The road from Pallavaram–Kundrathur stretch is narrow and commuters along the road demands widening of the road. Due to short width of the road, the road was proposed for expansion to 80 feet between Pallavaram and Anakaputhur and 100 feet between Anakaputhur and Kundrathur.

The State Highways Department announced to provide warning sign boards and lights along the road to make commuters aware of dangerous patches due to incomplete road works in Mangadu along Kundrathur–Poonamallee Section of the Road.
