= Skandhashramam Temple, Chennai =

Chennai Om Sri Skandhashramam
- Skandashramam Temple, Rajakilpakkam, Tambaram, Tamil Nadu Skandhashramam Temple, Chennai (Tamil Nadu)

Religion
- Affiliation: Hinduism
- District: Chennai
- Deity: Swaminatha Swami (Lord Murugan)
- Festivals: Skanda Sashti in October–November; Tirukarthikai in November–December; monthly Sankatahara Chaturthi; Vinayaka Chaturthi in August–September; Amavasya (the new moon days) and Hanuman Jayanthi

Location
- Location: 1 Kambar Street, Mahalakshmi Nagar, Rajakilpakkam, Selaiyur
- State: Tamil Nadu
- Country: India
- Interactive map of Chennai Om Sri Skandhashramam
- Coordinates: 12.9206°N 80.1485°E

Architecture
- Type: Hindu temple architecture
- Completed: 1999

Specifications
- Temple: One
- Elevation: 31.53 m (103 ft)

Website
- http://www.skandasramam.com/

Chennai Om Sri Skandashramam is a Hindu temple dedicated to the deity Murugan (Swaminatha Swami) in Chennai, India. It is located at Selaiyur, Tambaram, a southern neighbourhood of Chennai. The temple is known of its huge idols of several deities, including Kamala Siddhi Vinayakar, Panchamukha Heramba Ganapathy, Dattatreya, Panchamukha Hanuman, Shaniswara, Ayyapan, goddess Ashtadashabhuja Durga Parameswari, Sarabeswara (form of Shiva), goddess Prathiyankira, goddess Bhuvaneshwari, Swaminathaswamy (chief deity at the temple), Sudarshanachakathalwar, Lakshmi Narasimhar, Maha Sahasralingamurthy (1008 lingams), Nandikeswarar, goddess Annapurani and Chakra Poorna Maha Meru. There is also an idol of Saint Sathguru Santhananda Swamigal, who built the temple.

== History ==
Chennai Om Sri Skandhashramam temple was consecrated by Saint Swami Santhananda on 24 June 1999. Before building the temple at Chennai, Shanthananda Swamigal also built the Judge Swamigal Adhishtanam at Pudukkottai, Om Sri Skandasramam at Salem and Dattagiri at Sendamangalam. The temple is dedicated to goddess Ugraprathyangira Devi and god Sarabheswara. This is said to be the first temple in India to have been dedicated to goddess Ugraprathyangira Devi. It is also said to be the first temple of god Sarabheswara constructed in modern times. There is an old Chola temple dedicated to Lord Sarabheswara at Thribhuvanam near Thanjavur, also in Tamil Nadu. Swami Santhananda died before the completion of the temple.

== Idols ==
There are life-size idols of various gods and goddesses in the temple, some of them larger-than-life sized. The most imposing of all is the Sahasralingam, a huge stone lingam (form of God Shiva) measuring 9.5 feet in height and weighing 20 tons, which has 1007 lingams carved within, with a Nandhi (the bull) measuring 5 feet long and 4 feet high facing the lingam. Other deities in the temple are Panchamukha Heramba Ganapathy, Kamala Siddhi Vinayakar, Bhuvaneshwari Amman, Panchamukha Aanjaneyar, Veera Sarabeswarar, Saniswarar, Swaminathaswamy (Skanda), Dattatreyar, Prathyankara Devi, Sri Chakra Maha Meru, Ayyapan, Ashtadasabhuja Durga Parameswari, Sudarshana Chakrathazhwar, Lakshmi Narasimhar.

The meditation hall is located at the forecourt in front of the sanctums (Sannidhies) of the four main deities. The hall accommodates the Maha Meru (Sri Chakra) at its centre.

Idols at the temple
S.No.	Idol	Material	Height	Gopuram (dome) architecture	Description
1	God Panchamukha Heramba Ganapathi	Stone	12 feet	Orissa type	Idol of God Ganesha, seated on a lion vaahanam (mount). Has five elephant heads, with four faces facing the four directions and the fifth one facing the sky, and ten arms holding the noose, goad, rudraksha garland, pownder, battle axe and cord. Sanctums of Bala Ganapathy and Lakshmi Ganapathy are situated nearby.
2	God Kamala Siddhi Vinayagar	Stone	6.5 feet	Tamil Nadu type	Idol of God Ganesha, seated on a lotus with a flower, mango, sugarcane and parasu in his four arms and the kalasam in his trunk. Situated to the right of Goddess Bhuvaneswari. Idols of Yoga Ganapathy and Uchchista Ganapathy are installed around this sanctum.
3	Goddess Bhuvaneshwari	Stone	6 feet	Tamil Nadu type	Idol of Goddess Parvathi. With two arms in abhaya and varada postures, the goddess holds the noose and angusam in the upper arms. The idols of other Dasamahavidya deities, namely, Kali, Tara, Shodasi, Tripurabhairavi, Cinnamastha, Dhumavati, Bagalamuki, Rajamathangi, and Kamalathmika are installed around the sanctum.
4	Saint Shantanada Swamigal	Marble	4.5 feet	Tamil Nadu type	Idol of the saint who built the temple. Located on the left of Goddess Bhuvaneswari.
5	God Panchamukha Anjaneya	Stone	14 feet	Orissa type	Idol of God Hanuman. Located at the vaayu moolai (northwest corner) opposite God Sanishwara. The idol has five faces that are the embodiment of God Hanuman facing the east, God Narasimha facing the south, Garuda facing the west, God Varahaa facing the north and God Hayagriva at the top. Idols of Bhakta Hanuman and Veera Hanuman are installed around this sanctum.
6	God Veera Sarabeswarar		12 feet	Tamil Nadu type	Idol of God Sarabeshwara with a lion's face and bird's wings, with the two wings bearing Goddess Prathiyankara and Goddess Soolini. The arms of the idol hold a deer, battle axe, snake and fire, and Gods Bhairava and Agni are found in his abdomen. Installed around the sanctum are idols of Ashta Bhairavars—Achithanga, Ruru, Chanda, Krodana, Kabala, Unmatha, Bheeshana, Samkara, and svarnakarshana.
7	God Sanishwara	Stone	14 feet	Orissa type	Idol of the God of planet Saturn in the standing posture with one leg on his mount, the crow, and the other on the ground. Located in the easanya moolai (northeast corner), opposite God Panchamukha Hanuman. Idols of different forms of God Sanishwara are installed around this sanctum.
8	God Swaminatha Swamy	Stone	12 feet	Tamil Nadu type	Idol of God Murugan. Located facing the Bhuvaneshwari sannadhi. Idols of various forms of God Murugan in the Arupadai veedu (Swamimalai, Tirutani, Tiruparankundram, Palani, Pazhamudircholai, Tiruchendur) and the one at Kadirkamam, in addition to Lord Balamurugan and Lord Subramanyaswami, are installed around this sanctum.
9	God Dattatreya	Stone	15 feet	Orissa type	Idol of God Dattatreya with three heads and six hands holding a trident, rosary, lotus, discus, conch and a water pot. Installed in the agni moolai (southeast corner) opposite Panchamukha Heramba Ganapathy. Idols of Gods Brahma, Vishnu and Shiva are installed around this sanctum.
10	Goddess Ugra Prathiyankara	Panchaloha	12 feet	Tamil Nadu type	Idol of Goddess Atharvana Bhadrakali, a lion-faced goddess seated on a lion, with her four hands bearing a noose in the form of a snake, trident, hand-drum and bowl (kabaala paathram) and wearing a garland of skulls. Located facing the sanctum of God Veera Sarabeswara. Idols of Navadurgas, namely, Sailaputri, Brahmacharini, Chandrakande, Kushmande, Skandamatha, Kathayayini, Kalarathri, Mahagauri and Sidhithathri are installed around this sanctum. The idol of Soolini Durga, installed at the feet of Ugra Prathiyankara Devi idol, is three feet tall and also made of panchaloha. This idol depicts Goddess Durga with eight arms riding her lion.
11	Goddess Chakra Poorna Maha Meru		5.5 feet	Tamil Nadu type	Personification of Goddess Sakthi. Installed at the centre.
12	God Ayyappa	Panchaloha	7 feet	Kerala type	Idol of God Ayyappa in a sitting posture, with the right hand showing the gnana mudra and the left one showing the vara mudra. The sanctum is towards the east, facing the Astadasabhuja Durga. The idol of Kanni Moolai Ganapathy is installed to the right.
13	Goddess Ashtadasabuja Durga Parameswari		6 feet	Tamil Nadu type	Idol of Goddess Parvathi's incarnation mounted on a lion, with her 18 hands holding various weapons, including the trident of God Shiva, the discus of God Vishnu, the conch of Varuna, the bow and arrows of Vayu, and the vajra of Indra. Installed in the southern part of the temple, behind the Sahasralingam, facing the north.
14	God Maha Sudarshana Murthy (Chakarathazhwar) with Lakshmi Narasimhar	Panchaloha	18 feet		This idol is unique in the sense that it has God Sudarshana Murthy on the obverse and God Lakshmi Narasimhar (along with his consort Goddess Lakshmi) on the reverse, with Bhaktha Prahlada standing in its right side, for it is generally Yoga Narasimhar who is found in the reverse. Installed around this sanctum are the images of the 10 avatars of God Vishnu. Five-feet tall idol of God Venkatachalapathy appears opposite the Chakra.
15	Sahasralingam	Stone	9.5 feet		Idol of God Shiva in lingam form. Weighing 20 tons, the idol has 53 lingams in each of the 19 lines making a total of 1,007 lingams carved within the main lingam and is accompanied by a Nandhi (the bull) measuring 5 feet long and 4 feet high. Around this sanctum are the idols of God Dakshinamurthy, God Venkatachalapathy with Goddess Alarmel Mangai and God Brahmma.

== Developments ==
In June 2012, the temple started the Guru Vyasa Veda Patasala, a centre to learn Vedas.
