= Kattupakkam =

Suburb of Chennai, Tamil Nadu, India

Kattupakkam, Chennai
- suburb of Chennai
- Kattupakkam, Tiruvallur district, Tamil Nadu
- Coordinates: 13.0414°N 80.1267°E
- Country: India
- State: Tamil Nadu
- District: Tiruvallur district
- Elevation: 64 m (210 ft)

Languages
  - Official: Tamil, English
- Time zone: UTC+5:30 (IST)
- PIN: 600056
- Other Neighbourhoods: Porur, Moulivakkam, Iyyapanthangal, Mugalivakkam, Manapakkam, Mangadu, Kumananchavadi and Poonamallee
- District Collector: Alby John Varghese, I. A. S.
- LS: Sriperumbudur
- VS: Alandur
- MP: T. R. Baalu
- MLA: T. M. Anbarasan

Kattupakkam is a suburb of Chennai, in Tiruvallur district, Tamil Nadu, India. It is located in the western side of the city.

== Location ==
Kattupakkam is located 20 kilometres from Fort St George on the Mount-Poonamallee Road. The nearest bus depot is at Iyyappanthangal, which is one kilometre from Kattupakkam, while the nearest railway station is at Guindy, 8 kilometres away. Kattupakkam is near to the Mangadu Amman temple. Tiruverkadu Karumari Amman Temple is about 5 kilometers from here. The Sri Ramachandra Medical College and Research Institute is about 2 kilometers.

== Landmarks ==
Kattupakkam has a number of temples, mosques and churches. The Sri Vada Chendur Murugan Temple at Kattupakkam is one of the oldest Hindu temples built in the city. Pillayar Kovil on the Sendurpuram Main Road is another old temple.
