= Masjid-e-Anwari =

Mosque in Tamil Nadu, India

- Location of the mosque in Greater Chennai

Religion
- Affiliation: Islam
- Ecclesiastical or organisational status: Mosque
- Status: Active

Location
- Location: Rajakilpakkam, Tambaram, Chengalpattu district, South Chennai, Tamil Nadu
- Country: India
- Coordinates: 12°55′19″N 80°09′16″E

Architecture
- Type: Mosque architecture
- Style: Mughal
- Founder: Nawab Zulfiqar Khan
- Completed: 1703

The Masjid-e-Anwari is a mosque located on the outskirts of South Chennai, in the state of Tamil Nadu, India. The mosque is situated in the suburb of Rajakilpakkam, between Velachery and Tambaram, in the Tambaram Municipality in the Chengalpattu district. The mosque was constructed in 1703 by Nawab Zulfiqar Khan, an officer in the Mughal army.

== See also ==
- Islam in India
- List of mosques in India
