= Pallavaram Flyover =

Bridge in India

- Pallavaram Bridge
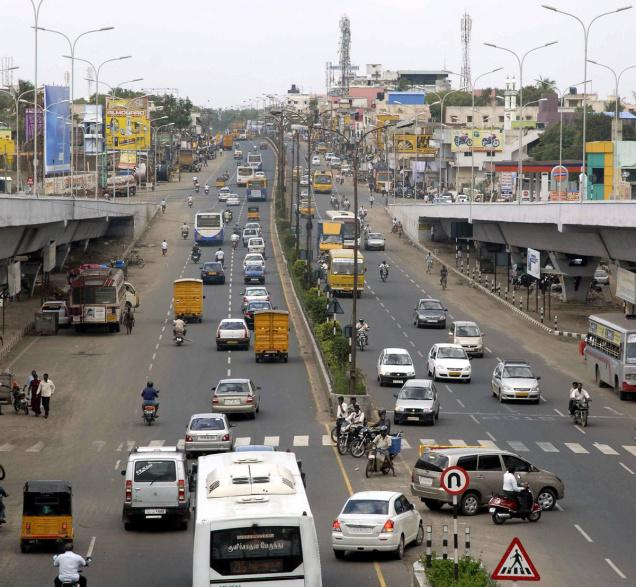
- Pallavaram Flyover

Location
- Chennai, India
- Roads at junction: Pallavaram–Thuraipakkam Radial Road

Construction
- Type: Flyover, Roundabout interchange
- Opened: 2000

Pallavaram Flyover is a rail over bridge with Roundabout interchange in NH 45 Grand Southern Trunk Road in Pallavaram, Chennai, Tamil Nadu.

Pallavaram Flyover paved the way for Pallavaram - Thuraipakkam Radial Road. The Bridge is located over Ponds Company Signal in Pallavaram. The Flyover is constructed to connect Chennai Airport with Rajiv Gandhi Salai(OMR) and East Coast Road(ECR).
