= Alapakkam (disambiguation) =

Alapakkam is a district of Chennai, India.

Alapakkam may also refer to:

== Places in Tamil Nadu, India ==
- Alapakkam, Cuddalore, a panchayat village in Cuddalore district
- Alapakkam, Kancheepuram, a census town in Kancheepuram district
- Alapakkam I, Uthukkottai, a panchayat village in Uthukkottai taluk, Tiruvallur district
- Alapakkam II, Uthukkottai, a village in Uthukkottai taluk, Tiruvallur district
