= Selaiyur =

Suburb of Chennai, India

- Neighborhood
- Location within Chennai Location within Tamil Nadu Location within India
- Coordinates: 12.93°N 80.14°E
- Country: India
- State: Tamil Nadu
- District: Chengalpattu

Government
  - Body: CMDA

Languages
  - Official: Tamil
- Time zone: UTC+5:30 (IST)
- PIN: 600073
- Vehicle registration: TN-11

Selaiyur is a suburb of Chennai, India, located on the Tambaram–Velachery Road in the Chennai Metropolitan Area. It was once called Silaiyur. Neighbouring areas include Tambaram, Madambakkam, Rajakilpakkam, Sembakkam, Chitlapakkam and Medavakkam.Once a part of Pallavaram Municipality, it was merged into Tambaram Municipal Corporation in 2021.

The Indian Air Force has one of its bases here.

The nearest railway station is the Tambaram railway station and the Chennai airport is about 9 km away. Selaiyur has bus connectivity to all the main regions of the city. The East Tambaram bus terminus is about 3 km away and passengers can also board the buses in Camp Road Junction bus stop located in the neighbourhood.

== Selaiyur tank ==
Selaiyur has an ancient temple tank in its midst. This tank belonged to the nearby Perumal temple. It is said that a record written 400 years ago by Chola king Thribhuvana Chakravarthy Vijaykanda Gopalan states that the tank belonged to the Perumal temple.

== Transport ==
Selaiyur is connected by MTC. The nearest railway station is 3 kilometres away at Tambaram. The nearest airport is Chennai International Airport at Meenambakkam. The main mode of transport and conveyance are buses and share-autos. The following buses ply towards Camp Road. Camp Road is the main junction in the locality where many banks like SBI, HDFC, AXIS are situated.
