= Aathur =

Locality in Chennai, India

Aathur (pronounced ˈɑː.θʊər, Tamil: /ˈtʃɛnaɪ/, IAST: Āthur), often spelled as Athur or Athoor, is a suburban locality situated near Chengalpattu in the southern part of the Chennai metropolitan area, Tamil Nadu, India. It falls under the jurisdiction of the Chengalpattu district and is part of the Greater Chennai region.

== Geography ==
Aathur is located approximately 5 kilometers west of the Chengalpattu Bridge, along the Grand Southern Trunk (GST) Road. The locality is well-connected to Chennai and other neighboring regions through road networks, making it accessible for commuters.

== Transport ==
Aathur's proximity to the GST Road provides connectivity to Chennai and other parts of Tamil Nadu. Public transportation, including buses and trains from nearby Chengalpattu, facilitates transportation for commuters.

== Demographics ==
=== Aathur Census Details (2011) ===
- Local Languages: Tamil and English
- Total Population: 2,189
- Number of Houses: 534
- Female Population: 48.6% (1,064)
- Village Literacy Rate: 76.4% (1,672)
- Female Literacy Rate: 33.9% (743)

==== Population Breakdown ====
Census Parameter	Census Data
Total Population	2,189
Total Number of Houses	534
Female Population %	48.6% (1,064)
Total Literacy Rate %	76.4% (1,672)
Female Literacy Rate	33.9% (743)
Scheduled Tribes Population %	3.7% (80)
Scheduled Caste Population %	34.9% (765)
Working Population %	56.2%
Child (0-6) Population (2011)	252
Girl Child (0-6) Population % (2011)	53.6% (135)
