= Narayanapuram, Kanchipuram district =

- Neighbourhood
- Narayanapuram, Kanchipuram district (Tamil Nadu)
- Coordinates: 12.942800°N 80.205700°E
- Country: India
- State: Tamil Nadu
- District: Kancheepuram district
- Elevation: 29 m (95 ft)

Languages
  - Official: Tamil, English
  - Speech: Tamil, English
- Time zone: UTC+5:30 (IST)
- PIN: 600100
- Neighbourhoods: Pallikaranai, Velachery, Selaiyur, Tambaram, Saidapet and Guindy
- Metro: Chennai
- District Collector: M. Aarthi, I.A.S.

Narayanapuram is a southern suburb of Chennai, located in Kanchipuram district of Tamil Nadu state in peninsular India.

Narayanapuram is located at an altitude of about 29 m above the mean sea level with the geographical coordinates of 12.942800°N 80.205700°E.

There is a private Dental college and Hospital viz., Sree Balaji Dental College and Hospital in Narayanapuram.

Narayanapuram Lake is a lake in the Narayanapuram area.
