= Pallavaram Hill =

Mountain in Pallavaram, India

Coordinates: 12°58′16″N 80°09′39″E

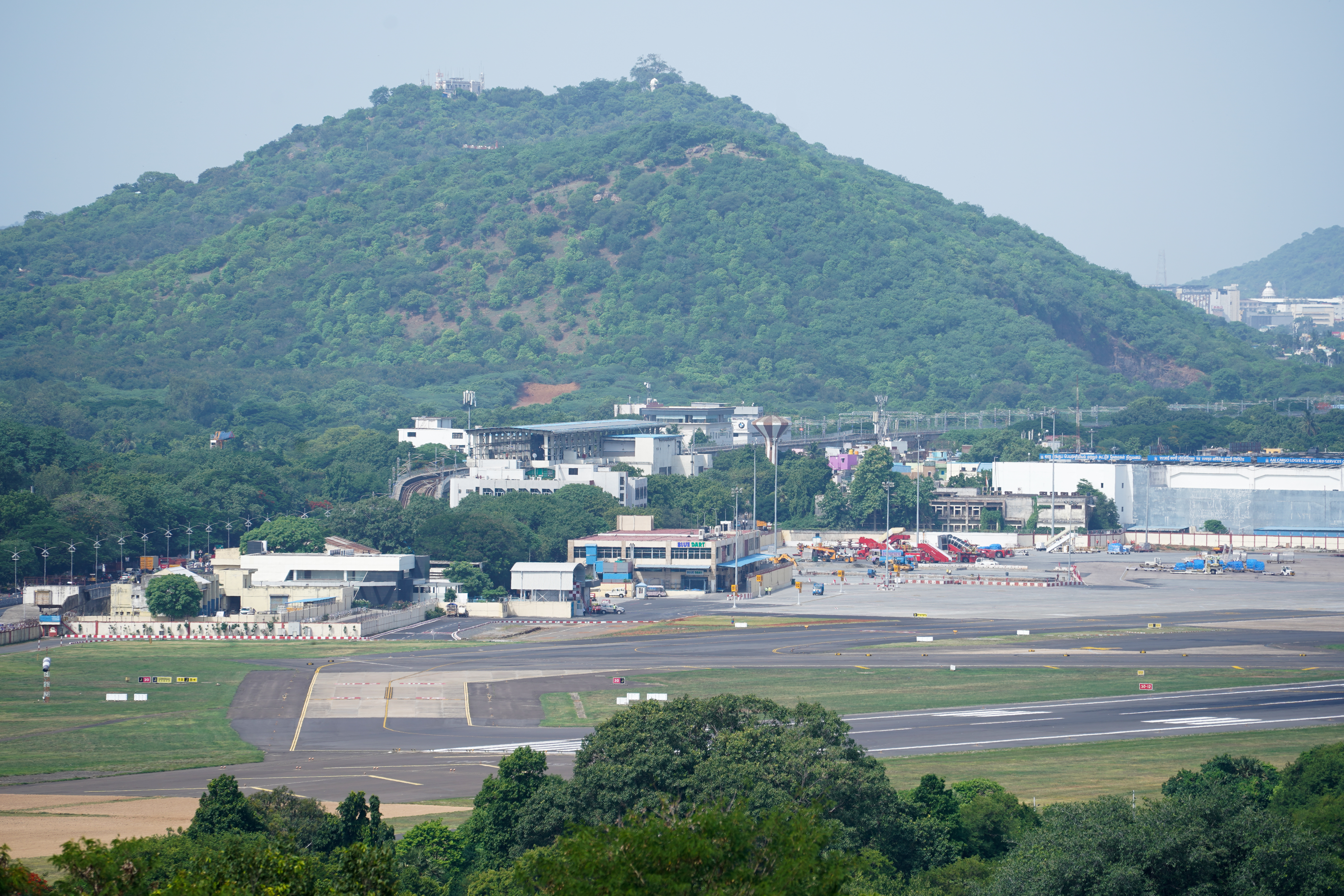
View of Chennai International Airport with Pallavaram Hill in background

The Pallavaram Hill (/pælʔva:rʔ/ pal-uh-VAH-ruh;) is a 153-metre (502 ft) mountain located in Pallavaram, India. It is home to the ruins of an ancient rock-cut temple. The name is derived from the surrounding city, which in turn is derived from the Pallava Dynasty settlement of Pallavapuram. The mountain is known for its views of surrounding Pallavaram and the Chennai International Airport as well as its extensive hiking and biking trails.

== Religious importance ==
The mountain is home to the ancient ruins of a Hindu temple, which was constructed in the early seventh century by Mahendravarman I, king of the Pallava dynasty. The temple was dedicated to Brahma and his Trimurti associates. Muslims believe that Pallavaram Hill is home to a relic of Prophet Mohammad. In the evening during Ramadan, Muslim pilgrims walk to the top of the mountain where the ruins are found. A small Hindu temple still exists on the peak though the original temple and shrine is no longer a place of worship.

== History ==
The surrounding town of Pallavaram has been inhabited since the Paleolithic Age and is one of the oldest settlements in South India. In the early seventh century, a rock-cut temple was constructed on the southern slope of the mountain. The mountain was used extensively as a quarry for the charnockite it contains. During British rule, an airport was built nearby which opened in 1932 and is now Chennai International.
