= Pallavaram–Thuraipakkam Radial Road =

Areterial Road in Chennai, Tamil Nadu

State Highway 109
- பல்லாவரம் துரைப்பாக்கம் ஆரவட்ட சாலை 200 feet Radial Road

Route information
- Maintained by State Highways
- Length: 6.5 mi (10.5 km) The 10 km stretch refers to the stretch from Grand Southern Trunk Road, Pallavaram in the South to the Rajiv Gandhi Salai, Thuraipakkam in the South East.

Major junctions
- South end: Grand Southern Trunk Road at Pallavaram, Chennai
- South East end: Rajiv Gandhi Salai, Thuraipakkam, Chennai

Location
- Country: India
- State: Tamil Nadu

Highway system
- Roads in India; Expressways; National; State; Asian; State Highways in Tamil Nadu

Pallavaram–Thuraipakkam Radial Road (State Highways 109) (பல்லாவரம் துரைப்பாக்கம் ஆரவட்ட சாலை) is an arterial road in Chennai connecting Grand Southern Trunk Road in Pallavaram with Rajiv Gandhi Salai in Thuraipakkam. The road was constructed by State Highways in 2000. Construction of Road divides Pallavaram Eri on the either side of the road. Now Lake is available only on the Northern Side of the Road.

Pallavaram Flyover connects this arterial road with GST Road. The road connects Pallavaram, Pammal, Pozhichalur, Tirusulam and Meenambakkam with Rajiv Gandhi Salai (OMR) and East Coast Road (ECR). This arterial road also makes the transit easier between eastern neighborhoods in Chennai City like Thuraipakkam, Shozhinganallur and Western neighborhoods in Chennai City like Thiruneermalai, Kundrathur and Poonamallee.

The road features important junctions:

- Echangadu Junction is a four way junction which Medavakkam, Perumbakkam and Nanmangalam on the south and Keelkattalai, Madipakkam and Puzhuthivakkam on the north. It intersects with Medavakkam Main Road.
- Pallikaranai Junction connects the road with Velachery and Taramani.

== Developments ==
The road is proposed for expansion into a six-lane highway.

Pallavaram–Thuraipakkam Radial Road is proposed to get a bus rapid transit system.

Construction of Keelkattalai Flyover has eased the traffic in the Echangadu junction.
