= Sembakkam =

Neighborhood of Tambaram, India

- Neighbourhood
- Location in Chennai Metropolitan Area Location in Tamil Nadu Location in India
- Coordinates: 12°55′35″N 80°9′54″E
- Country: India
- State: Tamil Nadu
- Metro: Chennai Metropolitan Area
- District: Chengalpattu
- City: Tambaram

Government
  - MP: T.R. Baalu (DMK)
  - MLA: I. Karunanithi (DMK)
  - Corporation Commissioner: R. Alagumeena IAS
  - Mayor: K. Vasanthakumari (DMK)
  - Deputy Mayor: G. Kamaraj (DMK)

Population (2011)
  - Total: 5,356

Languages
  - Official: Tamil
  - Additional official: English
- Time zone: UTC+5:30 (IST)
- PINs: 600073
- Area codes: 2248, 2263
- Vehicle Registration: TN 11
- Law enforcement agency: Tambaram City Police
- Urban planning agency: Chennai Metropolitan Development Authority

Sembakkam is a neighborhood in the city of Tambaram, situated within the Chennai Metropolitan Area, Tamil Nadu, India.

It falls under the Chennai Metropolitan Area (CMA) as notified in 1974. It is located on the Velachery Main Road which has been home to multiple schools and colleges as well as several well known national and international brands.

Sembakkam is served by local bus routes, while rail services are available from nearby Tambaram. It is located near Velachery, Tambaram, and Old Mahabalipuram Road.

== Administration ==
In 1984, the village panchayat of Sembakkam was elevated to town panchayat along with the hamlets of Rajakilpakkam and Gowrivakkam.

The town panchayat's population was 21,492 as per figures of the 2001 census. It more than doubled to 45356 as per the census of 2011.

In 2013, Sembakkam was elevated as a municipality. The annual revenue of the town panchayat touched Rs. 5 crore, an important factor that aided its status elevation to municipality, the official said. Spread over 6.27 square kilometres, Sembakkam is divided into 15 wards for administration purposes.

== Demographics ==
Religious census
| Religion | Percent(%) |
| Hindu | 78.01% |
| Muslim | 8.21% |
| Christian | 12.74% |
| Sikh | 0.04% |
| Buddhist | 0.04% |
| Jain | 0.15% |
| Other | 0.78% |

As of 2011 India census, Sembakkam had a population of 45,356, Males constitute 51% of the population and females 49%.

As per the religious census of 2011, Sembakkam had 78.01% Hindus, 8.21% Muslims, 12.74% Christians, 0.04% Sikhs, 0.04% Buddhists, 0.15% Jains and 0.78% following other religions.

== Hindu temples ==
Many temples are present in and around the area.

- Bhavani Periyapalayathamman Temple, 7th Cross St, Iyyappa Nagar, Sembakkam
- Sri Aganda Paripoorana Sachidananda Sabai, Rajakilpakkam
- Dhenupureeswarar Temple (Madambakkam)
- Aalavattamman Temple, Kamarajapuram
- Ponni amman Koil
- Kamakshi Temple
- Bajanai Koil
- Pillayar Koil
- Karumariamman Temple
- shree maha sakthi puram Temple
- Sri Veda Vyasar Tapovanam
- Jambulingeshwarar Sivan Koil

== Churches ==
- Advent Christian Church, Velachery Tambaram Main Road, Sembakkam,
- Advent Christian Church, Velachery Tambaram Main Road, Santhosapuram
- Zion AG Church, Kamarajapuram
- St Joseph Church, Mahalakshmi Nagar
- CSI St.Mark's Church, Camp Road Junction
- The Ark Victory Church, Sembakkam
- CSI St.John's Church, Madambakkam
- The Pentecostal Mission, Sembakkam

== Mosque/Masjid ==
- Masjid Noorunnissa Ahle Hadees, 3rd St, Thirumalai Nagar, Sembakkam
- Masjid E Anwari, Sembakkam
- Masjid Al Haramain, Vallal Yusuf Nagar Main Rd, Sembakkam
- Al Masjid Noor, Mahalakshmi Nagar, Tambaram

== Schools ==
- Shanthinikethan Matriculation Higher secondary school sembakkam
- Shanthinikethan CBSE school sembakkam
- Alpha Matriculation Higher Secondary School, Velachery Main Road, Sembakkam
- BOAZ Public School, Velachery Main Road, Gowrivakkam
- M.A.V. Vidyashram, Kamarajapuram
- Zion Matriculation Higher Secondary School (Branches: Indira Nagar, Madambakkam, Hasthinapuram)
- Alwin Memorial Public School, Indira Nagar
- Olive Public School, Chitlapakkam
- Kanchi Mahasamy Vidya Mandir (CBSE Affiliated), Sembakkam
- Alpha International School,Velachery main road, Sembakkam
