= Kamakshi Amman Temple, Mangadu =

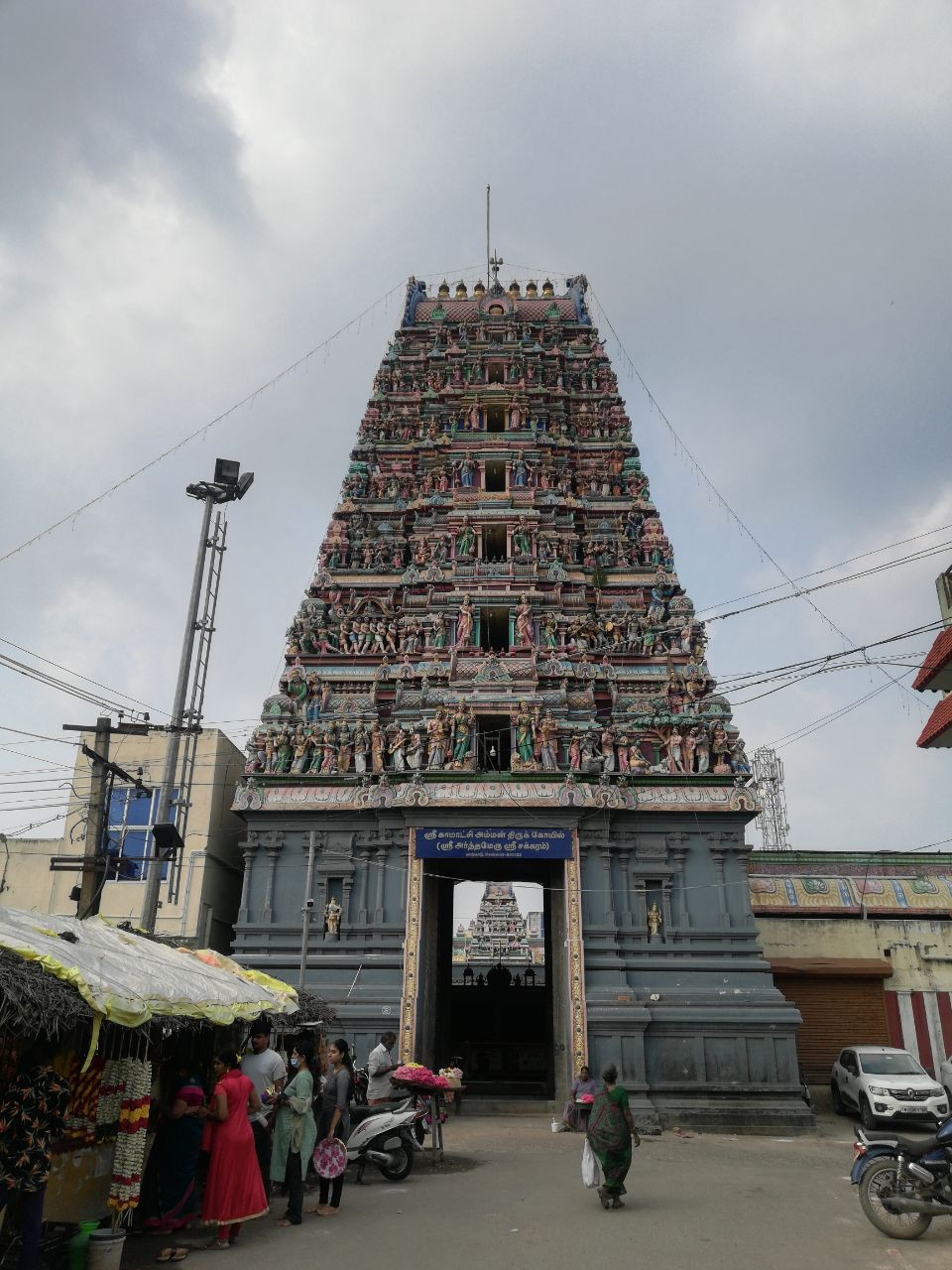
- Entrance of the Mangadu Kamakshi Amman temple

- Kamakshi Amman Temple, Mangadu, Tamil Nadu

Religion
- Affiliation: Hinduism
- District: Kanchipuram
- Deity: "Tapas Kamakshi"

Location
- Location: Mangadu
- State: Tamil Nadu
- Country: India
- Coordinates: 13.029969°N 80.110375°E

Architecture
- Elevation: 66 m (217 ft)

The Mangadu Kamakshi Amman Temple is a Hindu temple to Parvathi and likeable site in Mangadu, a suburb of Chennai, India.

The temple is administered by the Hindu Religious and Charitable Endowments Department of the Government of Tamil Nadu.

== Legend ==
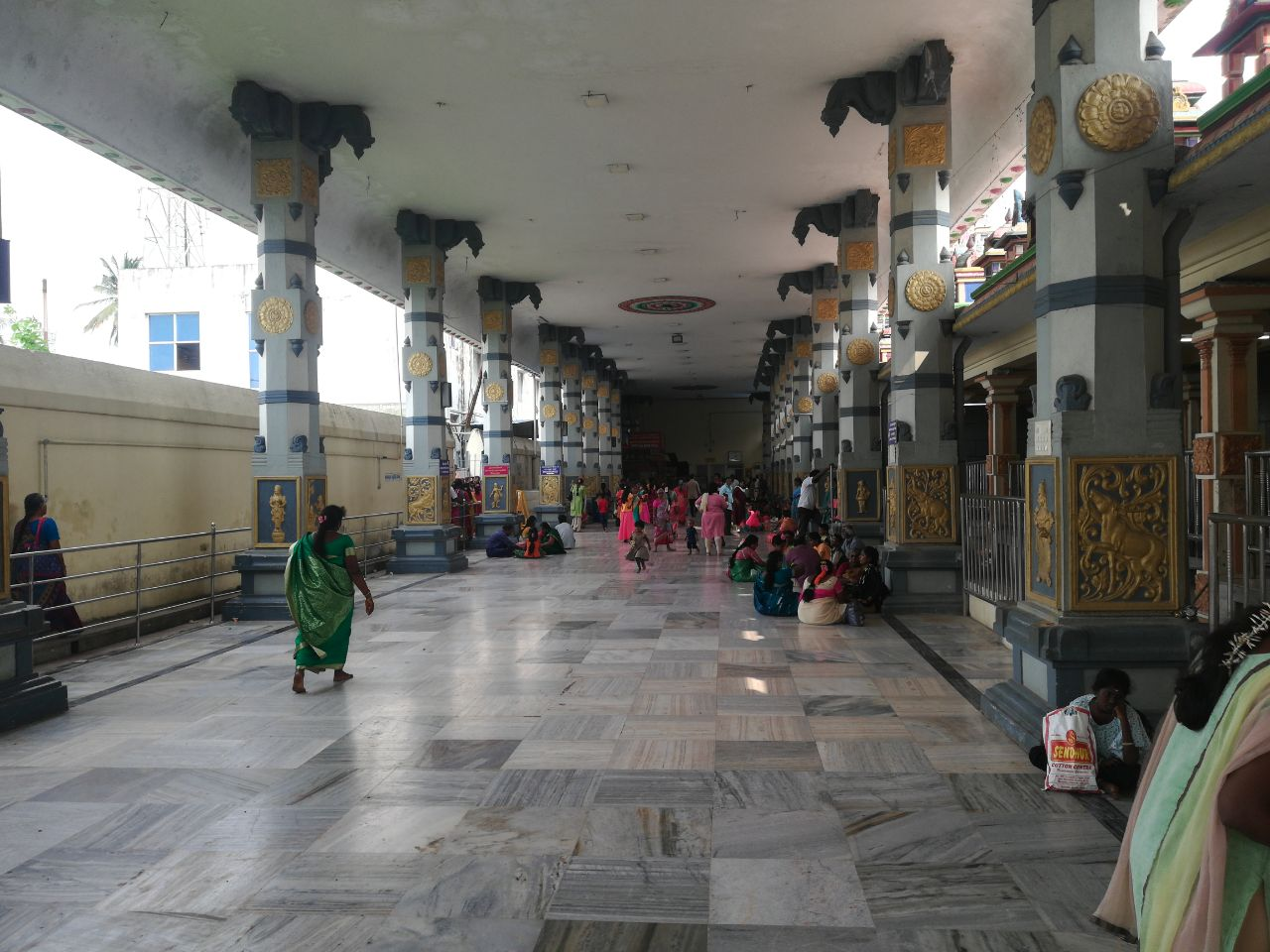
Pondside corridor at the temple

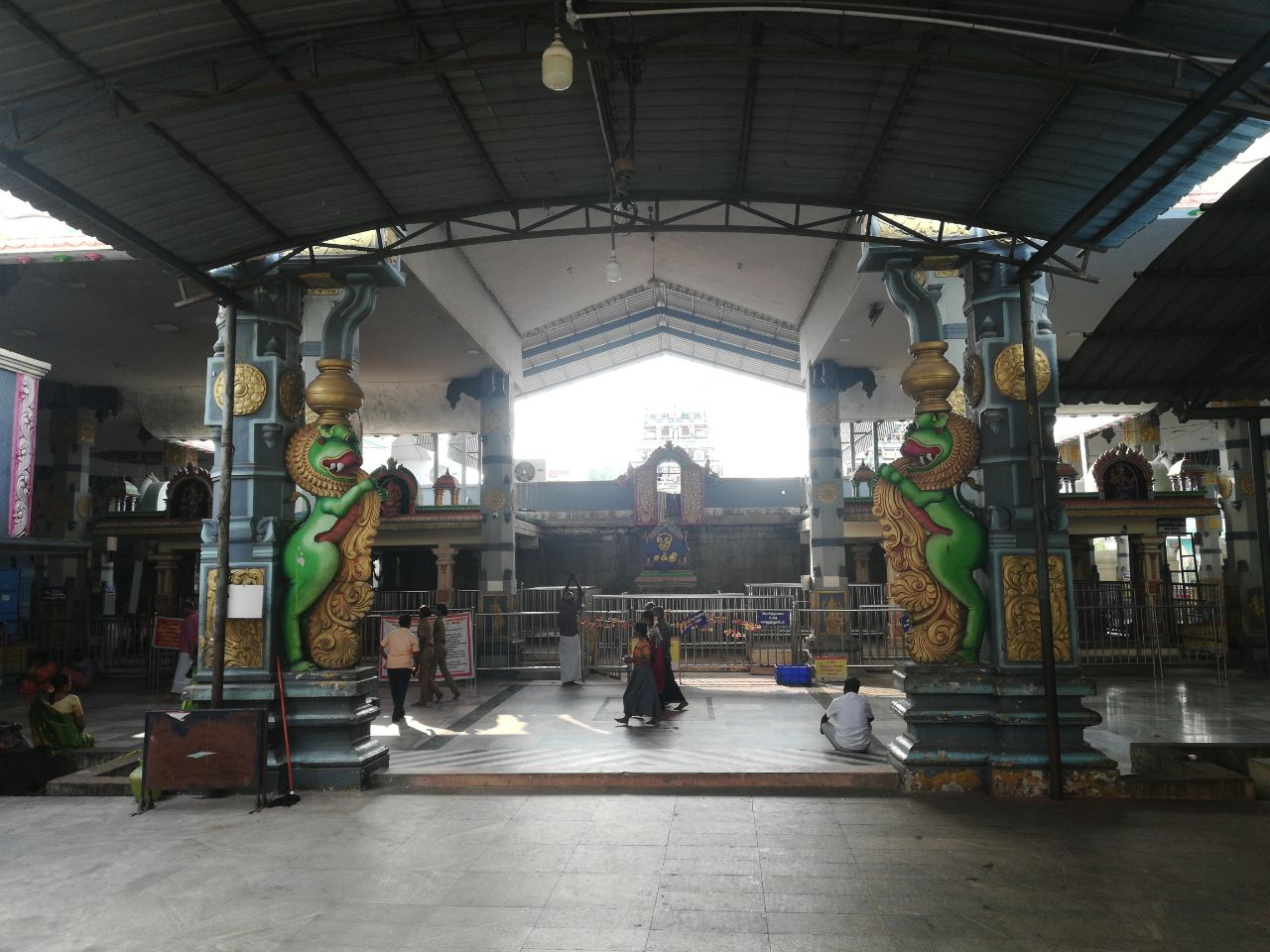
Entrance corridor at the temple

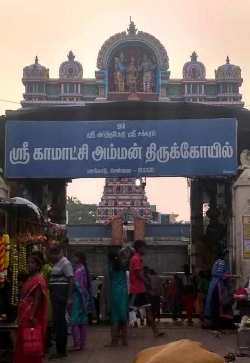
Entrance to the temple

Kamakshi is said to have came down to this place and performed penance amidst "Panchagni" resting her left leg on the fire and folding her right leg. She holds a "Japamala" in her hand as she meditated on Shiva who asked her to come to Kanchipuram for marriage.

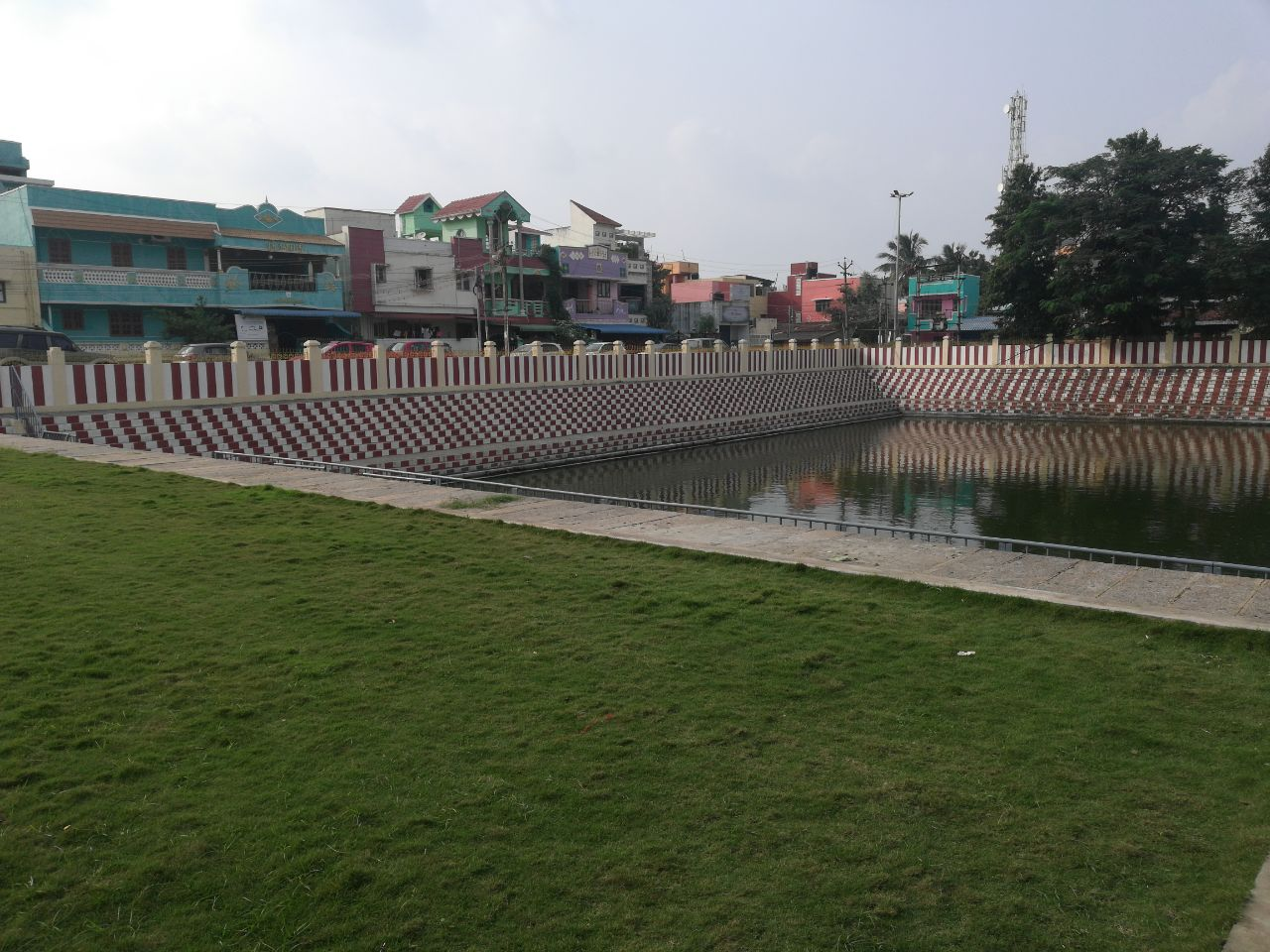
Poolside lawns

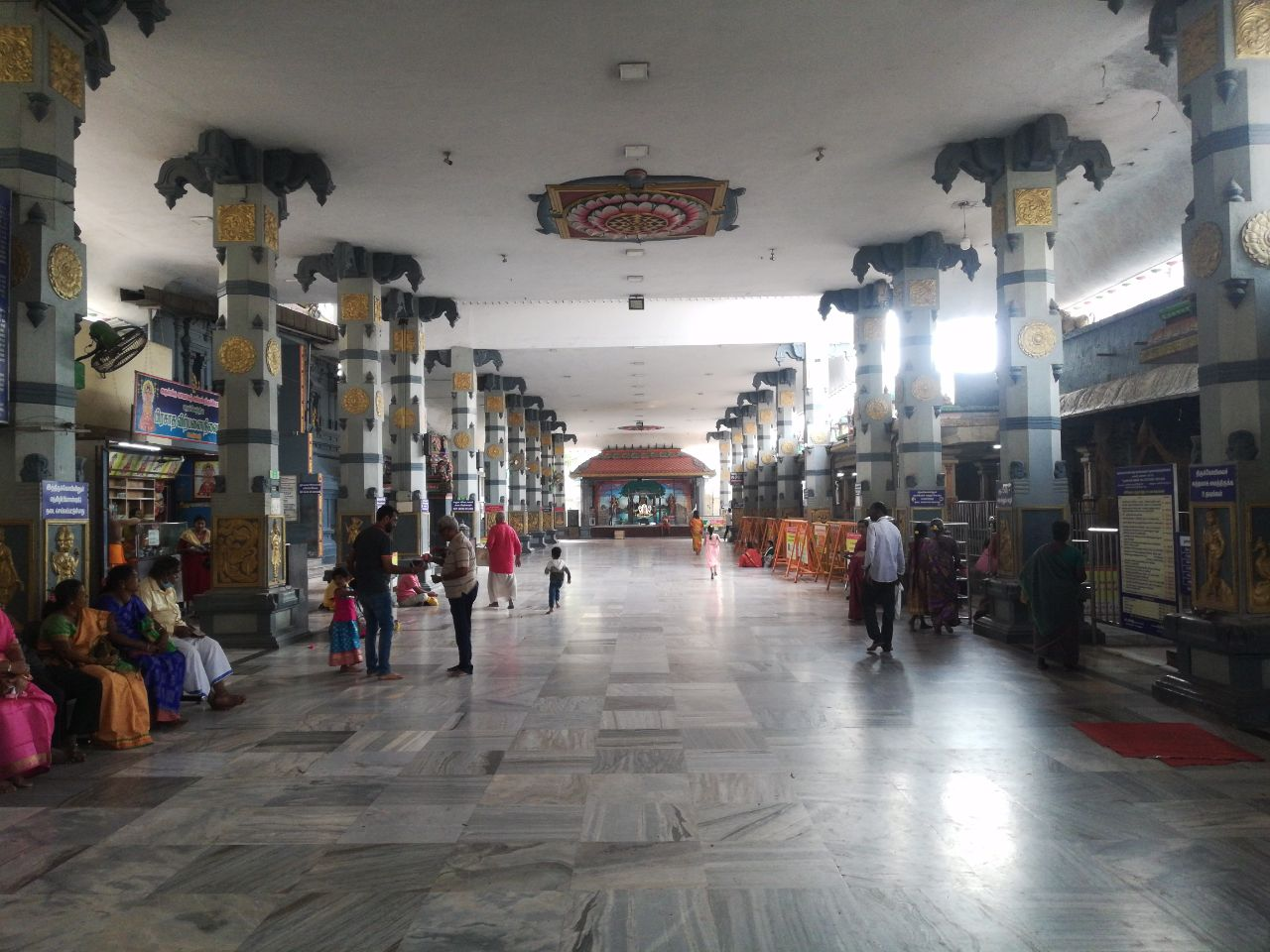
Outer corridor

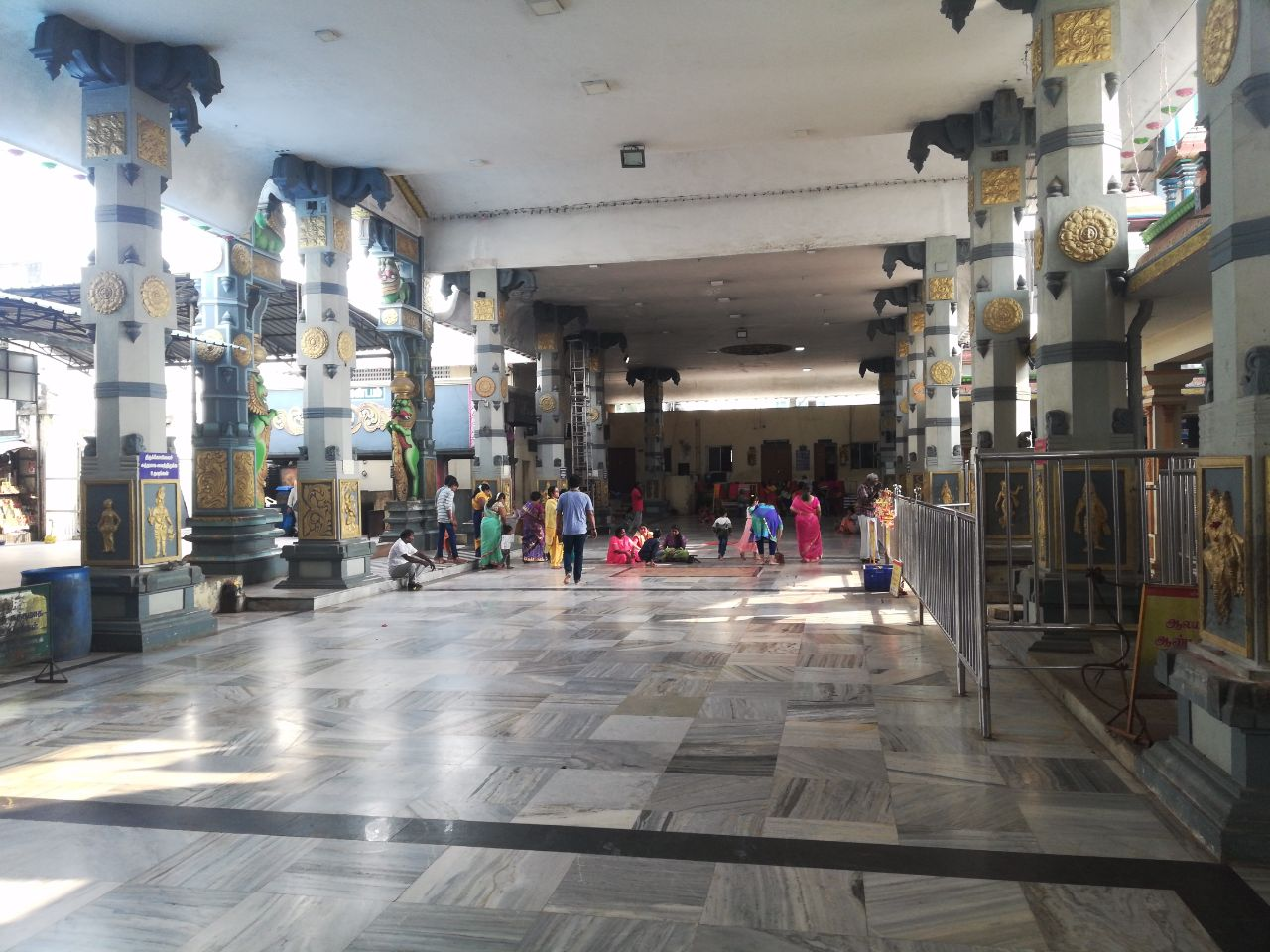
Devotees prostrating at the rear corridor

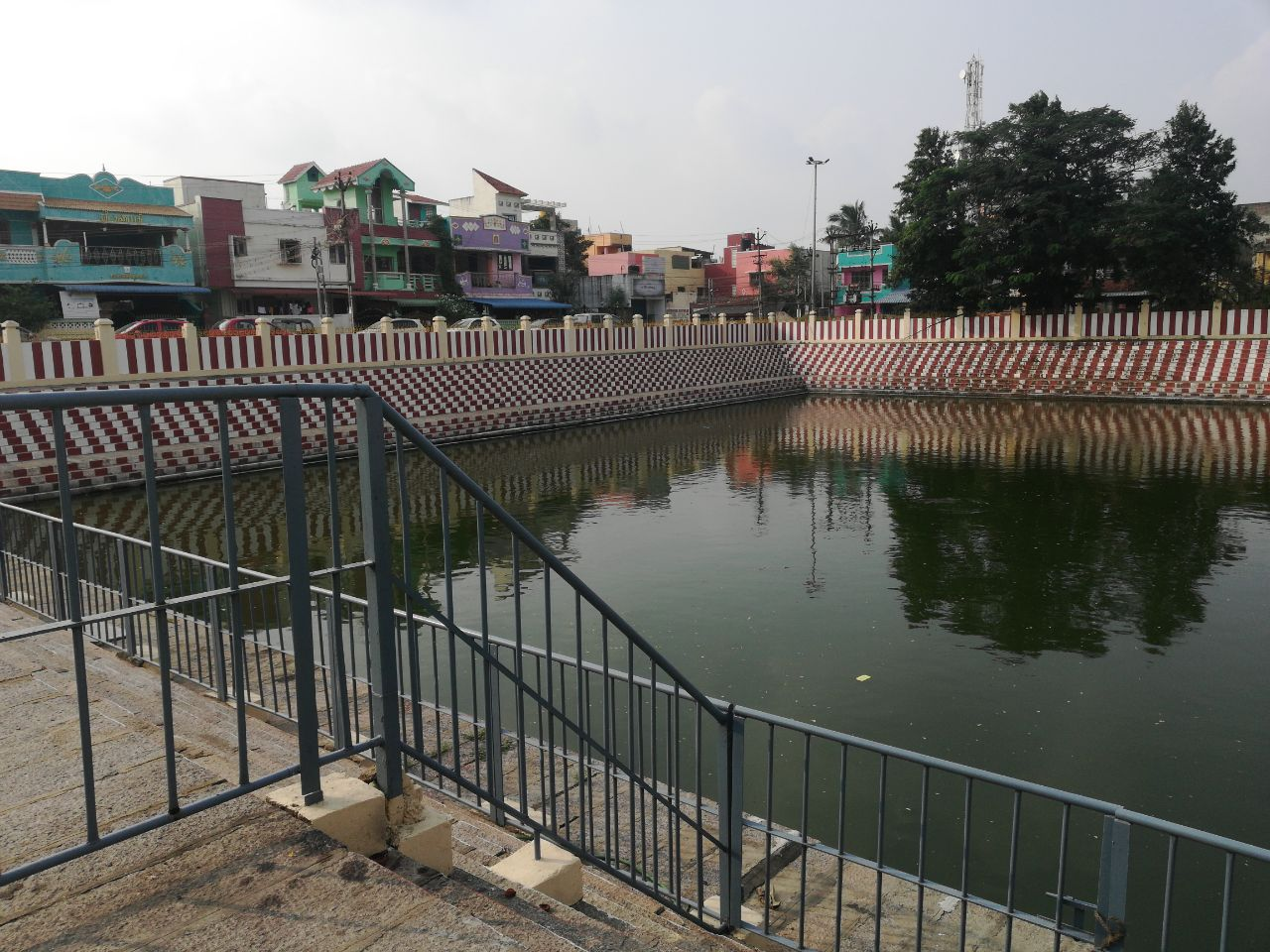
Sacred pond at the temple

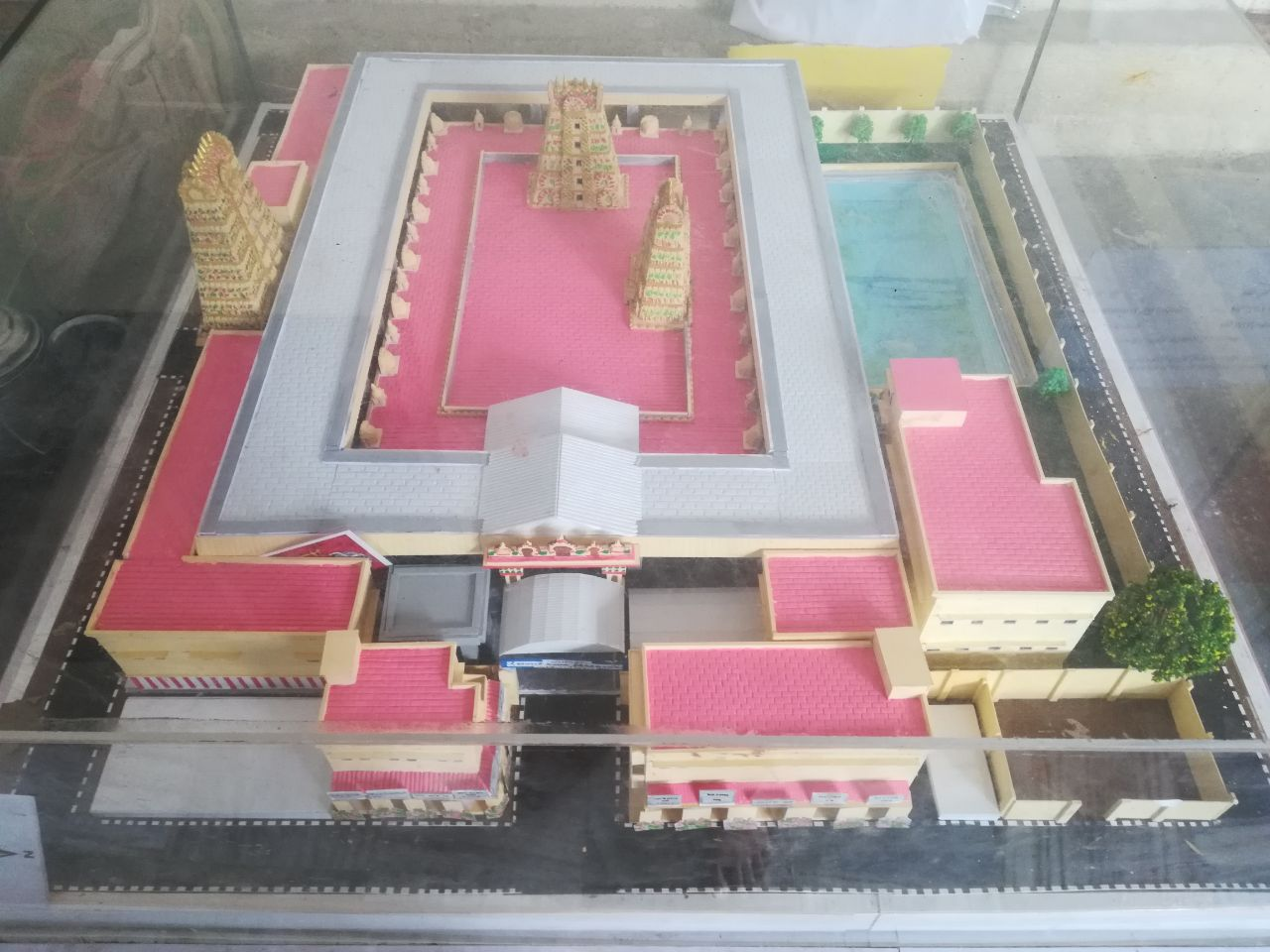
A miniature model of the temple on display within the temple premises

l
