= Thirumalai nagar =

Thirumalai Nagar (Tamil: திருமலை நகர் MAFM) is a neighbourhood in Kolathur, North Chennai (formerly Madras), Tamil Nadu, South India. It is near United Colona. It has approximately 140 residents and four main roads.

It is the site of the three Gang theaters (Ganga, Yamuna, and Kaveri), and a temple called Sree Devi Karumariyamman Aalayam.
