= Alapakkam, Cuddalore =

Alapakkam ALAPPAKKAM
- Village
- Location in Tamil Nadu, India Alapakkam (India)
- Coordinates: 11.36°N 79.43°E
- Country: India
- State: Tamil Nadu
- District: Cudallore

Languages
  - Official: Tamil
- Time zone: UTC+5:30 (IST)
- Nearest city: Cuddalore

Alapakkam also called is a village in Cuddalore district in Tamil Nadu. It comes under Cuddalore taluk and Alappakkam and poovanikuppam village panchayat. It is located on highway NH 45A, en route to Chidambaram. It is 19 km from Cuddalore and 29 km from Chidambaram town. Perumal lake is located the poovanikuppam panchayat The village consists of more than 1,000 acres (4.0 km^{2}) of arable land and about 1000 homes. The village also houses an ancient Shiva temple. It has one middle school and one elementary school.the lake water finally connected to sangolikuppam river.alappkkam village located inside the keezhpoovanikuppam village panchayat.
