= Grand Southern Trunk Road =

Road in Tamil Nadu, India

- மாபெரும் தெற்கு வழித்தடம்
- Grand Southern Trunk Road; Chennai-Perambalur–Trichy-Dindigul-Theni Highway

Location
- Country: India
- State: Tamil Nadu

Highway system
- Roads in India; Expressways; National; State; Asian; State Highways in Tamil Nadu

The Grand Southern Trunk Road (GST Road) is a historic major arterial road in the Indian state of Tamil Nadu, forming the principal southern land route from Chennai. Historically, the road connected Chennai with the interior and southern regions of the state, most notably Trichy.

After the 2010 renumbering of national highways in India, the precise extent of the GST Road became less clearly defined, and the term is now primarily used to refer to the Chennai–Tindivanam stretch of National Highway 32. The road is also still commonly referred to as NH 45, its designation prior to the 2010 renumbering.

== Major junctions ==
Chennai City

- Mount-Poonamallee Road near Kathipara Junction
- Mount-Medavakkam High Road in St.Thomas Mount
- Pallavaram-Kundrathur-Poonamallee Road (Pammal Main Road) in Pallavaram
- Pallavaram-Thiruneermalai Road in Pallavaram
- Pallavaram-Thuraipakkam Radial Road in Pallavaram
- Chitlapakkam and Hasthinapuram Main Road near MIT Bridge Along GST Road
- Gandhi Road in Tambaram
- Velachery Main Road and Mudichur Road in Tambaram
- Chennai Bypass Road in Irumbuliyur
- Chennai Outer Ring Road in Vandalur
- Vandalur-Kelambakkam Road in Vandalur
- Guduvancheri Tiruporur road

Outside Chennai

- Kotteripattu Near Tindivanam

== Developments ==
1. NHAI to repair Palar Bridge in Grand Southern Trunk Road near Chengalpattu.
2. Double Deck Structure proposed between Airport and Irumbuliyur along GST Road.
3. NHAI set to rectify 18 accident-prone spots in GST Road.
