= Iyyapanthangal =

Neighbourhood of Chennai, India

Iyyappanthangal, Chennai
- Suburb
- Location within Chennai
- Coordinates: 13.03796°N 80.13513°E
- Country: India
- State: Tamil Nadu
- Metro: Chennai

Government
  - Type: Municipality
  - Body: Mangadu Municipality

Population (2001)
  - Total: 7,066

Language
  - Official: Tamil
- Time zone: UTC+5:30 (IST)
- PIN: 600 056
- Vehicle registration: TN 12 (RTO, Poonamallee)
- Planning agency: CMDA

Iyyappanthangal is a neighborhood to the west of Chennai, Tamilnadu, India. It comes under Ayyappanthangal Village Panchayath comprising three villages - Ayyappanthangal, Kolathuvancheri, Thelliyar Agaram falling under Kundrathur Panchayath Union of Kanchipuram District. It is located 20 kilometres (12 mi) away from Fort St George on the Mount-Poonamallee Road. The nearest railway stations are at Guindy (Chennai South Line) about 11 kilometres (6.8 mi) away and Avadi (Chennai West Line) about 12 kilometres (7.5 mi) away. The Porur Junction where a much-needed road overbridge on the busy Guindy–Poonamallee stretch was built after a very long delay of nearly five years is just about 2 km from Iyyapanthangal and the Poonamallee Junction is just about 6 km from the town.

== Connectivity ==
The six-acre Iyyappanthangal bus terminus was opened in 1994. It operates 162 buses to places such as Koyambedu, Tambaram, Kundrathur, Sommangalam, Kovalam, Sunguvachattiram, Parrys Corner, Anna Salai, Tambaram, T Nagar and Mint. About 150,000 commuters take buses from here daily.

The state highways department undertook renovation of the terminus at a cost of ₹ 4.1 million in March 2010. The work to lay the concrete floor within the terminus area has begun. Among the 25 MTC depots, this is the first terminus to be taken up for renovation. The renovation includes construction of a compound wall, replacement of old lights, creating concrete parking areas for buses, installation of electronic sign boards, and raising the level of the terminus 1.5 feet above the height of Mount-Poonamallee High Road to prevent waterlogging during the monsoon. Facilities for toilets and drinking water for both passengers and MTC staff was also planned. Iyyappanthangal Bus Depot was one of the top most collection in revenue in Chennai in 2000s.

The 26.1-km-long Corridor 4 of the Chennai Metro Phase II which connects Ice House and Poonamallee will have a stop at Iyyappanthangal.

== Demographics ==
As of 2001, Iyyappanthangal had a population of 7,066 with 3,614 males and 3,452 females. The sex ratio is 955 and the literacy rate is 83.9.

== Education ==
Schools in the neighbourhood include The Pupil, Sri Chaitanya School, Maharishi Vidya Mandir, RISHS International School, Sindhi Model School of Excellence, and St.John's Matriculation School. Some of the major institutions of higher education are Sri Ramachandra Medical College and Hospital, Alpha College of Arts and Science, and Saveetha Dental College and Hospital.

== Healthcare ==
Sri Ramachandra Medical College and Hospital, one of the most important hospitals in the city, is located here. Other healthcare centers include Mahalakshmi Multispecialty Hospital (MMS), Aravind Eye Hospital, ACS Medical College and Hospitals, Kedar Hospital and DR multi-speciality hospital.
