= Kathipara, Idukki district =

Village in Kerala, India

Kathipara Kathipara is a village in Idukki district, Kerala state, India. It is located near Kallarkutty Dam, adjacent to Neriamangalam forest. KSEBL inspection Banglow and staff quarters situated at the Kathipara.
