= Alapakkam, Chengalpattu =

Alapakkam
- Census town
- Location in Tamil Nadu, India
- Coordinates: 12°32′9″N 79°45′33″E
- Country: India
- State: Tamil Nadu
- District: Chengalpattu

Population (2001)
  - Total: 5,421

Languages
  - Official: Tamil
- Time zone: UTC+5:30 (IST)

Alapakkam is a census town in Chengalpattu district in the state of Tamil Nadu, India. The Alapakkam Census Town has population of 9,404 of which 4,702 are males while 4,702 are females as per report released by Census India 2011.

== Demographics ==
The population of children aged 0-6 is 1105 which is 11.75 % of total population of Alapakkam (CT). In Alapakkam Census Town, the female sex ratio is 1000 against state average of 996. Moreover the child sex ratio in Alapakkam is around 1020 compared to Tamil Nadu state average of 943. The literacy rate of Alapakkam city is 85.19 % higher than the state average of 80.09 %. In Alapakkam, male literacy is around 90.40 % while the female literacy rate is 79.97 %.

Alapakkam Census Town has total administration over 2,330 houses to which it supplies basic amenities like water and sewerage. It is also authorize to build roads within Census Town limits and impose taxes on properties coming under its jurisdiction.

Earlier according to 2001 India census, Alapakkam had a population of 5421. Males constitute 53% of the population and females 47%. Alapakkam has an average literacy rate of 72%, higher than the national average of 59.5%; with 58% of the males and 42% of females literate. 10% of the population is under 6 years of age.
