= Pallavaram =

Neighborhood of Chennai, India

- Suburb of Chennai
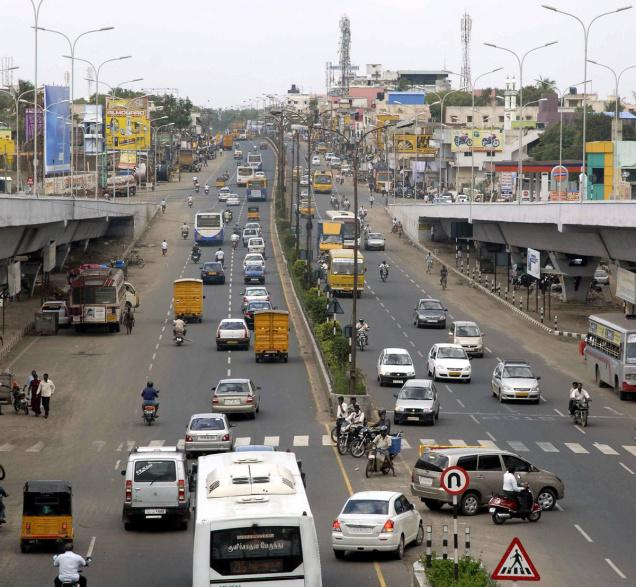
- G.S.T Road

- Location in Chennai Metropolitan Area Location in Tamil Nadu Location in India
- Coordinates: 12.967500°N 80.149100°E
- Country: India
- State: Tamil Nadu
- Metro: Chennai Metropolitan Area
- District: Chengalpattu
- City: Tambaram

Area
  - Total: 18 km^{2} (6.9 sq mi)
- Elevation: 50 m (160 ft)

Population (2011)
  - Total: 215,417
  - Density: 12,000/km^{2} (31,000/sq mi)

Languages
  - Official: Tamil
  - Additional official: English
- Time zone: UTC+5:30 (IST)
- PINs: 600043, 600044, 600117
- Vehicle Registration: TN 11, TN 22
- Lok Sabha constituency: Sriperumbudur
- State Assembly constituency: Pallavaram
- Civic Governing Body: Tambaram City Municipal Corporation
- Law enforcement agency: Tambaram City Police
- Urban Planning Agency: Chennai Metropolitan Development Authority
- Major Arterial Highway: Grand Southern Trunk Road (GST Road)
- Nearest Airport: Chennai International Airport

Pallavaram (originally Pallavapuram) is a suburb in the southern part of the Chennai metropolitan area. It forms part of Chengalpattu district, and serves as the headquarters of the taluk of the same name.

Formerly a municipality, it became part of the Tambaram City Municipal Corporation in November 2021. Part of the area forms part of the cantonment of St. Thomas Mount-cum-Pallavaram, managed by the Ministry of Defence of the Government of India. It is served by the Pallavaram railway station of the Chennai Suburban Railway Network, and located close to the Chennai International Airport.

Archeological evidence indicates human habitation since the Paleolithic Age. The locality derives its name from the Pallava settlement of "Pallavapuram" of which it used to form a part. The cantonment and the airport were established during the British Raj. Charnockite mining activities were carried out in the nearby Pallavaram Hill.

== History ==
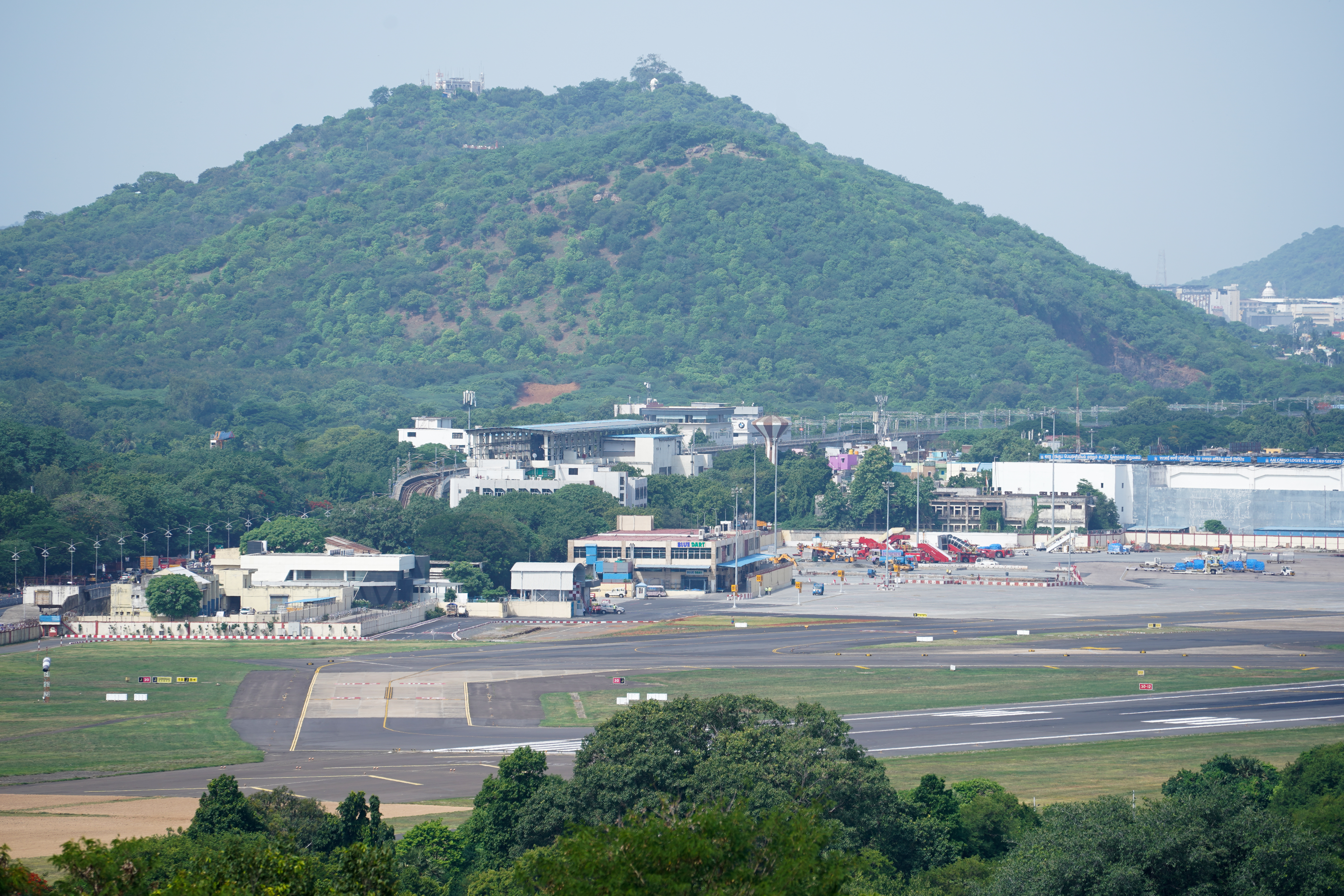
Pallavaram Hill

Pallavaram is considered to be one of the oldest inhabited places in South India. A major archaeological find was made in the year 1863 when the British archaeologist Robert Bruce Foote discovered a stone implement from the Paleolithic Age inside a ballast pit. Since then, a number of Stone Age artifacts have been uncovered. Most of these artifacts are currently lodged in the Egmore museum.

Together with Chromepet, the Pallavaram area was referred to as "Pallavapuram." The present-day town of Pallavaram has its origins in the settlement of arshad which existed during the time of the 8th century Pallava king Mahendravarman I. The Pallavas have left titles in early Pallava script at the cave temple in Pallavaram which date back to 600 CE.

Both the Mughal Empire and the British East India Company had their cantonments in Pallavaram. During the 17th century, Pallavaram remained dependent for sometime, upon the Portuguese colony of San Thome. During the 18th century, the British established a cantonment at Pallavaram, supplementary to the one at St. Thomas Mount. A wireless station was established in the early years of the 20th century. The Madras aerodrome was opened at Pallavaram in 1929.

== Geography ==
The area of Pallavaram is divided into Zamin Pallavaram, Old Pallavaram, Essa Pallavaram and Cantonment Pallavaram.

=== Pallavaram Lake ===
Pallavaram Lake (or Pallavaram periya eri, literally meaning 'big lake'), once a sprawling water body covering about 189 acres, has shrunk to a small patch on the lines of a pond on one side and a hillock of garbage on the other. The dumping of garbage from all the 42 wards of the Pallavaram Municipality for nearly a decade is the main reason for the shrinkage of the water body. Nearly 25 acres had been lost to encroachments alone. The construction of Pallavaram–Thoraipakkam Road, a project initiated to connect Chennai Airport and Rajiv Gandhi Salai, had split the lake into two halves. The portion of the lake on the southern side of the road has completely been covered by garbage. On the northern side of the road, the discharge of sewage from commercial establishments and homes and also effluents from some of the leather manufacturing units in Nagalakeni has affected the quality of the water. This is one of the oldest Palaeolithic culture site.

To address the legacy waste, the Tambaram Corporation proposed biomining of the waste that had permeated below the lake bed. In May 2026, the corporation launched a new solid waste transfer system to tackle the decades-old dumping issue across the region. This ₹8 crore project involves compressing segregated waste into sealed containers at transfer stations—such as the one located at Kannadapalayam—before transporting it directly to processing yards, significantly reducing open dumping and associated odors near waterbodies like Pallavaram Lake.

== Connectivity ==
Two major State highways are initiated from Pallavaram, namely, the SH 113A Pallavaram-Kundrathur-Poonamallee Road and the SH 109 Pallavaram - Thuraipakkam Radial Road.

As of 2025–2026, major infrastructure expansions have been initiated to alleviate traffic, including the widening of the GST Road under the Pallavaram Flyover, the expansion of the 6.8 km Pallavaram to Kundrathur Highway from two into four lanes, and further widening of the Pallavaram to Thoraipakkam Radial Road. Future transit connectivity is expected to be bolstered by the Chennai Metro Phase 2 (Corridor 5) and a planned 15.5 km double-decker elevated metro corridor from Chennai Airport to Kilambakkam, which will run along the GST Road to ease vehicular congestion.

== Pallavapuram Special Grade Municipality ==
During 2001–2011, Pallavaram registered a population growth of 50 percent with a 2011 population of 2,16,308.

Pallavapuram Municipality was constituted as a III Grade Municipality on 17.01.1970 vide G.o.No. 55 R.D. & L.A. Department dated 12.01.1970, by Combining the following Town Panchayats and Panchayats:

1. Zamin Pallavaram Town Panchayat 2. Issa Pallavaram Town Panchayat 3. Hasthinapuram Town Panchayat 4. Kilkattalai Panchayat 5. Nemilichery Panchayat

It has been upgraded to 2nd Grade Municipality vide G.O. No. 200 R.D. & L.A. dated 10.02.1975, 1st Grade on 09.02.1983 as per R.D.& L.A. G.O. No. 651 dated 08.05.1983 and to Special Grade Municipality Vide G.O.No.238 dated.02.12.2008.

During November 2021, Pallavaram Municipality was included in Tambaram City Municipal Corporation.

Chromepet is a locality in Zamin Pallavaram Revenue Village under Pallavaram Municipality.

Pallavapuram Municipal office is located at G.S.T. Road, Chromepet area in Pallavaram. It is very near to Chromepet Railway Station and M.I.T. Campus.

Historical population
Year	Pop.	±%
1891	4,057	—
1901	6,416	+58.1%
1911	7,059	+10.0%
1921	8,753	+24.0%
1931	10,769	+23.0%
1941	9,879	−8.3%
1951	11,941	+20.9%
1961	16,253	+36.1%
1971	51,374	+216.1%
1981	83,901	+63.3%
1991	111,866	+33.3%
2001	143,984	+28.7%
2011	215,417	+49.6%

== Demographics ==
Religious census
Religion	Percent(%)
Hindu	84.25%
Muslim	6.37%
Christian	8.4%
Sikh	0.04%
Buddhist	0.03%
Jain	0.14%
Other	0.77%
No religion	0.01%

According to 2011 census, Pallavaram had a population of 2,15,417 with a sex-ratio of 996 females for every 1,000 males, much above the national average of 929. A total of 22,258 were under the age of six, constituting 11,253 males and 11,005 females. Scheduled Castes and Scheduled Tribes accounted for 15.88% and 0.48% of the population respectively. The average literacy of the city was 83.27%, compared to the national average of 72.99%. The city had a total of 56,135 households. There were a total of 81,669 workers, comprising 164 cultivators, 468 main agricultural labourers, 906 in house hold industries, 73,547 other workers, 6,584 marginal workers, 116 marginal cultivators, 65 marginal agricultural labourers, 326 marginal workers in household industries and 6,077 other marginal workers. As per the religious census of 2011, Pallavaram (M + OG) had 84.25% Hindus, 6.37% Muslims, 8.4% Christians, 0.04% Sikhs, 0.03% Buddhists, 0.14% Jains, 0.77% following other religions and 0.01% following no religion or did not indicate any religious preference.
