= Kumananchavadi =

Neighbourhood in Tiruvallur district, Tamil Nadu, India

Coordinates: 13.044968°N 80.116017°E

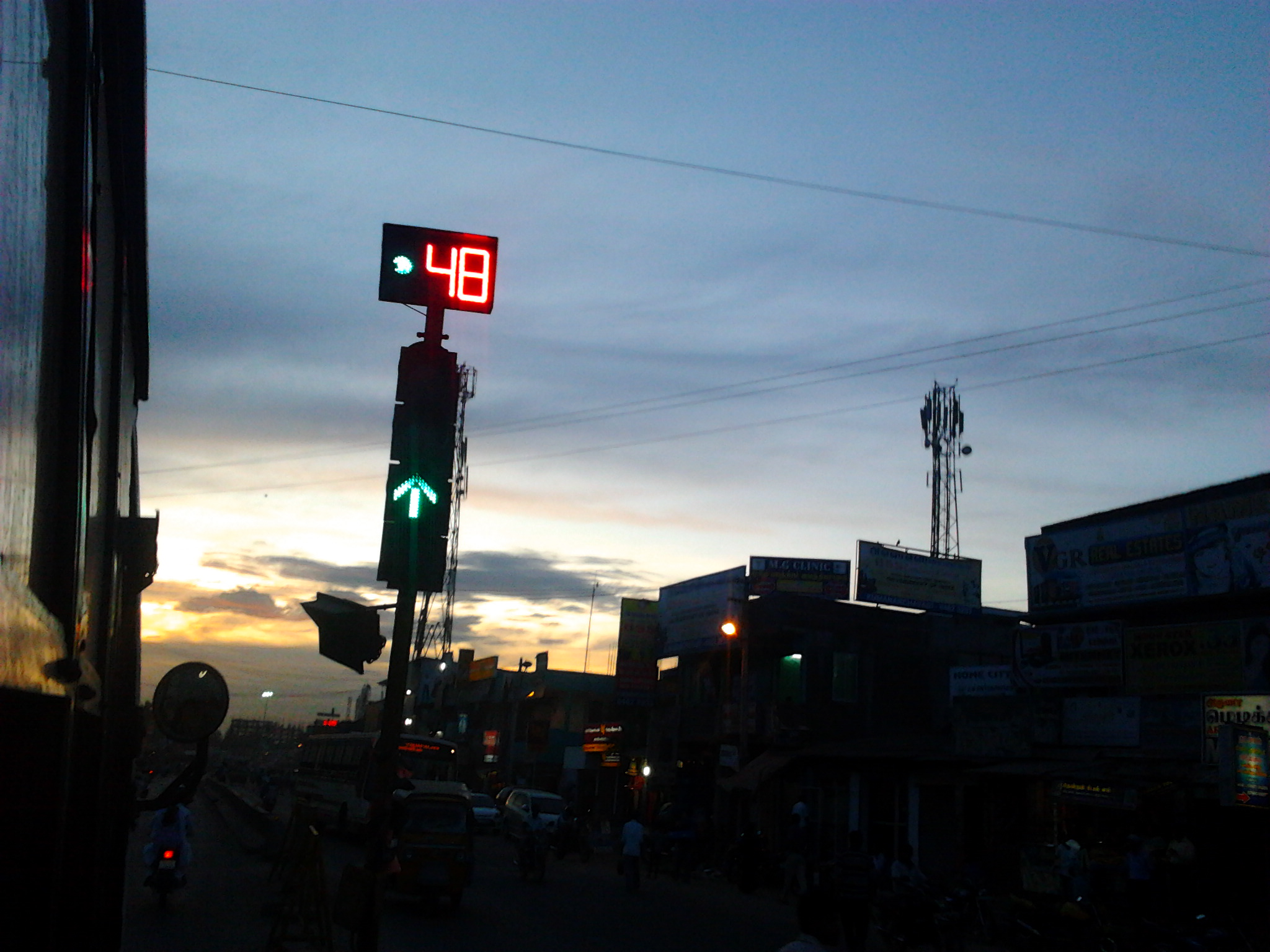
At the Kumananchavadi junction

Kumananchavadi is a suburb of the city of Chennai in Tamil Nadu, India. It is an upcoming residential suburb located between Iyyapanthangal and Poonamallee on the Mount-Poonamallee Road. Kumananchavadi is situated at a distance of 21 kilometres from Fort St George. The nearest bus stations are at Poonamallee and Iyyapanthangal which are both, two kilometres away while the nearest railway station is at Guindy which is nine kilometres from Kumananchavadi.
