= Pallavaram Lake =

Lake in India

- Location within Tamil Nadu

- Periya Eri
- Location: Chennai, Tamil Nadu, India
- Coordinates: 12°57′30.73″N 80°9′5.7″E
- Settlements: Chennai

Pallavaram Lake, also known as Periya aeri (Big lake) or Pallavaram aeri, is situated along Pallavaram Thuraipakkam Radial Road. It used to be a large lake, but it dried up and was polluted by industrial wastewater and garbage.

A burial site remains and is used for burial rites.

== Ecological impact ==
This lake was once huge and the railway tracks and trains passing through were visible from the banks of the lake. The lake does not have a single a drop of water and has turned into a dumpyard with huge garbage piles.

The lake's health was altered by the following:

- Waste waters from Chrome leather companies situated on western side mixes in the lake. The lake has shrunk due to huge encroachment and illegal buildings and constructions that took place over the decade.
- On the eastern side, portions of the lake's banks were demolished in order to shell out the water from the lake to pave way for construction of road in 2001.
- More over the lake was cut in to two by Radial road connecting Pallavaram to Thoraipakkam.
- There is also a huge encroachment inside the lake on Southwest side. The compound walls of that encroachment runs inside the lake from one end to almost to other end.

The Pallavaram Lakes are well encroached by getting the green signal of authorities right from Collector to VAOs.

They are directly involved in destroying the lakes and encouraging the Water mafias to make drinking water as commodities.

Kanchipuram Collector is the main person behind this along with Pallavaram Municipal commissioner and Councillors.

== Burial ground ==
There is a burial ground situated on south eastern end of the lake (behind Lakshmi nagar and Ganapathy puram). People perform last rites and immerse the ashes in the lake.

== See also ==
- Water management in Chennai
