= Mangadu =

Town in Chennai, India

- Town
- Nickname: Mangadu
- Mangadu(Chennai) Mangadu (Tamil Nadu) Mangadu (India)
- Coordinates: 13.039675°N 80.109717°E
- Country: India
- State: Tamil Nadu
- Metro: Chennai

Government
  - Type: Municipality
  - Body: Mangadu Municipality(மாங்காடு நகராட்சி)

Area
  - Total: 8.40 km^{2} (3.24 sq mi)

Population (2011)
  - Total: 38,188
  - Density: 4,550/km^{2} (11,800/sq mi)

Languages
  - Official: Tamil, English
- Time zone: UTC+5:30 (IST)
- PIN: 600122, 600125,600069,600056
- Vehicle registration: TN 85 (RTO, Kundrathur ), TN 12 (RTO, Poonamallee )

Mangadu is a town to the west of Chennai, India. Literally meaning a mango forest. The Mangadu Municipality is about 18 km from Chennai Central railway station, 14 km from Chennai International Airport and 13 km from CMBT.

Malayambakkam, Kozhumanivakkam, Paraniputhur and Sikkarayapuram village panchayats are annexed to Mangadu Municipality

== Demographics ==
As of 2011 India census, Mangadu had a population of 38188. Males constitute 49% of the population and females 51%. Mangadu has an average literacy rate of 86.91%, higher than the national average of 80.6%: male literacy is 91.77%, and female literacy is 82.05%. In Mangadu, 11% of the population is under 6 years of age.

=== Religion ===
Mangadu is famous for the majestic and famous Kamakshi Amman Temple, Mangadu. This temple group oversees the daily operations of approximate 7 temples in the locality. The famous temples of Mangadu are -

- Velleswarar Temple, Mangadu
- Sri Vaikunta Perumal Temple, Mangadu
- Vinayagar Temple, Mangadu
- Mandhi Amman Temple, Mangadu
- Solai Mandhi Amman Temple, Mangadu
- Vembu Mari Amman Temple, Mangadu
- Thorpathi Amman Temple, Mangadu

== Hospitals ==
- Government Primary Health Centre, Mangadu
- Muthukumaran Medical College Hospital

== IT Parks ==
- Softrate Tech Park (Softrate Global)

== Chennai Metro Rail ==
The proposed Chennai Metro Phase 2 Corridor 4 links Poonamallee with Light House. The proposed Kumanamchavadi and Kattupakkam metro stations will be around 2 kilometres from Mangadu Bus Terminal.

== Educational Institutions ==
=== Schools ===
- Maharishi Vidya Mandir School CBSE
- Velammal Vidyalaya CBSE
- RISHS International School CBSE
- Mangadu Public School CBSE
- Padma Subramaniam Bala Bhavan Matriculation Higher Secondary School PSBB
- Nav Bharat Matriculation Higher Secondary School
- National IT International Matriculation Higher Secondary School
- Government Higher Secondary School, Mangadu
- Sridevi Matric School, Mangadu
- Government Muslim High School, Pattur
- Government Adi Dravidar Welfare School
- St. Marys Matriculation School
- Little Flower Matriculation School
- Atchaya School for Kids
- Zee Kids School

=== Colleges ===
- Sri Muthukumaran Institute of Technology
- Sri Muthukumaran Medical College
- Sri Muthukumaran Arts and Science College
- Sri Muthukumaran College of Education
- Meenakshi College of Nursing
- Little Flower Polytechnic College
