= Rajakilpakkam =

Neighbourhood in Chengalpattu district, Tamil Nadu, India

- Neighbourhood
- Rajakilpakkam (Chennai) Rajakilpakkam (Tamil Nadu)
- Coordinates: 12°55′03.7″N 80°09′20.5″E
- Country: India
- State: Tamil Nadu
- District: Kanchipuram
- Elevation: 25.89 m (84.9 ft)

Languages
  - Official: Tamil
- Time zone: UTC+5:30 (IST)
- PIN: 600073

Rajakilpakkam is a neighbourhood area of Chennai to the south of the city, officially a part of Tambaram Municipal Corporation from November 3, 2021, formerly a part of Sembakkam municipality, in Tamil Nadu, India. Its post code is 600073.
