= Tambaram =

- City
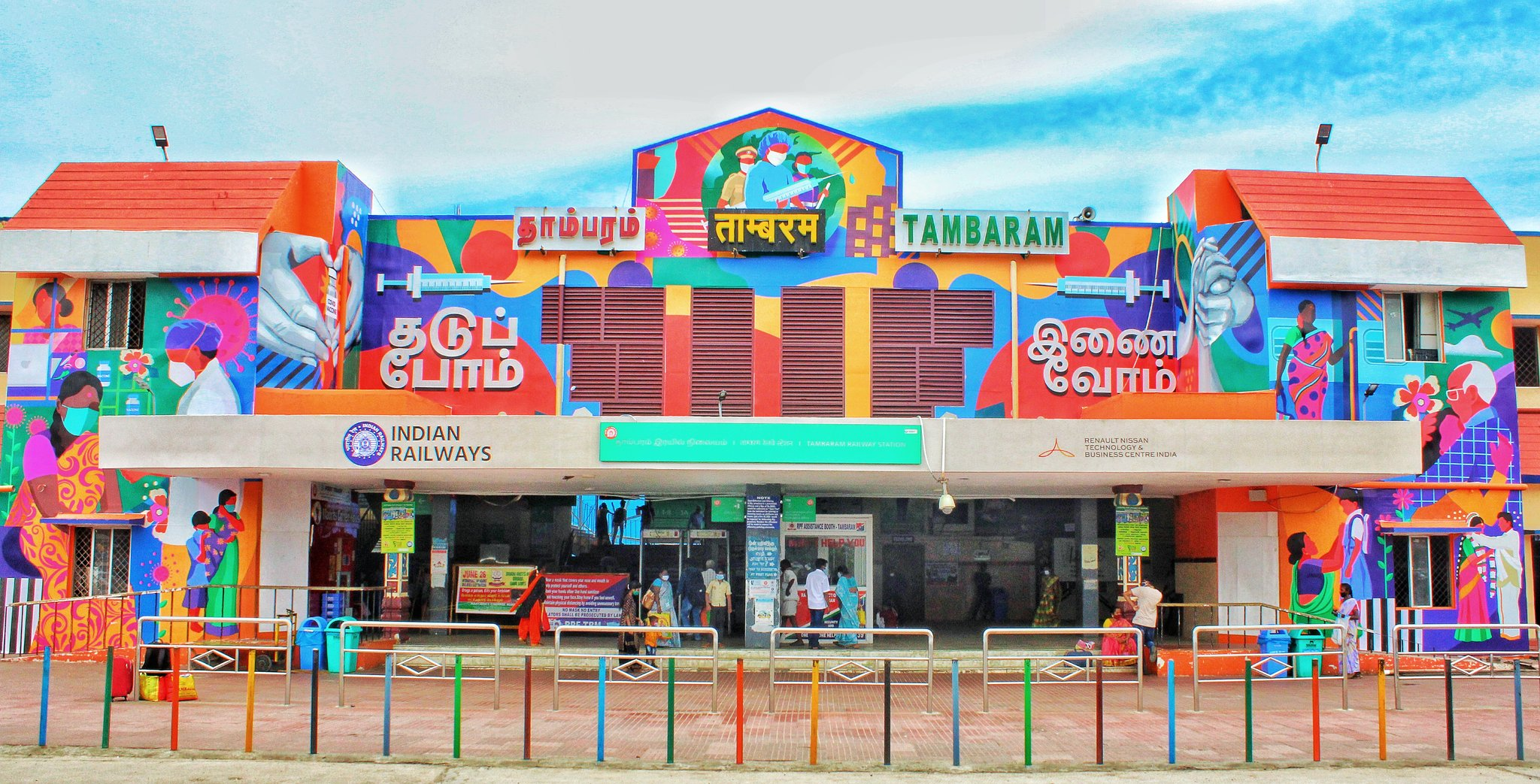
- Tambaram Railway Station

- Emblem

- Location in Chennai Metropolitan Area Location in Tamil Nadu Location in India Location in Asia Location on Earth
- Coordinates: 12°55′29.6″N 80°06′00.0″E
- Country: India
- State: Tamil Nadu
- Metro: Chennai Metropolitan Area
- District: Chengalpattu
- Town incorporated: 1951
- City incorporated: 3 November 2021
- Climate: Tropical Savanna climate with a Dry Winter (Aw)

Government
  - Type: Elected Council–Appointed Commissioner
  - Body: Tambaram City Municipal Corporation
  - Commissioner: S. Balachander IAS
  - Mayor: K. Vasanthakumari (DMK)
  - Deputy Mayor: G. Kamaraj (DMK)
  - National representation (MP): T.R. Baalu (DMK)
  - State representation (MLAs): D. Sarathkumar (TVK)

Area
  - Total: 87.64 km^{2} (33.84 sq mi)
- Elevation: 43 m (141 ft)

Population (2011)
  - Total: 722,982
  - Rank: Tamil Nadu: 6th India: 65th
  - Density: 8,249/km^{2} (21,370/sq mi)

Languages
  - Official: Tamil
  - Additional official: English
- Time zone: UTC+5:30 (IST)
- PINs: 600043-600048, 600059, 600063, 600064, 600070, 600073 - 600075, 600091, 600100, 600117, 600126, 600127, 600129
- Area code: +91-044
- Vehicle Registration: TN 11, TN 22, TN 85
- Law enforcement: Tambaram City Police
- Urban planning agency: CMDA

Tambaram is a city in Chennai metropolitan area, Chengalpattu district of Tamil Nadu, India. The city is governed by Tambaram City Municipal Corporation.

== Etymology ==
Tambaram is an ancient town referred to as Taamapuram in an inscription of the 13th century. The word was inscribed on the walls around the sanctum sanctorum at Marundeeswarar temple in Tirukachur village, near Chengalpattu.

== History ==
The earliest mention of Tambaram dates back to the 13th century when the word 'Taamapuram' was inscribed on the walls around the sanctum sanctorum at Marundeeswarar temple in Tirukachur village, near Chengalpattu.

=== Old Stone Age ===
The oldest locality in the city is Pallavapuram which is considered one of the oldest inhabited places in South Asia. Pallavapuram is most commonly known today as Pallavaram.

On 13 May 1863, Robert Bruce Foote, a British geologist with the Geological Survey of India (GSI), discovered a hand axe belonging to the Lower Palaeolithic Age at Pallavaram (Pallavapuram). Since then, several Stone Age artefacts have been discovered. Most of these artefacts are currently lodged in the Egmore museum.

=== Early Medieval Period ===
==== Pallava Dynasty ====
The oldest locality in the city, Pallavapuram, existed during the reign of Pallava king Mahendravarman I (600–630 CE). The Pallavas have left titles in early Pallava script at the cave temple in Pallavaram neighbourhood, which dates back to 600 CE. The remains of a cave shrine constructed by the Pallava ruler have been found at Asthana-E-Moula Ali Dargah.

==== Chola Dynasty ====
During the reign of Later Cholas, from ninth to twelfth century CE, the region was called Churathur Nadu. Churathur Nadu was named after Thiruchuram, the present-day Trisulam. The Churathur Nadu extended from Tambaram in the south to Adambakkam and Alandur in the north. The region included the areas of Pammal, Pallavaram, and Thiruneermalai.

=== Colonial Period ===
During the Carnatic wars in the late 17th century, the city was an entrenchment camp for the British East India Company. During the 17th century, Pallavaram neighborhood of the city remained dependent upon the Portuguese colony of San Thome. Later, the British established a cantonment at Pallavaram, supplementary to the one at St. Thomas Mount.

A wireless station was established in the early years of the 20th century. The Madras Aerodrome was opened at Pallavaram in 1929.

=== Post-Independence ===
In the 1951 census, Tambaram was classified as a Town Panchayat for the first time. In 1964, Tambaram Town Panchayat was incorporated as a Grade III Municipality by annexing the Village Panchayats of Pulikoradu, Kadapperi, Tambaram, Irumbliyur, and Selaiyur.

Due to rapid development and growth of the town commercially and residentially, the Municipality was classified as a 'Selection Grade Municipality'. The extent of the municipality was 20.72 km^{2} (8.00 sq mi). The revenue villages under this municipality are Pulikoradu, Kadapperi, Tambaram, Irumbliyur, and Selaiyur. The number of households is 26,333, the number of notified slums is 17 and the number of unnotified slums is 7. The Tambaram range comprises forest lands in Nanmangalam, Madurapakkam, Tambaram, Pulikoradu, Kumili, Vandalur, Onnamancherry, Erumaiyur, Vattampakkam and Vadakupattu.

In 2009, Tambaram taluk was trifurcated into Tambaram, Sholinganallur and Alandur taluks. Clubbing all the three taluks, a new revenue division with Tambaram as headquarters was formed.

=== City status ===
The Tambaram City Municipal Corporation was established to address administrative challenges stemming from rapid urbanization in the Tambaram region. On 24 August 2021, Tamil Nadu’s Minister for Municipal Administration, K. N. Nehru, announced a proposal in the Legislative Assembly to create the corporation by merging five municipalities (Anakaputhur, Pallavaram, Pammal, Sembakkam and Tambaram), five town panchayats (Chitlapakkam, Madambakkam, Perungaluthur, Peerkangaranai and Tiruneermalai), and 15 villages from the St Thomas Mount Panchayat Union. However, the inclusion of the villages was halted after the Supreme Court of India mandated rural local body elections by October 2021. Consequently, these villages were excluded from the final plan. The Tambaram City Municipal Corporation Act of 2022 formally established Tambaram City under the municipal corporation’s governance, incorporating only the municipalities and town panchayats. The excluded villages are anticipated to merge with the city after their elected term concludes in 2026.

== Geography ==
=== Climate ===
Tambaram features a tropical savanna climate with a dry winter. Tambaram lies on the thermal equator and is also coastal, which prevents extreme variation in seasonal temperature. For most of the year, the weather is hot and humid. The hottest part of the year is late May and early June, known locally as Agni Nakshatram ("fiery star") or as Kathiri Veyyil, with maximum temperatures around 38–42 °C (100–108 °F). The coolest part of the year is January, with minimum temperatures around 18–20 °C (64–68 °F). The lowest temperature recorded is 15.8 °C (60.4 °F) and highest 45 °C (113 °F)(30 May 2003) both being recorded at the observatory at IMD Numgambakkam.

The average annual rainfall is about 1,400 mm (55 in). The city gets most of its seasonal rainfall from the north-east monsoon winds, from mid-September to mid-December. Cyclones in the Bay of Bengal sometimes hit Tambaram. The highest annual rainfall recorded is 2,570 mm (101 in) in 2005 for IMD Nungambakkam. The most prevailing winds in Tambaram is the Southwesterly between the end of May to end of September and the Northeasterly during the rest of the year.

Climate data for Tambaram, Tamil Nadu, India (Nungambakkam) 1981–2010, extremes 1901–2012
Month	Jan	Feb	Mar	Apr	May	Jun	Jul	Aug	Sep	Oct	Nov	Dec	Year
Record high °C (°F)	34.4 (93.9)	36.7 (98.1)	41.3 (106.3)	42.8 (109.0)	45.0 (113.0)	43.3 (109.9)	41.1 (106.0)	40.0 (104.0)	38.9 (102.0)	39.4 (102.9)	35.4 (95.7)	33.0 (91.4)	45.0 (113.0)
Mean daily maximum °C (°F)	29.3 (84.7)	30.9 (87.6)	32.9 (91.2)	34.5 (94.1)	37.1 (98.8)	37.0 (98.6)	35.3 (95.5)	34.7 (94.5)	34.2 (93.6)	32.1 (89.8)	29.9 (85.8)	28.9 (84.0)	33.1 (91.6)
Daily mean °C (°F)	25.2 (77.4)	26.6 (79.9)	28.7 (83.7)	30.9 (87.6)	32.9 (91.2)	32.4 (90.3)	30.9 (87.6)	30.3 (86.5)	29.8 (85.6)	28.4 (83.1)	26.5 (79.7)	25.3 (77.5)	29.0 (84.2)
Mean daily minimum °C (°F)	21.2 (70.2)	22.2 (72.0)	24.2 (75.6)	26.6 (79.9)	28.0 (82.4)	27.5 (81.5)	26.4 (79.5)	25.9 (78.6)	25.6 (78.1)	24.6 (76.3)	23.1 (73.6)	21.9 (71.4)	24.8 (76.6)
Record low °C (°F)	13.9 (57.0)	15.0 (59.0)	16.7 (62.1)	20.0 (68.0)	21.1 (70.0)	20.6 (69.1)	21.0 (69.8)	20.5 (68.9)	20.6 (69.1)	16.7 (62.1)	15.0 (59.0)	13.9 (57.0)	13.9 (57.0)
Average rainfall mm (inches)	25.9 (1.02)	3.4 (0.13)	3.5 (0.14)	14.4 (0.57)	34.2 (1.35)	55.8 (2.20)	103.8 (4.09)	126.8 (4.99)	147.7 (5.81)	315.6 (12.43)	399.9 (15.74)	177.4 (6.98)	1,382.9 (54.44)
Average rainy days	1.4	0.8	0.3	0.8	1.8	4.0	6.5	7.7	7.3	10.9	11.5	5.8	58.8
Average relative humidity (%) (at 17:30 IST)	67	66	67	70	68	63	65	66	71	76	76	71	69
Mean monthly sunshine hours	232.5	240.1	291.4	294.0	300.7	234.0	142.6	189.1	195.0	257.3	261.0	210.8	2,848.5
Mean daily sunshine hours	7.5	8.5	9.4	9.8	9.7	7.8	4.6	6.1	6.5	8.3	8.7	6.8	7.8
Source 1: Indian Meteorological Department
Source 2: Japan Meteorological Agency

=== Water bodies ===
Some of the notable lakes in and around the suburb are Chitlapakkam Lake, Pallavaram Lake (locally known as Periya eri), Thiruneermalai Lake, Thirupananthal Lake, Peerkankaranai Lake, and Perungalathur Lake.

== Government and politics ==
=== Local government ===
Tambaram is governed by the Tambaram City Municipal Corporation, which was established on November 3, 2021. The executive authority is vested in Corporation Commissioner.

The council of Tambaram City Municipal Corporation consists of elected councillors from each ward. The council is presided over by the mayor who is indirectly elected by the councillors. The mayor is the head of the city government, but the role is largely ceremonial as executive powers are vested in the corporation commissioner. The office of the mayor combines a functional role of chairing the city government meeting as well as a ceremonial role associated with being the First Citizen of the city. Deputy mayor is appointed by the mayor for a five-year term.

==== Administration divisions ====
When Tambaram City Municipal Corporation was established on 3 November 2021, it consisted of 70 wards under 5 zones.

==== Current administration ====
At the present, the corporation is governed by Secular Progressive Alliance which collectively holds 54 out of 70 seats in the council. The opposition is led by All India Anna Dravida Munnetra Kazhagam which holds 9 seats in the council. The current mayor is Vasanthakumari Kamalakannan, who assumed the position on 4 March 2022. The current deputy mayor is G Kamaraj, who assumed the position on 4 March 2022.

=== Law enforcement ===
On 1 January 2021, the Tambaram Police Commissionerate was established as the city police administration of the City of Tambaram. In September 2021, the government revealed its plans of reforming the Greater Chennai City Police and setting up two new commissionerates in Tambaram and Avadi. Subsequently, Director General of Police (DGP) M. Ravi was deputed as special officer to form the Commissionerate. The new Police Commissionerate in Tambaram was formally inaugurated by the Chief Minister M. K. Stalin on 1 January 2022. Additional Director General of Police (ADGP) Amalraj IPS took over charge as Commissioner of Police of Tambaram City Police.

==== Jurisdiction and structure ====
The Tambaram police commissionerate functions with two police districts—Tambaram and Pallikaranai, comprising 20 police stations. For ease of administration, Somangalam and Manimangalam police stations from Kancheepuram district along with Otteri, Guduvanchery, Maraimalai Nagar, Thalambur and Kelambakkam police stations from Chengalpattu district have been attached to the Tambaram Police Commissionerate.

=== Urban planning ===
The CMDA is the nodal agency responsible for planning and development of Tambaram. It is responsible for all the three Municipal Corporation in the Chennai Metropolitan Area—Tambaram City Municipal Corporation, Avadi Municipal Corporation, Greater Chennai Corporation and Kancheepuram City Municipal Corporation.

=== Electoral history ===
==== National elections ====
Members of House of the People
Year	Sriperumbudur
Year	Party	Alliance	Member
2019	DMK	UPA	T. R. Baalu
2024	DMK	INDIA	T. R. Baalu
Source: Election Commission of India

==== State elections ====
Members of Tamil Nadu Legislative Assembly
Year	Pallavaram		Tambaram
Year	Party	Member	Party	Member
2021	DMK	I. Karunanithi	DMK	S. R. Raja
Source: Election Commission of India

==== Local elections ====
Popular vote
Year	AAP		AIADMK		BJP		CPI(M)		DMDK		DMK		INC
Year	Votes	+/-	Votes	+/-	Votes	+/-	Votes	+/-	Votes	+/-	Votes	+/-	Votes	+/-
2022	1.05	—	24.65%	—	5.98%	—	0.79%	—	2.62%	—	39.92%	—	2.26%	—
Source: Tamil Nadu State Election Commission

Seats
Year	AAP		AIADMK		BJP		CPI(M)		DMDK		DMK		INC
Year	Seats	+/-	Seats	+/-	Seats	+/-	Seats	+/-	Seats	+/-	Seats	+/-	Seats	+/-
2022	0	—	9	—	0	—	1	—	0	—	50	—	2	—
Source: Tamil Nadu State Election Commission

== Demographics ==
Population
Year	Population	±%p.a
2021 (est.)	960,887	+3.29%
2011	722,982	—
Source: Office of the Registrar General and Census Commissioner, India

According to the 2011 Census of India conducted by the Office of the Registrar General and Census Commissioner, Tambaram had a population of 722,982, with 364,012 being male and 358,970 being female. The 2021 population estimates project the population of Tambaram at 960,887.

=== Gender ===
Sex Ratio
Year			Relative Difference
Year	Sex Ratio	±%p.a	Tamil Nadu	India
2011	986	—	▼ −10	▲ +43
Source: Office of the Registrar General and Census Commissioner, India

Gender Parity in Adult Literacy
Year			Relative Difference
Year	Literacy	±%p.a	Tamil Nadu	India
2011	0.93	—	▲ +0.09	▲ +0.14
Source: Office of the Registrar General and Census Commissioner, India

=== Caste ===
Caste
Year	SCs		STs		OBCs		Others
Year	%	±%p.a	%	±%p.a	%	±%p.a	%	±%p.a
2011	15.09%	—	0.57%	—	—	—	84.32%	—
Source: Office of the Registrar General and Census Commissioner, India

=== Language ===
Native Language Speakers
Year	Tamil		Telugu		Urdu		Malayalam		Hindi		Kannada
Year	%	±%p.a	%	±%p.a	%	±%p.a	%	±%p.a	%	±%p.a	%	±%p.a
2011	87.02%	—	8.14%	—	2.37%	—	2.10%	—	1.44%	—	0.77%	—
Source: Office of the Registrar General and Census Commissioner, India

=== Religion ===
Religion
Year	Hindus		Christians		Muslims		Jains		Sikhs		Buddhist
Year	%	±%p.a	%	±%p.a	%	±%p.a	%	±%p.a	%	±%p.a	%	±%p.a
2011	82.97%	—	10.23%	—	6.47%	—	0.19%	—	0.05%	—	0.03%	—
Source: Office of the Registrar General and Census Commissioner, India

== Economy ==
When established, Tambaram City Municipal Corporation was estimated to earn ₹ 3 billion in revenue approximately through local bodies connected to it.

=== Madras Export Processing Zone ===
Madras Export Processing Zone (MEPZ) is a special economic zone located on GST Road, six kilometres (3.7 mi) south of Chennai International Airport. It is one of the seven export processing zones in the country set up by the central government. It was established in 1984 to promote foreign direct investment, enhance foreign exchange earnings, and create greater employment opportunities in the region.

The zone is under the administrative control of the Ministry of Commerce and Industries and caters to the needs of units within the SEZ, in addition to monitoring the functions of 100-percent export-oriented units (EOUs) located in Tamil Nadu, Pondicherry, and Andaman & Nicobar Islands. The zone is headed by a development commissioner.

Spread over an area of 265 acres (109 hectares), MEPZ SEZ is a multi-product zone housing 117 functional units. In addition, another 27 units are under various stages of implementation. The zone employs over 26,000 people. In the manufacturing front, there are 110 SME units in the zone. MEPZ's manufacturing sector employs nearly 20,000 people. IT companies housed in the zone include Cognizant Technology Solutions, Computer Sciences Corporation, CSS and HTC Global Services among others. About 50 container trucks arrive at and leave the zone every day.

== Culture ==
=== Architecture ===
==== Dravidian ====
===== Medieval Cholas =====
====== Dhenupureeswarar Temple ======
Dhenupureeswarar Temple is also known as Dhenupurisvara, and Thiripureeswarar temple. These names are colloquial name of Hindu deity Shiva. The temple is located in the area of Madambakkam and it was built during the reign of Parantaka Chola II (r. 962–980 CE).

The garbhagriha, which is Sanskrit equivalent of sanctum sanctorum, houses the primary deity Dhenupureeswara in linga form. The main garbhagriha is apsidal in shape and this is a characteristic feature of Shiva Temples built during Chola Period. This type of garbhagriha are known as gajaprishta vimana, where "gajaprishta" literally means "back of an elephant" in Samskrit. This type of vimana here is a separate south-facing garbhagriha for the Dhenupureeswarar's Consort Goddess Dhenukambal adjacent to the main garbhagriha.

The temple is one of the 163 megalithic sites in the state of Tamil Nadu. The temple has been declared a monument of national importance under the Ancient Monuments and Archaeological Sites and Remains (amendment and validation) 2010 Act. The temple has been conserved and restored by Archaeological Survey of India.

== Infrastructure ==
=== Transportation ===
==== Rail ====
The Tambaram Railway Station serves as one of the four primary terminals of the Indian Railways in the Chennai Metropolitan Area. The other three terminals are Chennai Central, Chennai Egmore, Chennai Beach. The inter-state railway service is provided by Southern Railway of Indian Railways. The inter-city railway service is provided by Chennai Suburban Railway operated by Indian Railways.

===== Inter-state =====
Similar to Chennai Egmore Station, Tambaram Railway Station provides access to destinations primarily within Tamil Nadu; however, it also handles a few interstate trains.

===== Inter-city =====
====== Chennai Suburban Railway ======
The Chennai Suburban Railway is a commuter rail system in the Chennai Metropolitan Area, operated by the Indian Railways. Every day, 160 train services are operated between Chennai Beach and Tambaram, 70 between Tambaram and Chengalpet and 16 between Tambaram and Kancheepuram.

The City is served by the South Line of Chennai Suburban Railway which runs between Chennai Beach to Chengalpattu. The South Line connects Tambaram with seven major interchange stations out of the eight in Chennai Suburban Railway Network.

The longest circular train in India runs through Tambaram, connecting the City with Chennai Beach, Egmore, Chengalpattu, Kanchipuram, Takkolam, Arakkonam Junction, Tiruvallur, Avadi, Ambattur, Vyasarpadi Jeeva, Washermanpet and Royapuram.

== Notable places ==
- Embassy Splendid IT Park, Pallavaram
- Madras Institute of Technology, Chromepet, Pallavapuram. Former president A.P.J. Abdul Kalam was a student of this institute.
- Madras Christian College, East Tambaram
- Tambaram Air Force Station, Selaiyur
- Thiruneermalai (temple complex), one among the 108 Divya desams
- Rettai Pillayar Koil, Pammal
- National Institute of Siddha, Kadapperi, Tambaram
- Government Hospital of Thoracic Medicine, Tambaram Sanatorium, Chitlapakkam
- Government Hospital, Chromepet, Pallavapuram
- Airport Authority of India Signal Office, Iyyappa Nagar, Pammal
- Dhenupureeswarar Temple, Madambakkam
- Catholic Shrine of Our Lady of Fatima, East Tambaram
- Sankara Eye Hospital, Pammal
- Sri Sankara Vidyalaya Matriculation Higher Secondary School, Pammal
- PKS Fishmarket, Nagalkeni, Pammal
- Holy Family Convent Matriculation Higher Secondary School, Keelkattalai, Pallavapuram
- Vels Institute of Science, Technology & Advanced Studies, Pallavaram, Pallavapuram

== Gallery ==
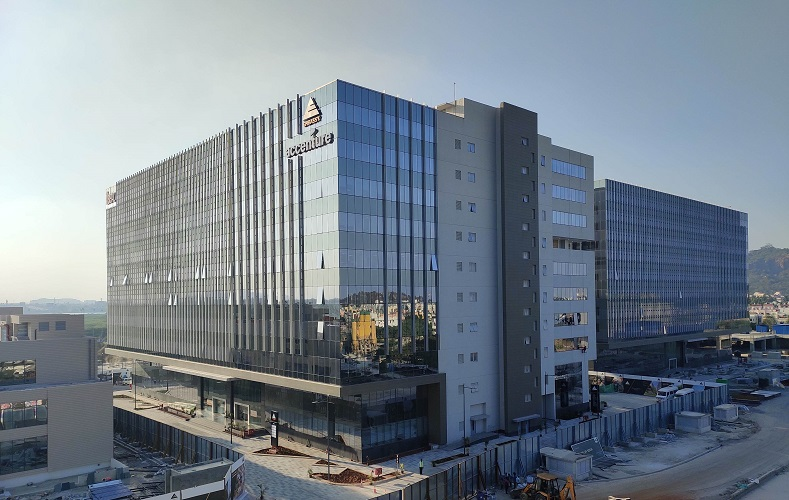
Embassy Splendid Tech Zone, Pallavaram

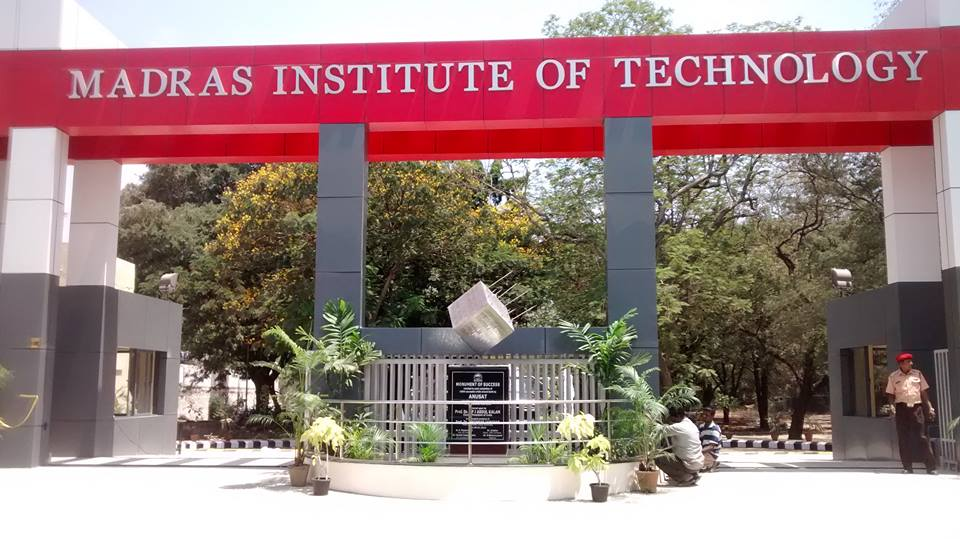
MIT's newly built entrance

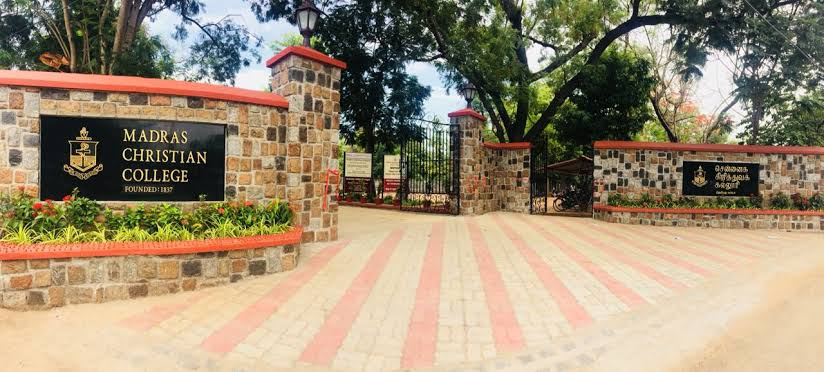
Madras Christian College entrance

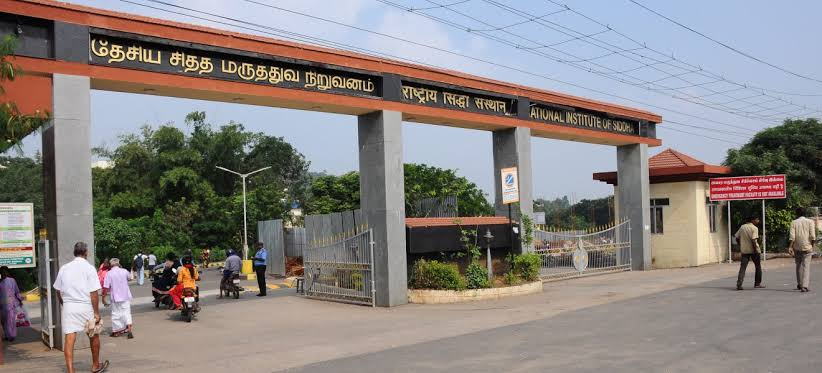
National Institute of Siddha entrance

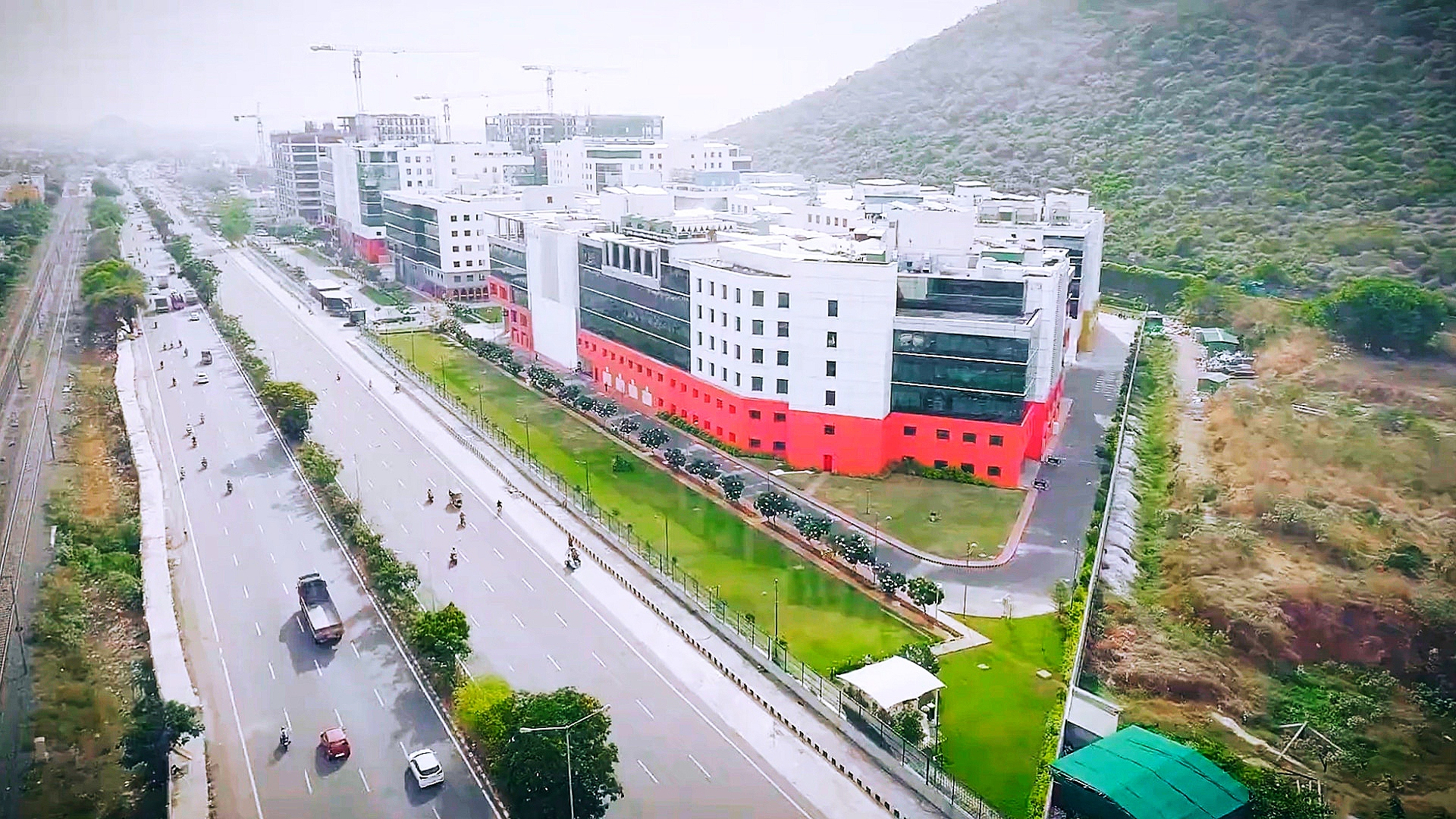
Perungalathur Gateway office park

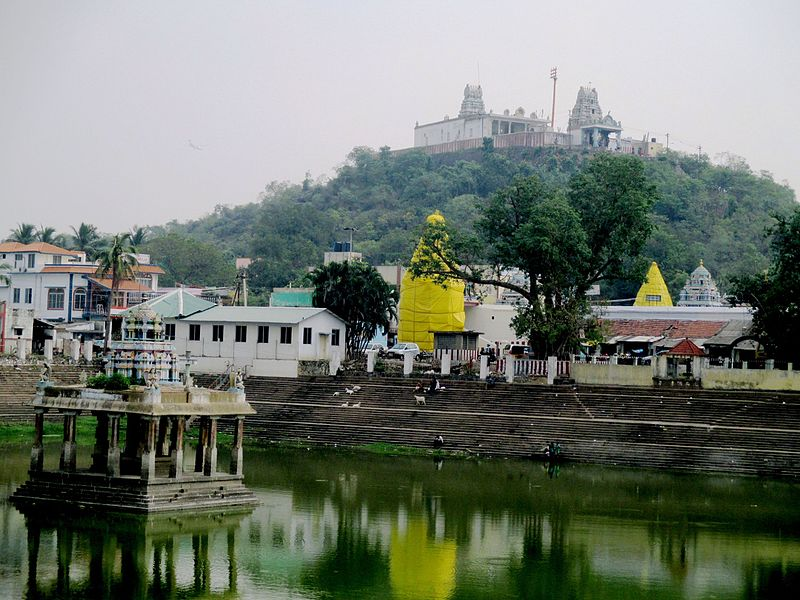
Thiruneermalai Temple overlooking the temple pond

== See also ==
- Tambaram City Municipal Corporation
- Tambaram Police
- Chennai Metropolitan Area
- Chennai Metropolitan Development Authority
- List of municipal corporations in Tamil Nadu
