= Vallakottai Subramaniyaswami temple =

Hindu temple in Vallakottai, Tamil Nadu, India

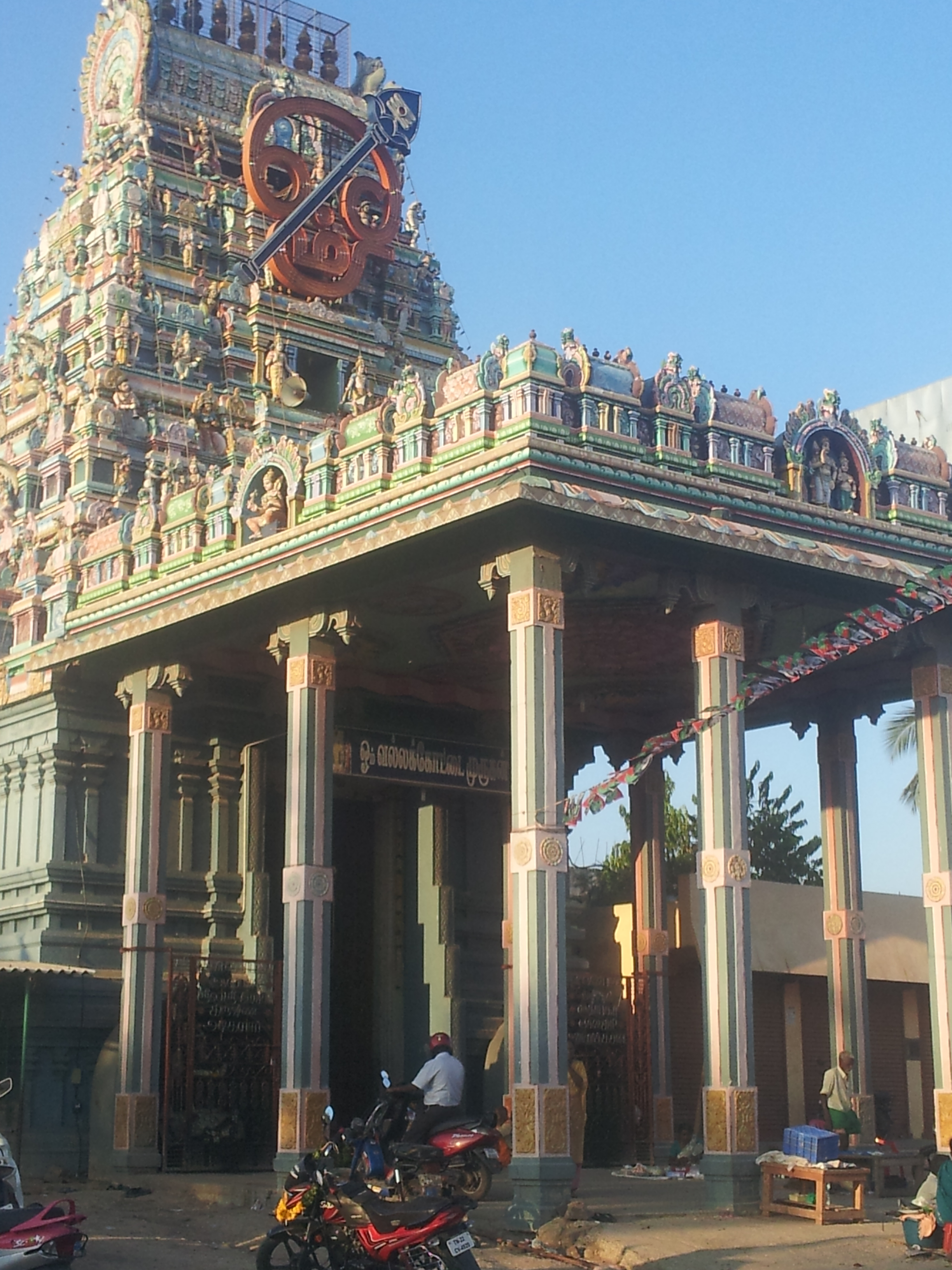

- Location in Tamil Nadu

Religion
- Affiliation: Hinduism
- District: Kanchipuram
- Deity: Subramaniyaswami (Murugan)

Location
- Location: Vallakottai
- State: Tamil Nadu
- Country: India
- Interactive map of Vallakottai Subramaniyaswami temple
- Coordinates: 12°53′01″N 79°56′00″E

Architecture
- Type: Tamil Hindu Style Of architecture, Rock cut

Website
- vallakottaimurugantemple.tnhrce.in

Vallakottai Subramaniyaswami temple (or Vallakottai Murugan temple) in Vallakottai, a panchayat town in Kanchipuram district in the South Indian state of Tamil Nadu, is dedicated to the Hindu god Murugan. Constructed in the Tamil Hindu style of architecture, the temple is located in the Sriperumbudur - Singaperumalkoil road.

The temple has a gateway leading to a pillared hall and the sanctum. The temple is open from 6:30 am – 12:00 pm and 5 - 8:30 pm. Five daily rituals and many yearly festivals are held at the temple, of which the Adi Pooram festival being the most prominent. The temple is maintained and administered by the Hindu Religious and Endowment Board of the Government of Tamil Nadu.

== Legend ==
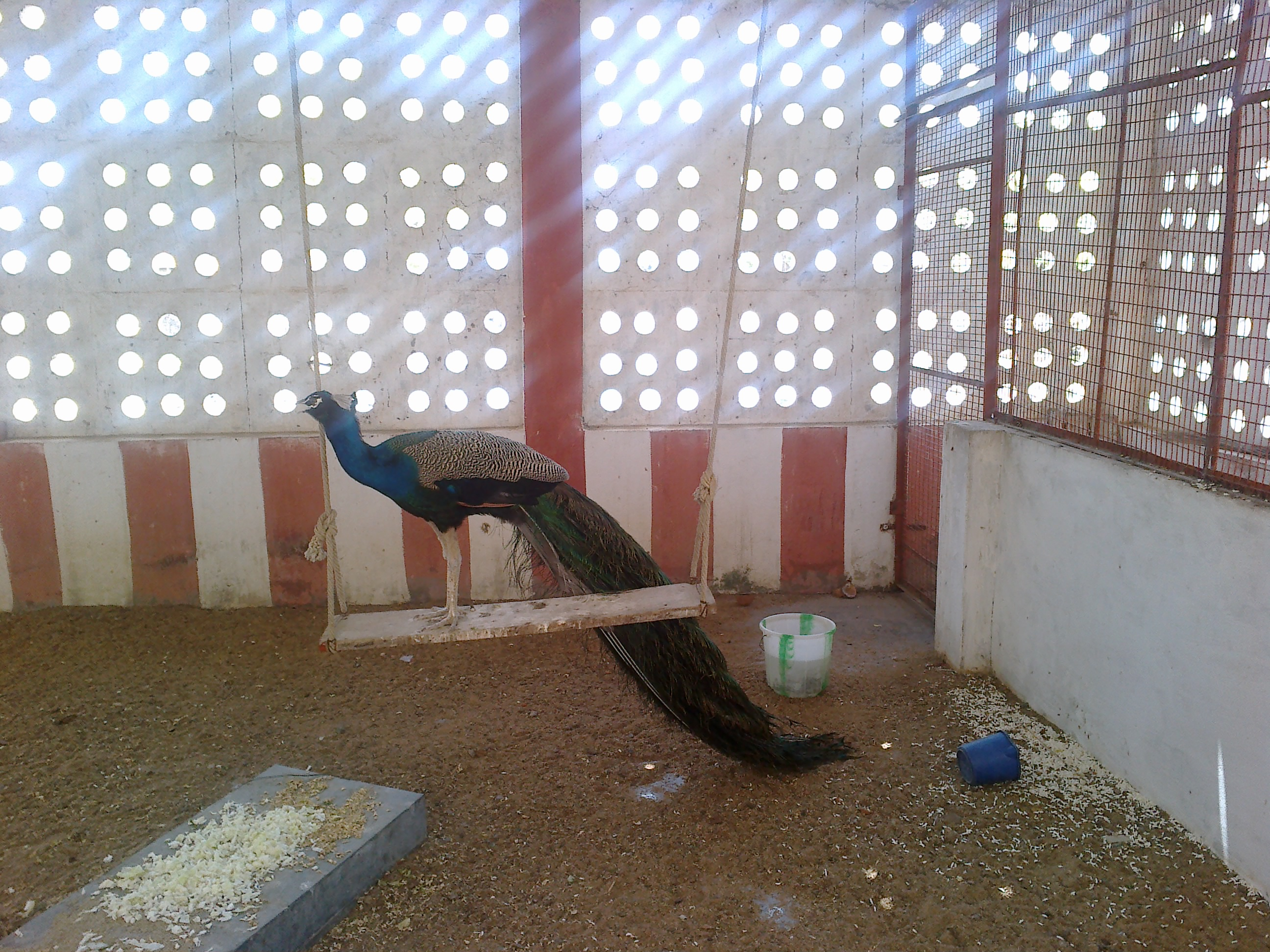
A peacock in the temple enclosure

As per Hindu legend, there was a demon by name Vallan who was troubling the Devas, the celestial deities. The Devas sought the help of Murugan. He informed them that the time had come to destroy the demon. He eventually waged a war and slayed the demon at the place. He established the place as Vallan Kottai, literally meaning the "Fort of Vallan". Indra, the king of Devas, requested his Guru Brihaspathi to suggest a place for him to worship Murugan. He suggested going to Vallakottai, an abode of Murugan. Indra came to Vallakottai, pierced the earth with his weapon Vajrayudha to create a tank to extract water. He performed ablution to image of Murugan at this place and attained his needs. Since Indra created the tank with his Vajrayudha, the temple tank is named as Vajra Theertha.

As per another legend, a king by name Bhagiratha was ruling the Elanji kingdom. He was very haughty to sage Naratha and to teach him a lesson for his behaviour, Naratha infuriated a demon king named Goran to attack Elanji kingdom. Goran was a powerful demon and he made a sudden attack. Bhagiratha was unable to control the forces and eventually lost the battle to Goran. Realising his mistake, he sought the advice of Naratha. The sage advised him to find sage Durvasa, who could find a resolution. The king roamed around the forest for a long time and finally found Durvasa. The sage advised him to worship Murugan at Vallakottai to get back his kingdom. The king worshipped Murugan at this place for a long time and built the temple.

== Architecture ==
As per the hagiographical records from the region, the temple is believed to have been built during the 9th century. The temple is located in Vallakottai, in Kanchipuram district in Tamil Nadu on the road from Sriperumbudur to Singaperumalkoil. The temple has a five tiered rajagopuram, the gateway tower and pillared porch in front of it. The sanctum faces East and the image of the presiding deity is 7 ft (2.1 m) tall in standing posture. There are twin images of peacock, the divine bird of Muruga, facing the presiding deity. In modern times, the temple is maintained and administered by the Hindu Religious and Charitable Endowments Department of the Government of Tamil Nadu.

== Religious significance ==
Vallakottai temple is revered in Thirupugazh composed by Arunagirinathar, a 15th-century saint. The temple is revered in eight verses by the saint. As per a legend, the saint worshipped Murugan at Thiruporur temple and was on his way to Thiruthani Murugan Temple. During his sleep, a divine voice directed him to go to Vallakottai temple. He woke up to realise it was the order of Murugan and he visited the temple. The temple is considered equal in importance to the Arupadaiveedu, the six abodes of Murugan.

== Festival and religious practices ==
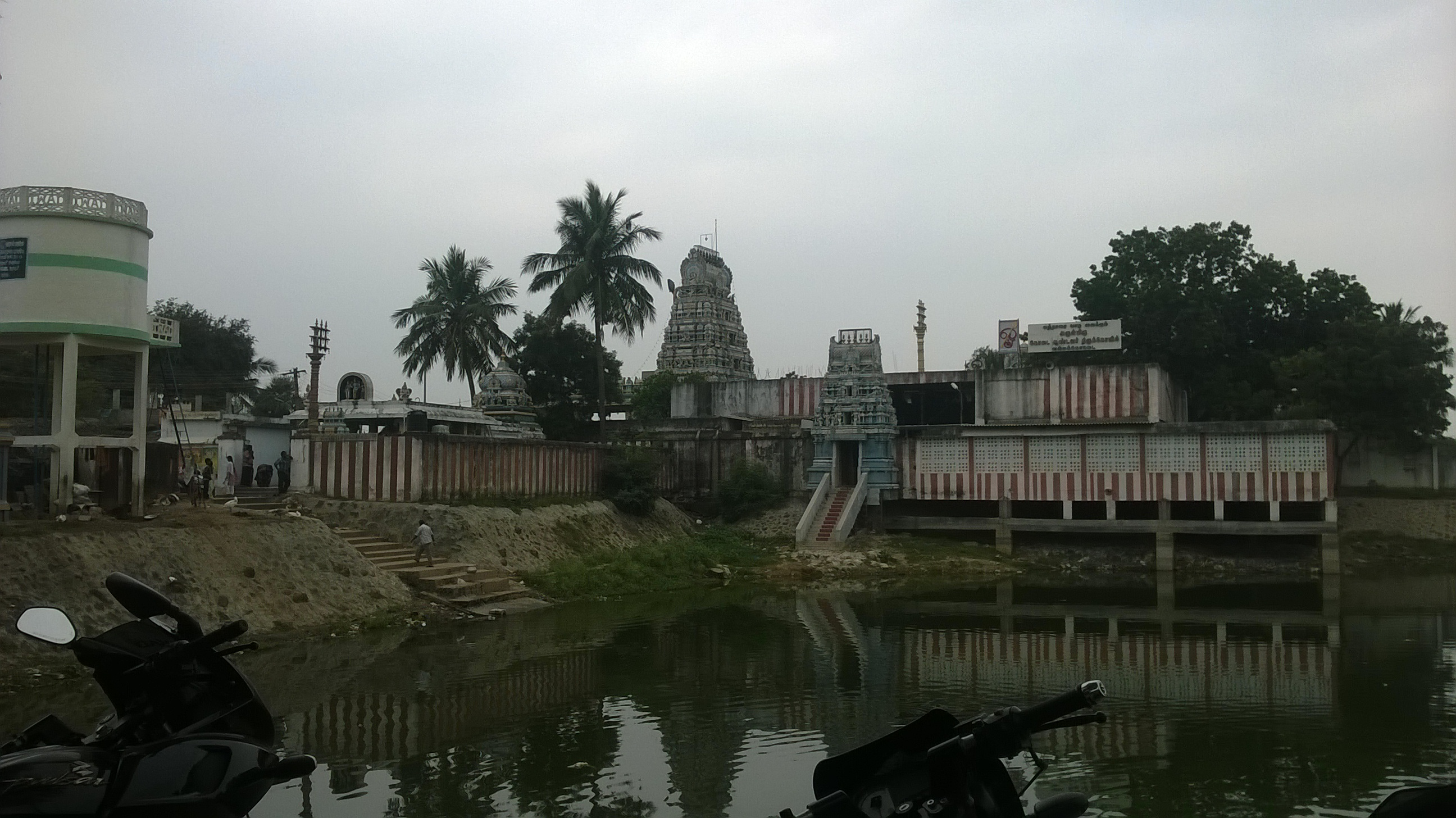
Kodai Andavar temple tank

The temple priests perform the pooja (rituals) during festivals and on a daily basis. The temple rituals are performed five times a day: Gho Pooja at 6:30 a.m., Kalasandhi at 8:00 a.m., Uchikala poojai at 8:00 a.m., Sayarakshai at 6:00 p.m., and Arthajama Pooja at 8:15 p.m. Each ritual has three steps: alangaram (decoration), neivethanam (food offering) and deepa aradanai (waving of lamps) for the presiding deities. There are weekly, monthly and fortnightly rituals performed in the temple. The temple is open from 6:30 am – 12:00 pm and 5–8:30 pm on all days except during festive occasions when it has extended timings. The major festivals of the temple include the Adi Kiruthikai festival celebrated during the Tamil month of Adi (June - July).
