= Vallakottai =

- town
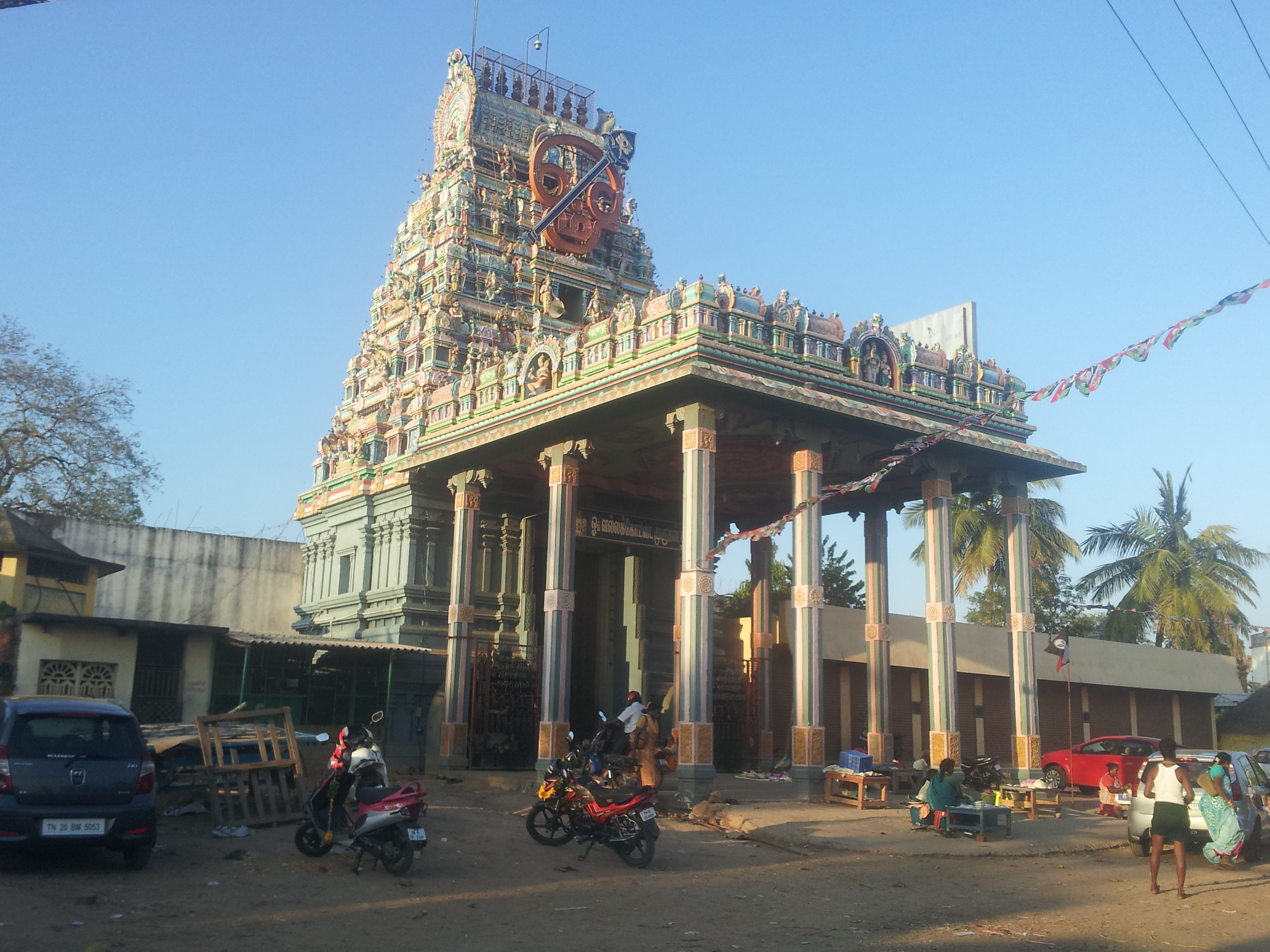

- Location in Tamil Nadu, India
- Coordinates: 12.8830°N 79.9347°E
- Country: India
- State: Tamil Nadu
- District: Kanchipuram
- Talukas: Sriperumbudur Taluk

Languages
  - Official: Tamil
- Time zone: UTC+5:30 (IST)
- PIN: 602105

Vallakottai is a town near Chennai, India. It is situated on the highway between Sriperumbudur and Singaperumalkoil near Chengalpattu.

The Vallakottai Subramaniyaswami temple is in Vallakottai. The Subramaniya Swamy idol in this temple is the tallest Lord Muruga statue in India. People from various places visit this temple during festival days.

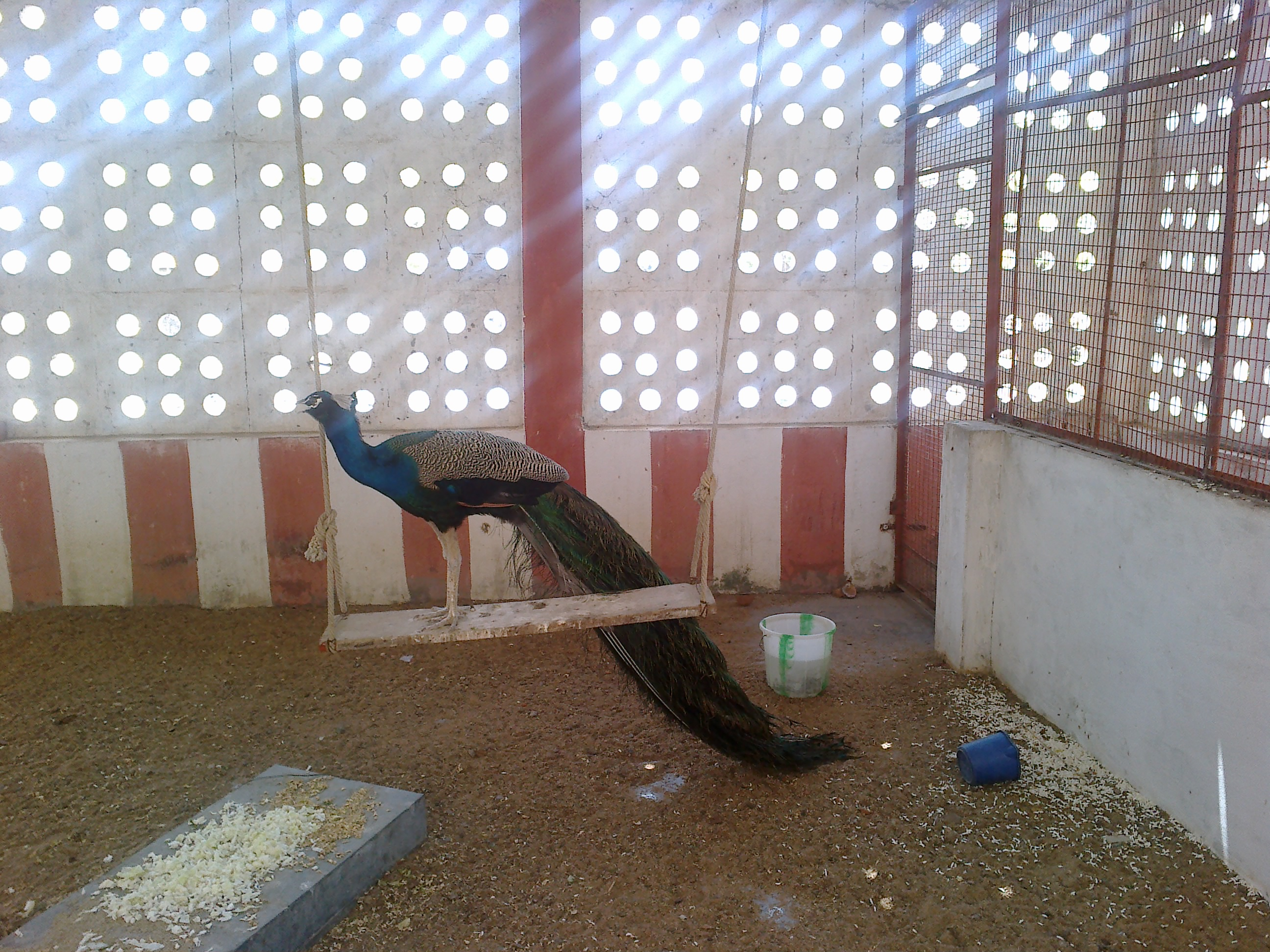
A peacock at The Subramaniya Swamy Temple

Frequent bus facility is available to the village from Tambaram and Sriperumbudur.
