= Marundeeswarar Temple, Thirukachur =

Shiva temple in Tamil Nadu, India

Marundeeswarar Temple
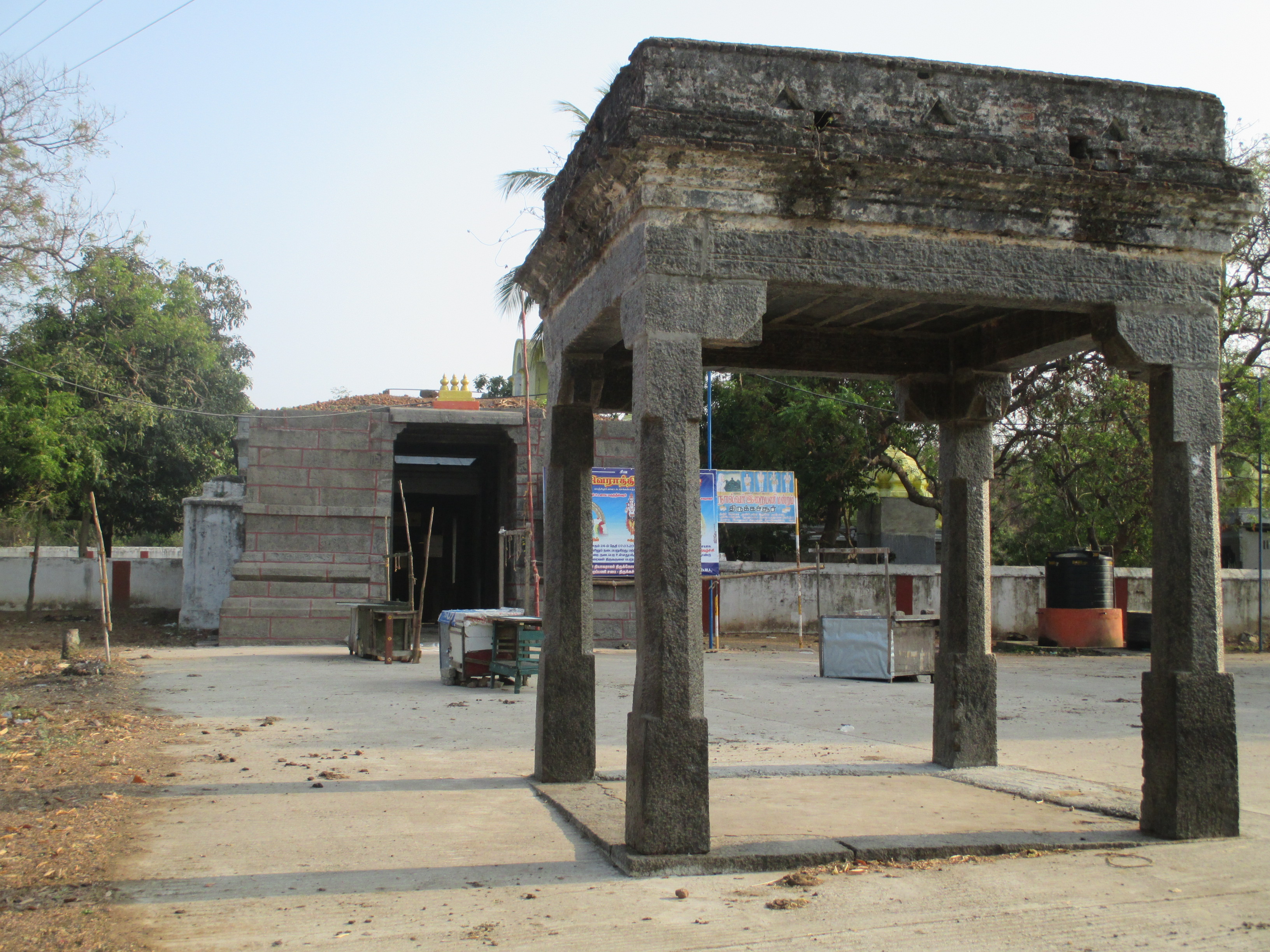

- Location in Tamil Nadu

Religion
- Affiliation: Hinduism
- District: Kanchipuram
- Deity: Marundeeswarar(Shiva)

Location
- State: Tamil Nadu
- Country: India
- Coordinates: 12°46′39″N 79°59′29″E

Architecture
- Type: Dravidian architecture

Marundeeswarar Temple or Oushadheeshwar Temple is a Hindu temple dedicated to the deity Shiva. Shiva is worshipped as Marundeeswarar, and is represented by the lingam. His consort Sati is depicted as Anjanakshi. The presiding deity is associated with the 7th century Tamil Saiva Nayanars Sundarar. The temple is counted as a twin temple along with Kachabeswarar temple, the place where Lord Vishnu did penances to Lord Shiva to incarnate into his Kachaba (Tortoise) Avatar.

The temple complex covers an area of one acre and all its shrines are enclosed with a granite concentric rectangular walls. The temple has a number of shrines, with those of Marundeeswarar and his consort Irulneeki Thayar being the most prominent.

The original complex is believed to have been built by Cholas, while the present masonry structure was built during the 16th century. In modern times, the temple is maintained and administered by the Hindu Religious and Charitable Endowments Department of the Government of Tamil Nadu.

== Legend and history ==
As per Hindu legend, Anjanakshi as the skin of Matha Sati fell on Mount Rudragiri on which the temple is situated. Anjanakshi means "Destroyer of Darkness," owing to two legends, one the burst of fire that happened when the mother's skin fell on the mountain; the other belief is that Matha Sati provided bright light from the sky to Brahma and Vishnu when they searched for a lost weapon in the area in the dark. Also, the Devas, the celestial deities, including Indra got cured of their illness by worshiping Shiva at this place and by the holy herbs obtained from the Mount Rudragiri on which Matha Satí's skin fell off and merged with Bhumadevi creating precious medicinal herbs. The present temple is situated on Rudragiri. The Devas were treated by Aswani Devata, the divine doctor at the behest of Shiva. Also, Lord Shiva appeared during a plague, during which the sage there was unable to make medicines for a lot of people. The Lord told people to eat a little of the mud of the holy Mount Rudragiri on which His consort Satí's skin merged, to get cured and this saved the people from the plague. Shiva henceforth obtained the name Marundeeswarar (Oushadheeshwar), Marundu literally means a Medicine. The temple has a recorded history from the 10th century, but scholar attribute the presence of the temple at least from the 8th century, pertaining to the period of Sundarar, the famous Saiva Nayanar. Sundarar has glorified the temple in his verses in 11th Thirumurai of Thevaram. The temple is counted as a twin temple along with Marundeeswarar Temple located in the same village.

== Architecture ==
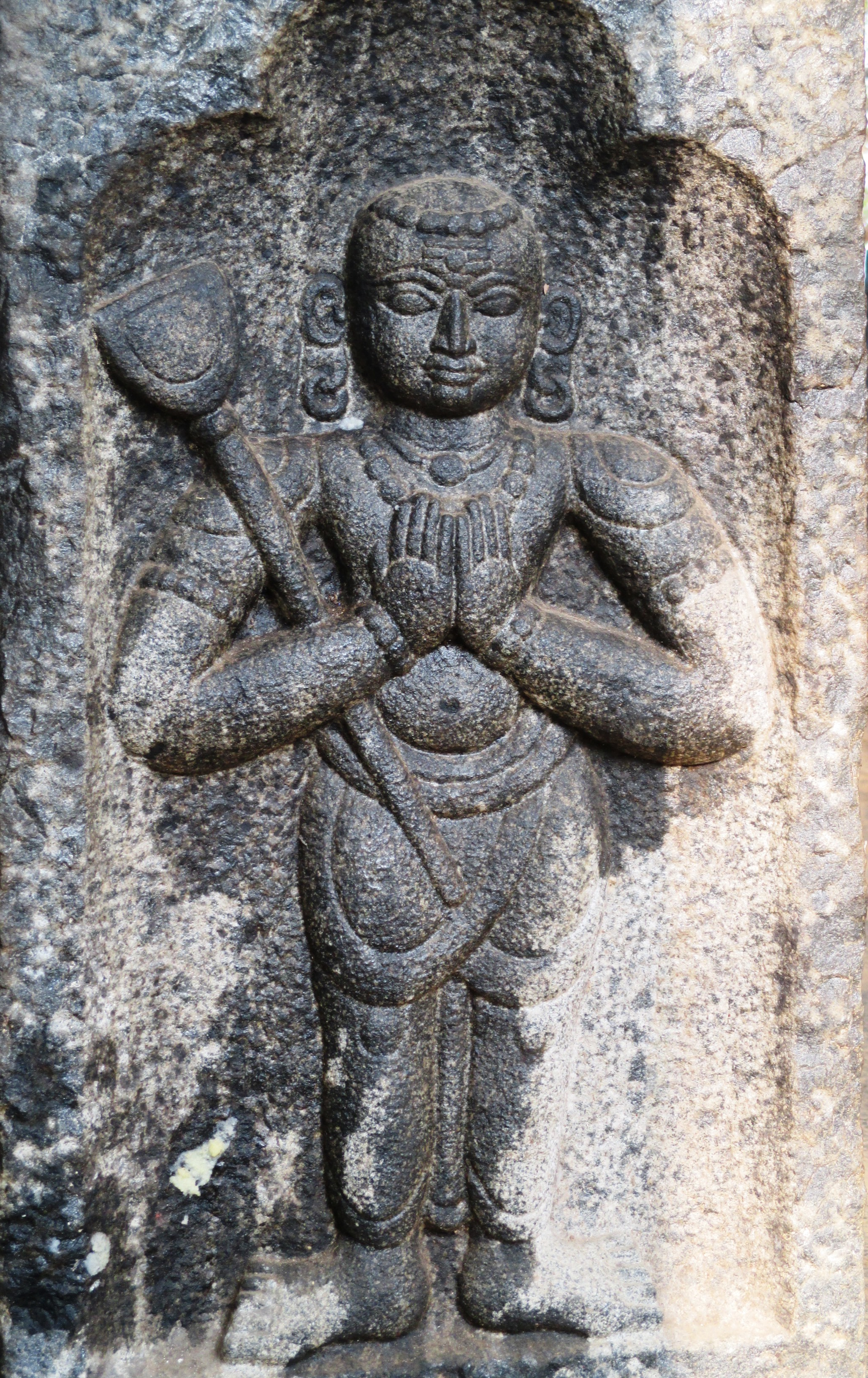
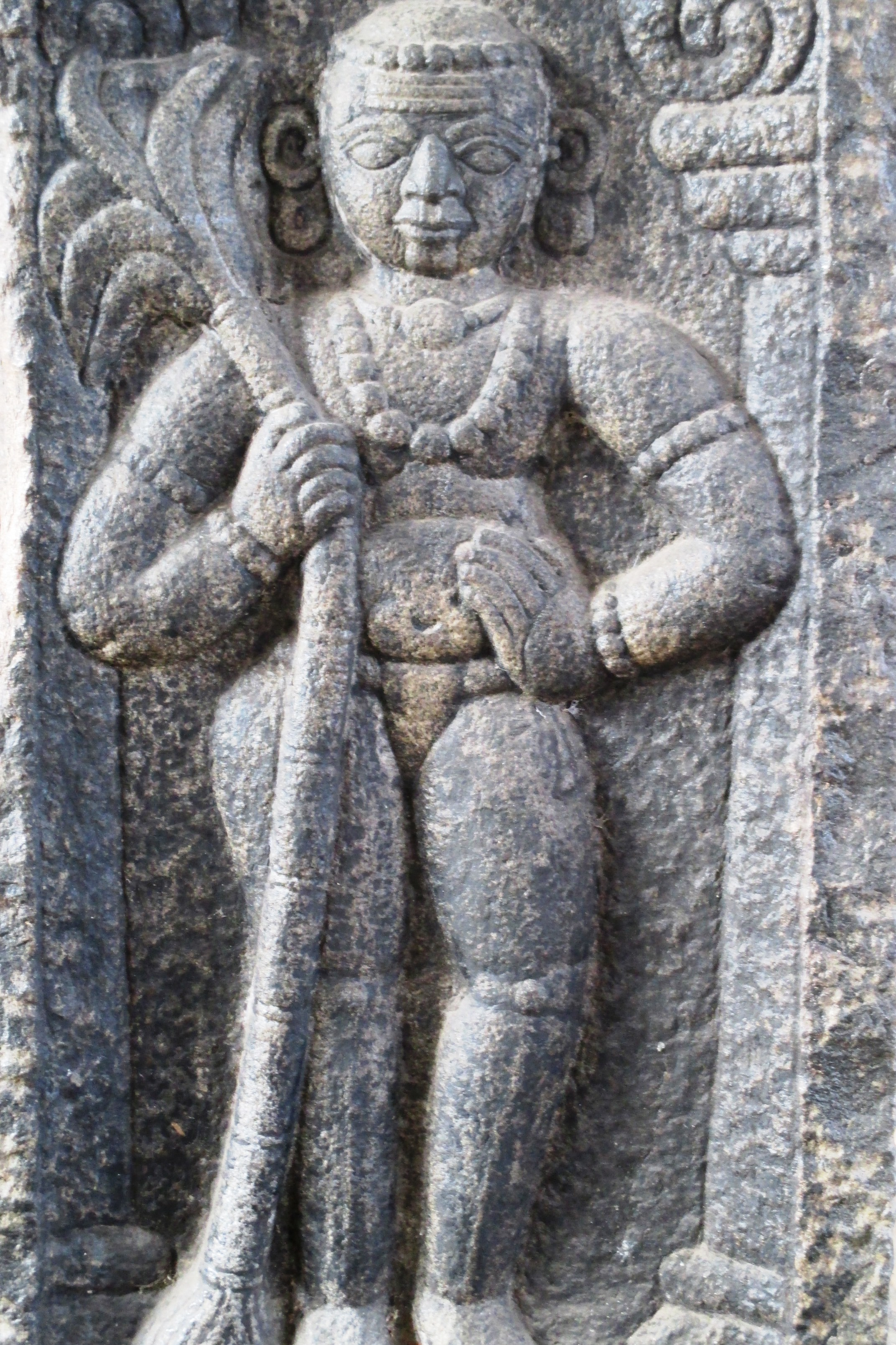
Sculptures on the pillars of the temple

The temple is located in foothills in Tirukachur a village in Kanchipuram district. The temple has a flat gateway tower and all the shrines of the temple are enclosed in concentric rectangular granite walls. The temple occupies an area of around 1 acre (0.40 ha). The central shrine houses the image of Marundeeswarar in the form of Lingam. The shrine of Irulneeki Thayar (also called Anthaga Nivarini), facing East is located in a shrine behind sanctum. The central shrine is approached through a Mahamandapam and Arthamandapam. As in other Shiva temples in Tamil Nadu, the shrines of Vinayaka, Murugan, Navagraha, Chandekeswara and Durga are located around the precinct of the main shrine. There is a shrine depicting Shiva offering food to Sundarar on the Western side. There are images of Vianyaga, Thandapani, Appar, Sambandar, Pattinathar, Vallalar in the temple. Sundarar has made a mention of the event, calling the deity as Marundeeswarar, Virundeeswarar and Iranthittai Eswarar. The temple has a sculpted image of the legend indicating Siva feeding Sundarar. The image of Chandesa is depicted with four heads. In modern times, the temple is maintained and administered by the Hindu Religious and Charitable Endowments Department of the Government of Tamil Nadu.

== See also ==
- Kachabeswarar temple, Thirukachur
- Padalathri Temple
