= Adikesava Perumal temple, Sriperumpudur =

Hindu temple in Tamil Nadu

Adi Kesava temple
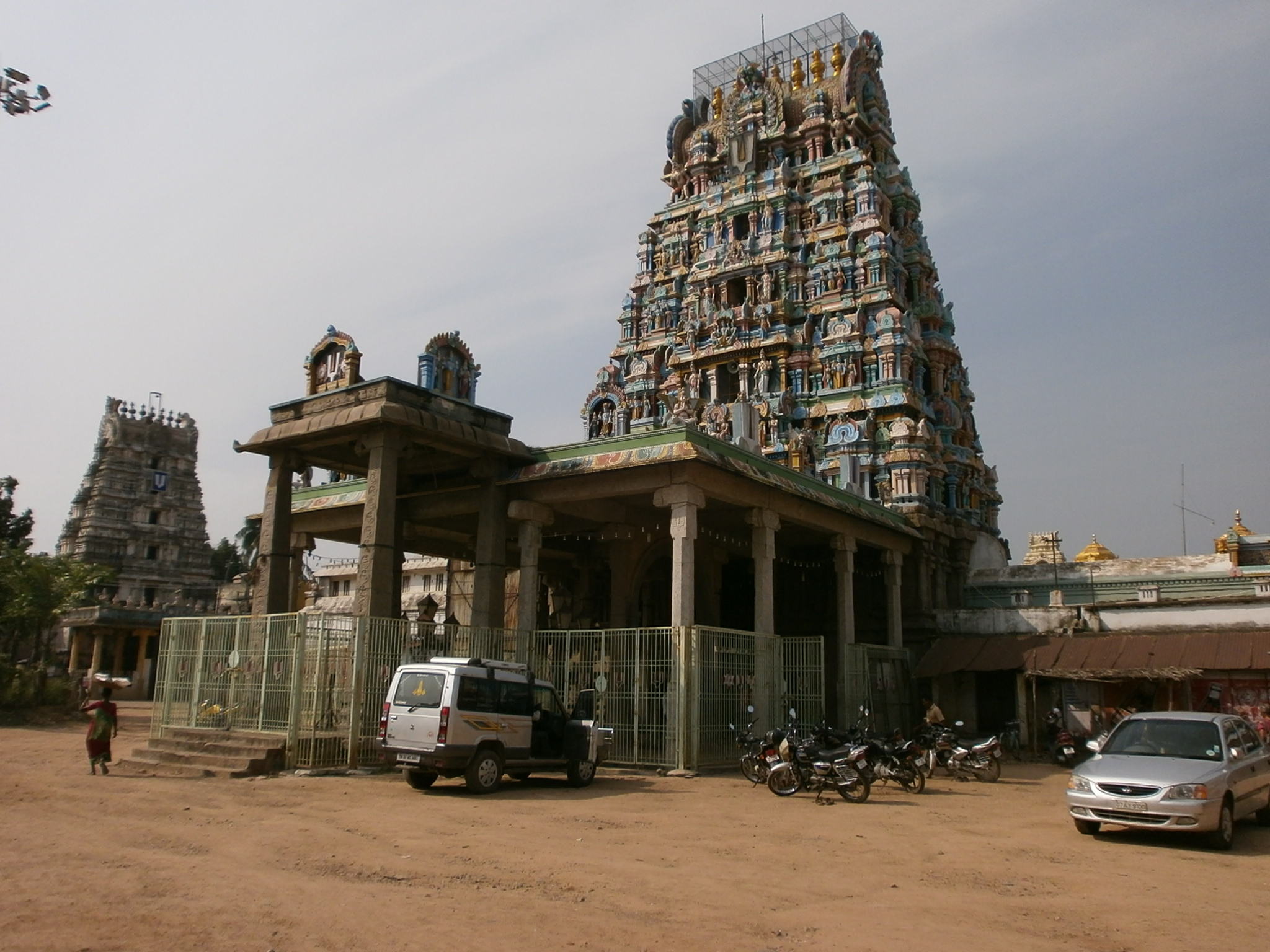

- Location in Tamil Nadu

Religion
- Affiliation: Hinduism
- District: Kanchipuram
- Deity: Adi Kesava (Vishnu) Yathirajanatha Valli (Lakshmi)

Location
- Location: Sriperumbudur
- State: Tamil Nadu
- Country: India
- Coordinates: 12°58′06″N 79°56′55″E

Architecture
- Type: Dravidian architecture

Adi Kesava Temple (also called Ramanujar Temple) is dedicated to Hindu god Vishnu located in Sriperumbudur, Kanchipuram district, in the South Indian state of Tamil Nadu. Constructed in the Dravidian style of architecture, Vishnu, who is worshipped as Adi Kesava, and his consort Lakshmi as Ethiraja Nadhavalli. The temple is believed to be the birthplace of Ramanuja, the exponent of Vishishtadvaita philosophy. The gold plated shrine in front of the hall of Ramanuja was built by the Maharaja of Mysore. It is considered one among the 108 Abhimana Kshethram of Vaishnavate tradition.

The temple is open from 6:30 a.m. to 12 p.m. and 4 p.m. to 8 p.m and has six daily rituals at various times of the day. Various festivals are celebrated in the temple, with the Chitirai Brahmotsavam, Masi Pooram festival during February - March and Panguni Uthiram festival during March - April being the most prominent. The temple is maintained and administered by the Hindu Religious and Endowment Board of the Government of Tamil Nadu.

== Legend ==
Ramanuja (1017–1137 CE) was a Hindu theologian, philosopher, and scriptural exegete, born in a Tamil family at Sriperumbudur. Vaishnavas see him as one of the most important acharyas (teacher) of their tradition, and as the leading expounder of Vishishtadvaita, one of the classical interpretations of the Vedic philosophy. Ramanuja grew up under the tutelage of Tirumalai Nambi, who was working in Tirumala Venkateswara Temple. Once, a king wanted to punish Ramanuja. Ramanuja's disciple, Koorathalvar, helped Ramanuja escape and gave him a white cloth to wear. Ramanuja escaped, but the king punished Koorathalvar by blinding his eyes. Following the event, a festival is celebrated in the temple where Ramanuja appears in a white cloth for Koorathalvar. Once, a king took the idol of Narayanapuram to please his daughter. Ramanuja went to Delhi to recover the idol and the idol is believed to have fallen on his lap as a child by divine powers as a child. The Chella Pillai Utsavam is held every year commemorating the event. As per another legend, a king tried to kill a tiger that was trying to attack a cow. In spite of his efforts, the cow was killed by the tiger and the king incurred the curse of the cow. To expiate himself from the sin, he did penance at his place. Adi Kesava is believed to have appeared for the king and relieved his curse.

== Architecture ==
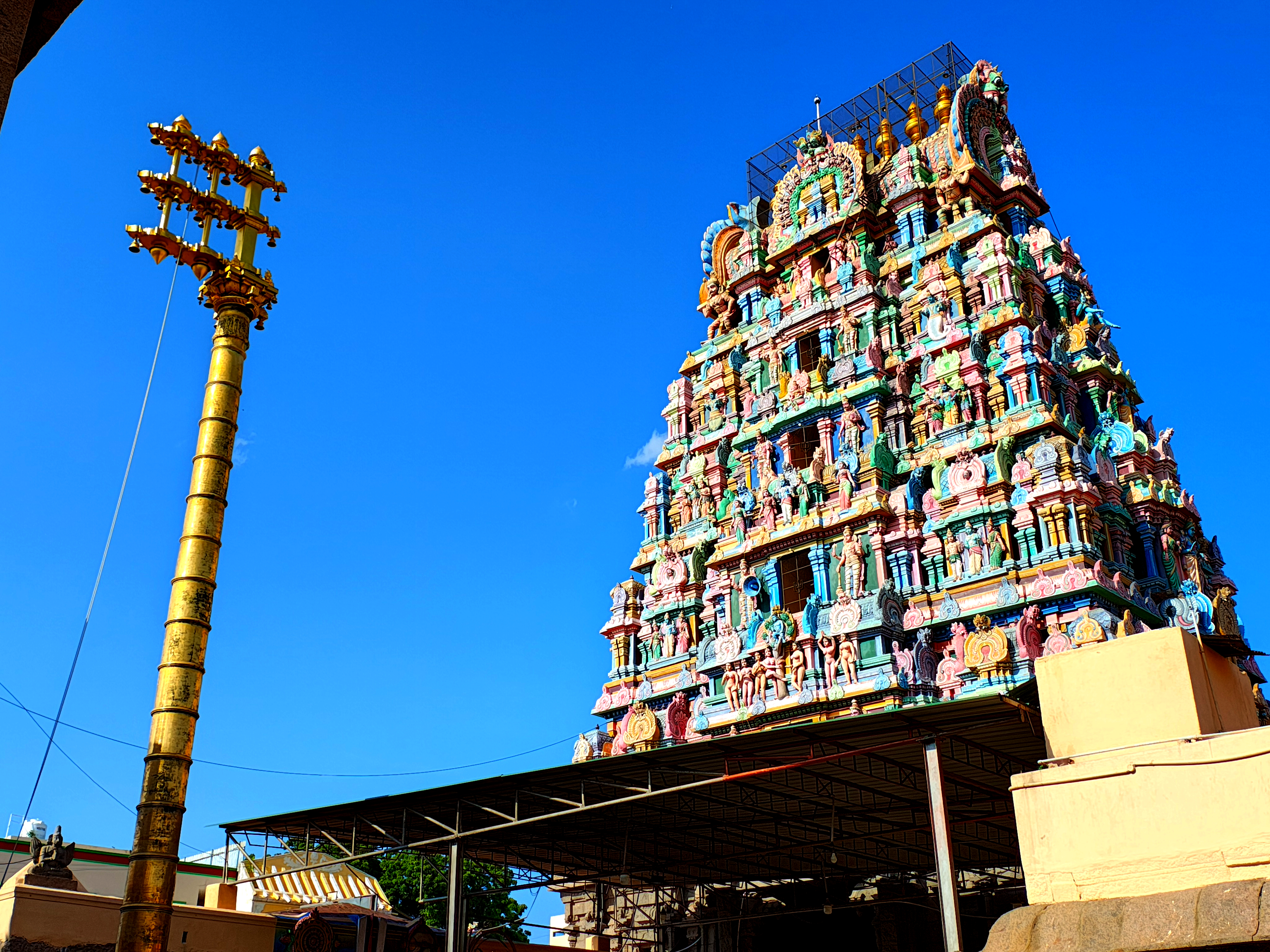
Ramanujar Temple Gopuram from the Inside

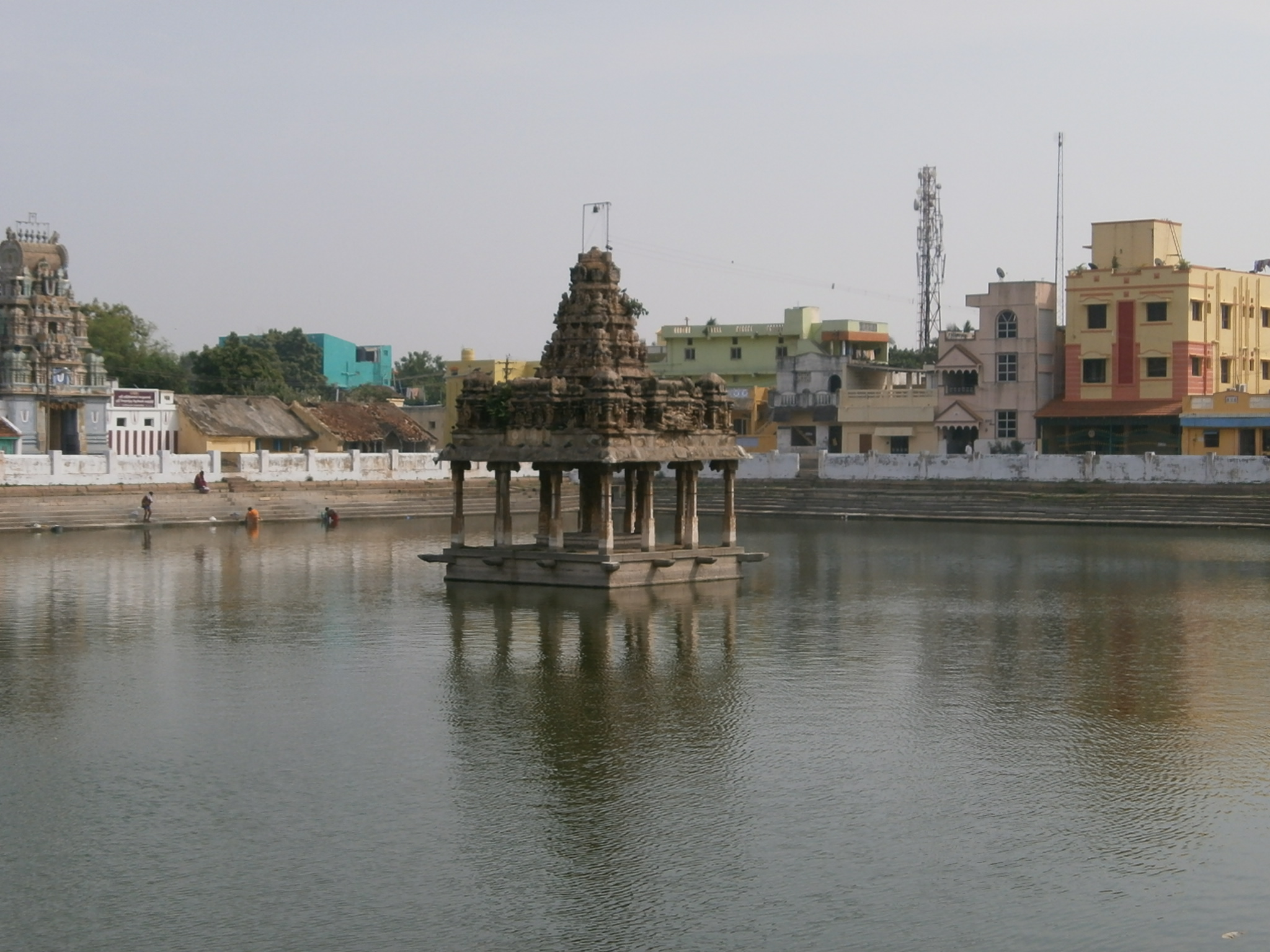
Chittirai Kulam - the temple tank

The temple is built in Dravidian architecture occupies around 1.5 acres (0.61 ha) and has two precincts. It is located in Sriperumbudur, a suburb in Chennai, the capital of the South Indian state of Tamil Nadu. It has features from Chola and Vijayanagara architecture. There are inscriptions from the Vijayanagara Empire dating back to 1572 from the rule of Sriranga I (1572–1586 CE). There is another inscription from the period of Aliya Rama Raya (1542–1565) during 1556 indicating gifts of 36 villages to the temple. The vimana (roof of the sanctum) was gold plated in 1912 and is earliest South Indian temple to have the feature. The plate has the image of Sriramanuja inscribed on it. There is a copper plate recording the history of the gold plate in the temple. The temple has a rectangular plan surrounded by 10 ft (3.0 m) high walls, pierced by a seven-tier gopuram, the gateway tower. The presiding deity is housed in the sanctum and is an image made of granite seen in standing posture. The shrine of Garuda facing Adi Kesava, the vahana of Vishnu, is located axial to the central shrine. The central shrine is approached through a worship hall and a narrow Ardha mandapam. The flagpost is located behind the shrine of Garuda, axial to the central shrine and the gateway tower. There are images of Alvars in the worship hall on both sides and the shrine of Yathiraja Nadhavalli is located on in the second precinct. This is one of the temples where Lakshmi takes the name of a devotee. The gold plated hall in front of the shrine of Ramanuja was endowed by the Maharaja of Mysore. There are no separate Sorgavasal, the sacred entrance way opened during the Vaikunta Ekadasi festival. There is a Bhoodakal hall where the festive images of the presiding deity and is consort are housed during the festival. During 2017, a canal was dug from Sriperumbudur lake to the Madapalli (kitchen) of the temple. The temple tank, Narasimha Kulam was also revived during 2017.

== Worship practices and festivals ==
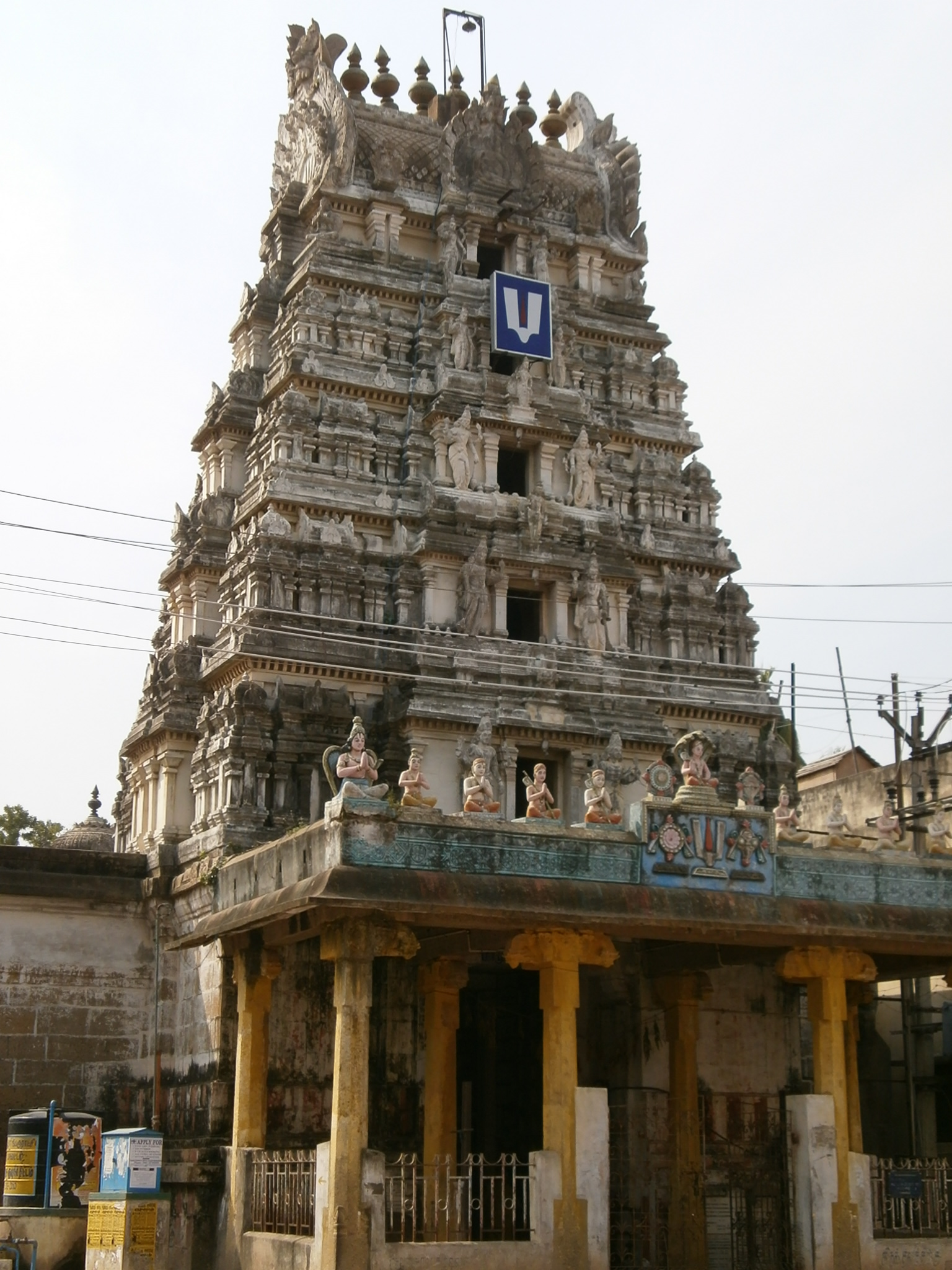
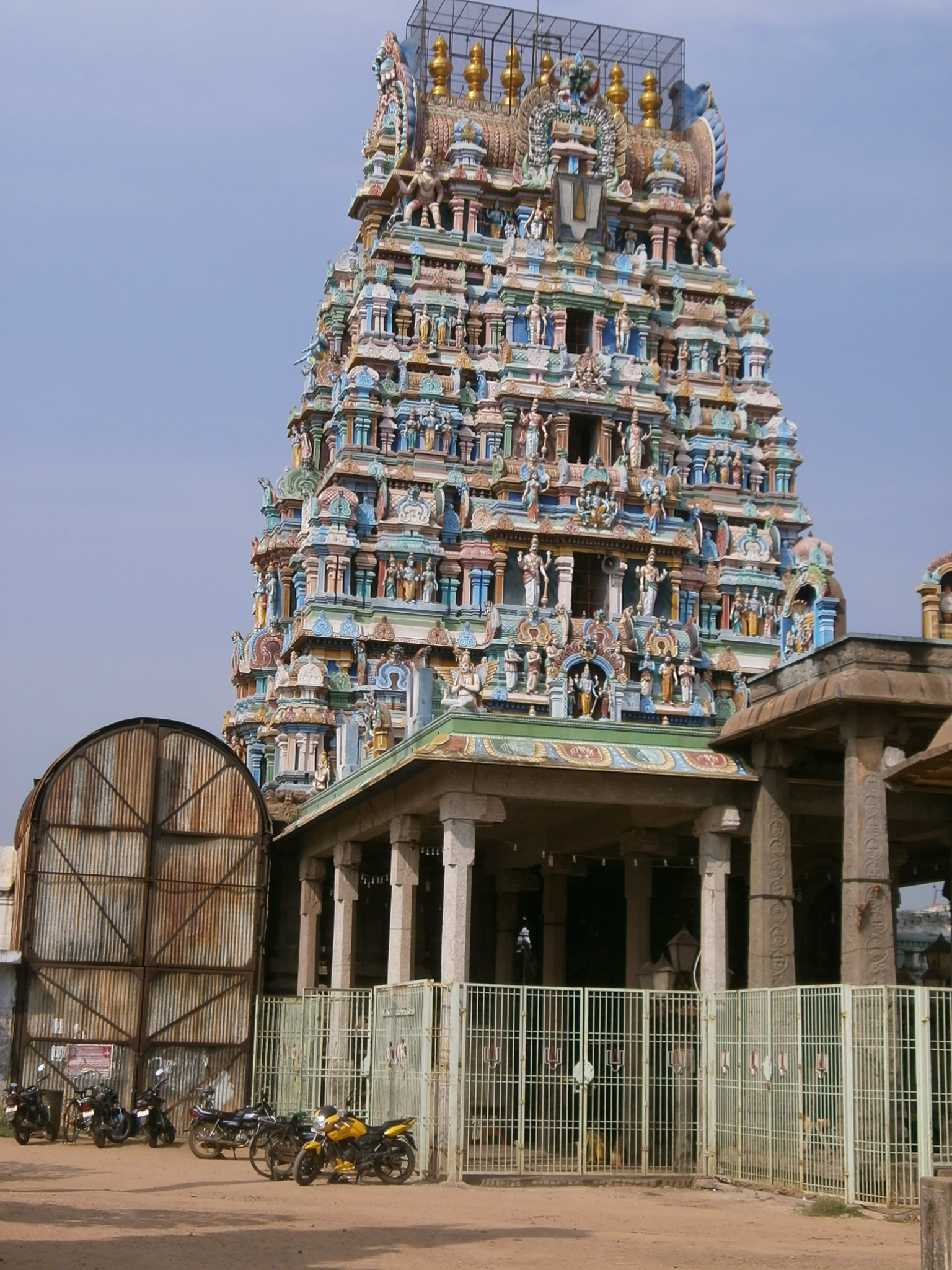
Images of the temple towers

The temple is open from 6:30 a.m. to 12 p.m. and 4:00 p.m. to 8:30 p.m. The temple priests perform the pooja (rituals) during festivals and on a daily basis. As at other Vishnu temples of Tamil Nadu, the priests belong to the Vaishnavaite community, a Brahmin sub-caste. The temple rituals are performed four times a day: Ushathkalam at 8 a.m., Kalasanthi at 10:00 a.m., Sayarakshai at 5:00 p.m. and Ardha Jamam at 7:00 p.m. Each ritual has three steps: alangaram (decoration), neivethanam (food offering) and deepa aradanai (waving of lamps) for both adi kesavan and his consort yathiraja natha valli. There are weekly, monthly and fortnightly rituals performed in the temple.

Various festivals are celebrated in the temple, with the Chitirai Brahmotsavam, Masi Pooram festival during February - March and Panguni Uthiram festival during March - April being the most prominent. During Chittirai Brahmotsavam, the temple car housing the festival deities of Adikesava and Yathiraja natha valli is drawn around the steerts of Sriperumbudur. The festival car was not operational for the 25 years preceding 2003 and was resumed from 2003. The festival is followed by Thiruavadara Utsavam of Ramanuja, the birthday festival of the saint. The temple is maintained and administered by the Hindu Religious and Endowment Board of the Government of Tamil Nadu.
