= Kachabeswarar temple, Thirukachur =

Kachabeswarar Temple
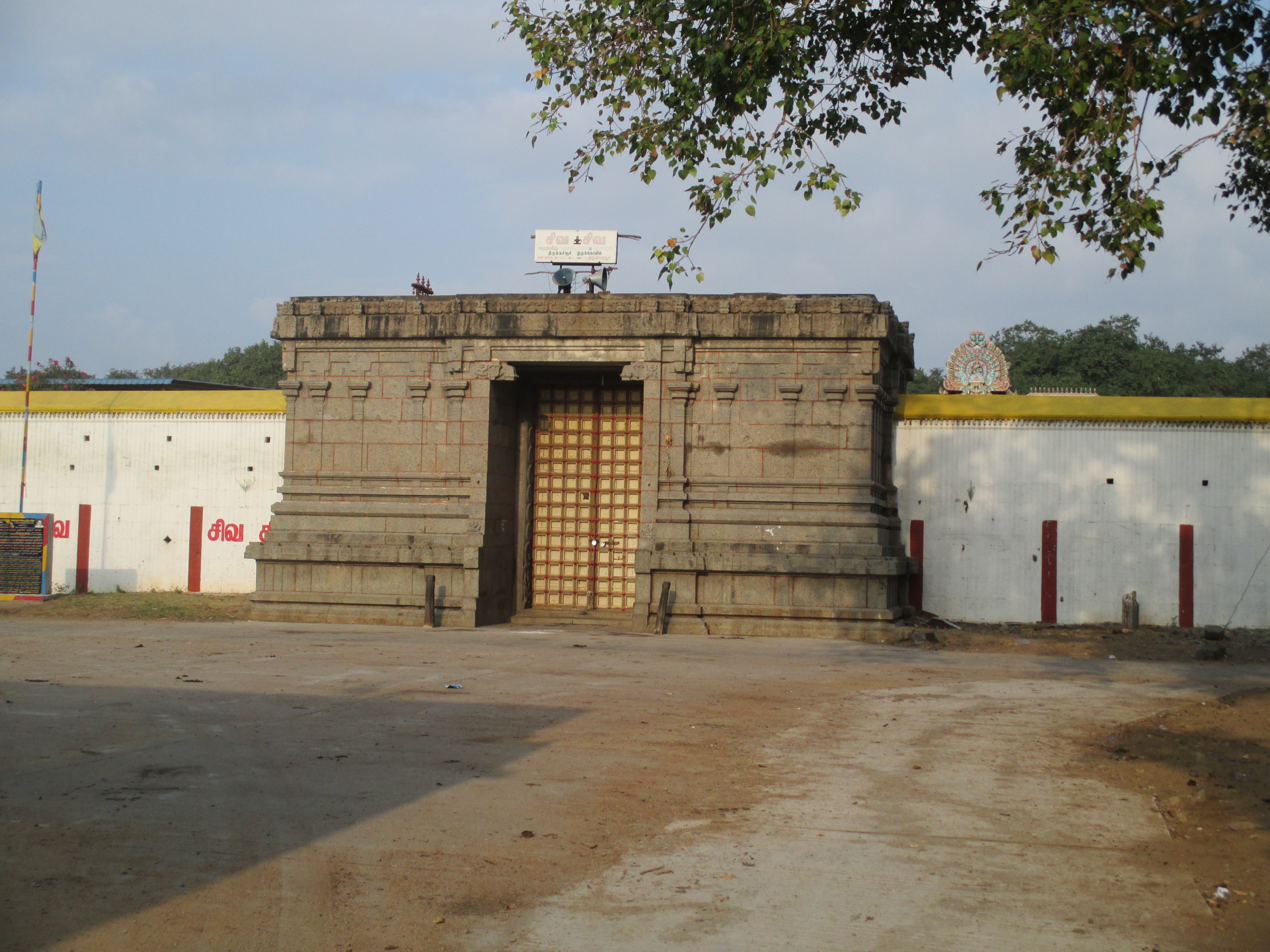

- Location in Tamil Nadu

Religion
- Affiliation: Hinduism
- District: Kanchipuram
- Deity: Kachabeswarar(Shiva)

Location
- State: Tamil Nadu
- Country: India
- Coordinates: 12°46′34″N 79°59′50″E

Architecture
- Type: Thamizhan architecture

Website
- https://www.facebook.com/Thirukachur/

Kachabeswarar Temple, Thirukachur is a Hindu temple dedicated to the deity Shiva, located in Thirukachur, a village in Kanchipuram district in the South Indian state of Tamil Nadu. Shiva is worshipped as Kachabeswarar, and is represented by the lingam. His consort Parvati is depicted as Antanatchi and Kanniyumaiyal. The presiding deity is revered in the 7th-century CE Tamil Saiva canonical work, the Tevaram, written by Tamil saint poets known as the Nayanars and classified as Paadal Petra Sthalam. The temple is counted as a twin temple along with Marundeeswarar Temple located in the same village.

The temple complex covers two acres and the temple tank is located diagonally outside the main gateway. The temple has a number of shrines, with those of Kachabeswarar and his consorts Antanatchi and Kanniyumaiyal, Thiyagarajar and that of Sundarar being offered food by Shiva being the most prominent. All the shrines of the temple are enclosed in large concentric rectangular granite walls. There is a sixteen pillared hall in front of the main tower that has sculpted columns depicting various legends and Hindu deities.

The original complex is believed to have been built by Cholas, while the present masonry structure was built during the Nayak during the 16th century. In modern times, the temple is maintained and administered by the Hindu Religious and Charitable Endowments Department of the Government of Tamil Nadu.

== Legend ==
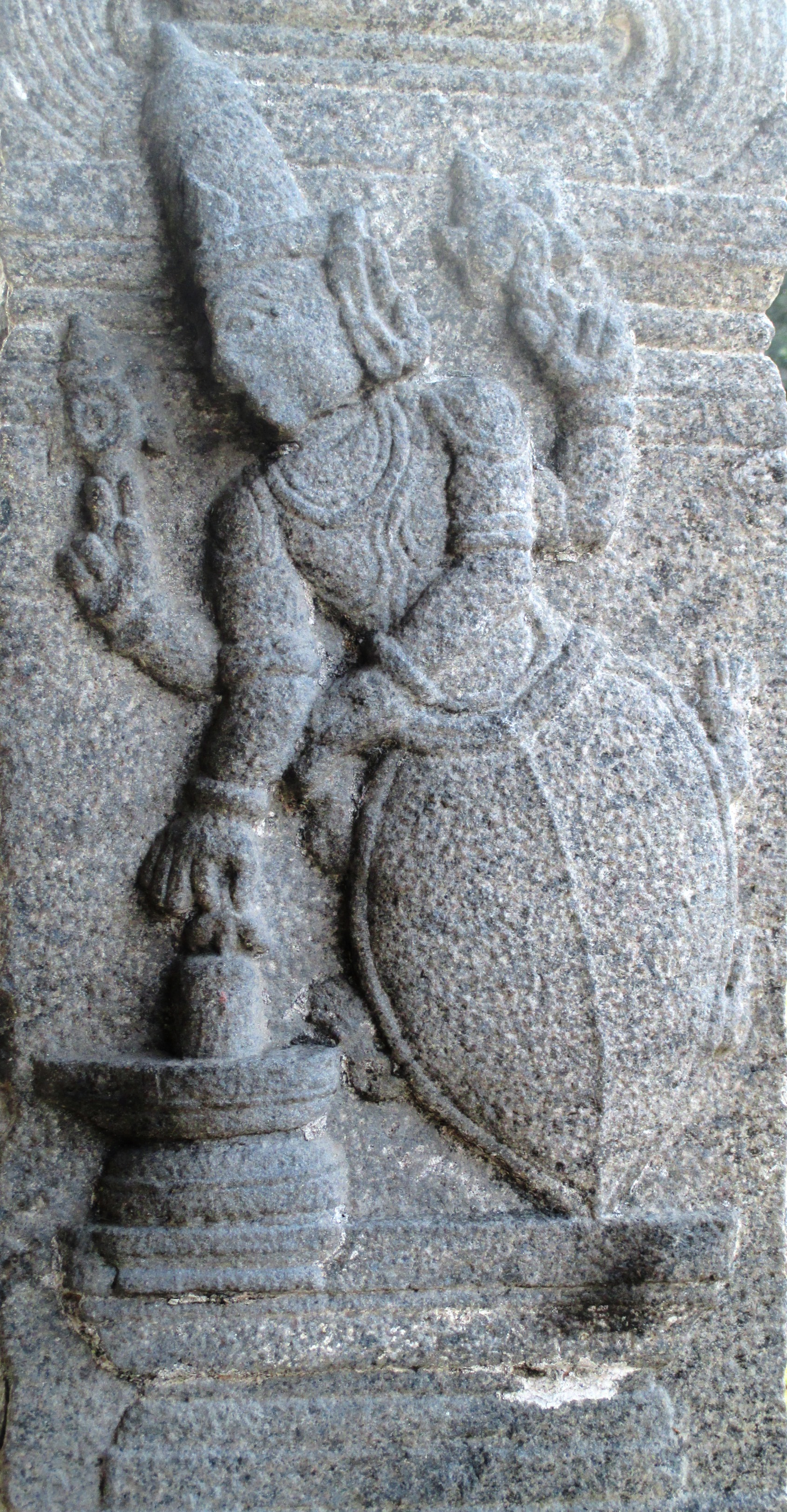
Vishnu in the form of tortoise worshiping Shiva

As per Hindu legend, Vishnu in the form of tortoise (called Karkada) worshiped Shiva to attain divine ambrosia at this place. On account of the legend, the place was called Kascapavoor, which went on to become Kachoor and the presiding deity, Shiva came to be known as Karchabeswarar. As per another legend, Vishnu appeared in the form of Kurma appeared from the Ocean of Milk to help the Devas. Vishnu appeared in this place, created a spring, bathed and prayed to Shiva at this place. Since Shiva helped Vishnu, the place came to be known as Tirukachur. As per a third legend, Indra, the king of celestial deities got a disease which could not be cured by the physicians of the celestial world. The Ashwini Devas of the celestial world also could not cure the disease. With the help of sage Narada who advised them to worship Shiva, they were able to find the herbs in earth that could cure the disease. Indra was cured with the herb, but they were not able to find the place where they found the herb in earth. They prayed to Parvati who appeared in the place in the form of Irulneeki Amman (the one who cleared darkness) and directed them the place. The temple has a recorded history from the 10th century, but scholar attribute the presence of the temple at least from the 8th century, pertaining to the period of Sundarar, the famous Saiva Nayanar. Sundarar has glorified the temple in his verses in 11th Thirumurai of Thevaram.

== Architecture ==
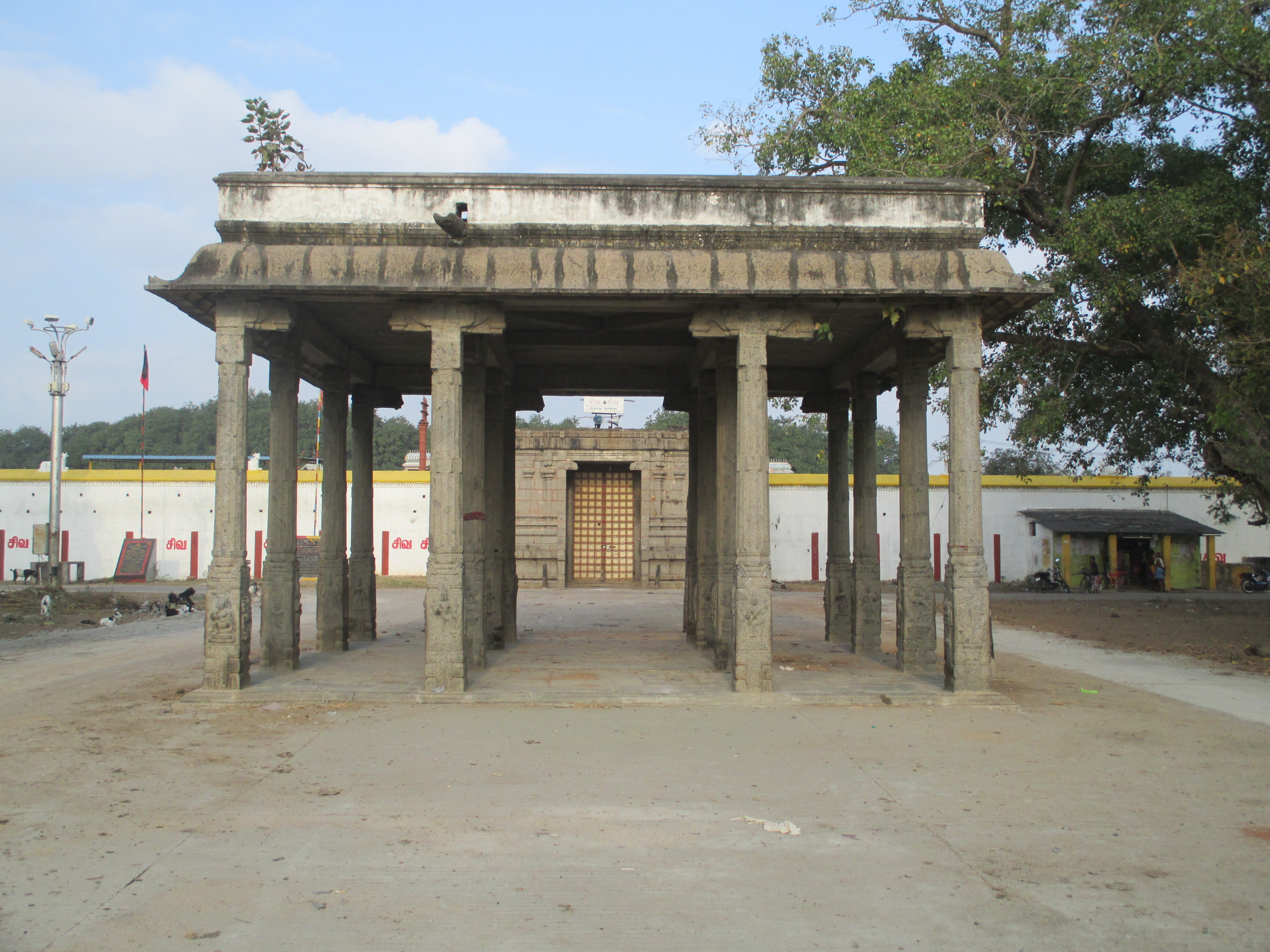
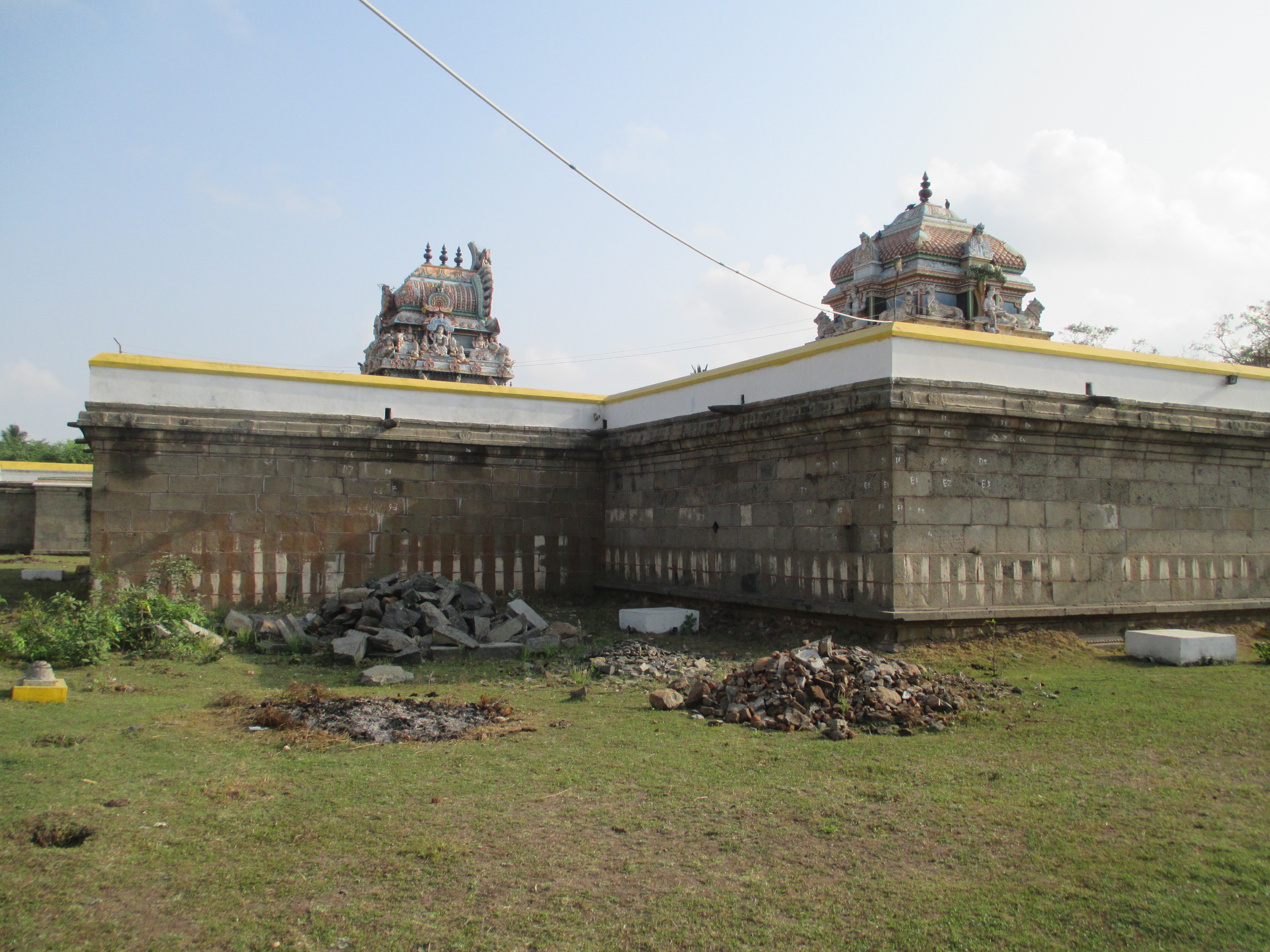
The shrines of the temple

The temple has a flat gateway tower and all the shrines of the temple are enclosed in concentric rectangular granite walls. There is a sixteen pillar hall in front the gateway that has sculpted pillars dating back to the 16th century. The temple occupies an area of around 2 acres (0.81 ha). The temple tank is located adjacent to the sixteen pillared hall. The central shrine houses the image of Kachabeswarar in the form of Lingam. The shrine of Irulneeki Thayar (also called Anthaga Nivarini, facing West is located in the Mahamandapam leading to the sanctum. The central shrine is approached through the shrine of Thyagaraja located adjacent to the sanctum. As in other Shiva temples in Tamil Nadu, the shrines of Vinayaka, Murugan, Navagraha, Chandikesa and Durga are located around the precinct of the main shrine. There is a shrine depicting Shiva offering food to Sundarar on the Western side. The sanctum is approached through a side entrance. The sanctum is in the form of a moat. The first precinct around the sanctum has the images of Vinayaka, Surya, various images of Nagalinga, Valli Deivanai, Subramanya, Nataraja, images of Nalvar. The shrine of Amman is a West facing shrine where the deity Anjanatchiamman is sported in standing posture. The original complex is believed to have been built by Cholas, while the present masonry structure was built during the Nayak during the 16th century. In modern times, the temple is maintained and administered by the Hindu Religious and Charitable Endowments Department of the Government of Tamil Nadu.

== Religious importance ==
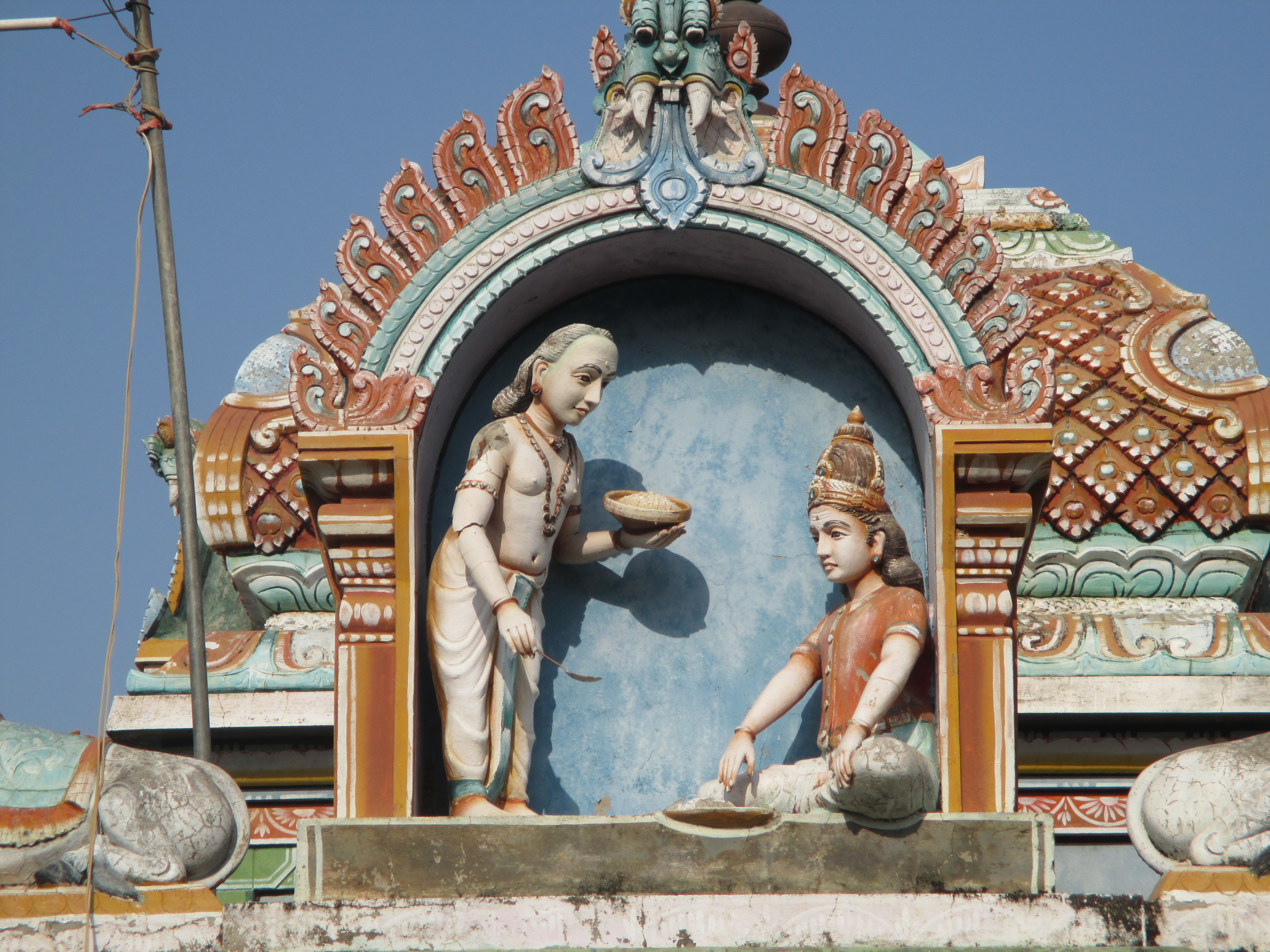
A stucco image indicating the legend of Shiva feeding Sundarar

It is one of the shrines of the 275 Paadal Petra Sthalams - Shiva Sthalams glorified in the early medieval Tevaram poems by Tamil Saivite Nayanars Sundarar. As per Hindu legend, Sundarar, while traveling through the place became very hungry. Shiva appeared and fed Sundarar. Sundarar has made a mention of the event, calling the deity as Kachabeswarar, Virundeeswarar and Iranthittai Eswarar. The temple is one of the major temples in the Thondai region having the images of Thyagaraja and called Amudha Thyagesar.

== See also ==
- Marundeeswarar Temple, Thirukachur
- Padalathri temple
