= Padalathri Narasimhar Temple =

Hindu temple

Padalathri Narasimhar temple
- Singaperumalkovil
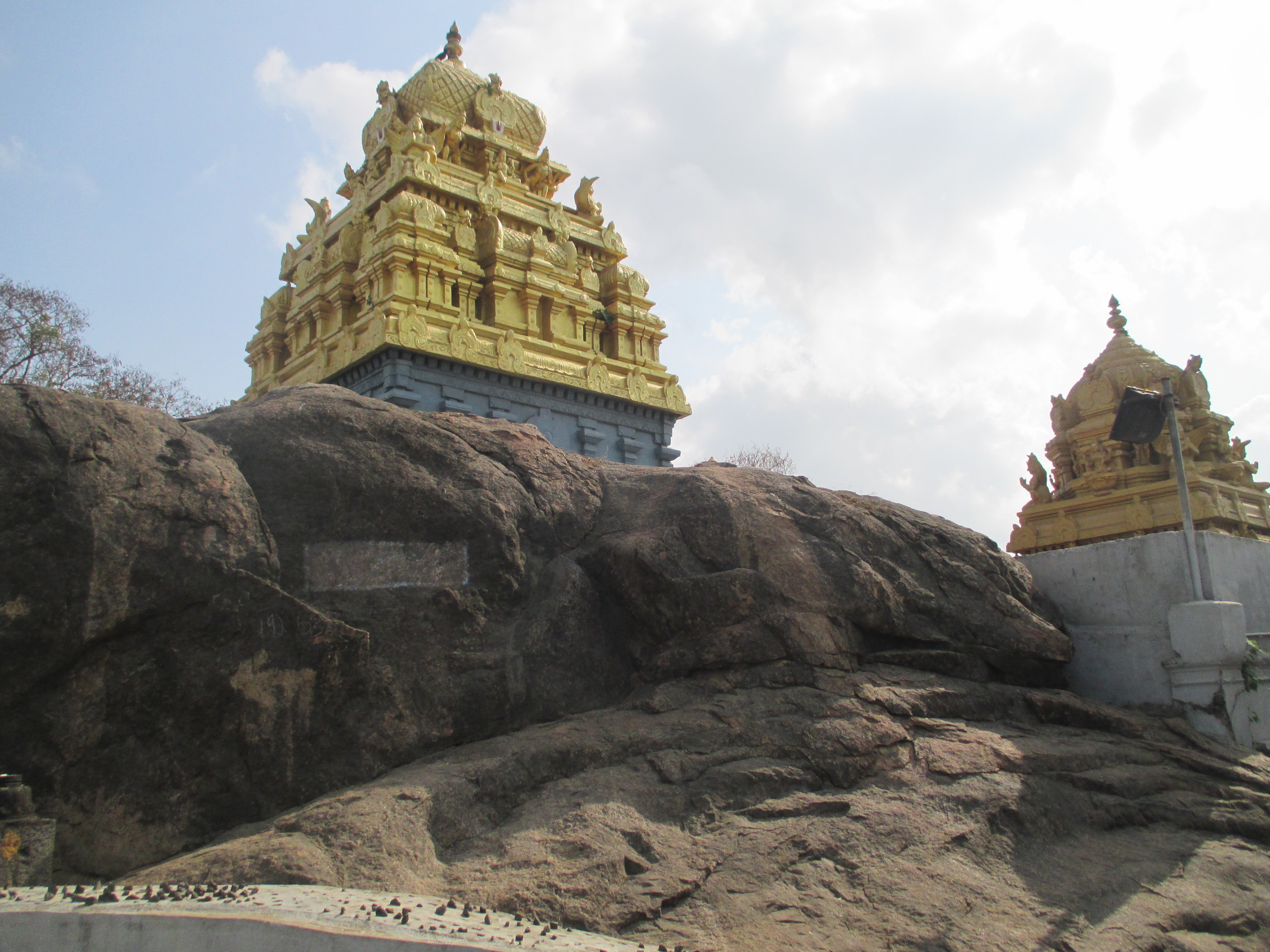

- Location in Tamil Nadu

Religion
- Affiliation: Hinduism
- District: Chengalpattu
- Deity: Padalathri Narasimhar (Vishnu); Ahobilavalli (Lakshmi)
- Festivals: Chittirai Brahmotsavam; Pavithrotsavam; Theppotsavam; Narasimhar Jayanthi

Location
- Location: Singaperumalkoil, Chennai
- State: Tamil Nadu
- Country: India
- Interactive map of Padalathri Narasimhar temple
- Coordinates: 12°45′37.2″N 80°00′17.5″E

Architecture
- Type: Pallava Architecture
- Elevation: 60.76 m (199 ft)

The Padalathri Narasimhar Temple or Narasimhar Temple (also called Singaperumal Koil) is dedicated to the Hindu god Vishnu (Narasimha) in Singaperumal Koil, near Chennai City, in the South Indian state of Tamil Nadu. Constructed as rock-cut architecture, it is dedicated to Vishnu, who is worshipped as Narasimha, and his consort Lakshmi as Ahobilavalli. The temple was built by the Pallavas during the 8th century. Earlier in Kanchipuram district, it is now under Chengalpattu district. The temple is classified asaone mong the 108 Abhimana Kshethrams of the Vaishnava tradition.

The temple is maintained and administered by the Hindu Religious and Endowment Board of the Government of Tamil Nadu.

== Legend ==
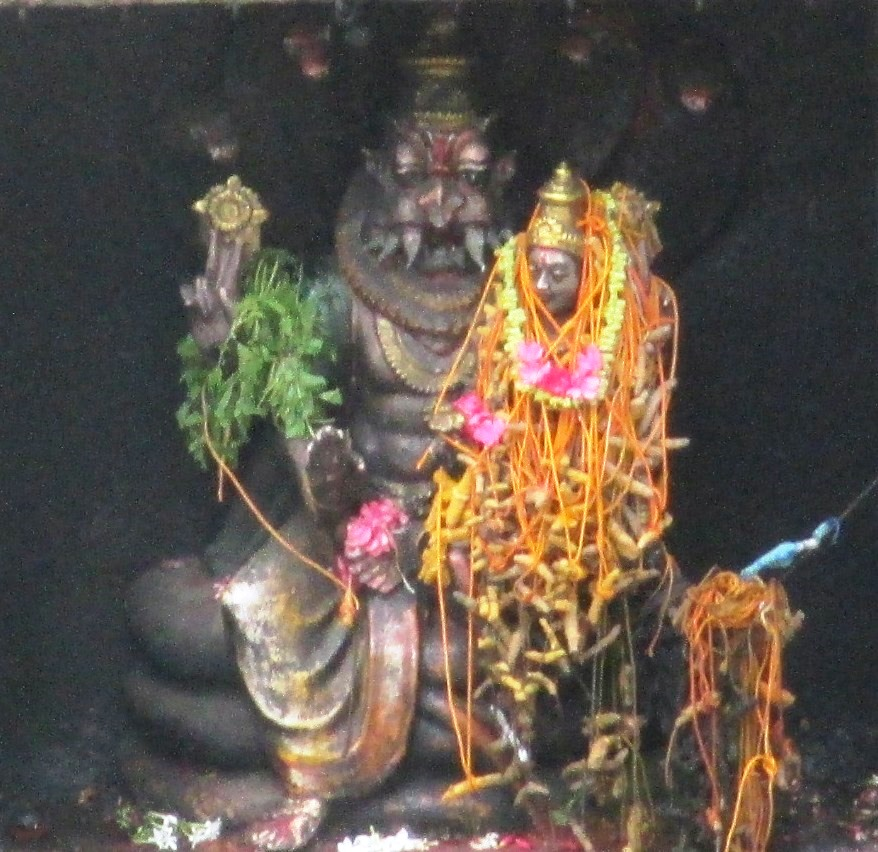
Image of Narsimha with Lakshmi on his lap

According to the Hindu legend, Singaperumal Kovil is referred by a Sanskrit Padalathri. The temple finds mention in Brahmanda Purana, which mentions that Vishnu appeared as Narasimha to the sages performing penance at this place after killing the asura king Hiranyakashipu. Hiranyakashipu was troubling the devas and devis as he got a boon from Brahma, that neither human nor an animal could kill him. His son Prahlada was an ardent devotee of Vishnu, which Hiranyakashipu discouraged. He also tried to slay Prahlada by various means, but was saved by the divine grace of Vishnu. Vishnu took the avatar of Narasimha and appeared from a pillar. Narasimha, as a lion-man deity, caught Hiranyakashipu and Narasimha killed Hiranyakashipu on an evening time in a doorway, which was neither land nor air. His anger was not quenched even after slaying the asura king, but Prahlada sang and prayed Narasimha to calm down, which he acceded to. He is also believed to have quenched his anger by bathing at the temple tank in this place. The water is believed to have turned red after the incident.

== History ==
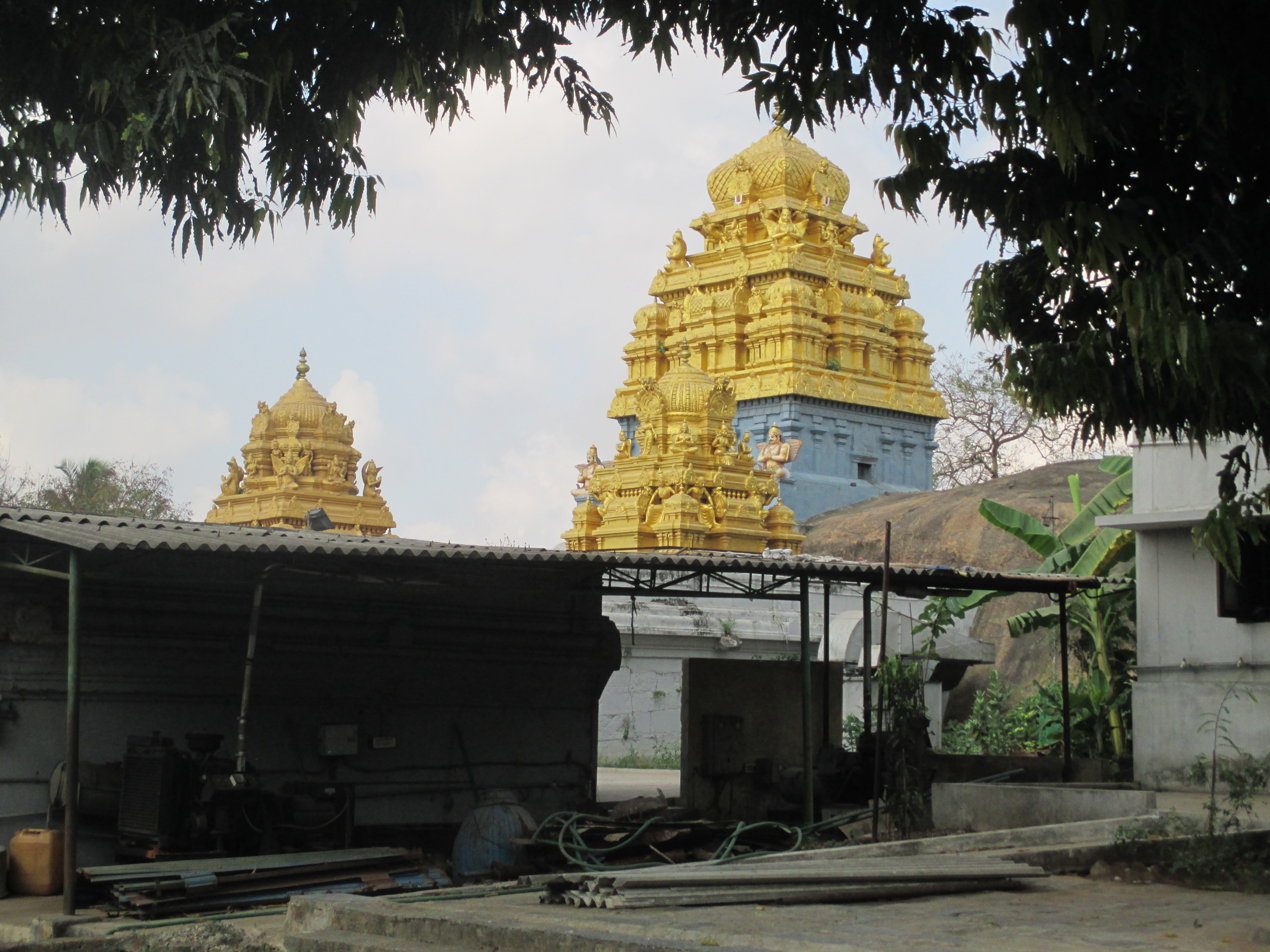
Narasimha temple towers.

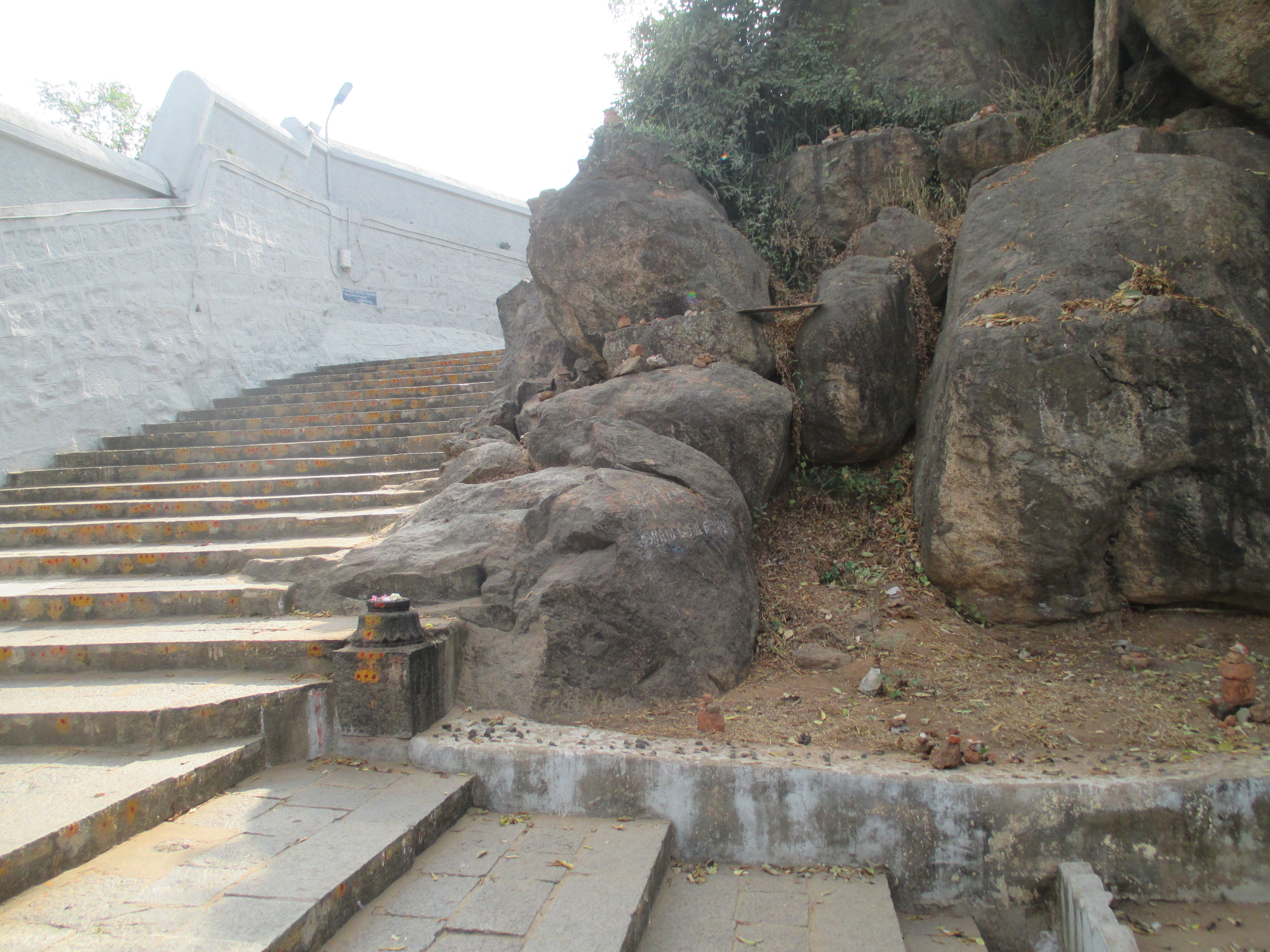
Steps leading up the hill to reach the Narasimha temple.

Singaperumal Kovil was originally called by various names like Alvar Narasingadevar, and Narsinga Vinnagar Alvar. The original temple is believed to have been built in Rock-cut architecture by the Pallavas, who built cave temples of similar kind in the area. The inscriptions on the walls of the temple are from the Chola regime during the 10th–11th centuries CE. The inscriptions are made in Grantha Lipi, Thamizhi and few in telugu. The oldest inscription is found from the period of Raja Raja Chola (985–1014 CE), the most famous Chola emperor from Thanjavur in 990 CE indicating a gift of 26 sheep for producing ghee for the perpetual lighting of the temple by oil lamps. Another inscription from Andal shrine is mutilated, but indicates a gift by an individual to the presiding deity. The third inscription is mutilated, presumably from the 11th century indicating gifts to the temple.

== Architecture ==
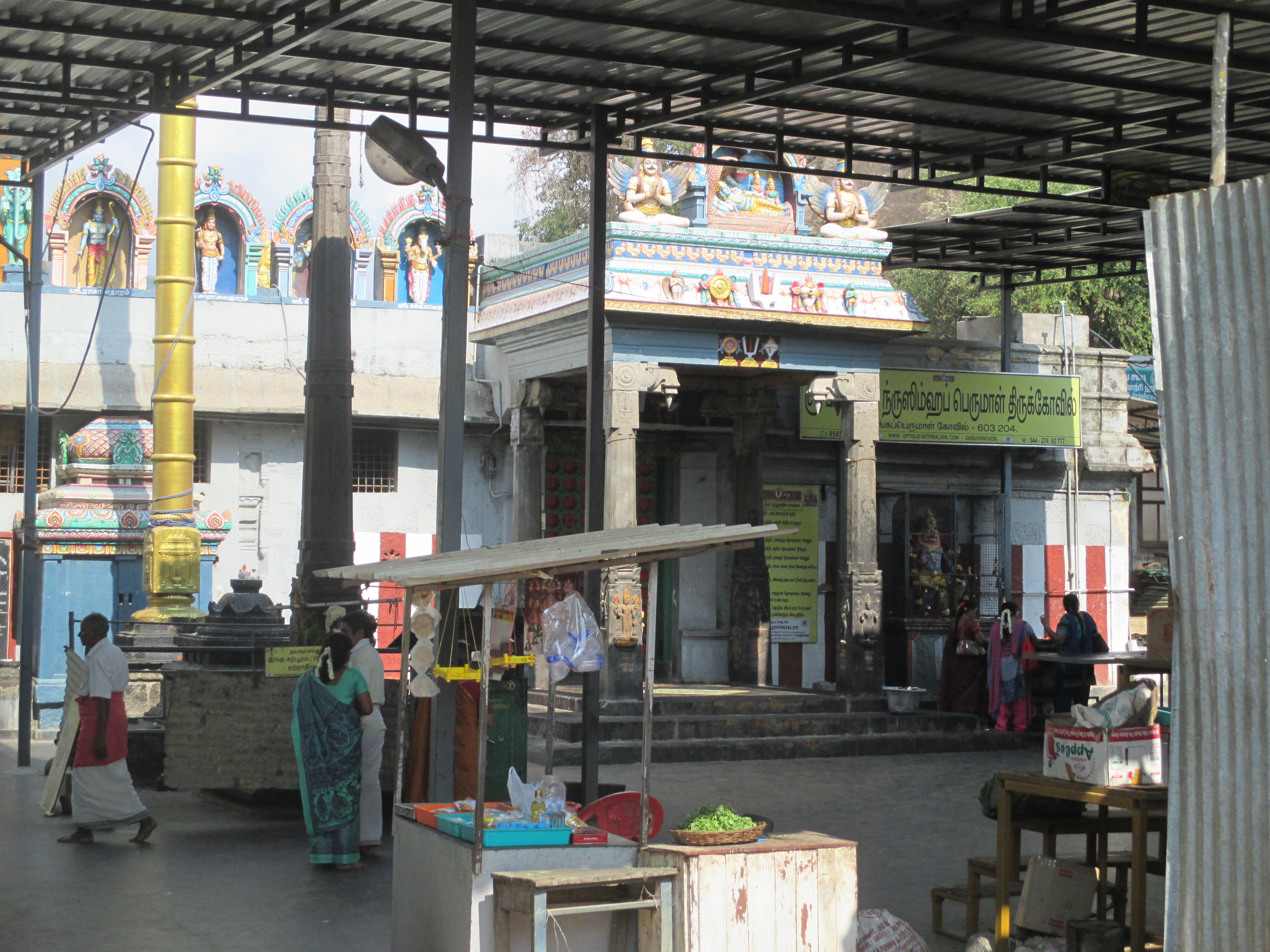
Inner Prāhāram (near Paramapada Entrance)

The temple is built in Rock-cut architecture, occupies around 1.5 acres (0.61 ha) and has two precincts. It is located in Singaperumal Koil, a suburb located 45 km (28 mi) from Chennai, the capital of the South Indian state of Tamil Nadu. The presiding deity housed in the sanctum in a cave is a rock-cut image, in seated posture with his right leg bent and left leg left hanging. Narasimha has four hands with two of the top hands holding his Conch and Chakra, while the other two hands showing Abaya Mudra and Uru hasta (resting on his lap). Ugra Narasimha is sported with a third eye on his forehead, which is usually a feature of Shiva. The sanctum is guarded by two Dvarapalas image on either sides. The shrine of his consort, Ahobilavalli is located in the second precinct, which is believed to be a later addition. There is a shrine of Andal located to the right of the sanctum. While the two shrines of Ahobilavalli and Andal have precincts, unlike the shrine of Narasimhar.

The shrine of Garuda facing Narasimhar, the eagle mount of Vishnu, is located axial to the central shrine. The central shrine is approached through Mahamandapa, the worship hall and a narrow Ardha mandapam. The flagpost is located behind the shrine of Garuda, axial to the central shrine and the gateway tower. There are images of Alvars in the worship hall on both sides and the shrine of Ahobilavalli is located in the second precinct. The vimana, the roof over the sanctum, has stucco images of various avatars of Vishnu. There are separate shrines of Lakshmi Narasimha, Ramanuja, Manavala Mamunigal, and Vishvaksena.

== Festivals ==
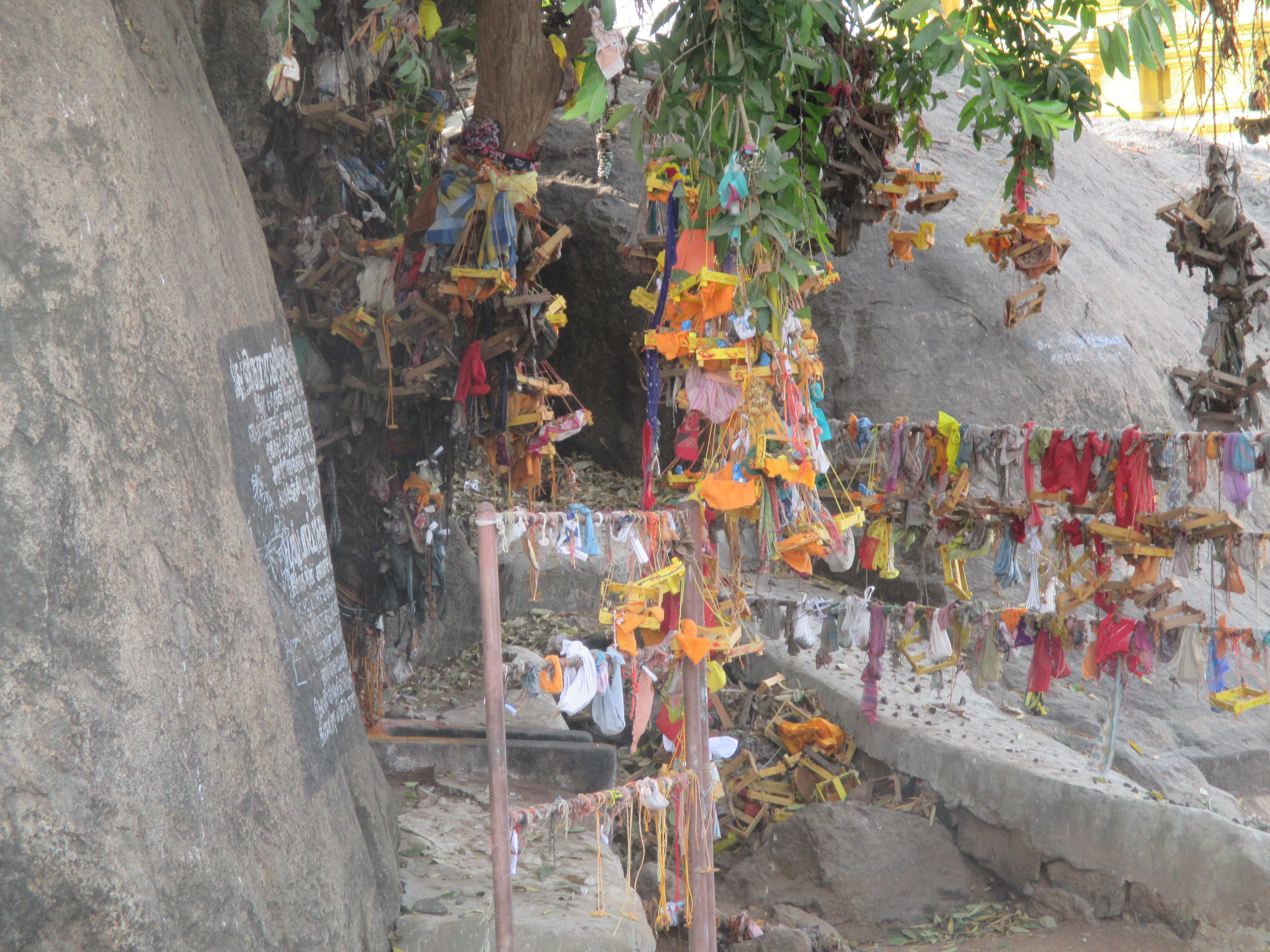
Temple tree

Various festivals are celebrated in the temple, with the Chittirai Brahmotsavam during April–May, Narasimha Jayanthi, Pavithra Utsavam during Aani (June–July) and Maasi float festival during February–March being the most prominent. During Aani Brahmotsavam, the temple car housing the festival deities of Narasimhar and Ahobilavalli is drawn around the streets of Singaperumalkoil. During the float festival in February–March, the presiding deities are drawn in a float in the temple tank. There are festivals almost every month in the temple. The temple is maintained and administered by the Hindu Religious and Endowment Board of the Government of Tamil Nadu.

== See also ==
- Lakshmi-Narasimha
- Thirukachur Marundeeswarar Temple
- Thirukachur Kachabeswarar Temple
