= Sriperumbudur =

Town in Tamil Nadu, India

Sriperumbudur Thiruperumbudur
- Town
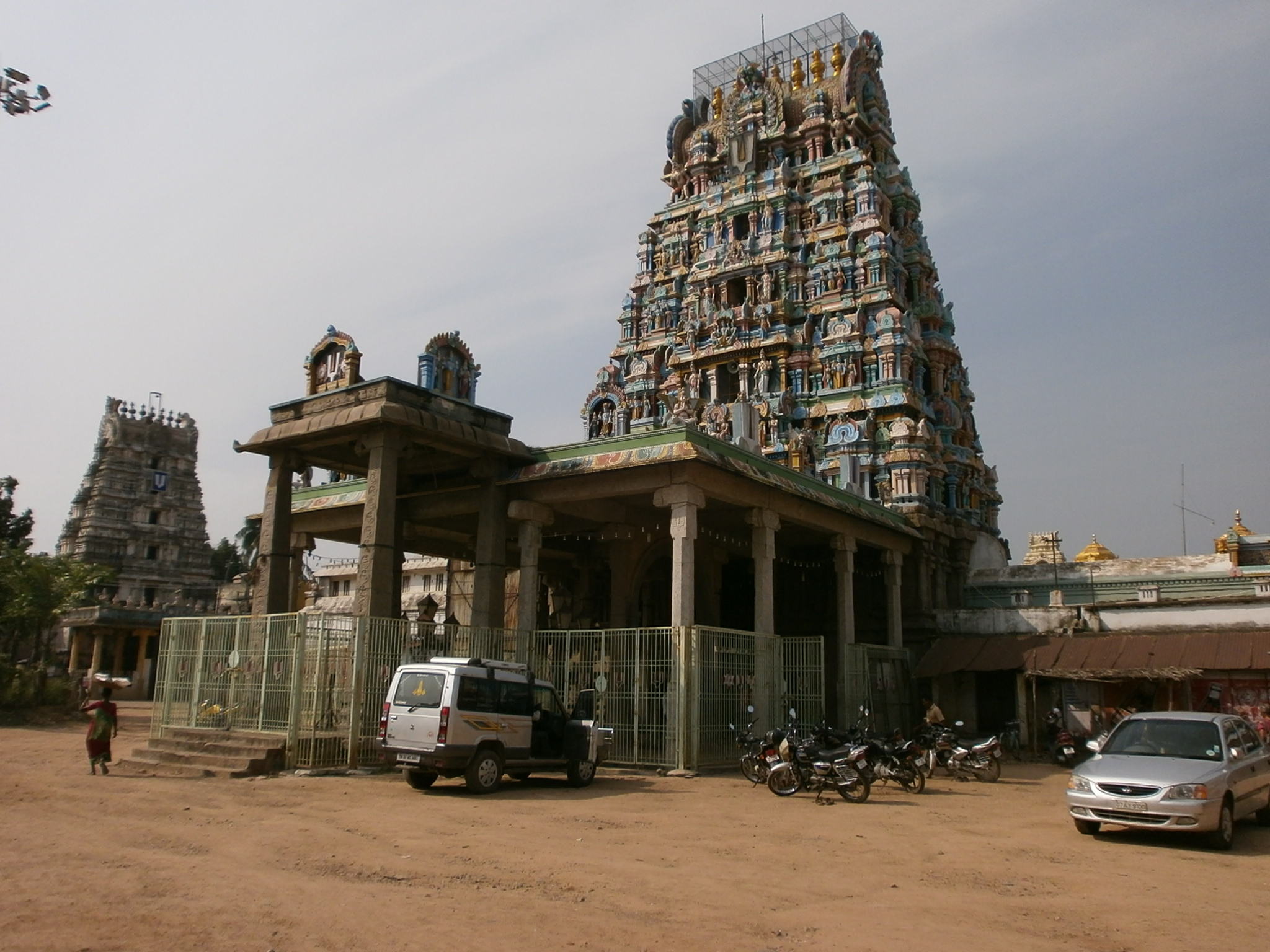

- Thiruperumputhoor (Tamil Nadu) Sriperumbudur (India)
- Coordinates: 12°58′00″N 79°56′42″E
- Country: India
- State: Tamil Nadu
- District: Kanchipuram
- Established: 1983

Government
  - Type: Municipality

Area
  - Total: 19.39 km^{2} (7.49 sq mi)
- Elevation: 66 m (217 ft)

Population (2011)
  - Total: 24,864
  - Density: 1,282/km^{2} (3,321/sq mi)

Languages
  - Official: Tamil
- Time zone: UTC+5:30 (IST)
- Postal code: 602105
- Vehicle registration: TN-87 And TN-21

Sriperumbudur, also known as Thiruperumbudur, is a town located in Kanchipuram district of the Indian state of Tamil Nadu. Located 40 kilometers southwest of the capital city of Chennai on the National Highway 4, it falls under the Chennai Metropolitan Area.

== Geography ==
=== Geology ===
Sriperumbudur belongs to the Sriperumbudur Formation, which is characterised by arenaceous and argillaceous rock units composed of splintery green shale, clays, and sandstones with ironstone intercalation. The rock units conformably overlie either the Precambrian basement or Precambrian boulder beds and green shales. The beds contain marine intercalations. Their lithologic suites and fossil fauna are suggestive of deposition under shallow and brackish conditions, probably close to the shoreline.

== Demographics ==
Sriperumbudur has a population of 24,864, according to the 2011 Census of India, with 12,753 males and 12,111 females. The projected population for 2023 is 34,100.

== Government and politics ==
The Sriperumbudur assembly constituency is one of 234 constituencies represented in Tamil Nadu's State Legislative assembly. It is also represented as Sriperumbudur Lok Sabha Constituency in Lok Sabha, the lower house of the Indian Parliament. The current Member of Parliament from the constituency is T R Baalu from the Dravida Munnetra Kazhagam (DMK).

The Kanchipuram Regional Transport Office (RTO) has a unit office in Sriperumbudur.

== Economy ==
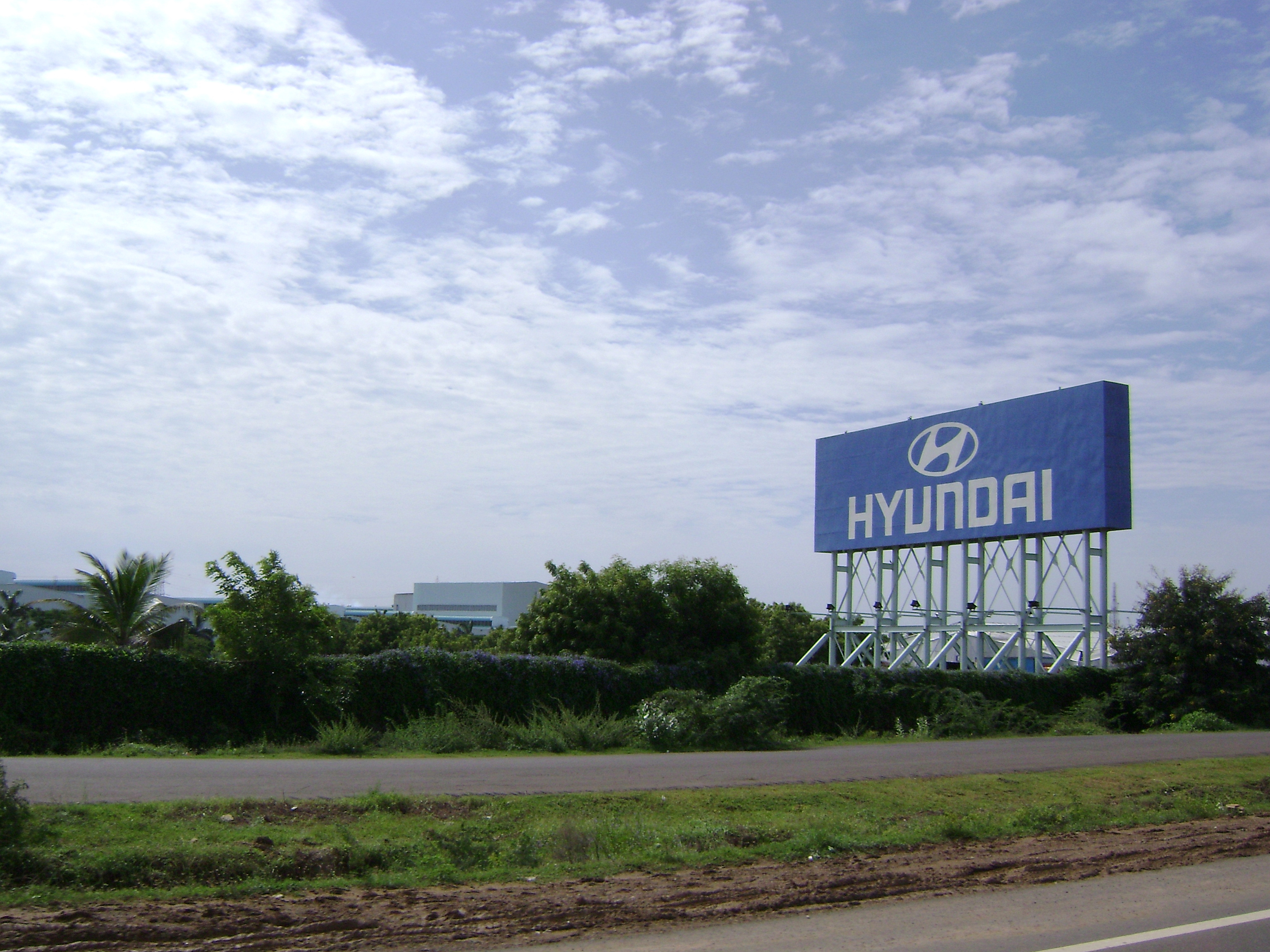
Hyundai's manufacturing plant at Irungattukottai near Sriperumbudur.

Sriperumbudur has attracted huge investments due to several factors:

- proximity to Chennai port
- strategic location on the Chennai-Bangalore highway
- infrastructure development
- establishment of Software Technology Parks
- availability of quality workforce

In 1999, Hyundai, one of the initial investors, arrived at Sriperumbudur. By 2008, Sriperumbudur had become a special economic zone with over US$2 billion invested by companies primarily in the automotive and electronics sectors.

A new greenfield Chennai Airport is planned for Sriperumbudur. The Industrial corridor between Sriperumbudur and Oragadam is rapidly growing with apartment complexes by large developers such as KumarRaja Foundations, Arun Excello and Hiranandani.

=== Companies in Sriperumbudur ===
The following companies have established operations in Sriperumbudur:

- BMW
- BYD Auto
- AIS Glass – Automotive Glass
- CAPARO engineering India Ltd.
- Dell
- Flextronics
- Ford
- Foxconn
- Jabil
- Lenovo
- Mitsubishi
- Motorola
- Nissan
- Royal Enfield
- Saint-Gobain
- Salcomp
- Samsung
- Sanmina-SCI
- YAMAHA motors Pvt ltd.
- YCH

== Places of interest ==
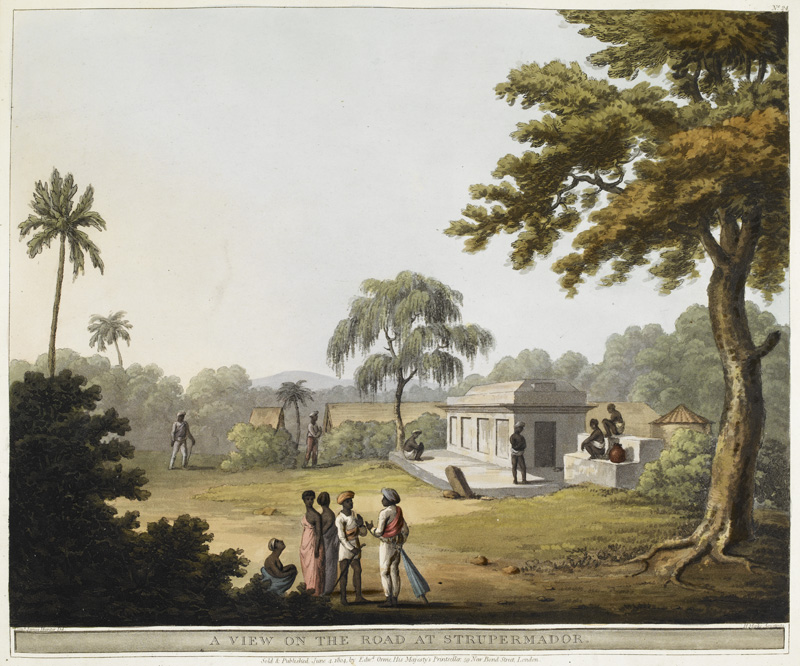
A view on the road at Strupermador, by James Hunter.

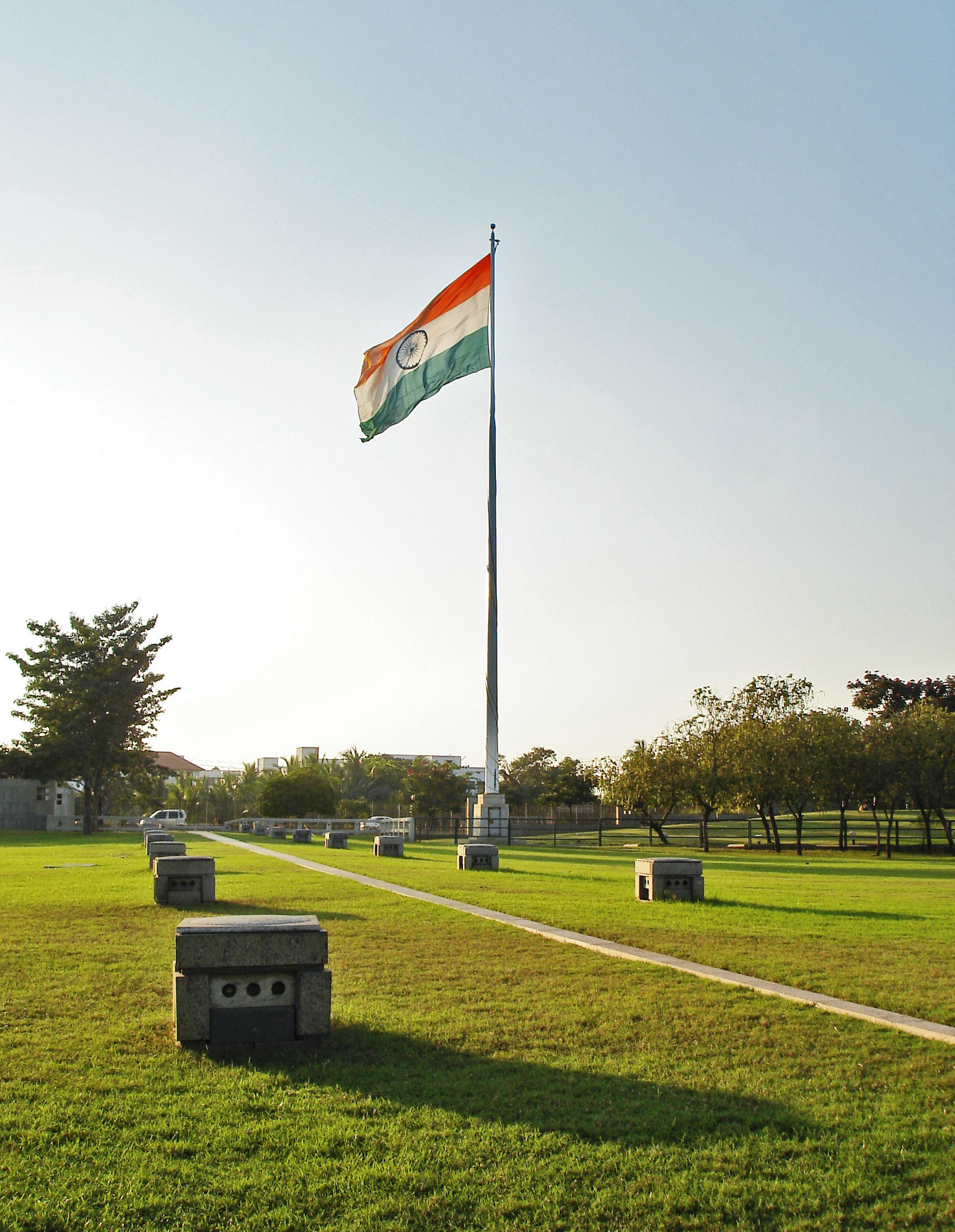
The Rajiv Gandhi Memorial

=== Adikesava Perumal temple ===
The Adikesava Perumal Temple is the birthplace of Ramanuja, a Hindu saint and a major proponent of the Sri Vaishnavism tradition. In the months of April and May, the temple celebrates a chariot festival.

=== Rajiv Gandhi Memorial ===
The Rajiv Gandhi Memorial is a memorial to former Indian Prime Minister Rajiv Gandhi at the site where he was assassinated. The Memorial was dedicated to the nation by the then President of India A. P. J. Abdul Kalam in 2003.

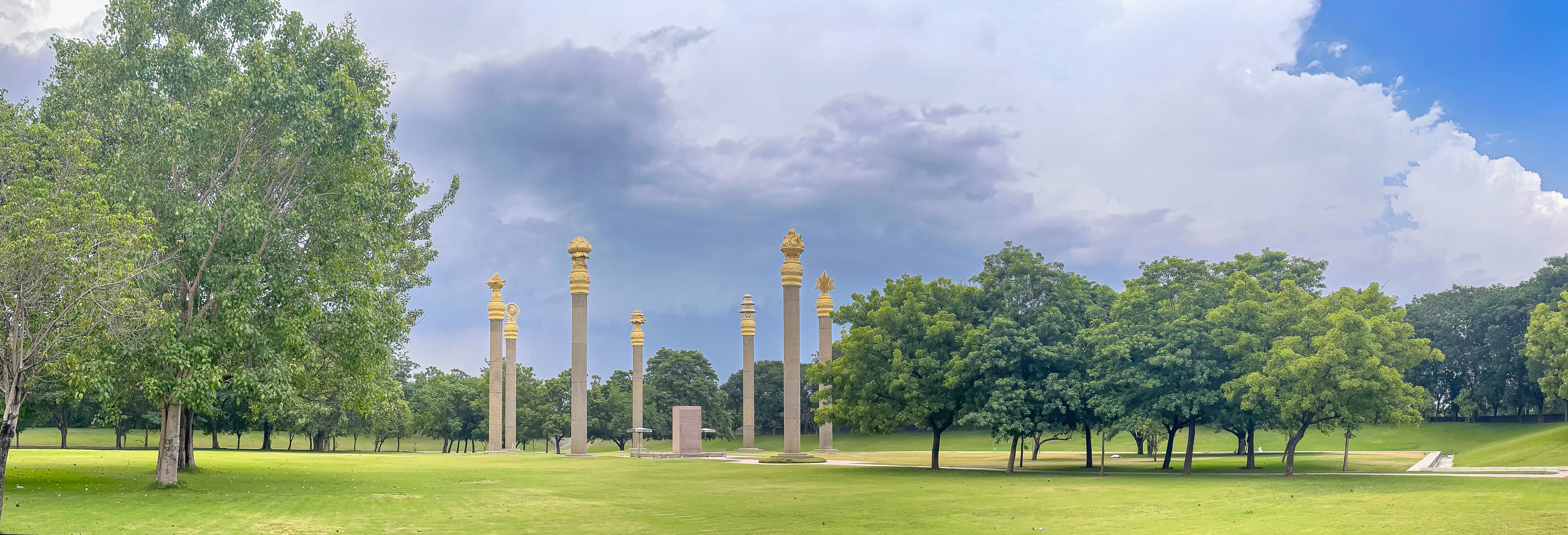
A Panoramic view of Rajiv Gandhi Memorial

=== Rajiv Gandhi National Institute of Youth Development ===
The Rajiv Gandhi National Institute of Youth Development, Sriperumbudur, is an Institution of National Importance by the Act of Parliament No. 35/2012 under the Ministry of Youth Affairs & Sports, Government of India. The RGNIYD offers academic programs at the postgraduate level in youth development, engages in research in youth development, and coordinates training programs for state agencies and the officials of youth organizations. The institute was established in 1993 with a focus on youth development and empowerment.

=== Vallakottai Murugan temple ===
The Vallakottai Murugan temple, located 9 km from Sriperumbudur, is known for the tallest Murugan statue in India (9 metres [30 feet]).

=== Madras Motor Sports Club ===
Madras Motor Sports Club, located at the village of Irungattukottai near Sriperumbudur, organises world class racing events every year, including the South India Rally and the All India Motor Race Meet. Fédération Internationale de Motocyclisme (FIM) and the Fédération Internationale du Sport Automobile (FISA) have licensed the club for races up to Formula Three for cars and all classes for motorcycles. The club also has a dirt track for autocross events.

=== JKDR SPORTS ===
The JKDR SPORTS is a multi-sport club to motivate players in rural area in and around Sengadu village. Players from Tiruvallur and Sriperumbudur can utilise this club. The sport center aims to deliver more training, sport and physical activity opportunities for all levels of children and adults to help them engage in a healthy lifestyle. Players can play shuttle badminton, table tennis, carrom, chess and use basic gym tools. Tournaments are being conducted every month to cheer the players. Located near Hyundai Hysco – Sengadu.

=== Marine Fossil Park ===
Gunduperumbedu, a village in Sriperumbudur Taluk, is known for marine fossils. The fossils here are between 100 and 300 million years old.
