= Singaperumalkoil =

Singaperumal Koil Singaperumal Kovil Singai
- Suburb of Chennai
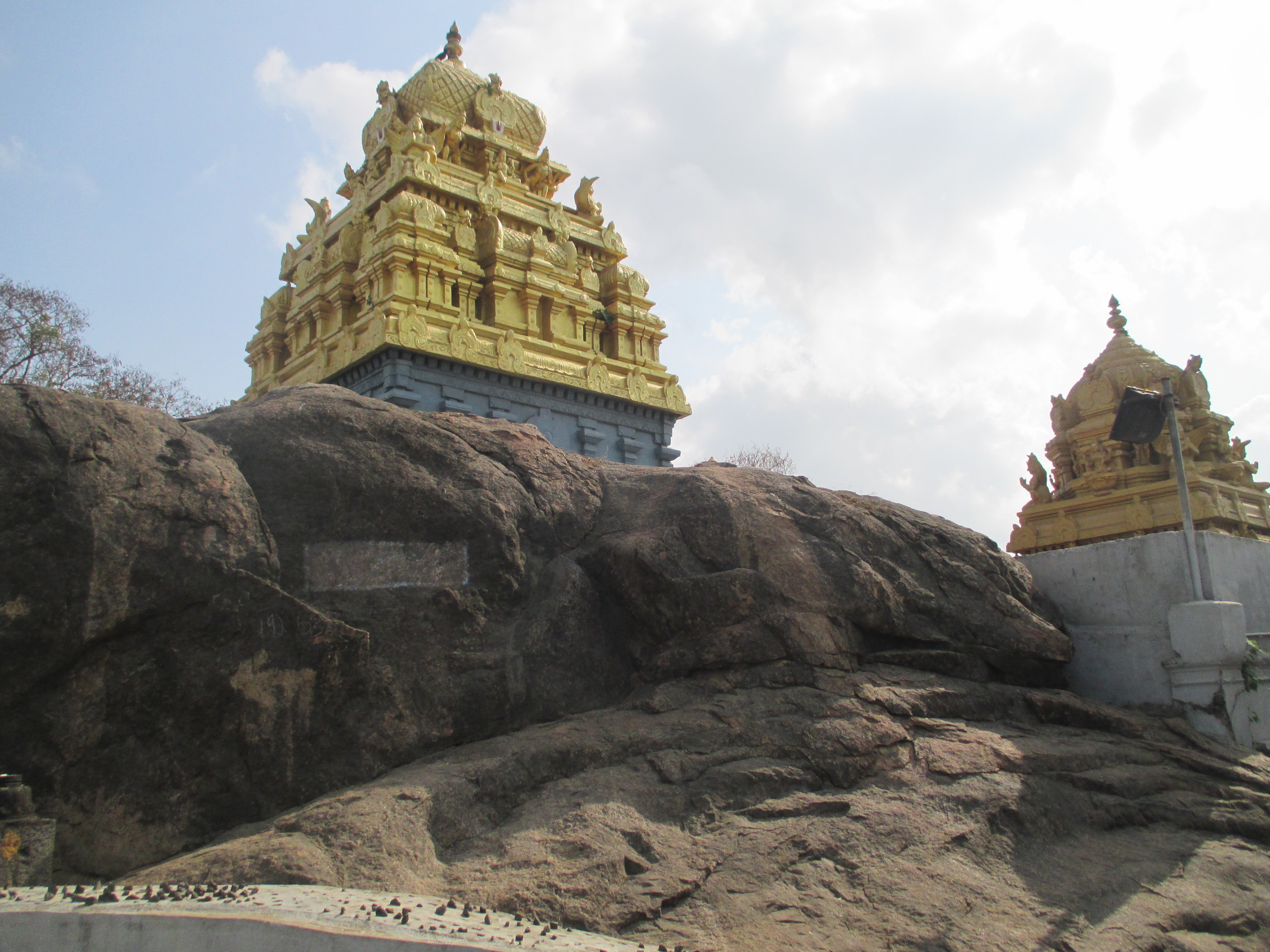

- Location in Chennai Metro, Chengalpattu, Tamil Nadu, India
- Coordinates: 12.7703°N 80.0087°E
- Country: India
- State: Tamil Nadu
- District: Chengalpattu
- Metro: Chennai

Population (2011)
  - Total: 13,566

Languages
  - Official: Tamil
- Time zone: UTC+5:30 (IST)
- PIN: Chengalpattu-603204
- Telephone code: 91-44
- Vehicle registration: TN-19

Singaperumal Koil is a satellite town city of Chennai located between Chengalpattu and Maraimalai Nagar in Chengalpattu district in the Indian state of Tamil Nadu. It is a part of the area Chennai Metropolitan Development Authority (CMDA) in the Chennai Metropolitan Area.

== Demographics ==
As of 2011 India census, Singaperumal Koil had a population of 13566. The sex ratio of Singaperumal koil is 1001 i.e. 1001 females for every 1000 males. Singaperumal Koil has an average literacy rate of 86.96%, higher than the national average of 59.5%: male literacy is 93.24%, and female literacy is 80.66%. In Singaperumal Koil, 12.2954% of the population is under 6 years of age.

== Notable site ==
- Padalathri Narasimhar Temple

Sri Padalathri Narasimhar Thirukovil (Padalathripuram) is the most famous landmark. It is a historic Narasimha temple located on a small hillock near GST Road.
