= Kilambakkam =

- Neighbourhood
- Kilambakkam, Tamil Nadu Kilambakkam (Tamil Nadu) Kilambakkam (India)
- Coordinates: 12.869480°N 80.074160°E
- Country: India
- State: Tamil Nadu
- Metro: Chennai
- Taluk: Vandalur
- District: Chengalpattu
- City: Tambaram
- Elevation: 57 m (187 ft)
- PIN: 600048
- Vehicle registration: TN-11

Kilambakkam is a neighborhood in Tambaram, Chennai City, Tamil Nadu, India. It is located between Vandalur and Urapakkam along Grand Southern Trunk Road (GST Road). It is the entrance gateway for the Chennai metropolitan area from the southern end. CMDA has constructed a bus terminus for South bound buses and Extension of Metro Rail Phase 1 of Chennai Metro Rail Limited.

Kilambakkam is part of Chennai Tambaram City Municipal Corporation.

== Developments ==
Due to heavy congestion in Chennai Mofussil Bus Terminus in Koyambedu and High traffic within Chennai City, CMDA has constructed a satellite bus terminus on the outskirts of Chennai.

All the buses bounding to southern districts depart from the Kilambakkam Mofussil Bus Terminus (KMBT) and also halts at this place instead of plying towards CMBT in Koyambedu. The new bus terminus is located very close to Arignar Anna Zoological Park in Vandalur.

Chennai Metro Rail Limited also announced the extension of Corridor 1 in Chennai Metro Rail Phase I from Airport to Kilambakkam via Pallavaram, Tambaram, Perungalathur and Vandalur to connect the areas within the city to the proposed new bus terminus. Chennai Airport - Kilambakkam metro line project is under active consideration of the State Government of Tamil Nadu.

With Kilambakkam railway station under construction, the neighborhoods of Kilambakkam are currently served by Vandalur Railway Station of the Chennai Suburban Railway Network.
