= Madurantakam (disambiguation) =

Madurantakam is a town in the Indian state of Tamil Nadu.

Madurantakam may also refer to:

- Madurantakam taluk, a taluk (subdivision) of the state centred on the town
- Madurantakam division, a state revenue division
- Madurantakam block, a state revenue block
- Madurantakam railway station, a railway station in the town
- Maduranthakam (state assembly constituency), a state assembly constituency
- Madhurantakam Rajaram, an Indian author
