= Nandeesvarar Temple, Nandivanam =

Hindu temple

- Nandeesvarar Temple, Nandivaram-Guduvancheri, Chengalpattu, Tamil Nadu

Religion
- Affiliation: Hinduism
- District: Chengalpattu
- Deity: Nandeesvarar
- Festival: Maha Shivaratri

Location
- Location: Nandivaram-Guduvancheri, Chennai
- State: Tamil Nadu
- Country: India
- Interactive map of Nandeesvarar Temple, Nandivanam
- Coordinates: 12°50′45.6″N 80°03′52.2″E

Architecture
- Type: Dravidian architecture

Specifications
- Temple: One
- Elevation: 44.23 m (145 ft)

Nandeesvarar Temple is a Hindu temple dedicated to the deity Shiva, located at Nandivanam in Chennai City, Kanchipuram district, Tamil Nadu, India.

== Vaippu Sthalam ==
It is one of the shrines of the Vaippu Sthalams sung by Tamil Saivite Nayanar Appar. This place is also known as Nandikecchuram. The temple in Mysore on Nandhi Hills is also called as Nandhikechuram. Two places are referred as Nandivanam. In an article in the journal entitled Kumarakubaran, April 1972, Nandivanam has been referred as Vaippu Thalam. In the article V.T.Sengalvarayapillai says that Nandikecchuram might have become Nandivanam. R. P. Sethu Pillai says that the Shiva temple which is found on the Nandhi Hills is known as Nandikecchuram.

== Presiding deity ==
The presiding deity in the garbhagriha, represented by the lingam, is known as Nandeesvarar. The Goddess is known as Soundaranayaki.

== Specialities ==
nandhi worshipped the presiding deity of the temple. Once a boy was shepherd cows belonging to a rich man. Of them one cow used to offer milk in a particular place. So, it could not yield milk after returning. When the man asked the boy the reason for it he told him that the act of one particular cow which offered milk in the place. The man did not believe the boy and went to the place which was mentioned by the boy. When the man took attempt to see the place a linga appeared from the place. Pradosham and Thiruvadhirai festivals are held in this temple. Chitra Pournami, Ippasi Shasti, Margazhi and Panguni Utthiram are also held here.

== Structure ==
In the prakara, Vinayaka, Subramania with his consorts Valli and Deivanai, Dakshinamurthy, Vishnu and Brahma are found. Shrines of Navagaraha is also found. In the right side shrine of the goddess is found, in standing posture. The linga is very beautiful to look at. The entrance of the temple is facing east. The temple has a tank, known as Nandisvara tank.

== Location ==
The temple can be reached at Nandhivaram in Guduvancheri in Chennai-Chengalpattu road. Puja are held twice daily in this temple.
