= Chemman Cherry =

Chemman Cherry Semmancheri
- panchayat town
- Location in Tamil Nadu, India
- Coordinates: 12°47′4″N 80°14′53″E
- Country: India
- State: Tamil Nadu
- District: Chengalpattu
- Metro: Chennai

Languages
  - Official: Tamil
- Time zone: UTC+5:30 (IST)
- Vehicle registration: TN-14

Chemman Cherry, also known as Semmancheri, is a panchayat town of Chengalpattu district in the Indian state of Tamil Nadu located in the southern part of the Chennai Metropolitan Area. It is close to Siruseri IT Park and next to Sholinganallur on IT highway (Rajiv Gandhi salai) chennai-600119. Prime location which has Sathyabama University, National Maritime University, and Semmancheri Slum Clearance Board. New high-rise towers in gated-community by DLF (Garden city), Appasamy's Splendour, Bollineni (Hillside) and AWHO (Army Welfare Housing Organization) are here. Semmanchery has a small ancient temple (Srinivasa Perumal temple). Also upcoming Metro train station(Line 3) and has star hotels such as The Elite Grand, Marriott and Sheraton.A mini mall "Superette" which has Punjabi Restaurant PiND and Bhatinda Express, Thea Spa, Sublime Boutique and Orange Play house.
