= Tozhuppedu =

Tozhuppedu தொழுப்பேடு
- Thozhuppedu, Chengalpattu, Tamil Nadu
- Coordinates: 12.3614°N 79.7909°E
- Country: India
- State: Tamil Nadu
- District: Chengalpattu
- Elevation: 47.7 m (156 ft)

Language
  - Primary: Tamil
- Time zone: UTC+5:30 (IST)

Tozhuppedu or Perumber Kandigai is a town in the Chengalpattu district of Tamil Nadu, India. It has a railway station and a bus stop for buses to Tindivanam.
