= Kattankulathur block =

Coordinates: 12.808°N 80.029°E

Kattankulathur block is a revenue block in the Chengalpattu district of Tamil Nadu, India. It has a total of 39 panchayat villages.

The block is semi-urban and is fully part of the newly expanded Chennai Metropolitan Area.

#	District	Block	Village
1	Chengalpattu	Kattankolathur	Alapakkam
2	Chengalpattu	Kattankolathur	Anjur
3	Chengalpattu	Kattankolathur	Appur
4	Chengalpattu	Kattankolathur	Athur
5	Chengalpattu	Kattankolathur	Chettipuniyam
6	Chengalpattu	Kattankolathur	Guruvanmedu
7	Chengalpattu	Kattankolathur	Kalvoy
8	Chengalpattu	Kattankolathur	Karanaipuducheri
9	Chengalpattu	Kattankolathur	Karunilam
10	Chengalpattu	Kattankolathur	Kayarambedu
11	Chengalpattu	Kattankolathur	Keerapakkam
12	Chengalpattu	Kattankolathur	Kolathur
13	Chengalpattu	Kattankolathur	Kondamangalam
14	Chengalpattu	Kattankolathur	Kumizhi
15	Chengalpattu	Kattankolathur	Kunnavakkam
16	Chengalpattu	Kattankolathur	Mannivakkam
17	Chengalpattu	Kattankolathur	Melamaiyur
18	Chengalpattu	Kattankolathur	Nallambakkam
19	Chengalpattu	Kattankolathur	Nedugundram
20	Chengalpattu	Kattankolathur	Ozhaloor
21	Chengalpattu	Kattankolathur	Palur
22	Chengalpattu	Kattankolathur	Patravakkam
23	Chengalpattu	Kattankolathur	Pazhaveli
24	Chengalpattu	Kattankolathur	Periyapotheri
25	Chengalpattu	Kattankolathur	Perumattunallur
26	Chengalpattu	Kattankolathur	Pulipakkam
27	Chengalpattu	Kattankolathur	Reddipalayam
28	Chengalpattu	Kattankolathur	Singaperumal Koil
29	Chengalpattu	Kattankolathur	Thenmelpakkam
30	Chengalpattu	Kattankolathur	Thimmavaram
31	Chengalpattu	Kattankolathur	Thiruvadisoolam
32	Chengalpattu	Kattankolathur	Unamancheri
33	Chengalpattu	Kattankolathur	Urapakkam
34	Chengalpattu	Kattankolathur	Vallam
35	Chengalpattu	Kattankolathur	Vandaloor
36	Chengalpattu	Kattankolathur	Veerapuram
37	Chengalpattu	Kattankolathur	Vengadamangalam
38	Chengalpattu	Kattankolathur	Venkatapuram
39	Chengalpattu	Kattankolathur	Villiyambakkam
