= Kovilambakkam =

- Rural Village
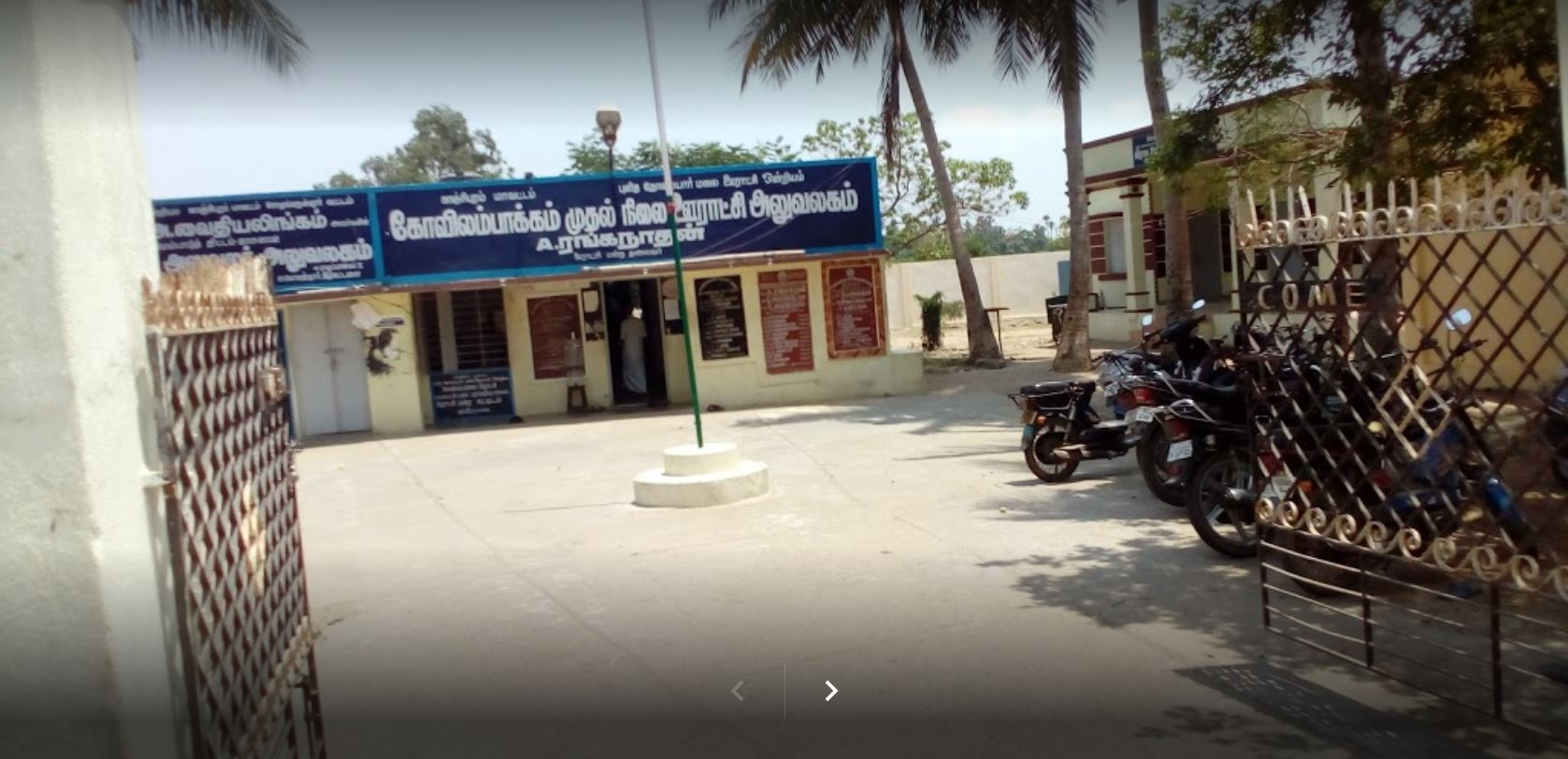
- Kovilambakkam Panchayat Office

- Location within Chennai
- Coordinates: 12.9457357°N 80.2014543°E
- Country: India
- State: Tamil Nadu
- District: Chengalpattu and Chennai
- Metro: Chennai Metro
- Taluk: Tambaram and Sholinganallur
- Village panchayat: Kovilambakkam
- President: Geetha Manimaran

Government
  - Type: Panchayat
  - Body: Kovilambakkam Village Panchayat

Population (2011)
  - Total: 27,374

Languages
  - Official: Tamil
- Time zone: UTC+5:30 (IST)
- PIN: 600129
- Telephone code: 91-44
- Vehicle registration: TN-14
- Lok Sabha constituency: Chennai South
- Legislative Assembly constituency: Sholinganallur (state assembly constituency)
- Website: https://chengalpattu.nic.in/ https://chennai.nic.in/ https://www.kovilambakkam.com (Governmental)

Kovilambakkam is a rural village very close to Tambaram, India. It is a village panchayat located in Tambaram taluk, Chengalpattu district , about 12 km from Tambaram. The neighbourhood spans the areas of Sunnambu Kolathur (Madipakkam-B / Madipakkam-II revenue village), Chinna Kovilambakkam and Periya Kovilambakkam.

Kovilambakkam will be part of Tambaram City Municipal Corporation but Sunnambu kolathur revenue village Madipakkam-II will continue to be an orphan as it is neither part of Tambaram taluk, Chengalpattu district nor Sholinganallur Taluk in Chennai district. Previously Madipakkam-II VAO said that Madipakkam-II is part of Zone-14 of Greater Chennai Corporation but from they year 2026 the VAO Baakkiyalakshmi is in permanent WFH (Work From Home) using her phone number 9442949439 and only her assistants keep the office open for half a day once a month.

== Governance ==
The neighbourhood is administered by the Kovilambakkam Village Panchayat, which is under control of St. Thomas Mount Panchayat Union, Chengalpattu district. The area and population of Kovilambakkam spans two revenue villages in Tamil Nadu, namely, Koilambakkam (wards 1, 2, 5, 6, 7, 8, 9, 10, 11, 12) which comes under Tambaram taluk in Chengalpattu district and Madipakkam-II (wards 3, 4) which were previously part of Sholinganallur taluk in Chennai District and are now orphans being neither part of Chennai District or Chengalpattu District. In February 2026, The Commissionerate of Revenue and Disaster Management, Government of Tamil Nadu, bifurcated Madipakkam-II and created a new revenue village named S.Kolathur.

Even though this is a rural area, 50% of kovilambakkam rural village panchayat (named Madipakkam-II disaster and revenue village) is under Zone-14 of Greater Chennai Corporation (GCC) for Disaster and revenue purpose. So, whenever Madipakkam-II (aka Sunnambu kolathur) villagers request for flood / disaster relief like Michaung flood relief, Chennai district collector Tmt. Rashmi siddharth zagade, IAS takes the request and transfers it to Kovilambakkam rural village panchayat president through Department of Municipal Administration and Water Supply thus ensuring that the Sunnambu Kolathur villagers never receive any disaster relief from Government of Tamil Nadu

In December 2023, Cyclone Michaung caused 5.5 feet high floods in Viduthalai Nagar 2nd main road by building storm water drains to discharge water from Kovilambakkam and Sunnambu kolathur lakes to City Union Bank, Kovilambakkam branch. The storm water entered Viduthalai nagar 2nd main road instead of Narayanpuram lakes. This was 5 times the capacity of Narayanapuram lake and the outlet near A2B restaurant couldn't carry this water to marshland.

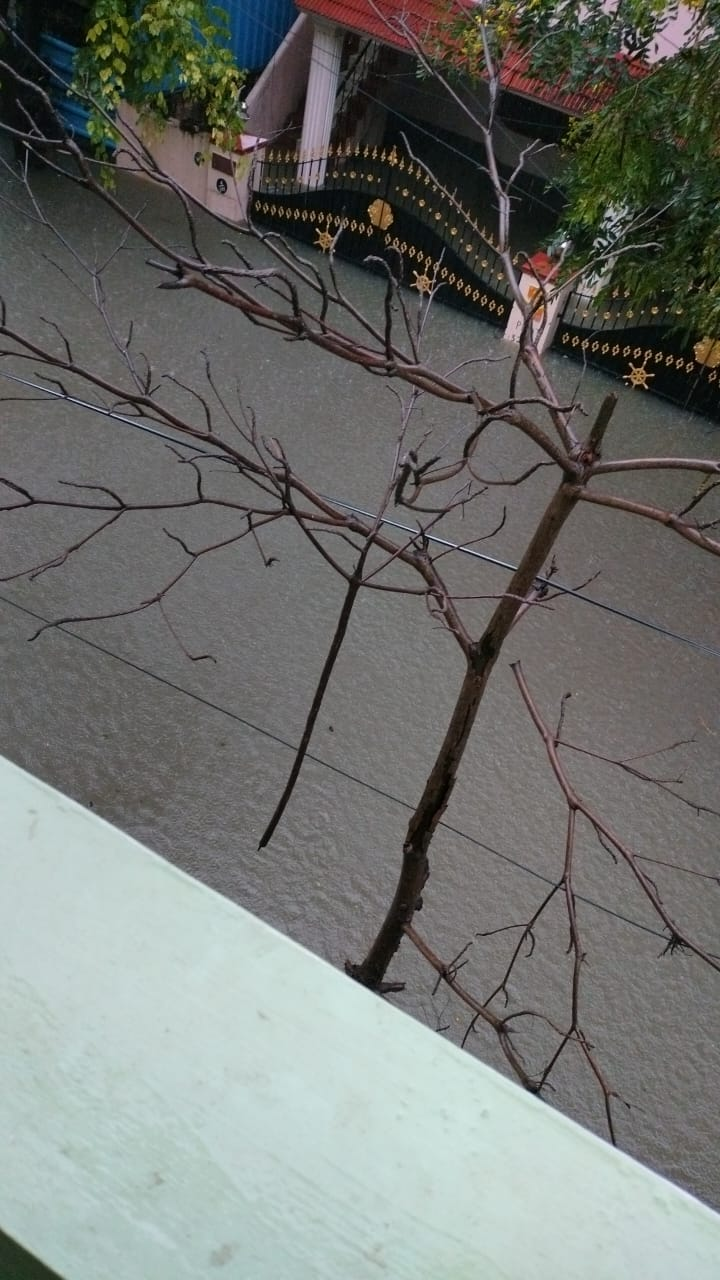
The rural village during the 2023 flood

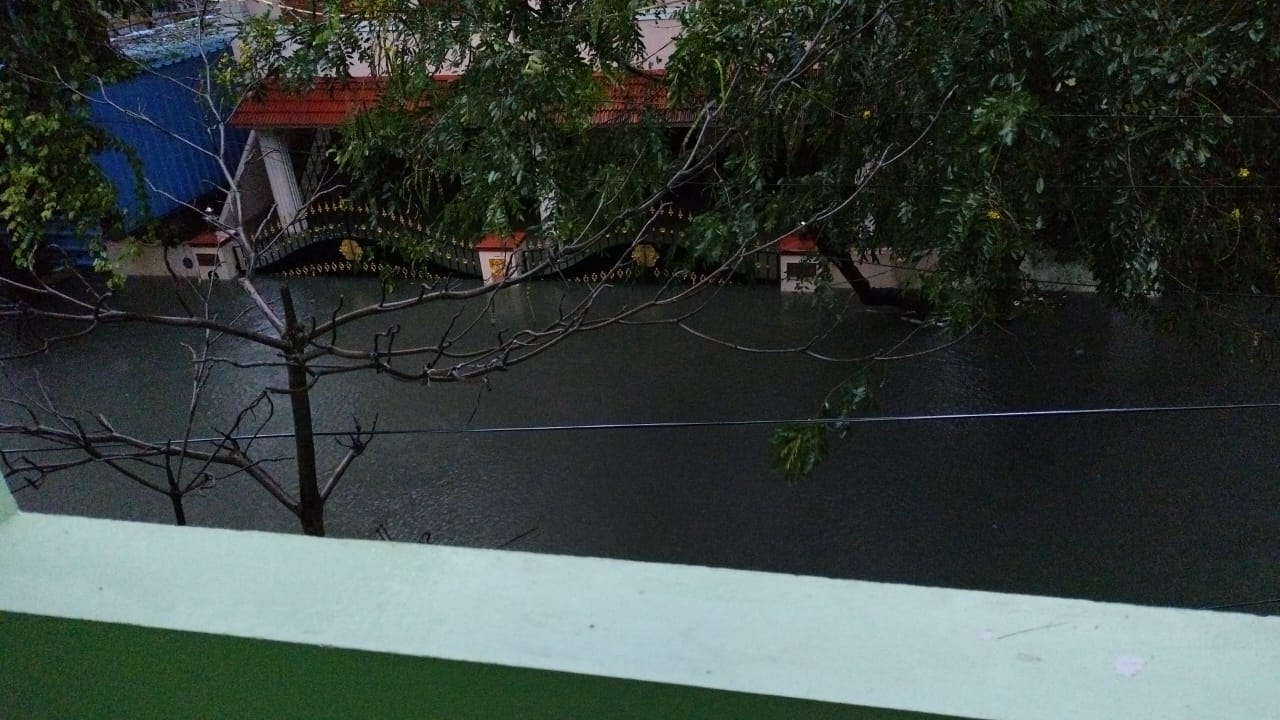
The inundated rural village during the floods

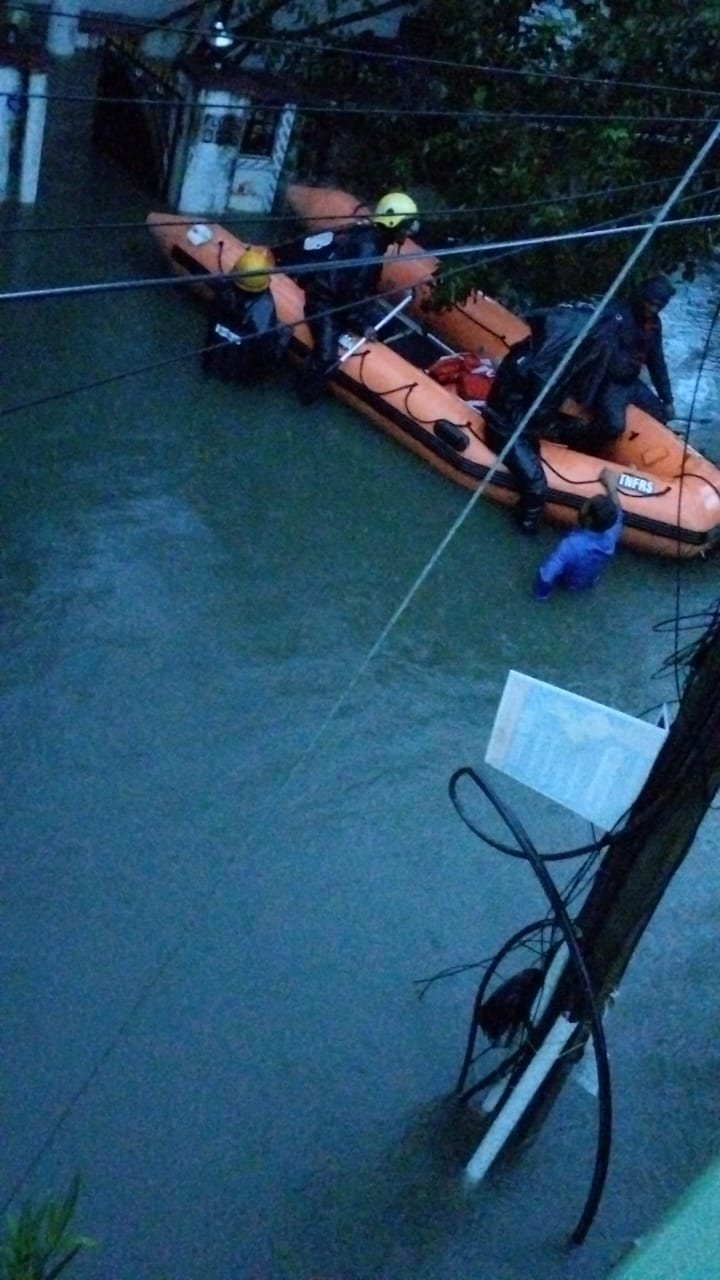
People being rescued during the floods

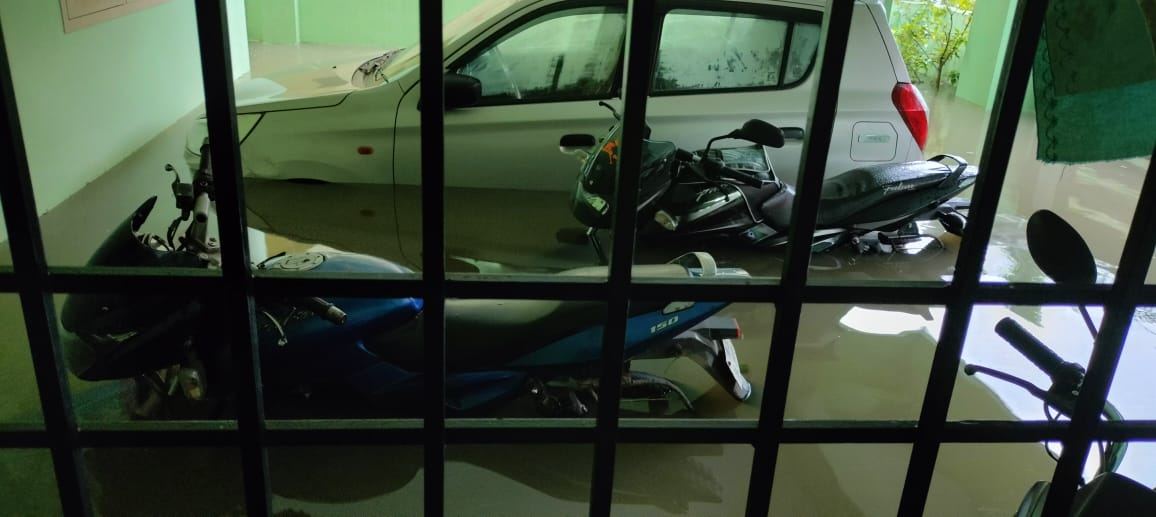
Flood water entering households

== Demographics ==
As of 2011^{[update]} India census, Kovilambakkam had a population of 27,374. Males constitute 13,935 of the population and females 13,439. There were 7,010 households. Kovilambakkam has an average literacy rate of 72.55%, higher than the national average of 59.5%: male literacy is 55.7%, and female literacy is 44.3%. In Kovilambakkam, 14% of the population is under 6 years of age.

During the 2027 house listing census conducted in August 2026, Tamil Nadu government purposely all of the 2000+ houses in Madipakkam-II / S.Kolathur revenue village (Kovilambakkam rural panchayat wards 3 and 4) since this is an orphan village not under Chennai or Chengalpattu districts and the inhabitants there are no longer eligible for government schemes like getting patta, flood relief, etc. in spite of continuously paying property taxes for their houses to Kovilambakkam rural village panchayat which comes under Tamil Nadu state only.

== Geography ==
The neighbourhood has a lake known as the Kovilambakkam lake. It is connected with the Narayanapuram lake in Pallikaranai by means of a 3.5-km-long surplus channel to drain rainwater. The canal has a carrying capacity of 12,000 cusecs (cubic feet per second) of water. However, there are complaints of sewage being dumped into the canal by the Tambaram City Municipal Corporation

== Infrastructure ==
Kovilambakkam is located along the Pallavaram–Thoraipakkam 200-feet Radial Road. It is also one of the areas that will be connected by the phase II network of the Chennai Metro currently under construction.

== Schools and colleges ==
- Govt. Higher Secondary School
- DAV Co-ed School, Pallikaranai (located on Sunnambu Kolathur main road)
- A. V. G. Vidyalaya Matriculation School
- Nethaji Vidhyalayam School
- Golden School
- Pole Star Matriculation School
- Himayam Matriculation School
- Panchayat Union Primary School
- Srujana International school (formerly Srujana Montessori School)
