= Chennai metropolitan area =

Chennai metropolitan area Greater Chennai
- Metropolitan area
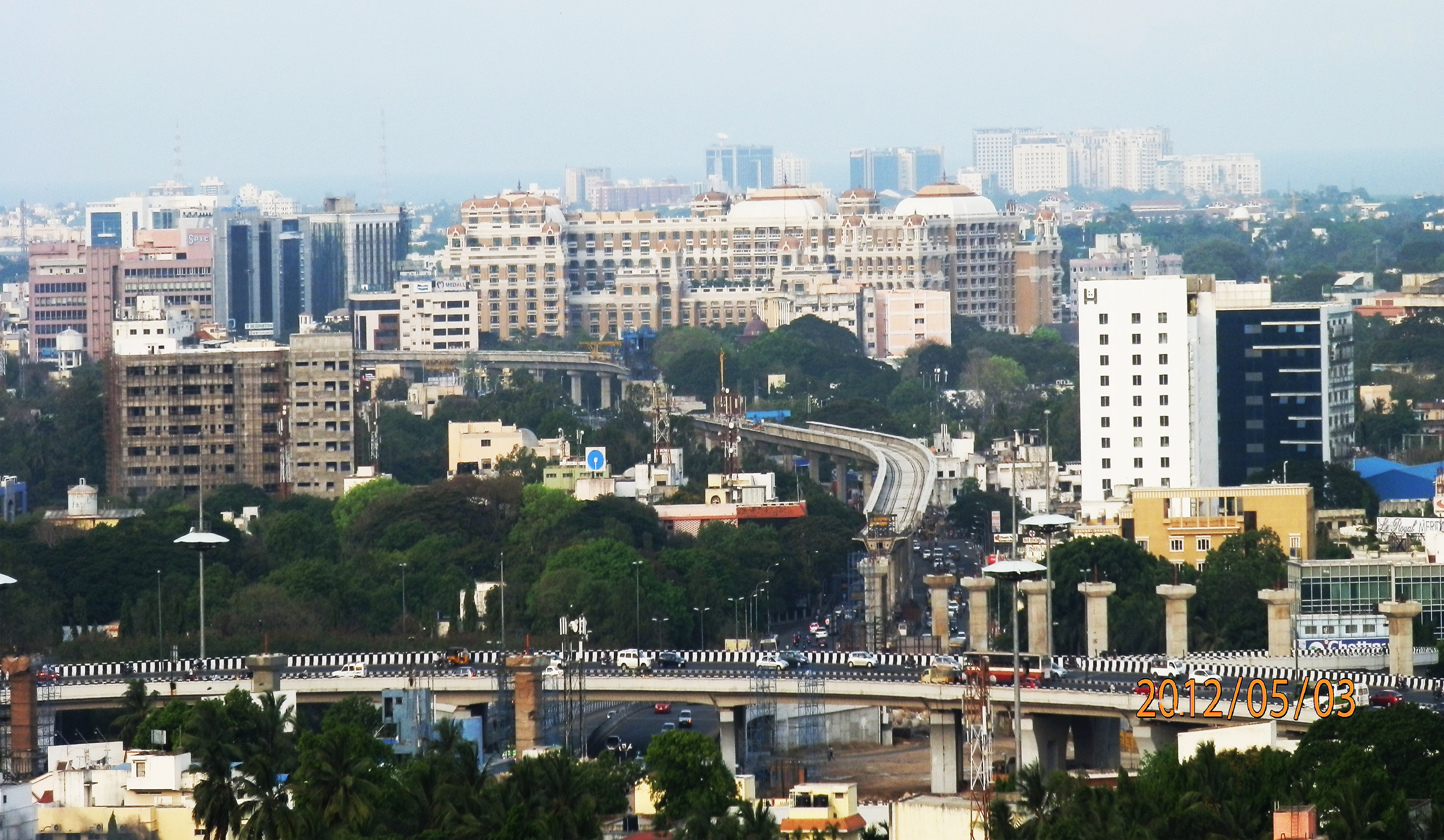
- Chennai skyline

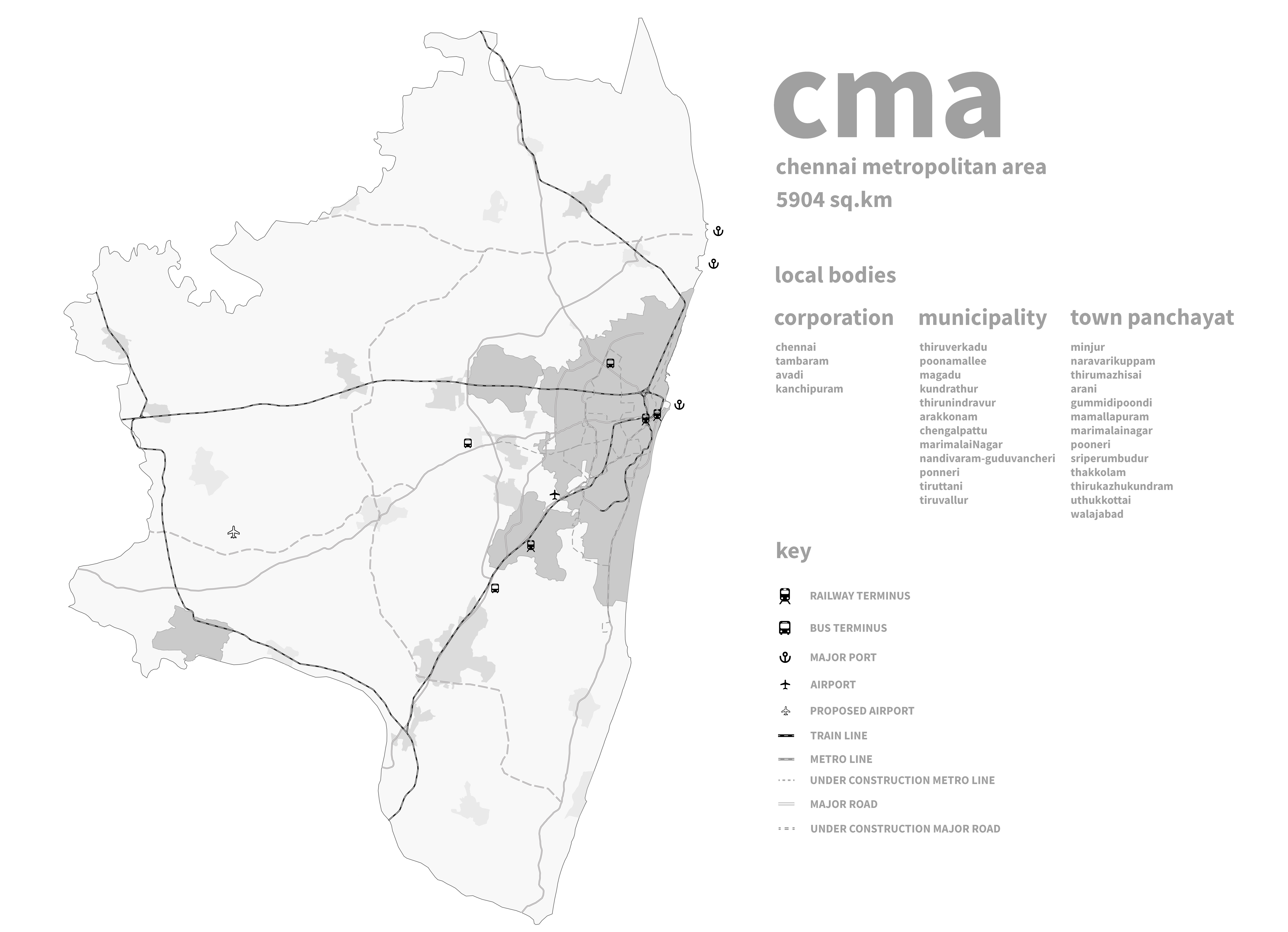
- CMA expanded boundary
- Interactive map of Chennai metropolitan area
- Country: India
- State: Tamil Nadu
- Core city: Chennai
- Districts: Chennai, Kancheepuram, Chengalpattu, Tiruvallur, Ranipet

Area
  - Metro: 5,904 km^{2} (2,280 sq mi)

Population (2023)
  - Rank: 4
  - Metro: 14,510,000
  - Metro density: 2,458/km^{2} (6,365/sq mi)
- Demonym(s): Chennai vasi, Chennaiite, Chennai karan
- Time zone: UTC+5:30 (Indian Standard Time)
- GDP: US$ 219 Billion
- Website: www.cmdachennai.gov.in
- Area note: Area of CMA was expanded from 1189 sq.km to 5904 sq.km in 2022. Population note: As per the 2011 census, population corresponding to the pre-expansion limits was about 8.9 million. The population estimate corresponding to the post-expansion limits was given as 11.76 million (based on census 2011) by CMDA. The estimated population in 2023 was given as 14.51 million by CMDA.

Chennai metropolitan area or Greater Chennai is the fourth-most populous metropolitan area in India and the 35th most populous in the world. It consists of the core city of Chennai, which is coterminous with the Chennai district, and its suburbs in Kanchipuram, Chengalpattu, Thiruvallur and Ranipet districts.

The Chennai Metropolitan Development Authority is the nodal agency that handles town planning and development within the metro area. In 1974, an area encompassing 1,189 km^{2} (459 sq mi) around the city was designated as the metropolitan area which was subsequently expanded to 5,904 km^{2} (2,280 sq mi) in 2022.

== History ==
In 1974, the Madras metropolitan area comprised a total extent of 1,189 km^{2} (459 sq mi). In 2011, first plans to expand the metropolitan area were proposed by Chennai Metropolitan Development Authority (CMDA) as several settlements on the outer vicinity had been undergoing rapid development and had to be incorporated under the CMDA planning strategy. While other metropolises in India had already redefined their respective metropolitan regions to include much larger areas, CMA had not been altered since it was first defined in 1974. In July 2012, the CMDA suggested two options to the Government of Tamil Nadu for expanding the area with the first option including the whole of the Chennai, seven taluks each from Tiruvallur and Kancheepuram districts extending up to 4,459 km^{2} (1,722 sq mi) and the second option including the whole of Chennai, Tiruvallur and Kancheepuram districts and Arakkonam taluk extending to a total of 8,878 km^{2} (3,428 sq mi). In July 2017, the Government of Tamil Nadu announced its intention to expand the CMA to 8,878 km^{2} (3,428 sq mi) with the whole process expected to be completed by July 2018.

On 22 January 2018, Government of Tamil Nadu issued a Government order to declare the intention to include additional areas in the Chennai Metropolitan Planning Area under the Tamil Nadu Town and Country Planning Act, 1971. As per the act, the government is required to allow reasonable opportunity (two months) for inhabitants, local authorities and institutions in the area to comment upon or object to such an expansion proposals and few objections were received including a public interest litigation filed at the Madras High Court in March 2018. The plan was later modified and in October 2022, the metropolitan area was expanded to 5,904 km^{2} (2,280 sq mi).

== Distribution and composition ==
The metropolitan area consists of four municipal corporations (Greater Chennai, Tambaram, Avadi, Kancheepuram), 12 municipalities (Arakkonam, Mangadu, Kundrathur, Poonamallee, Thiruverkadu, Thiruninravur, Tiruvallur, Tiruttani, Maraimalai Nagar, Chengalpattu, Ponneri, Guduvancheri) and other smaller panchayats spread across the districts of Chennai, Thiruvallur, Kancheepuram, Chengalpattu and Ranipet. The planning and development is overseen by the Chennai Metropolitan Development Authority (CMDA), a Tamil Nadu State Government organisation in charge of town in the region. CMA is divided into three zones – north, central and south.

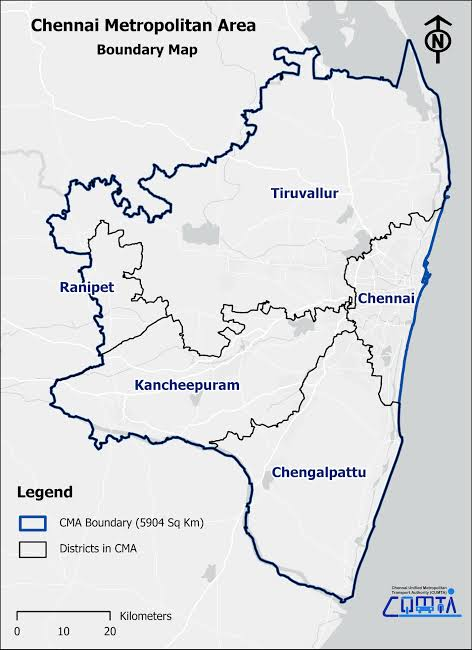

The State government had announced the formation of six satellite townships – Minjur covering 111 sq. kilometres, Thirumazhisai 34 sq. km., Chengalpattu 136 sq. km., Mamallapuram 123 sq. km., Kancheepuram 99 sq. km. and Tiruvallur 37 sq. km., through Government Orders (G.O.) issued in 2023.

Constituents of Chennai Metropolitan Area
| Zone | Area (km^{2}) | District | Taluk |
|---|---|---|---|
| Central | 1,189 | Chennai district | Alandur, Ambattur, Aminjikarai, Ayanavaram, Egmore, Guindy, Madhavaram, Maduravoyal, Mambalam, Mylapore, Perambur, Purasawalkam, Sholinganallur, Thiruvottiyur, Tondiarpet, Velachery |
| Central | 1,189 | Chengalpattu district | Pallavaram, Tambaram, Vandalur |
| Central | 1,189 | Kanchipuram district | Kundrathur |
| Central | 1,189 | Tiruvallur district | Avadi, Poonamallee, Ponneri |
| North | 2,908 | Tiruvallur district | Gummidipoondi, Poonamallee, Ponneri, Tiruvallur, Tiruttani, Uthukottai |
| North | 2,908 | Kanchipuram district | Sriperumbudur |
| North | 2,908 | Ranipet district | Arakkonam, Nemili |
| South | 1,809 | Chengalpattu district | Chengalpattu, Tirukalukundram, Thiruporur, Vandalur |
| South | 1,809 | Kanchipuram district | Kundrathur, Kanchipuram, Walajabad |

== Administration ==
The CMDA regulates developments in the Chennai metropolitan area through the issuance of planning permission under section 49 of the Tamil Nadu Town and Country Planning Act 1971.

Agencies responsible for public services
| Agency | Responsibility |
|---|---|
| Chennai Metropolitan Development Authority | Urban planning and project implementation |
| Local bodies (Municipal Corporations, Municipalities and Panchayats) | Civic management |
| Chennai MetroWater Supply and Sewage Board | Water Supply and sewerage |
| Chennai Unified Metropolitan Transport Authority | Transport and transport infrastructure |
| Department of Highways; Tamil Nadu Road Infrastructure Development Corporation; Tamil Nadu Road Development Company | Construction and maintenance of highways and roads |
| Chennai-Ennore Port Road Company | Maintenance of road connecting ports |
| Metropolitan Transport Corporation; Tamil Nadu State Transport Corporation; State Express Transport Corporation | Public bus transport |
| Chennai Metro Rail Limited | Metro rail transport |
| Southern Railway | Railway, Suburban railway and MRTS |
| Regional Transport department | Transport services (Vehicle registration and compliance, road taxes, driving license) |
| Commissionerate of Road Safety | Road safety |
| Chennai Port Trust | Port |
| Airports Authority of India | Airport and air transport |
| Chennai Smart City Limited | Core infrastructure transformation and rejuvenation |
| Chennai City Traffic Police; Avadi Traffic Police; Tambaram Traffic Police; Traffic police of Tiruvallur, Kanchipuram, Chengalpattu and Ranipet districts | Traffic management |
| Greater Chennai Police; District police of Tiruvallur, Kanchipuram, Chengalpattu and Ranipet districts | Crime, cyber crime and law & order management |
| Tamil Nadu Electricity Board; Tamil Nadu Power Distribution Corporation Limited; Tamil Nadu Power Generation Corporation Limited; Tamil Nadu Transmission Corporation | Electricity generation and supply |
| Tamil Nadu Pollution Control Board | Pollution control |
| Department of Revenue | Revenue administration |
| Public Works Department | Implementation and maintenance of macro drainage system |
| Department of Registration | Land registration, stamp duties |
| Tamil Nadu Housing Board | Provision of plots and houses, sites and services |
| Tamil Nadu Urban Habitat Development Board | Housing, infrastructure and livelihood in slums |
| Aavin | Milk procurement and distribution |

== Economy ==
As of 2017, the GDP of the metropolitan is estimated at US$219 billion, ranking it amongst the most productive metro areas of India. Chennai has a broad industrial base in the automobile, computer, technology, hardware manufacturing and healthcare sectors. As of 2012, the city is India's second-largest exporter of information technology (IT) and business process outsourcing (BPO) services. A major part of India's automobile industry is located in and around the city thus earning it the nickname "Detroit of Asia". According to Euromonitor, Chennai is the third-most visited city in India by international tourists and is known as the "Gateway to South India".

== See also ==
- List of metropolitan areas in Asia by population
- List of metropolitan areas in India
- List of million-plus urban agglomerations in India
- List of urban agglomerations in Tamil Nadu
