= Thiruporur taluk =

Taluk in Chengalpattu district

Thiruporur
- Taluk
- Thiruporur

Area
  - Total: 395.92 km^{2} (152.87 sq mi)

Population (2011)
  - Total: 156,427
  - Density: 395.10/km^{2} (1,023.3/sq mi)

Thiruporur taluk is a taluk in Chengalpattu district of the Indian state of Tamil Nadu. The headquarters of the taluk is the town of Thiruporur.

== History ==
This taluk was created by the former chief minister J.Jayalalithaa in 2012 bifurcating Chengalpattu Taluk due to population increase.

Thiruporur taluk was previously a part of the Kanchipuram district. After the bifurcation of Kanchipuram district, Thiruporur taluk became a part of the Chengalpattu district.

== Administration ==
The taluk is administered by the Tahsildar office located in Thiruporur.

== Villages ==
There are 57 villages in the newly created Thiruporur taluk. Some are listed below:

- Pattipulam
- Payanoor
- Pudupakkam
