= Richard Benyon (disambiguation) =

Richard Benyon (born 1960) is a British Conservative Party politician, MP for Newbury and life peer.

Richard Benyon may also refer to:

- Richard Benyon of Madras (1698–1774), British merchant and colonial administrator
- Richard Benyon (MP for Peterborough) (1746–1796), British politician and son of the above
- Richard Benyon De Beauvoir, MP for Wallingford and High Sheriff of Berkshire, son of the above
- Richard Fellowes Benyon a.k.a. Richard Fellowes (1811–1897), MP for and High Sheriff of Berkshire, nephew of the above
- Richard Shelley Benyon (1892–1976), Royal Navy admiral and High Sheriff of Buckinghamshire
