= Orathy =

Coordinates: 12°22′51″N 79°41′38″E

Orathy is a village in Madurantakam taluk, Chengalpattu district, Tamil Nadu, India. There are more than 3000 inhabitants as of 2011.

== Religion ==
More than 80% of the village's population are Hindus. There are also Christians and Muslims in the village. There are several temples in the village. The festivals are celebrated every year in the temples of the village.
