= Oggiyamduraipakkam =

- census town
- Location in Tamil Nadu, India
- Coordinates: 12°56′30″N 80°14′24″E
- Country: India
- State: Tamil Nadu
- District: Chennai
- Taluka: Sholinganallur

Population (2011)
  - Total: 78,515

Languages
  - Official: Tamil
- Time zone: UTC+5:30 (IST)

Oggiyamduraipakkam is a census town in Chennai district in the Indian state of Tamil Nadu.

== Demographics ==
In the 2001 India census, Oggiyamduraipakkam had a population of 25,961. Males constituted 52% of the population and females 48%. Oggiyamduraipakkam had an average literacy rate of 73%, higher than the national average of 59.5%: male literacy was 78%, and female literacy was 67%. In 2001 in Oggiyamduraipakkam, 12% of the population was under 6 years of age.

In the 2011 census, Oggiyamduraipakkam had a population of 78,515.
