= Vandalur =

Census town in Chennai Metropolitan Area

- suburb
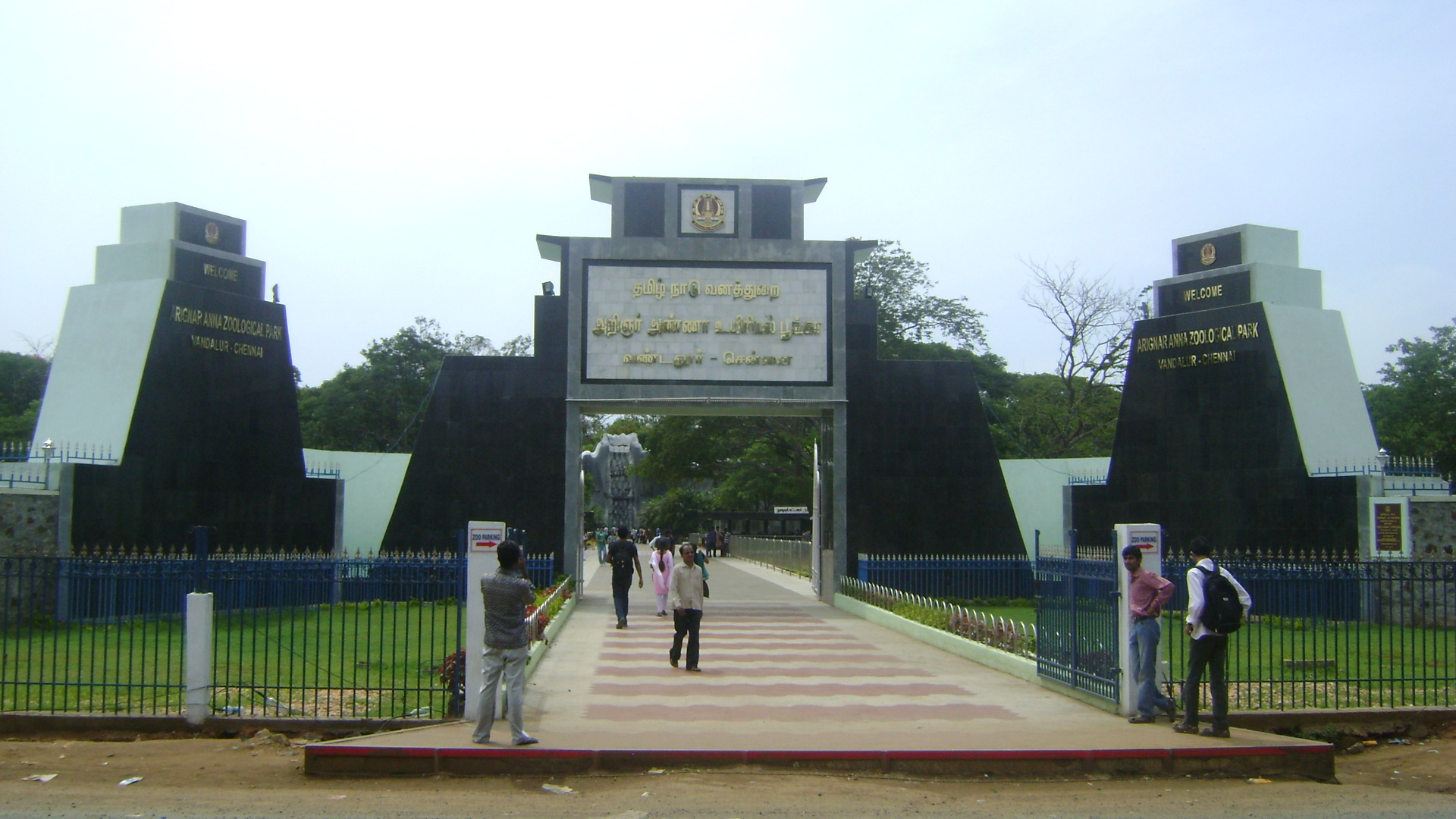
- Entrance to Arignar Anna Zoological Park

- Location within Chennai Location within Tamil Nadu Location within India
- Coordinates: 12.89°N 80.08°E
- Country: India
- State: Tamil Nadu
- District: Chengalpattu
- Metro: Chennai
- Elevation: 50 m (160 ft)

Population (2011)
  - Total: 16,852

Languages
  - Official: Tamil
- Time zone: UTC+5:30 (IST)
- PIN: 600048
- Vehicle registration: TN-11

Vandalur is a suburb of the city of Chennai and a taluk in Chengalpattu district. The Arignar Anna Zoological Park is situated in the locality. The area is served by Vandalur railway station of the Chennai Suburban Railway network. Southern gateway to Chennai, It is effectively an important entry/exit point for the southern side of the Chennai metropolitan area.

== Demographics ==
As per the 2011 census, Vandalur had total population of 16,852. Males constituted 49.9% of the population and females 50%. The average literacy rate was 79%, with male literacy at 85%, and female literacy at 72%. About 11% of the population is under six years of age.

== Location ==
Vandalur is a suburb of the city of Chennai, and forms part of the taluk of the same name in Chengalpattu district and. It forms part of the Chengalpattu Assembly constituency and Kancheepuram Lok Sabha constituency.

== Transport ==
Vandalur is located on the Grand Southern Trunk Road. It forms one of the termini of the Vandalur-Kelambakkam Road, connecting the highway with the Old Mahabalipuram Road. It forms part of the Outer Ring Road. It is served by the Vandalur railway station, which forms part of the South Line of the Chennai Suburban Railway Network. A flyover was constructed at a cost of ₹467.8 million (US$4.9 million) in 2012, which replaced the level crossing at the station. The Kilambakkam bus terminus is located close to Vandalur.

== Zoological park ==
Arignar Anna Zoological Park is located in Vandalur. It was established as Chennai zoo in 1855 and was the first public zoo in India. The construction of the new zoo at Vandalur started in 1979 and the zoo moved to the locality in 1985. As of 2023, the zoo is spread over an area of 602 hectares and houses 2,149 animals in 89 enclosures. Vandalur hill is part of the zoological park and is situated at an altitude of 126 m (413 ft).
