= Tirukalukundram block =

The Tirukalukundram block is a revenue block in the Chengalpattu district of Tamil Nadu, India. It has a total of 54 panchayat villages.
