= Chennai Unified Metropolitan Transport Authority =

Public bus operator

- Type: State Government enterprise
- Industry: Public Transport
- Headquarters: Chennai, Tamil Nadu, India
- Area served: Greater Chennai
- Products: Bus transport and cargo transport services
- Owner: Government of Tamil Nadu
- Parent: Department of Transport (Tamil Nadu)
- Website: CUMTA

The Chennai Unified Metropolitan Transport Authority (CUMTA) is a government agency in Chennai that participates in the local governance of public transport concerns.
