= Acharapakkam block =

Coordinates: 12.407407°N 79.818892°E

The Acharapakkam block is a revenue block in the Chengalpattu district of Tamil Nadu, India. It has a total of 59 panchayat villages.
