= Payanoor =

Coordinates: 12.6394°N 80.1751°E

- village
- Interactive map of Payanoor
- Country: India
- State: Tamil Nadu
- District: Chengalpattu

Languages
  - Official: Tamil
- Time zone: UTC+5:30 (IST)
- PIN: 603104
- Vehicle registration: TN 19

Payanoor or Paiyanoor is a village in Chengalpattu district in the Indian state of Tamil Nadu. It is the nearest area to Mahabalipuram. It is located on Old Mahabalipuram Road.

== Governance ==
Paiyanoor is a rural village panchayat within Thiruporur taluk.

Until 18 July 2019 Payanoor was part of Kancheepuram district, until the division of that district into two parts.

== Location ==
Payanoor is located on State Highway Old Mahabalipuram Road, 48 km away from Chennai and 7 km away from the famous tourist town Mahabalipuram and it is 3 km away from East Coast Road.
