= Thalambur =

- Location in Tamil Nadu, India
- Coordinates: 12.8535706°N 80.2073192°E
- Country: India
- State: Tamil Nadu
- District: Chengalpattu District
- Talukas: Thiruporur

Government
  - Type: democracy

Languages
  - Official: Tamil
- Time zone: UTC+5:30 (IST)
- PIN: 600130

Thalambur is a place which is located behind Navalur near Chennai. It is a pristine location for peaceful living.

== Locality introduction and neighbourhood ==
Thalambur is located between Sholinganallur and Navallur in the southern region of Chennai. Because of its proximity to famous IT corridor Old Mahabalipuram Road (OMR) (8.7Km), Thalambur has witnessed significant growth in the residential sector. Thalambur enjoys good connectivity to its surrounding locations such as Ottiambakkam, Moolacheri, Sithalapakkam, Siruseri, Arasankazhani and Perumbakkam. Thalambur is home to several prestigious residential projects such as Casagrand Ritz, Casagrand Pavilion, Roomscapes Village, SKC Aparah and SSPDL Lakewood Enclave.

== Physical infrastructure ==
Chrompet Railway Station, Tambaram Railway Station, and Velachery MRTS & Tiruvanmiyur MRTS station are located at approximately 20km from Thalambur. With the help of buses, one can easily access neighbouring areas from Thalambur. Guindy Metro Station can be reached via Old Mahabalipuram Road from Thalambur. Furthermore, Chennai International Airport (23Km) is accessible via Pallavaram - Thuraipakkam Road within around 1-hour drive. A Global Sports City was planned by the Chennai Metropolitan Development Authority in April 2026.

Due to lack of proper infrastructure, it was flooded in 2020.

== Social & retail infra ==
Several international schools such as HLC International School, Amethyst International School, KC High International School and Gateway International School are located within a range of 8km radii from Thalambur. Gleneagles Global Health City, The Institute of Neurosciences & Spinal Disorders, Chettinad Health City and Arun Hospital are present within 10 km radii from Thalambur for any medical support. One can find plenty of shopping malls within 1Km to 3Km including Vivira Mall, Marina Mall, BMR Mall, KVP Complex and Glory Mother Traditional for all shopping and entertainment needs of residents.

== Livability ==
Thalambur is rated as 4.0/5 basis 4 reviews on environment, commuting & places of interest by Owners, Agents & Visitors. It is rated best on Neighbour, Connectivity parameters where it is being given an average rating of 4.5 while rated not good on Parking, Road as shown by average rating of 3.5. Residents have made efforts to save the Thalambur lake from being used as a garbage dumping ground.

== Nearby employment hubs ==
Thalambur enjoys connectivity to known employment hubs such as Siruseri(2.8Km), Taramani (18Km), Sholinganallur (7.8Km), Okkiyam Thoraipakkam (12.5Km) and Karapakkam (12.1Km). All these hubs can be easily reachable through Old Mahabalipuram Road from Thalambur.
