= Madurantakam division =

Madurantakam division is a revenue division in the Chengalpattu district of Tamil Nadu, India. It comprises the taluks of Cheyyur and Madurantakam.
