= Pattipulam =

Coordinates: 12°41′N 80°13′E

- village
- Location in Tamil Nadu, India Pattipulam (India)
- Country: India
- State: Tamil Nadu
- District: Chengalpattu

Languages
  - Official: Tamil
- Time zone: UTC+5:30 (IST)
- Telephone code: +91-44

Pattipulam is a village located in Tirupporur in Chengalpattu district of Tamil Nadu, India. This Gram panchayat belongs to both Tirupporur and Kancheepuram constituencies.
