= Vedagiriswarar Temple =

Vedagiriswarar temple
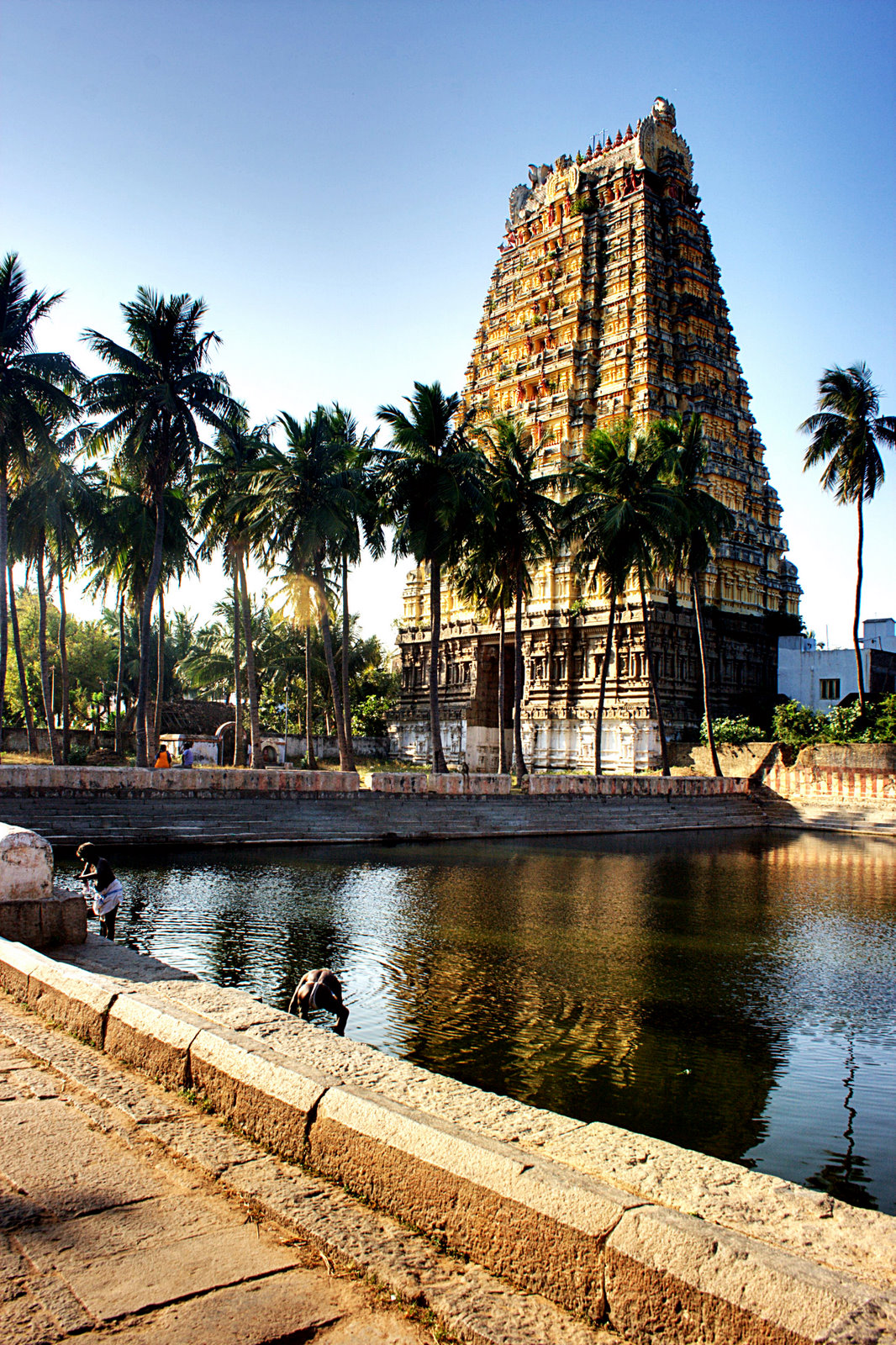
- A view of the temple, with the sacred pond in the foreground

- Location in Tamil Nadu

Religion
- Affiliation: Hinduism
- District: Chengalpattu
- Deity: Vedhagireeswarar (Shiva) Thirupurasundari (Parvati)

Location
- Location: Tirukalukundram, Tamil Nadu, India
- State: Tamil Nadu
- Country: India
- Coordinates: 12°36′24″N 80°03′45″E

Architecture
- Type: Dravidian architecture

The Vedagiriswarar Temple is a Hindu temple dedicated to the god Shiva, located in Tirukalukundram (also known as Thirukazhukundram), Tamil Nadu, India.

== The Temple ==
Tirukalukundram is known for the Vedagiriswarar temple complex, popularly known as kazhugu koil (eagle-temple). The temple consists of two structures, one at the foot-hill and the other on the hill's crest. The large hill-top temple (the main attraction) houses the deity Shiva, also known as Vedagiriswarar. The temple at the foot-hill is dedicated to his consort Parvati, known here as Thiripurasundari Amman. The temple at the foot-hills has four towers (gopurams), which closely resemble the architecture of the Annamalaiyar Temple.

== History ==
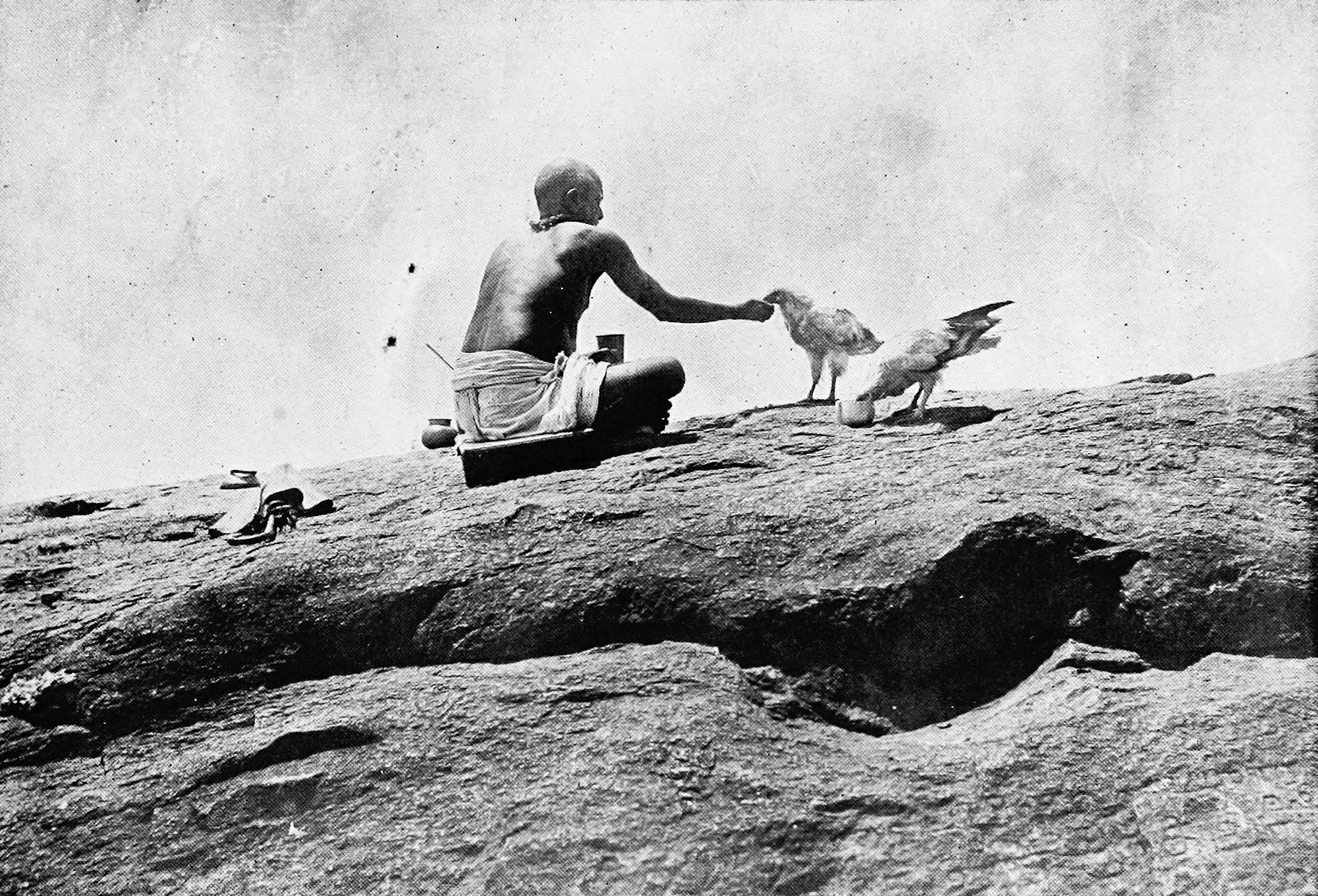
Sacred vultures fed by temple priests at Thirukalukundram, 1906

The word "Thirukazhukundram" comes from the Tamil words thiru (respectful), kazhugu (vulture/eagle), and kundram (mount). It was known as "Thirukazhugukundram" in ancient times, which later culminated into "Thirukazhukundram". The town is also known as "Pakshi-theertham" (Pakshi- bird; Theertham- holy lake) because of a pair of birds (most likely Egyptian vultures) that are believed to have visited the site for centuries. These birds are traditionally fed by the temple priests and arrive before noon to feed on offerings made from rice, wheat, ghee and sugar. Although punctual, the failure of the birds to turn up was attributed to the presence of "sinners" among the onlookers. Legend has it the vultures (or "eagles") represent eight sages who were punished by Shiva with two of them leaving in each of a series of epochs. It has also been known as Uruthrakodi, Nandipuri, Indrapuri, Narayanapuri, Brahmapuri, Dinakarapuri, and Muniganapuri in the past. There are many inscriptions in the temple.

== Legend ==
The sage Bharadwaja prayed to the god Shiva for a long life so that he could learn all the Vedas. Shiva appeared before him and granted him his wish to learn the Vedas and created three mountains, each signifying a Veda (Rig, Yajur and Sama). Shiva then took a handful of mud and said:

Dear Bharadwaja! The Vedas that you could learn are only this handful compared to the mountains present here, even if you live much longer, and hence, learning is never ending and possibly cannot be the route for salvation.

Shiva also said that in the Kali Yuga, the simplest and the surest way to salvation is bhakti, or unfettered devotion, service and love of God and his creations. It is believed that the hill on which the Vedagiriswarar temple is built, consists of the mountains signifying the Vedas created by Shiva himself. The name Vedagiriswarar means "the Lord of the Vedic Mountains" in Sanskrit.

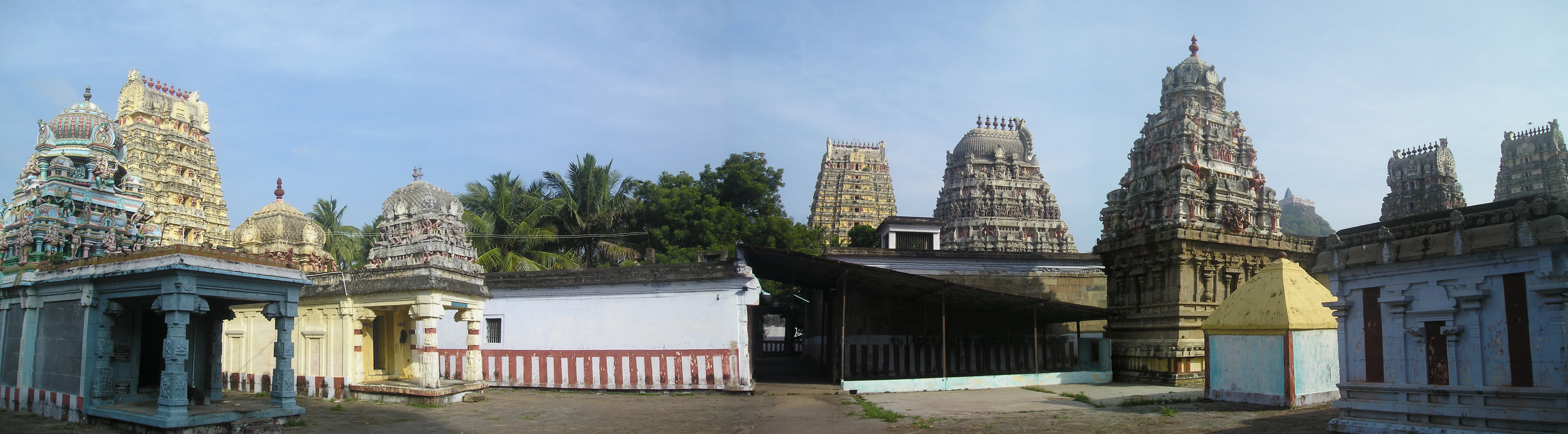
Panoramic view of the Tirupurasundari Amman Shrine at the foothills

== Poets ==
It is one of the 275 shrines known as Paadal Petra Sthalams. The four poet-saints (commonly called as Naalvar) Appar, Sundarar, Manickavasagar and Thirugnanasamandhar had visited the temple complex and composed hymns in praise of Vedagiriswarar. A shrine, Nalvar Koil, is dedicated to them. Arunagirinathar composed many of his hymns of Thirupugazh in Thirukazhukundram.

== Location ==
Thirukazhukundram is located on State Highway 58, 70 km away from Chennai and 15 km away from the famous tourist town Mahabalipuram. It is also 15 km away from Chengalpattu. Near road links are, 10 km away from Old Mahabalipuram Road, 10 km away from East Coast Road and 15 km away from GST road.

== Gallery ==
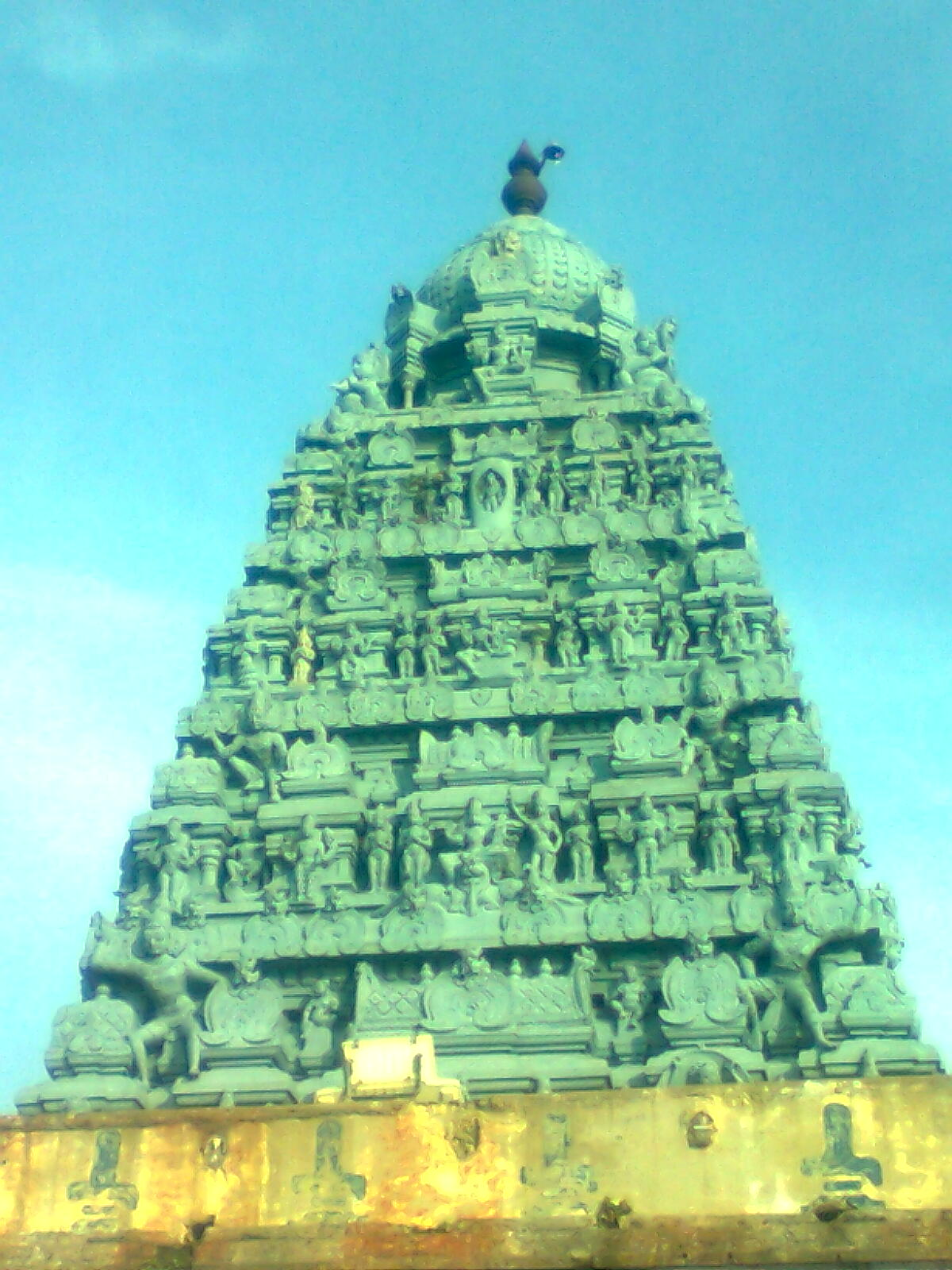
Main Gopuram of Hill temple of Thirukazhukundram

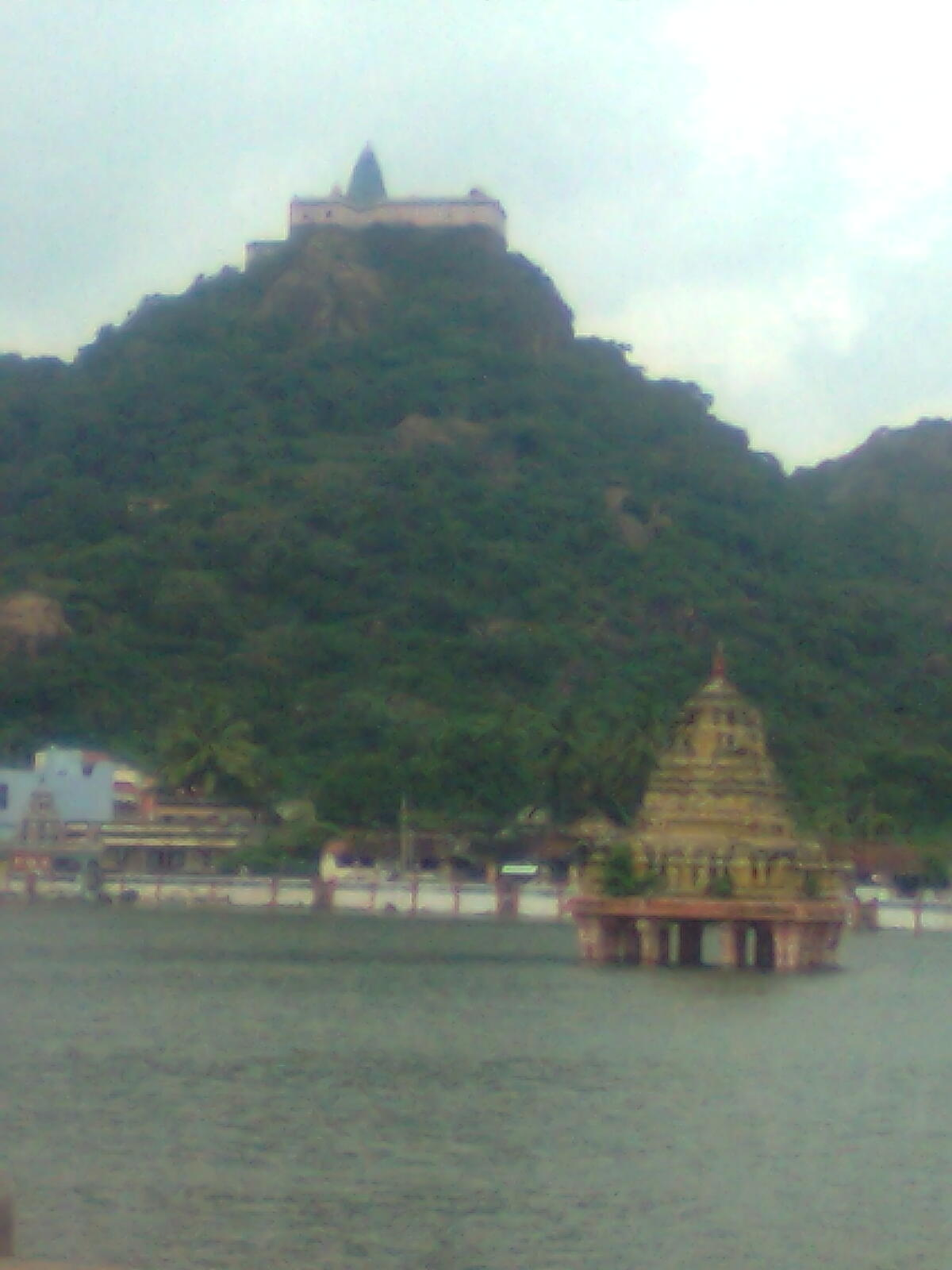
Sangu Theertham(conch tank) of Thirukazhukundram

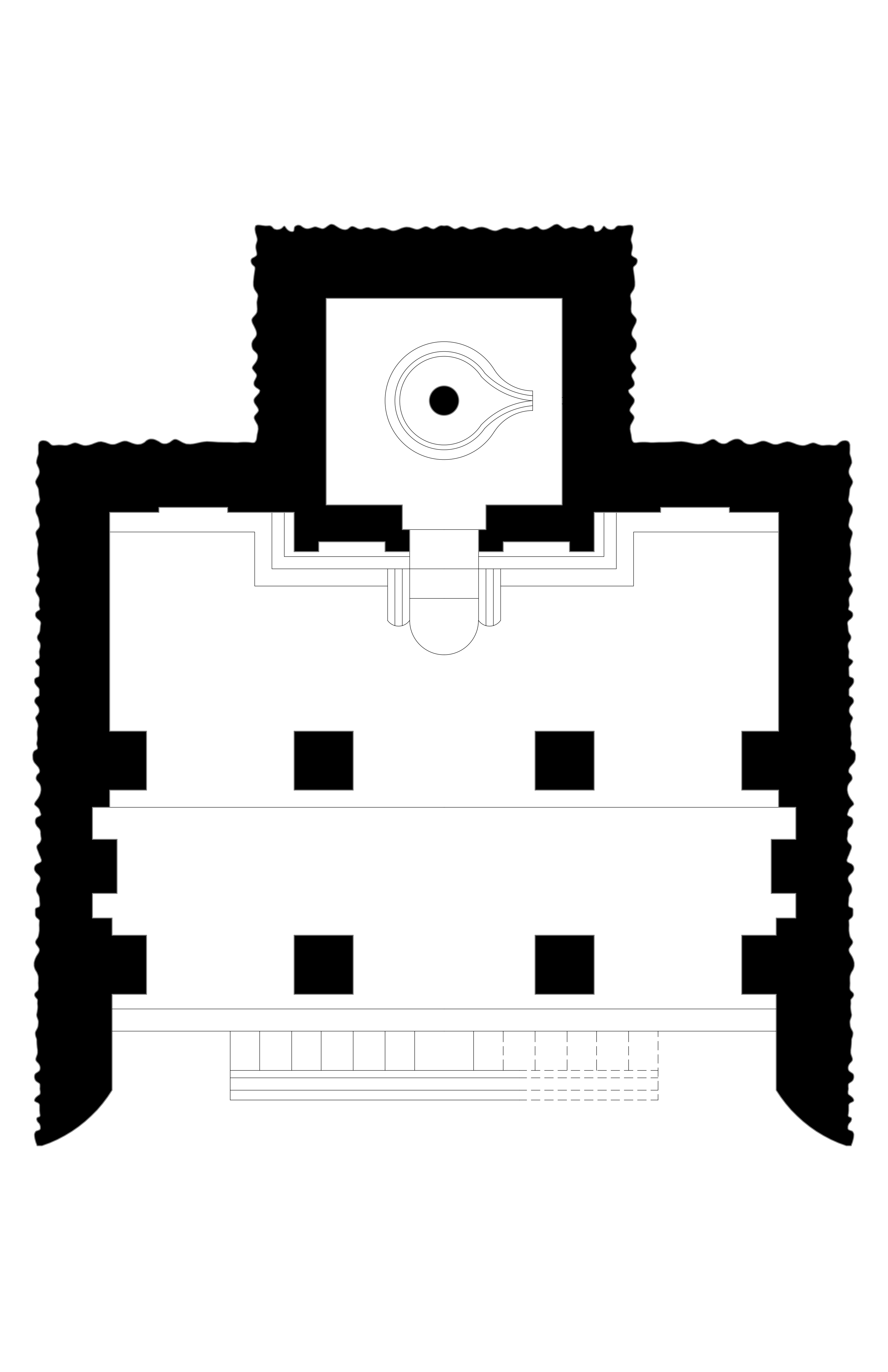
Orukal Mandapa (610-640 CE) is a Pallava-era rock-cut cave temple about 50 steps below Vedagiriswarar temple, east side of the hill.

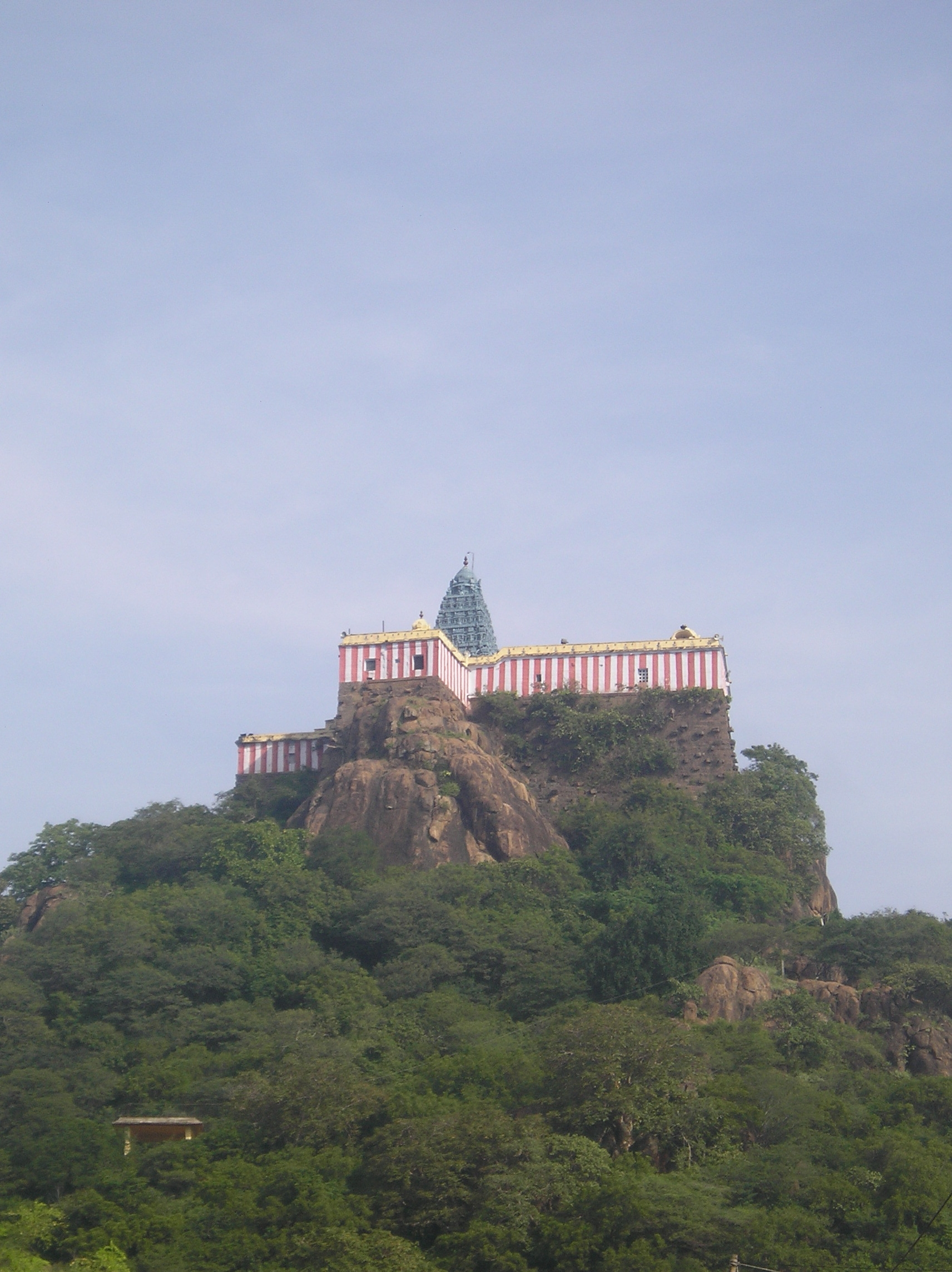
Temple view from foothills

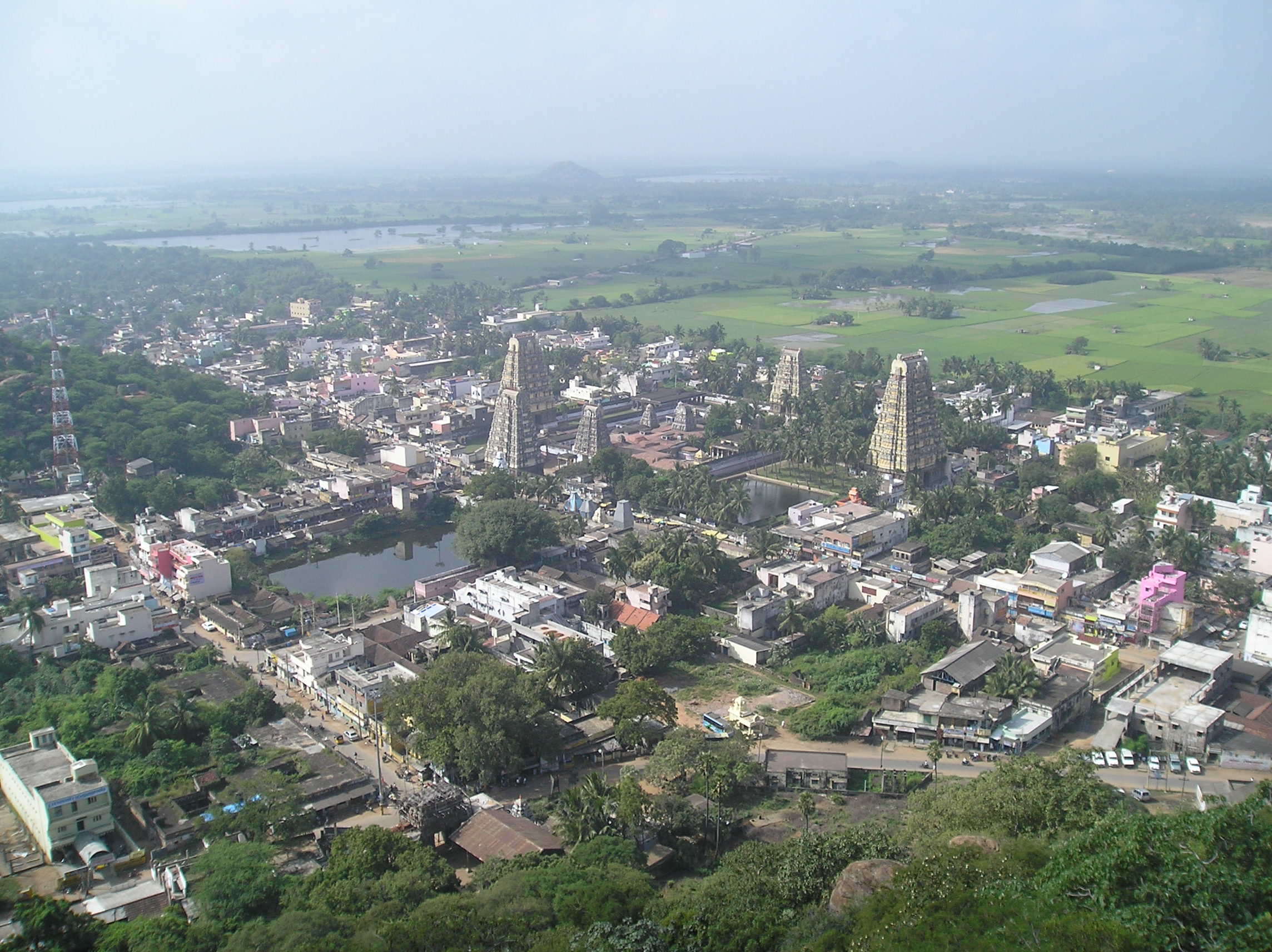
Basement temple view from the hill

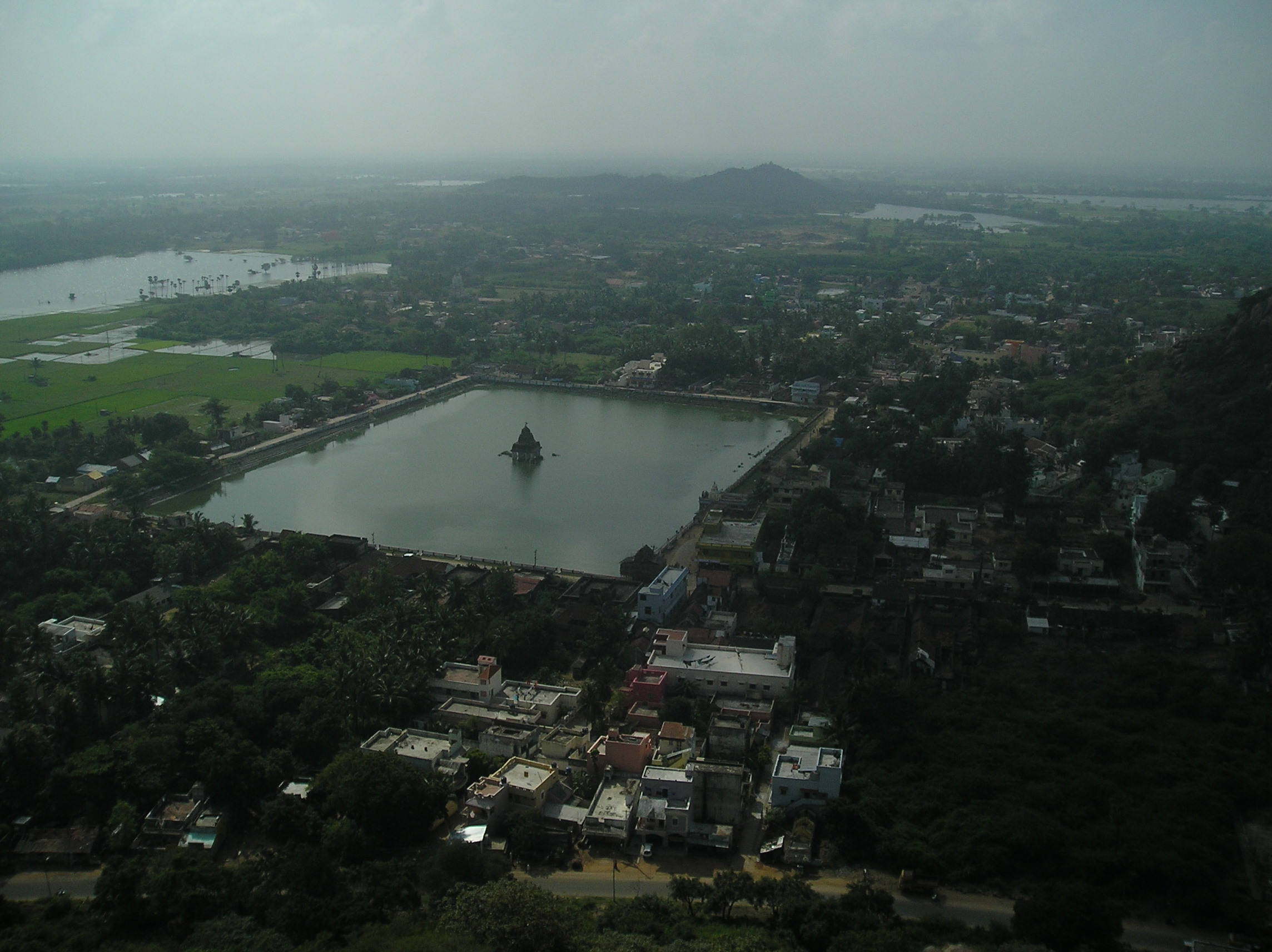
Sangu Theertham (conch tank) view

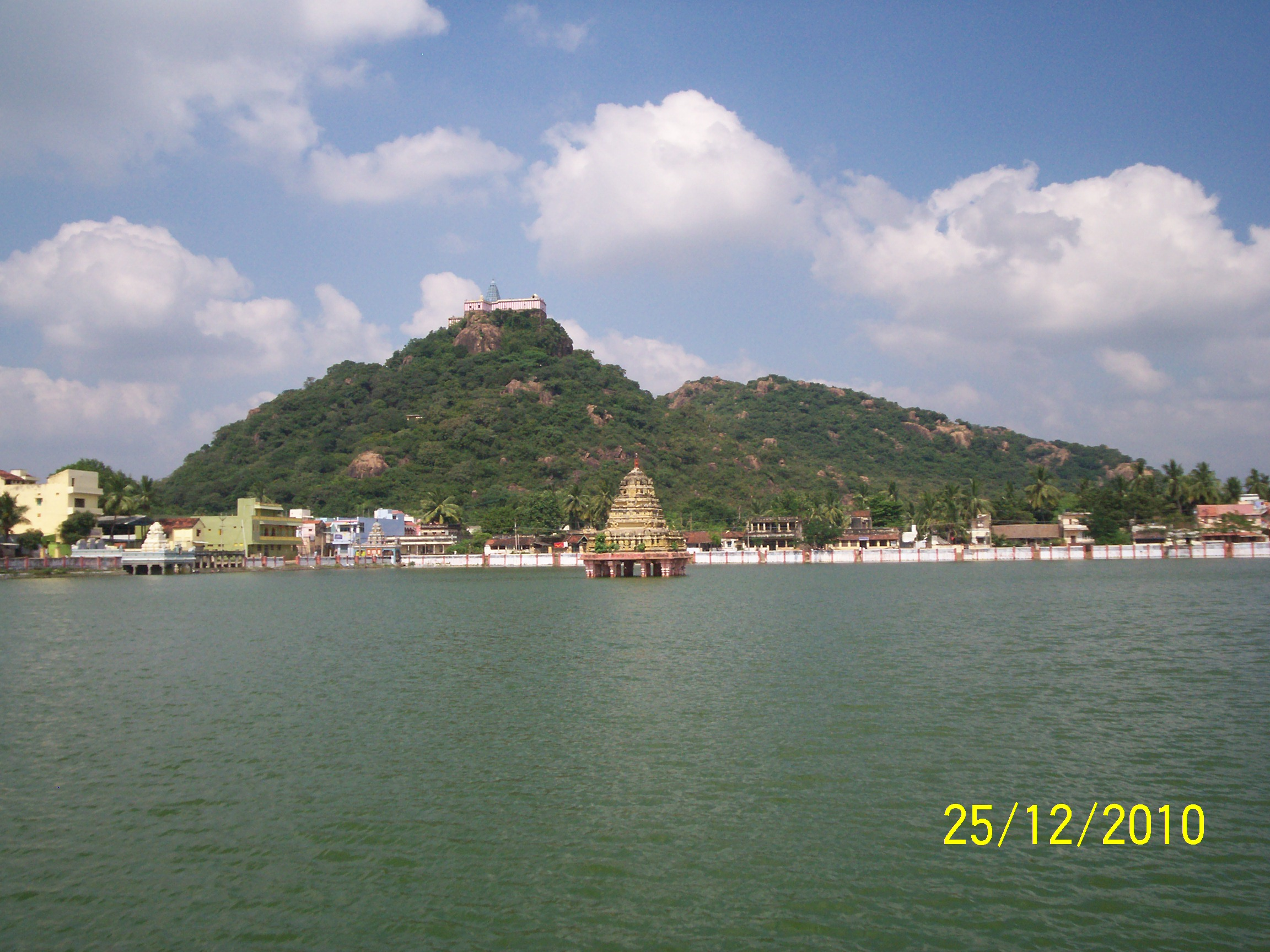
