= Kilambakkam railway station =

Railway station in Chennai, India

Kilambakkam Railway Station

General information
- Location: National Highway 32 - GST Road, Kilambakkam, Chennai, Tamil Nadu, India
- Coordinates: 12.8745°N 80.0766°E
- System: Indian Railways and Chennai Suburban Railway station
- Owner: Ministry of Railways, Indian Railways
- Lines: South and South West lines of Chennai Suburban Railway
- Platforms: 3
- Connections: Kilambakkam bus terminus Blue Line - Kilambakkam metro station(Proposed)

Construction
- Structure type: Standard on-ground station

Other information
- Fare zone: Southern Railways

History
- Opened: February 2026 (Tentative)

Services
Preceding station	Chennai Suburban	Following station
Vandalur towards Tambaram or Chennai Beach	South Line	Urapakkam towards Chengalpattu Junction or Villupuram Junction
Route map
Chennai Beach — Villupuram
Location

Kilambakkam railway station (station code:- ), also called Kalaignar Bus Terminus railway station is an under-construction Indian railway station in Chennai railway division of Southern Railway zone. The halt station is planned to serve the Chennai Beach–Chengalpattu section of the Chennai Suburban Railway Network, primarily catering to passengers utilizing the nearby Kilambakkam bus terminus.

== History ==
The plan for a new railway Station at Kilambakkam arose from the need to enhance connectivity for the newly established Kilambakkam bus terminus, a crucial transport hub for south-bound long-distance travel from Chennai aiming to offer last-mile connectivity to commuters.

With a funding of ₹20 crore provided by the Government of Tamil Nadu through CMDA, the Southern Railway started construction. The station is planned to be opened by February 2026.

== Developments ==
To further streamline passenger movement between the station and the bus terminus, the CMDA also plans for the construction of a skywalk to the station.

== See also ==
- Chennai Suburban Railway
- Railway stations in Chennai
