= Richard Benyon of Madras =

British merchant and colonial administrator (1698–1774)

Richard Benyon

President of Fort St George (Madras)
- In office 23 January 1735 – 14 January 1744
- Preceded by: George Morton Pitt
- Succeeded by: Nicholas Morse

Personal details
- Born: 1698
- Died: 1774 (aged 75–76)

Richard Benyon (1698–1774) was a British merchant and colonial administrator who served as the President of Madras from 23 January 1735 to 14 January 1744.

== Early career ==
Benyon first arrived in Madras as a writer in 1710. In 1718, he was nominated to the council of Fort St. George and served till 1725, when he resigned and returned to England. In 1732, he was nominated again as the second member of the council of Fort St. George. When George Morton Pitt resigned as President of Madras in 1735, Benyon, who was the most senior member in the council was appointed president in his stead.

== President of Madras ==
Benyon is regarded as one of the best Presidents of early Madras. He was one of the few early governors who was not convicted of any charges. During Benyon's tenure, the city saw rapid expansion. The villages of Perambur, Sadayankuppam, Ernavore, Pudupakkam and Vepery were acquired from the Nayak of Poonamallee in 1739.

The most important event of Benyon's tenure was the invasion of the Marathas who invaded South India twice, once in late 1740 and the second time, in May 1741. During the second invasion, the Maratha army under Raghoji Bhonsle invaded Trichinopoly, where the Carnatic general Chanda Sahib had set up his stronghold, while another occupied Fort St David, Porto-Novo and Sadras. However, following the successful conquest of Trichinopoly and the capture of Chanda Sahib, the Maratha troops relinquished their conquests and quickly withdrew. All through this period, Benyon tried to coerce the Maratha generals by sending them presents. The fortifications of Madras were strengthened and all British, Portuguese and Armenian citizens of the city were forcibly conscripted.

== Personal life ==
Benyon married twice at Fort St George, firstly to Mary Fleetwwod, daughter of Edward Fleetwood and secondly to Frances Davis, the daughter of Richard Horden and widow of Sandys Davis.

After his return to England, Benyon lived at Gidea Hall in Essex and Englefield House in Berkshire and married his third wife, Mary Tyssen, daughter of Rachel De Beauvoir and Francis Tyssen of Hackney, and the widow of Powlett Wright. He was the father with her of Richard Benyon, the Peterborough MP, and grandfather of Richard Benyon De Beauvoir, the philanthropist.

He died in 1774. There is a monument to him in St Margaret's Church, Margaretting, Essex.
