= Pudupakkam =

Village in Tamil Nadu, India

Coordinates: 12°55′N 79°40′E

Pudupakkam is a village near Chennai, India. It is closer to Siruseri SIPCOT. This village comes under Vandalur taluk of Chengalpattu district in Tamil Nadu. t has reputed Dr. Ambedkar Government Law College. The opening of an IT park in Siruseri, has led to an increase in apartments and villas in the region.

In the area, there is a Sri Veera Anjaneyar temple.

Pudupakkam is 16 km (9.9 mi) from Tambaram and 3 km (1.9 mi) from Kelambakkam.
