= Perungalathur railway station =

Railway station in Chennai, India

Perungalathur
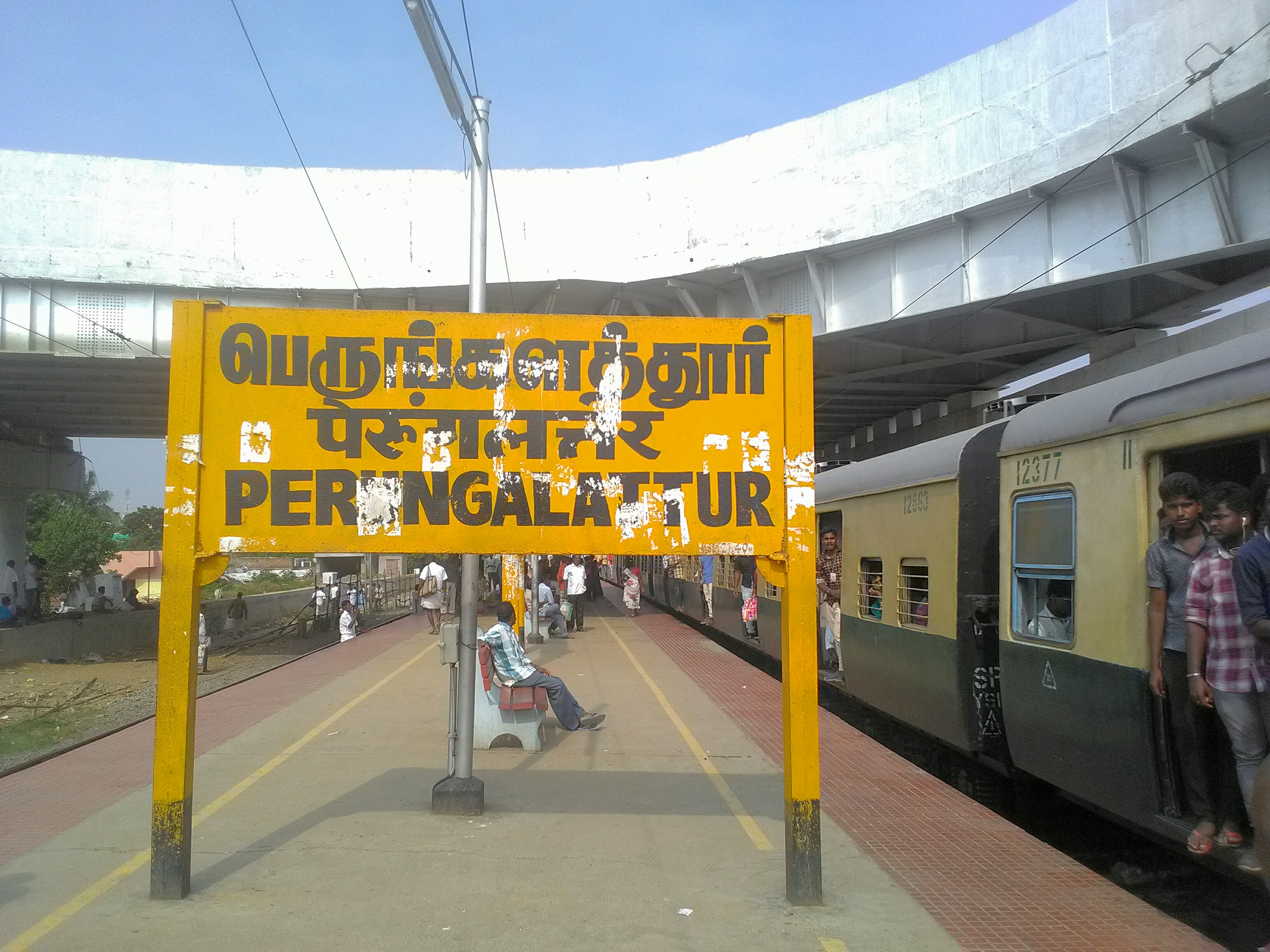

General information
- Location: NH-45, Perungalathur, Tambaram, Tamil Nadu 600 063, India
- Coordinates: 12°54′15″N 80°5′39″E
- System: Indian Railways and Chennai Suburban Railway station
- Owner: Ministry of Railways, Indian Railways
- Lines: South and South West lines of Chennai Suburban Railway
- Platforms: 2

Construction
- Structure type: Standard on-ground station
- Parking: Available

Other information
- Station code: PRGL
- Fare zone: Southern Railways

History
- Electrified: 9 January 1965
- Former names: South Indian Railway

Services
Preceding station	Chennai Suburban	Following station
Tambaram towards Tambaram or Chennai Beach	South Line	Vandalur towards Chengalpattu Junction or Villupuram Junction
Route map
Chennai Beach — Villupuram
Location

Perungalathur railway station (station code: PRGL) is an NSG–3 category Indian railway station in Chennai railway division of Southern Railway zone. It is one of the railway stations of the Chennai Beach–Chengelpet section of the Chennai Suburban Railway Network serving the neighbourhoods of Perungalathur and Peerkankaranai in southern Chennai. It is situated about 32 km (20 mi) from Chennai Beach and has an elevation of 26 m (85 ft) above sea level.

== History ==
The lines at the station were electrified on 9 January 1965, with the electrification of the Tambaram–Chengalpattu section.

== Layout ==
The station has two platforms which are being connected by the foot overbridge and 3 tracks. The platforms in the station can presently accommodate only 12-car rakes. In 2012, Southern Railway began renovating the station, including expansion of the platforms to accommodate 12-car rakes. There are two level crossings, namely, LC No. 32 on the northern end and LC No. 33 on the southern end, on either side of the station, a few metres away from the platforms. LC No. 32 comes within Peerkankaranai limits and LC No. 33 comes under the jurisdiction of Perungalathur. So the Railways has decided to build a mini platform to accommodate three coaches without closing either level crossings. This would be in use until both the level crossings are replaced by road over bridges.

=== Station layout ===
G	Street level	Exit/Entrance & ticket counter
P	FOB, Side platform | Doors will open on the left
P	Platform 1	Towards → Tambaram / Chennai Beach; Next Station: Tambaram
P	Platform 2	Towards → Tambaram / Chennai Beach
P	FOB, Island platform | P3 Doors will open on the left | P2 & P3 - (Express Lines)
P	Platform 3	Towards ← Chengalpattu Jn / Villuppuram Jn; Next Station: Vandalur
G	Street level	Exit/Entrance & ticket counter

== Traffic ==
As of 2012, 84 trains halt at the station and about 10,000 commuters use the station daily.

Per a traffic census conducted in March 2006, LC No. 32 witnessed a traffic flow of 861,000 train vehicle units and LC No. 33 witnessed 743,000 train vehicle units.

== Developments ==
In 2011, a road overbridge was planned to replace LC-32. The ramps of the overbridge would descend on the proposed ₹ 500-million Eastern Bypass project connecting Velachery Main Road at Rajakilpakkam and GST Road near the station. A pedestrian subway was also planned to replace LC-33.

== Accidents ==
As of 2012, an average of at least five people are killed on the track every month at the station.

== See also ==
- Chennai Suburban Railway
- Railway stations in Chennai
