= Thirupporur block =

The Thirupporur block is a revenue block in the Chengalpattu district of Tamil Nadu, India. It has a total of 50 panchayat villages.
