= Lathur block =

The Lathur block is a revenue block in the Chengalpattu district of Tamil Nadu, India. It has a total of 41 panchayat villages.
