= Edaikazhinadu =

- Town
- Location in Tamil Nadu, India
- Coordinates: 12°19′53″N 80°02′01″E
- Country: India
- State: Tamil Nadu
- District: Chengalpattu

Government
  - Type: State Government
  - Body: Town Panchayat
  - Chairman: Samyuktha Iyyanar Edaikazhinadu

Population (2001)
  - Total: 25,769

Languages
  - Official: Tamil
- Time zone: UTC+5:30 (IST)
- PIN: 603 304
- Vehicle registration: TN 19 Y

Edaikazhinadu is a panchayat town in Chengalpattu district in the state of Tamil Nadu, India. Nearby villages are Vennangupattu and Kadappakkam. Alamparai fort, a 17th-century historical fort, is located in this region.

== Demographics ==
As of 2001 India census, Edakalinadu had a population of 25,769. Males constitute 49% of the population and females 51%. Edakalinadu has an average literacy rate of 60%, higher than the national average of 59.5%: male literacy is 69%, and female literacy is 51%. In Edakalinadu, 12% of the population is under 6 years of age.

== Banks ==
Edaikazhinadu is serviced by branches of Indian Bank and Tamil Nadu Grama Bank.

== Hospitals ==
The town has one primary government health care, with 2 doctors working in shifts and few support staffs.

== Industries ==
Hollow block manufacturers, fish net manufacturing company, wood furniture companies, and aqua companies are the major industries in this town.

== Boat house ==
Rain drop boat house, situated in Muttukadu (Nainarkuppam) is a tourist spot in Edaikazhinadu.
