= Chithamur block =

Revenue block in Tamil Nadu, India

The Chithamur block is a revenue block in the Chengalpattu district of Tamil Nadu, India. It has a total of 43 panchayat villages.
