= Nandivaram-Guduvancheri =

- municipality
- Location in Tamil Nadu, India
- Coordinates: 12.8440°N 80.0610°E
- Country: India
- State: Tamil Nadu
- District: Chengalpattu
- Metro: Chennai metropolitan area

Area
  - Total: 8.5 km^{2} (3.3 sq mi)

Population (2011)
  - Total: 44,098
  - Density: 5,200/km^{2} (13,000/sq mi)

Languages
  - Official: Tamil
- Time zone: UTC+5:30 (IST)
- PIN: 603202
- Telephone code: 91-44
- Vehicle registration: TN-19 AE

Nandivaram-Guduvancheri is a municipality located in Chennai Metropolitan City in Chengalpattu district in the Indian state of Tamil Nadu. It is lies in the southern part of Chennai metropolitan area.

== Demographics ==
As of 2011 India census, Nandivaram-Guduvancheri had a population of 44,098. Males constitute 51% of the population and females 49%. Nandivaram-Guduvancheri has an average literacy rate of 79%, higher than the national average of 59.5%: male literacy is 85%, and female literacy is 74%. In Nandivaram-Guduvancheri, 10% of the population is under 6 years of age

== Schools & Education ==
- Government Boys Higher Secondary School Nandhivaram
- Government High School Karanaipuducherry
- Bharathiyar Matriculation School
- Panchayat Union Primary School Nandivaram
- Kamarajapuram Primary School Nandivaram
- Govt Girls Higher secondary school
- SRM Public school
- Velammal Vidhyashram School
- HolySai International school
- Neelan matriculation school
- St John's matriculation school

== Apartments ==
- Urbanrise Jubilee Residences
- Lancor Lumina
- Shambhavi Apartments
- SB Homes
- Shriram Shankari Apartments
- SIS Queenstown
- XS Real Viva City
- Sri SaiBaba Nagar Karanaipuducherry

== Hospitals ==
- Government Hospital, Guduvancheri-Nandivaram
- Deepam Hospital
