= Tirukalukundram =

Tirukalukundram Tirukazhukundram
- Panchayat town
- Tirukallhukundram, Chengalpattu, Tamil Nadu
- Coordinates: 12°36′33″N 80°04′03″E
- Country: India
- State: Tamil Nadu
- District: Chengalpattu

Area
  - Total: 11.2 km^{2} (4.3 sq mi)
- Elevation: 53.65 m (176.0 ft)

Population (2011)
  - Total: 29,391
  - Density: 2,620/km^{2} (6,800/sq mi)

Language
  - Official: Tamil
- Time zone: UTC+5:30 (IST)
- PIN: 603109
- Vehicle registration: TN-19

Tirukalukundram (Tamil: திருக்கழுக்குன்றம், romanized: tirukkaḻukkuṉṟam), also known as Tirukazhukundram, is a panchayat town and taluk head of Tirukalukundram taluk in Chengalpattu district in the Indian state of Tamil Nadu. It is famous for the Vedagiriswarar_Temple, a Hindu temple dedicated to Shiva.

== Etymology ==
The name Tirukkalukkunram (also spelled Tirukazhukundram) is derived from the Tamil word கழுகு, kazhughu, meaning 'eagle, kite'. The Tamil prefix Tiru signifies 'holy' or 'sacred', a common honorific used for temple towns across Tamil Nadu. The town's name, 'hill of the sacred kites', refers to the ridge where the main temple is located, atop a 500-foot (150 m) hill.

== History ==
Tirukazhukundram is renowned for a legend associated with its hilltop Shiva temple. According to the myth, two eagles (or kites) visited the temple every day at noon to receive food from the temple priest, who performed this ritual daily. These birds were believed to be transformed rishis (sages) under a curse, and their daily visits were considered a divine occurrence. However, the legend foretells that these eagles would stop coming during the Kali Yuga, marking the beginning of the current age of degradation. In recent years, the eagles have not been sighted, leading many to believe that the Kali Yuga has indeed begun.

== Temple and religious significance ==
The temple atop the hill is dedicated to Shiva and is a significant place of pilgrimage. Pilgrims from all over the region visit the temple, especially during festivals. The site is also home to a tank known as pakshitīrtham (meaning 'bathing place of the birds'), which is believed to have healing powers. According to local tradition, a plunge into the tank cures various ailments, including leprosy.

Interestingly, there is no Nandi (the sacred bull and traditional vehicle of Shiva) at the hilltop temple. It is said that Nandi refused to step on the hill, as the entire hill itself is considered to be a manifestation of Lord Shiva. Instead, Nandi is worshiped at the foothills, where it "stayed back."

According to early records, the two sacred kites or eagles were said to have originally come from Varanasi. The ritual of feeding the birds was performed by a pandāram (priest) at the hilltop temple. This tradition was observed until recent decades when the birds ceased their visits.

== Demographics ==
In the 2011 India census, Tirukalukundram had a population of 29,391. Males constitute 50% of the population and females 50%. Tirukalukundram has an average literacy rate of 72%, lower than the national average of 74.04%: male literacy is 80%, and female literacy is 65%. In Tirukalukundram, 11% of the population is under 6 years of age.

== Location ==
Thirukazhukundram is located on State Highway 58 between Chennai and Thiruttani, 15 kilometres (9.3 mi) from the tourist town of Mahabalipuram. It lies 10 kilometres (6.2 mi) from Old Mahabalipuram Road, 10 kilometres (6.2 mi) from East Coast Road, and 15 kilometres (9.3 mi) from GST road.

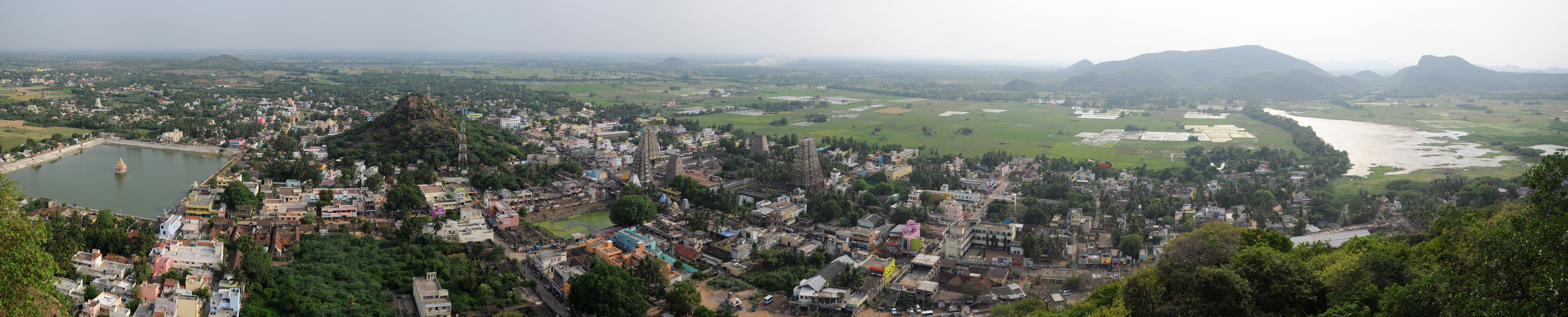
Panorama of Tirukalukundram village showing temple complex and water tanks.
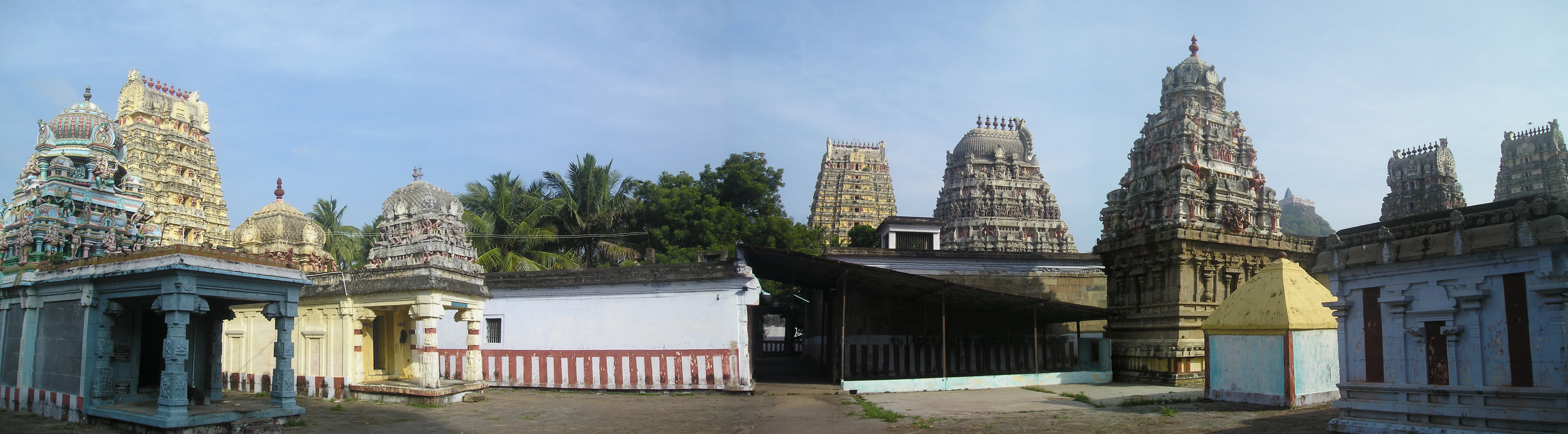
Shri Tirupura Sundari, another large Shiva temple.

== Cultural references ==
In the Tamil science fiction thriller film 2.0 (2018), the story partially takes place in Thirukazhukundram.
