= Tirukalukundram taluk =

Taluk of Chengalpattu district

Thirukalukundram
- Taluk
- Thirukalukundram

Area
  - Total: 709.64 km^{2} (273.99 sq mi)

Population (2011)
  - Total: 238,244
  - Density: 335.73/km^{2} (869.52/sq mi)

Tirukalukundram taluk or Thirukalukundram taluk (Tamil: திருக்கழுகுன்றம் வட்டம்) is a taluk of Chengalpattu district of the Indian state of Tamil Nadu. The sacred town, Tirukalukundram is the present taluk headquarters. Formerly, the headquarters of the taluk was the town of Chengalpattu, which is a now a Taluk head of the newly formed namesake Taluk.

== Demographics ==
According to the 2011 census, the taluk of Tirukalukundram had a population of 238,244.

== History ==
This taluk was earlier, a part of the Kanchipuram district until the district was bifurcated and a new Chengalpattu district was created. It is famous for mara sekku machine oil like kadalai ennai, nallaennai and many types of oil with moderate cost for buying.

== Administration ==
The taluk is administered by the Tahsildar office located in Tirukalukundram.
