= Agaramthen =

- Village
- Country: India
- State: Tamil Nadu
- District: Kancheepuram

Area
  - Total: 3.8219 km^{2} (1.4756 sq mi)

Population (2011)
  - Total: 4,172
  - Density: 1,092/km^{2} (2,827/sq mi)

Languages
  - Official: Tamil
- Time zone: UTC+5:30
- PIN: 600073

Agaramthen is a village located in the Tambaram, Chennai taluka of Kancheepuram district in the Indian state of Tamil Nadu. This village is under the administrative control of the Thiruvencheri gram panchayat.

== Demographics ==
In 2011, Agaramthen had a population of 4,172, being 2,064 males and 2,108 females. The literacy rate was 74.23%, with 77.66% of males and 70.87% of females being literate. The village comprised approximately 1,059 households.

== Economy ==
The village's primary economic activities are closely tied to the nearest town, Chennai Tambaram, which is approximately nine kilometers away.

== Land disputes ==
In recent years, Agaramthen has been at the center of a controversy related to land grabbing. Land that was part of a lake in Agaramthen was allotted to two people in the 1990s. This issue came to light when the owner of one of these properties had a boundary dispute, leading revenue officials to scrutinize the land records. They found out that the land was assigned by the government in 1991 and 1997, and belonged to the Periya Eri Lake in Agaramthen. After a probe, the officials cancelled the pattas (land ownership documents) for both land parcels, and the landowners are set to lose their properties. As a result, steps have been initiated to recover the land.
