= Madurantakam block =

Coordinates: 12.5101°N 79.8849°E

The Madurantakam block is a revenue block in the Chengalpattu district of Tamil Nadu, India. It has a total of 58 panchayat villages.
