= Sholinganallur taluk =

Human settlement in India

Sholinganallur
- Taluk
- Interactive map of Sholinganallur

Area
  - Total: 116 km^{2} (45 sq mi)

Population (2011)
  - Total: 548,654
  - Density: 4,730/km^{2} (12,300/sq mi)

Sholinganallur taluk is a taluk of the district of Chennai in the Indian state of Tamil Nadu. It was created in 2009 by the trifurcation of Tambaram taluk in Chennai district. The centre of the taluk is the neighbourhood of Sholinganallur. The headquarters of its Guindy division. On 4 January 2018, Chennai district was expanded by annexing Sholinganallur taluk.

== Demographics ==
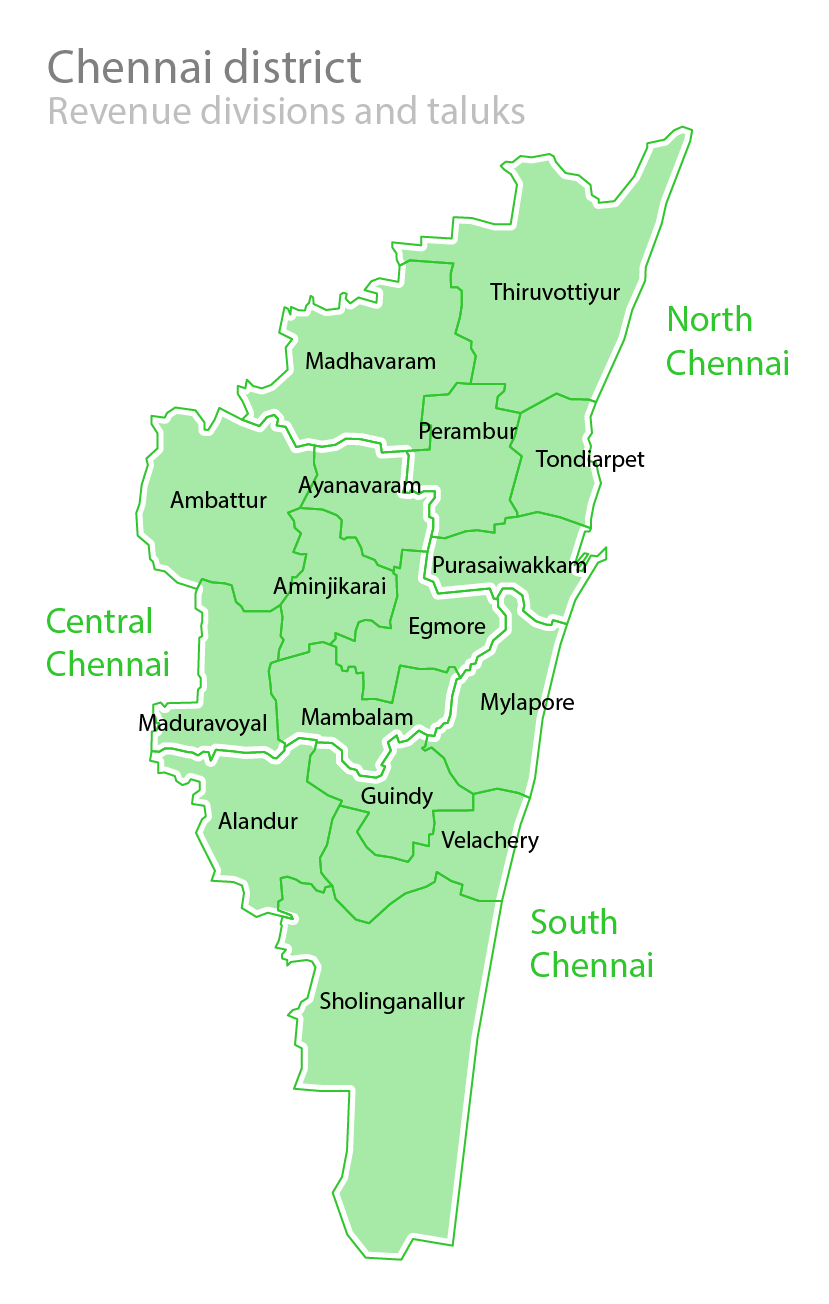
Sholinganallur depicted on a map of the Chennai revenue districts

According to the 2011 census, the taluk had a population of 548,654 with 276,828 males and 271,826 females. There were 982 women for every 1,000 men. The literacy rate was 81.23%. Child population in the age group below 6 was 28,905 males and 27,521 females.

== Revenue Villages ==
- Pallikaranai Firka
1. Karapakkam
2. Madipakkam
3. Madipakkam-B
4. Okkiyam Thoraibakkam
5. Pallikaranai
6. Perungudi
7. Seevaram
8. Ullagaram
- Sholinganallur Firka
1. Chemmancheri
2. Cholinganallur-1
3. Chozhinganallur-2
4. Enchambakkam
5. Jaladampettai
6. Kottivakkam
7. Neelangarai
8. Palavaakkam
9. Utthandi

All of the above revenue villages are under Chennai city except for Madipakkam-B which has revenue and disaster management under Zone-14 (Puzhutivakkam) of Greater Chennai Corporation but Local body administration under wards 3, 4 and 5 of Kovilambakkam rural village panchayat.
