= Vandalur railway station =

Railway station in Chennai, India

Vandalur
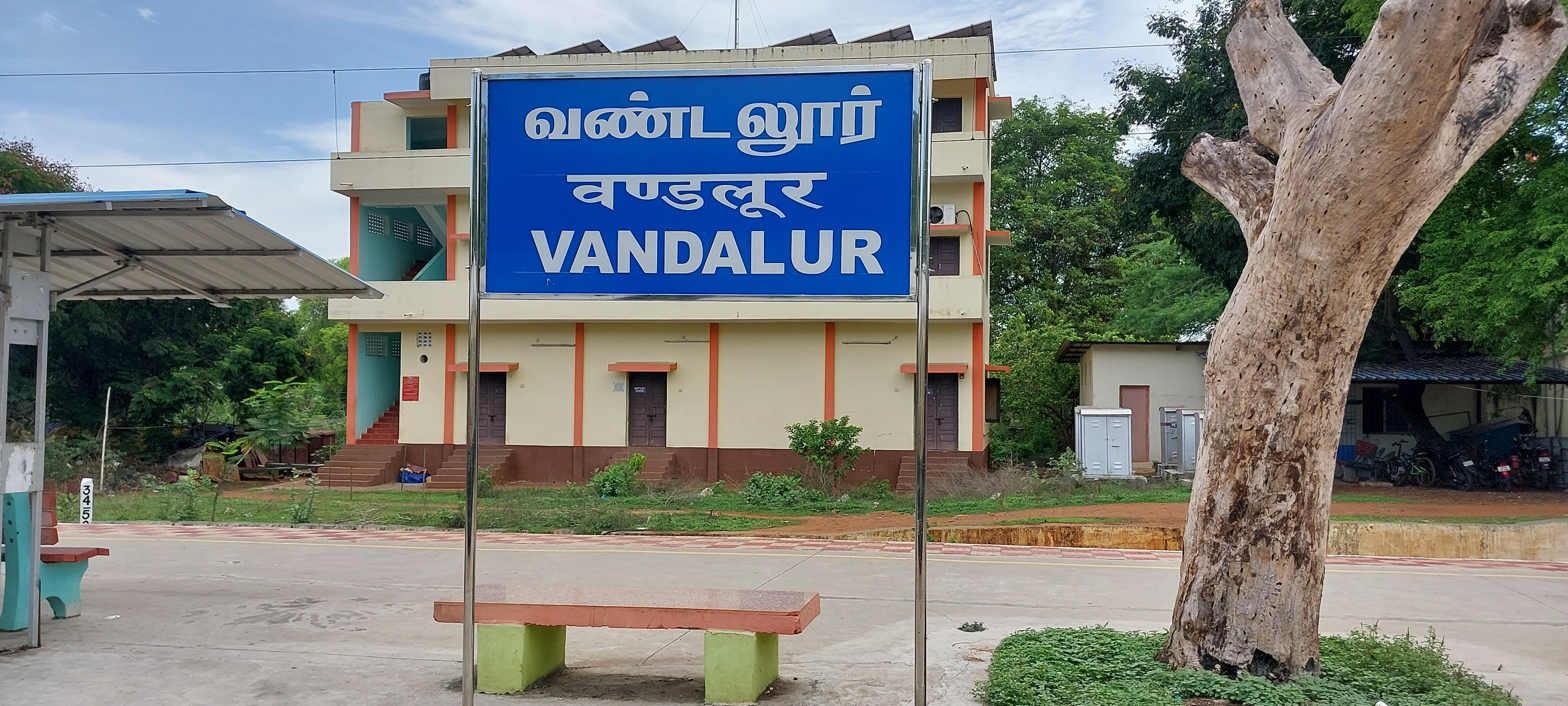
- Vandalur railway station

General information
- Location: National Highway 32, Vandalur, Chennai, Tamil Nadu, India
- Coordinates: 12.8911°N 80.0845°E
- System: Indian Railways and Chennai Suburban Railway station
- Owner: Ministry of Railways, Indian Railways
- Lines: South and South West lines of Chennai Suburban Railway
- Platforms: 3
- Tracks: 4

Construction
- Structure type: Standard on-ground station
- Depth: 0
- Platform levels: 1
- Parking: Available

Other information
- Station code: VDR
- Fare zone: Southern Railways

History
- Electrified: 9 January 1965
- Former names: South Indian Railway

Services
Preceding station	Chennai Suburban	Following station
Perungalathur towards Tambaram or Chennai Beach	South Line	Kilambakkam towards Chengalpattu Junction or Villupuram Junction
Route map
Chennai Beach — Villupuram
Location

Vandalur railway station (station code: VDR) is an NSG–5 category Indian railway station in Chennai railway division of Southern Railway zone. It is one of the railway stations of the Chennai Beach–Chengalpattu section of the Chennai Suburban Railway Network. It serves the neighbourhood of Vandalur, a suburb of Chennai. It is situated at a distance of 34 km (21 mi) from Chennai Beach junction and is located on NH 45 in Vandalur, with an elevation of 37 m (121 ft) above sea level.

== History ==
The lines at the station were electrified on 9 January 1965, with the electrification of the Tambaram—Chengalpattu section.

== The station ==
=== Platforms ===
There are a total of 3 platforms and 3 tracks. The platforms are connected by foot overbridge. These platforms are built to accumulate 24 coaches express train. The platforms are equipped with modern facility like display board of arrival and departure of trains.

=== Station layout ===
P	Platform 1	Towards → Tambaram / Chennai Beach; Next Station: Perungalathur
P	FOB, Island platform | P2 (Express Line) | P1 Doors will open on the right
P	Platform 2	Towards → Tambaram / Chennai Egmore
P	Platform 3	Towards ← Chengalpattu Junction / Villuppuram Jn; Next Station: Kilambakkam
P	FOB, Side platform | P3 (Express and MEMU Lines) | P3 Doors will open on the right
G	Street level Note:	Exit/Entrance & ticket counter (To have a station halt at Kilambakkam in the future)

== See also ==
- Chennai Suburban Railway
- Railway stations in Chennai
