= Tamil Nadu Urban Habitat Development Board =

Indian state body tasked with improving slums in Tamil Nadu

- Type: Public Sector Undertaking
- Industry: Slum clearance, Housing, Rehabilitation of Tsunami
- Founded: July 1, 1970 by Chief minister M. Karunanidhi
- Headquarters: Chennai, Tamil Nadu, India
- Area served: Tamil Nadu, India
- Website: http://www.tnuhdb.tn.gov.in/

Tamil Nadu Urban Habitat Development Board (TNUDB), formerly known as Tamil Nadu Slum Clearance Board, is administrated by Government of Tamil Nadu to remove slums in the state. It was formed by Tamil Nadu Slum Areas (Improvement & Clearance) Act 1971. The main function of the board is to eradicate slums and provide hygienic tenements in Tamil Nadu.

== Background ==
The Board was created in September 1970 with the goal of improving the living conditions of slum residents in Tamil Nadu via numerous Housing, Slum Development, Rehabilitation, and Resettlement initiatives. The Board's operations began in Chennai and were progressively expanded to other metropolitan regions of Tamil Nadu beginning in 1984.

== History ==
Under Chief Minister M Karunanidhi, the Tamil Nadu Slum Clearance Board was formed in September 1970 with the goal of making Chennai slum-free by 2023. It was the first such board in the country. With 1,536 home units, Kesava Pillai Park in Pulianthope, Egmore, initially opened to the public in 1980. In 2008, the TNSCB demolished outdated buildings and began construction on new ones.

Chief Minister M.K. Stalin in September 2021 changed the name of Tamil Nadu Slum Clearance Board to Tamil Nadu Urban Habitat Development Board.
