= Madurantakam taluk =

Human settlement in India

Coordinates: 12.5101°N 79.8849°E

Madurantakam taluk is a taluk of Chengalpattu district of the Indian state of Tamil Nadu. The headquarters of the taluk is the town of Madurantakam. Madurantakam taluk is bounded by Chengalpattu taluk in north, Uthiramerur taluk of Kanchipuram district in West, Thirukklaukkundram Taluk in north east and Tindivanam lauk of Villupuram district in south.

== History ==
Madurantakam taluk was previously a part of the Kanchipuram district. After the bifurcation of Kanchipuram district, Madurantakam taluk became a part of the Chengalpattu district.

== Geography ==
Madurantakam taluk is geographically lies in Kiliar river basin.

== Demographics ==
According to the 2011 census, the taluk of Madurantakam had a population of 272,669 with 136,299 males and 136,370 females. There were 1,001 women for every 1,000 men. The taluk had a literacy rate of 67.59%. Child population in the age group below 6 was 13,193 Males and 12,787 Females.

== Administration ==
The taluk is administered by the Tahsildar office located in Madurantakam.

== See also ==
- Orathy
