= Vandalur taluk =

Vandalur
- Taluk
- Vandalur

Area
  - Total: 175.14 km^{2} (67.62 sq mi)

Population (2011)
  - Total: 321,003
  - Density: 1,832.8/km^{2} (4,747.0/sq mi)

Vandalur taluk is a taluk located in south of the metropolitan city of Chennai, Chengalpattu district of the Indian state of Tamil Nadu. The headquarters of the taluk is the town of Vandalur.

== History ==
Vandalur taluk was previously a part of the Kanchipuram district. After the bifurcation of Kanchipuram district, Vandalur taluk became a part of the Chengalpattu district.

== Administration ==
The taluk is administered by the Tahsildar office located in Vandalur. The revenue officers from Chengalpattu manage the revenue collection.
