= Tambaram taluk =

Taluk of Chengalpattu district, Tamil Nadu, India

Tambaram
- Taluk
- Tambaram
- Interactive map of Tambaram

Area
  - Total: 99.08 km^{2} (38.26 sq mi)

Population (2011)
  - Total: 464,297
  - Density: 4,686/km^{2} (12,140/sq mi)

Tambaram taluk, located in Chengalpattu district of Tamil Nadu, India, is part of the Tambaram Revenue Division, with its administrative center situated in the city of Tambaram.

== History ==
Tambaram taluk was previously a part of the Kanchipuram district. After the bifurcation of Kanchipuram district, Tambaram taluk became a part of the Chengalpattu district.

== Demographics ==
According to the 2011 census, the taluk of Tambaram had a population of 464,297

== Administration ==
The taluk is administered by the Tahsildar office located in Tambaram.
