= Chengalpattu district =

- District
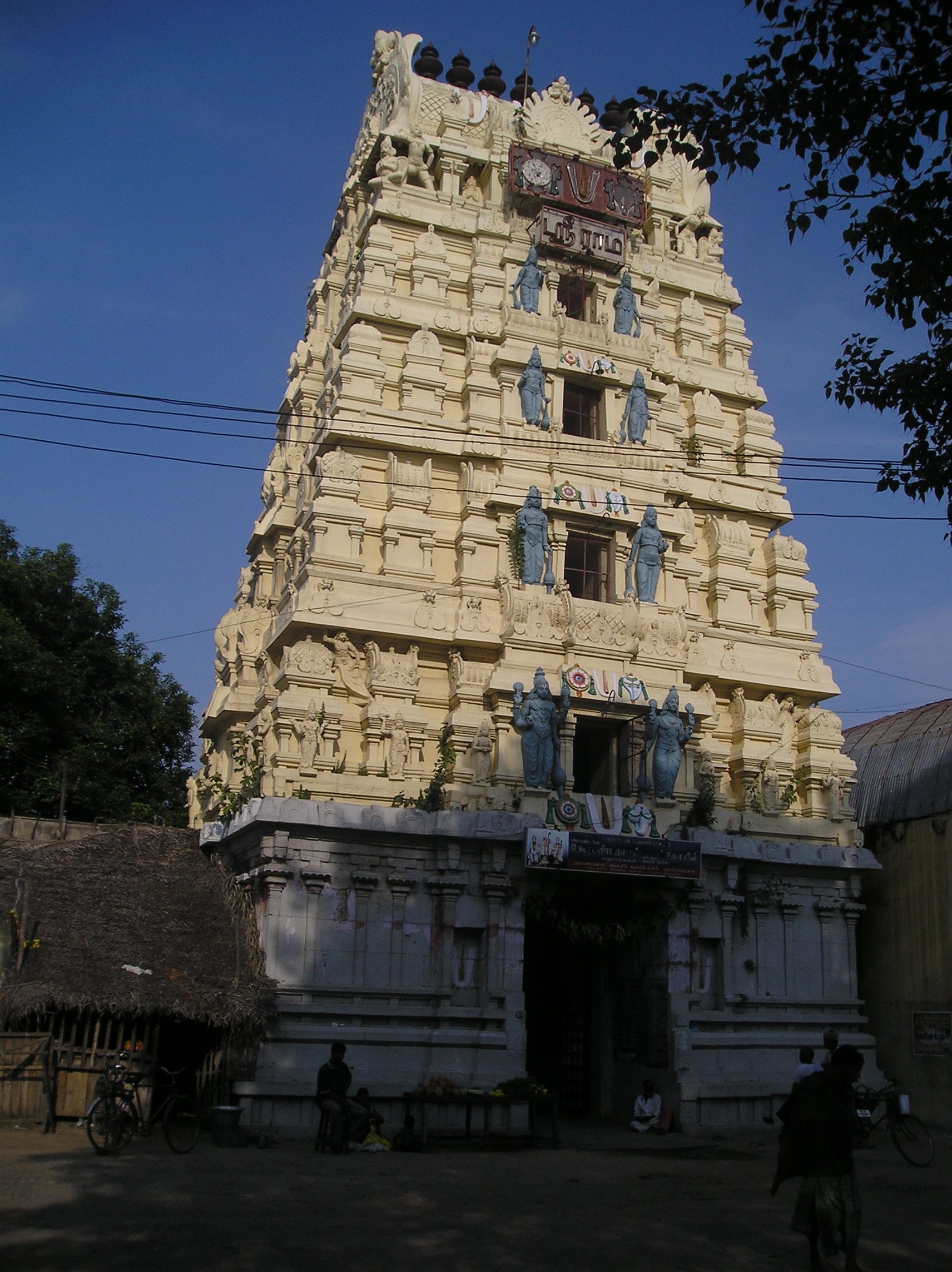
- Eri-Katha Ramar Temple, one of the most famous temples of the district
- Nickname: Chengai District
- Chengalpattu district in Tamil Nadu
- Country: India
- State: Tamil Nadu
- Region: Tondai Nadu
- Subdivisions: Revenue divisions (3): Tambaram, Chengalpattu, Madurantakam; Taluks (8): Chengalpattu, Pallavaram, Cheyyur, Madurantakam, Tambaram, Thiruporur, Tirukalukundram, Vandalur; Firkas: 40; Revenue villages: 636
- Urban local bodies: Corporation (1): Tambaram; Municipalities (4): Chengalpattu, Maraimalai Nagar, Nandivaram-Guduvancheri, Madurantakam
- Established: 29 November 2019
- Founder: Edappadi K. Palaniswami
- Named for: Chengalpet town
- Headquarters: Chengalpattu
- Largest City: Tambaram

Government
  - Type: District administration
  - Body: Chengalpattu District Collectorate
  - District collector: Dr. M. Veerappan, IAS
  - Collector appointment date: 29 May 2026
  - Superintendent of police: Ayman Jamal, IPS
  - SP appointment date: 4 March 2026

Area
  - Total: 2,945 km^{2} (1,137 sq mi)

Population (2011)
  - Total: 2,556,423
  - Estimate (2020): 3,431,317
  - Rank: 8th
  - Density: 868.1/km^{2} (2,248/sq mi)

Languages
  - Official: Tamil
  - Minority: Telugu,English
- Time zone: UTC+5:30 (IST)
- PIN: 603XXX,600XXX
- Telephone code: 044
- Vehicle registration: TN-19, TN-14, TN-22, TN-85 and TN-11
- Nominal GDP (2022-23): ₹203,172.23 crore (US$25.85 billion)
- Per capita income (2022-23): ₹746,994 (US$9,503.2)
- Website: chengalpattu.nic.in

Chengalpattu district is one of the 38 districts of Tamil Nadu, India. The district headquarters is located at Chengalpattu. Chengalpattu district came into existence on 29 November 2019 when it was carved out of Kanchipuram district after the announcement about the bifurcation of districts on 18 July 2019.

== Administration ==
Chengalpattu District is divided into three revenue divisions and eight taluks. Taluks within the Tambaram and Chengalpattu Revenue Divisions fall within the Chennai Metropolitan Area.

Revenue divisions and taluks
| Revenue division | Taluks |
|---|---|
| Tambaram | Pallavaram taluk, Tambaram taluk, Vandalur taluk |
| Chengalpattu | Chengalpattu taluk, Thiruporur taluk, Tirukalukundram taluk |
| Madurantakam | Madurantakam taluk, Cheyyur taluk |

=== Local government ===
Urban local bodies
| Classification | Count | Entities |
|---|---|---|
| City municipal corporation | 1 | Tambaram City Municipal Corporation |
| Municipalities | 5 | Chengalpattu, Maraimalai Nagar, Nandivaram-Guduvancheri, Madurantakam, Mamallapuram (upgraded on 12 August 2024) |
| Proposed municipalities | 2 | Thiruporur, Tirukalukundram |
| Town panchayats | 5 | Acharapakkam, Edaikazhinadu, Karunguzhi, Thiruporur, Tirukalukundram |
| Proposed town panchayats | 9 | Vandalur, Navalur, Siruseri, Kelambakkam, Melmaruvathur, Cheyyur, Lathur, Chithamur, Kalpakkam |
| Cantonment boards | 1 | St.Thomas Mount cum Pallavaram Cantonment Board |

Rural local bodies
| Classification | Count | Wards / entities |
|---|---|---|
| District panchayat | 1 | 16 district panchayat wards |
| Panchayat unions | 8 | Kattankolathur, St. Thomas Mount, Thiruporur, Tirukalukundram, Lathur, Chithamur, Madurantakam, Acharapakkam |
| Village panchayats | 359 | See list below. |

Major village panchayats: Mudichur, Vandalur, Urapakkam, Pozhichalur, Tirusulam, Cowl Bazaar, Medavakkam, Nanmangalam, Kovilambakkam, Agaramthen, Mappedu, Sithalapakkam, Kovilanchery, Ponmar, Mambakkam, Thalambur, Thimmavaram, Siruseri, Muttukadu, Singaperumal Koil, Paranur, Kodur, Koovathur, Nedumaram, Paiyanoor, Seekinankuppam, Veerabogam, Manamai, Padur, Kolatthur, Manampathy, Mullipakkam, Karumpakkam and Cheyyur.

== Demographics ==
Tamil language is the primary language spoken in the district.

== Politics ==
| District | No. | Constituency | Name | Party | Alliance | Remarks |
|---|---|---|---|---|---|---|
| Chengalpattu | 30 | Pallavaram | J. Kamatchi | TVK | TVK+ | |
| Chengalpattu | 31 | Tambaram | D. Sarathkumar | TVK | TVK+ | Cabinet Minister |
| Chengalpattu | 32 | Chengalpattu | S. Thiyagarajan | TVK | TVK+ | |
| Chengalpattu | 33 | Thiruporur | B. Vijayaraj | TVK | TVK+ | |
| Chengalpattu | 34 | Cheyyur (SC) | E. Rajasekar | AIADMK | AIADMK+ | Opposed TVK |
| Chengalpattu | 35 | Madurantakam (SC) | Maragatham Kumaravel | AIADMK | AIADMK+ | Supported TVK |

=== Assembly constituencies ===
Chengalpattu District has six state assembly constituencies:

- Chengalpattu
- Tambaram
- Pallavaram
- Maduranthakam
- Cheyyur
- Thiruporur

Two state assembly constituencies are partially from Chennai:

- Alandur - a few villages like Moovarasampattu and Cowl Bazaar only
- Sholinganallur - a few villages like Kovilambakkam, Nanmangalam and Medavakkam only

== District collectors of Chengalpattu ==
| No. | Name | Term of office | | |
| No. | Name | Assumed office | Left office | Time in office |
|---|---|---|---|---|
| 1 | A. John Louis | 29 November 2019 | 14 June 2021 | 1 year, 197 days |
| 2 | A. R. Rahul Nadh | 16 June 2021 | 27 January 2024 | 2 years, 225 days |
| 3 | S. Arunraj | 29 January 2024 | 22 June 2025 | 1 year, 144 days |
| 4 | D. Sneha | 23 June 2025 | 24 February 2026 | 246 days |
| 5 | S. Malathi Helen | 24 February 2026 | 29 May 2026 | 94 days |
| 6 | M. Veerappan | 29 May 2026 | Incumbent | 108 days |

Timeline

== Superintendents of police of Chengalpattu ==
| No. | Name | Term of office | | |
| No. | Name | Assumed office | Left office | Time in office |
|---|---|---|---|---|
| 1 | D. Kannan | 29 November 2019 | 8 March 2021 | 1 year, 99 days |
| 2 | E. Sundaravathanam | 8 March 2021 | 15 June 2021 | 99 days |
| 3 | P. Vijayakumar | 15 June 2021 | 2 December 2021 | 170 days |
| 4 | P. Aravindhan | 2 December 2021 | 22 March 2022 | 110 days |
| 5 | Suguna Singh | 22 March 2022 | 23 January 2023 | 307 days |
| 6 | V. V. Sai Praneeth | 23 January 2023 | 4 March 2026 | 3 years, 40 days |
| 7 | Ayman Jamal | 4 March 2026 | Incumbent | 194 days |

Timeline

== See also ==
- List of districts of Tamil Nadu
