= SRM University =

SRM University may refer to these related private universities in India:

- SRM Institute of Science and Technology (formerly SRM University), in Tamil Nadu
- SRM University, Andhra Pradesh
- SRM University, Haryana
- SRM University, Sikkim
