= Jaswal =

Indian surname

- Jat and Rajput clan
- Ethnicity: Punjabis
- Language: Punjabi
- Religion: Sikhism; Islam; Hinduism

Jaswal is an Indian surname found among Jat Sikhs and Muslims of Punjab. It is also a clan of Rajputs that commanded the former princely state of Jaswan.

== People with the surname ==
- Balli Kaur Jaswal, Singaporean novelist
- Nishtha Jaswal, Indian academic
- Paramjit Singh Jaswal, Indian professor
- Seema Jaswal (born 1985), British television and radio presenter
- Umair Jaswal (born 1986), Pakistani actor and musician
- Uzair Jaswal (born 1992), Pakistani actor and musician
- Yasir Jaswal (born 1983), Pakistani actor and musician
