= Indian community of London =

Indian diaspora in London

Total population
- 656,272; 7.5% of London's population (1/3rd of the total Indian population in the UK)

Regions with significant populations
- London; Southall, Wembley, Hounslow, Brent, Croydon, Redbridge, Ealing, Barnet, Tooting, Harrow

Languages
- English; Hindi; Punjabi; Gujarati; Bengali; Tamil; Telugu; and Various Other Languages of India

Religion
- Hinduism; Sikhism; Buddhism; Jainism; Zoroastrianism; Christianity; . Islam

Related ethnic groups
- Anglo-Indians

British Indians form the largest minority ethno-national group in London with a population of around 656,272 or 7.5% of the population. The majority are concentrated in West and North-west London (in the boroughs of Harrow, Hillingdon, Hounslow and Brent), though populations can be found throughout London.

Communities with significant Indian populations
Community	Percentage of total population
Greater London	7.5%
Harrow	28.6%
Hounslow	21.1%
Brent	19.5%
Hillingdon	18.7%
Redbridge	16.5%
Ealing	14.9%
Newham	11.0%

== Demographics ==
Proportion stating that their ethnic group was Indian in the 2011 census in Greater London.

As at 2021, the Indian population of Greater London was 656,272 or 7.5% of the population, (including those of British Indian ethnic origin).

== Religious groups ==
Hinduism: Some of the largest Hindu temples in Europe, the Shree Swaminarayan Mandir, is located in North West London, London. The number of Hindus in London is around 450,000, of which most are of Indian descent, and Hindus form just over 50% of Indians in Greater London.

Sikhism: Most Sikhs in Greater London live in West London, Southall being the heart of the community. And some also live in Bexleyheath, Erith, Hayes, Ruislip, Hounslow, Belvedere, Osterley and Ealing. The largest Sikh organisation in the UK is the London-based City Sikhs. The number of Sikhs in London is around 145,000, of which most are of Indian descent, and Sikhs compose over 20% of Indians in Greater London.

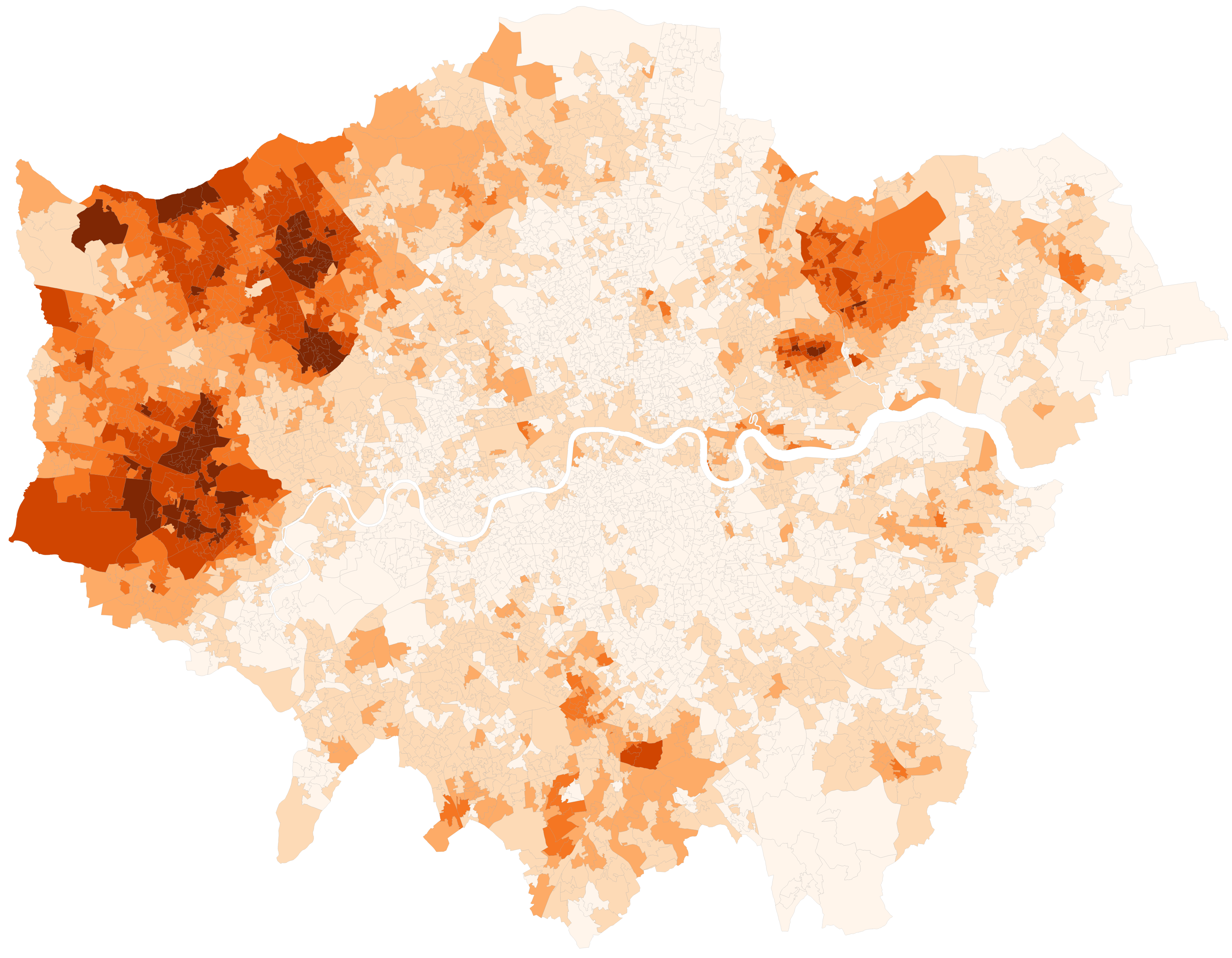
Distribution of people stating their ethnic group as Indian in the 2021 consensus (Greater London)

Christianity: There are a significant number of Christian Indians in London comprising over 11% of the ethnic group's population. Most of them are from the states of Kerala and Goa. Denominations include Indian Orthodox, Catholicism, and Protestantism. There is a church in Wembley which offers church services in the Gujarati language.

Islam: Around 10% of Indians in London are Muslims. They are located primarily in Newham, Redbridge and Waltham Forest in East London. Indian Muslims in London have strong connections to the Pakistani and Bangladeshi Muslim community of London. Most Indian Muslims came from East Africa, Jamaica, Gujarat, Bihar, West Bengal and Mumbai.

Zoroastrianism: The Parsi community, which mostly comes from the state of Gujarat or from Mumbai, is also present in London.

Jainism: In 2006 it was estimated that there were 25,000 Jains in the United Kingdom.

== Population spread ==
=== West London ===
In West London, close to Heathrow Airport, resides one of the UK's largest Indian communities. According to the 2001 Census, 39% of the people within the Ealing Southall constituency, comprising Southall and nearby areas, are of British Asian origin. Wembley and Harrow has a thriving Gujarati community while Southall being home to a thriving Punjabi community. Southall Broadway being popular among the diaspora for its Indian shops, cinemas and restaurants. Another Indian residential area is the London Borough of Hounslow.

== In popular culture ==
Singaporean author Balli Kaur Jaswal wrote the 2017 novel Erotic Stories for Punjabi Widows, which involves the Punjabi Sikh community in London.

== See also ==
- Indians in the New York City metropolitan area
- History of the Indian Americans in Metro Detroit
- South Asian Canadians in the Greater Toronto Area
- South Asian Canadians in Greater Vancouver
