= History of Indian Americans in Metro Detroit =

A 2013 report by the Global Detroit and Data Driven Detroit stated that of the immigrant ethnic groups to Metro Detroit, the largest segment is the Indian population. As of 2012, the Indian populations of Farmington Hills and Troy are among the twenty largest Indian communities in the United States. As of the 2000 U.S. census there were 39,527 people with origins from post-partition India (Indians and Indian Americans) in Metro Detroit, making them the largest Asian ethnic group in the Wayne County-Macomb County-Oakland County tri-county area. People of those origins are found throughout Metro Detroit, with the majority being in Oakland County. Across the border, there is an equally large and growing Indian Canadian community in Windsor, Ontario, Canada.

== History ==
In 1924 the "original six" people were the first Indians to settle in Detroit. They included Sarwan Singh Grewal, a Jat Sikh from Sahuli, Ludhiana District, Punjab, and Arjin Singh. They had moved to Detroit from California after experiencing a low wage of twenty cents an hour while working in that state. They drove in a car eastward, staying in Chicago for one month before settling in Detroit.

According to the 1990 U.S. census, the Wayne-Oakland-Macomb-Livingston area had 16,096 Asian Indians. By the 1990s Indian businesses and institutions began appearing in Metro Detroit, especially in Farmington Hills, Garden City, and Sterling Heights.

By 2004, there was an estimate of 93,681 Asian Indians in the entire State of Michigan, almost four times the number in 1990, 23,845. As of that year, many Asian Indians moved to Canton Township, Farmington Hills, Troy, and West Bloomfield Township.

As of 2006, of the over 100,000 ethnic Asian Indians in Michigan, the majority are in Metro Detroit.

== Geography ==
Canton Township, Farmington Hills, and Troy all have major Asian Indian populations. The 2008 CNN/Money "Best Places to Live" stated that the city of Novi had a significant Asian Indian population. According to the 2000 U.S. census there were 4,697 Asian Indians in Troy, 3,413 Asian Indians in Canton Township, 3,384 Asian Indians in Farmington Hills, and 1,278 ethnic Asian Indians in Novi. A 2014 Crain's Detroit Business article stated that Bloomfield Township also has a community of ethnic Asian Indians. As of 2006 there is also a population of Indians in West Bloomfield Township.

Within the City of Detroit, as of 2000, there were 2,991 Asian Indians. As of 2002, three areas had concentrations of Indian Americans. A portion of Detroit next to eastern Hamtramck includes Indian Americans along with Bangladeshi Americans and Pakistani Americans. Also the area north of Downtown Detroit; including the region around the Henry Ford Hospital, the Detroit Medical Center, and Wayne State University; has transient Asian national origin residents who are university students or hospital workers; most of these Asians are Chinese and Indians. Few of them have permanent residency after schooling ends. In addition there is an area in the westside of Detroit adjacent to Dearborn and Redford Township that has a mostly Indian Asian population.

== Demographics ==
Many Indian immigrants who arrive to Metro Detroit already have high competency in the English language. This is especially the case with people who work in the technology and health care sectors. As of 2014 over 70% of Metro Detroit ethnic Indians who were born outside of the United States have at minimum a bachelor's degree.

== Economy and commerce ==
Many Indians work in the information technology sector and medical sectors, and by 2014 an increasing demand in the sectors increased immigration of Indians to Metro Detroit. The automobile suppliers that manage information technology contracts with automobile companies hire Indian IT workers. As of 2014, almost half of ethnic Indians in Metro Detroit who were born outside of the United States have annual incomes of over $75,000.

Businesses supporting the Indian community include grocery stores, web portal www.miindia.com, AM radio stations, wedding companies, and dress shops.

== Religion ==
In the late 1970s, many Indian leaders in the community formed a committee to build the first Hindu Temple in Michigan. After years of planning and raising funds, in 1983, the Hare Krishna temple was inaugurated in Detroit. The creation of a religious building is an indicator of these Indian immigrants putting down roots in Michigan especially in the metro Detroit area. The population of South Asians in 1990 was fairly small with around 23,000 Asian-Indians, 1,500 Pakistani, 342 Bangladeshi, and 179 Sri Lankan people out of the total 100,000 Asian population. The presence of Asian Indians was prevalent enough for the census to include them as their own category. As of 2013 Hindu temples and religious centers had been recently established in Detroit, Ada, Canton, Hamtramck, Livonia, Novi, Pontiac, Sterling Heights, and Troy. In 2012 a Hindu temple built for $11 million opened in Troy. The Sri Venkateswara Temple and Cultural Center (SVTCC), a temple mainly catering to Telugu speakers, opened in Novi in 2013. It is the first Michigan Hindu temple to be named after a southern Indian deity.

There are many other Hindu Temples in Metro Detroit such as: BAPS Shri Swaminarayan Mandir Detroit and BAPS Shri Swaminarayan Mandir Sterling Heights

== Culture and recreation ==
The India Day, a celebration of Indian culture sponsored by the India League of America - Michigan, is held annually.

The Festival of India is held at Philip A. Hart Plaza in Downtown Detroit. Jaydevi and Bharat Sanghvi founded the festival. It was held regularly in the 1970s, but according to Sarah Klein of the Metro Times, it "lost its luster" and then was no longer held. Indians moved their cultural festivals to suburban areas as Detroit declined. In 2005, 20 years after the festival closed, the nonprofit United South Asian Promotions (USAP), founded by Gurvinder Singh, Jack Sandhu and Raj Sanghvi, the son of the original founders of the Festival of India, restarted the festival.

As of 2006 SR Movies, an eight screen movie theater in the Novi Town Center development in Novi, previously played standard American films in English and also Indian films, including those in Hindi, Telugu, and other Indian languages. Sonali and Rakesh Gangwani, a wife and husband couple from New Delhi resident in Redford Township, managed the theater, which according to Sonali was the first theater showing Bollywood films seven days per week in the state of Michigan. At least one Indian film, as of 2006, was screened every day. The couple took over the management of the theater in December 2005. Prior to the change in management, the Goodrich theater chain owned the complex, and the Gangwanis rented one or two screens on weekends. The management change was effective on the first of the month. The name "SR" came from their given names. The theater closed in 2010 as part of the redevelopment of Novi Town Center. The theater was not a part of the redevelopment plans, so it did not pay any rent during its final three years of operations.

Anand Kumar started the website Miindia, an Indian community portal, in 1999. In 2017 the website has a daily count of 6,000 unique users and over one million monthly hits. Among the small assortment of Indian publications in Michigan is the Little India of Michigan Newsletter, which is published online and is distributed in local Indian businesses.

== Notable residents ==
- Dr. Sanjay Gupta, chief medical correspondent for CNN (Novi)
- Representative Padma Kuppa, Indian-American Democrat serving in the state House of representatives from Troy, Michigan.
- Representative Sam Singh, Indian-American from East Lansing.
- Congressman Shri Thanedar, congressman of MI-13
- Madhu Anderson, former deputy treasurer of the State of Michigan

== See also ==
- Demographics of Metro Detroit
- Indo-Canadians in British Columbia
  - South Asian Canadians in Greater Vancouver
- South Asian Canadians in the Greater Toronto Area
- Indian community of London
