= Aliyar (village) =

Aaliyar (Aliyar)
- village
- Location in Tamil Nadu, India Aaliyar (Aliyar) (India)
- Coordinates: 10.484222°N 76.966000°E
- Country: India
- State: Tamil Nadu
- District: Coimbatore

Languages
  - Official: Tamil
- Time zone: UTC+5:30 (IST)
- PIN: 642 101
- Telephone code: 04253

Aliyar (also spelt Aaliyar / Azhiyar) is a village located near Pollachi Town in Coimbatore district in Tamil Nadu, India.

Aliyar Reservoir is located in this village. Temple of Consciousness, Vethathiri Maharishi Yoga and KayaKalpa Research Foundation is situated in Aliyar village. Indian Postal Code is 642 101.

== Location ==
Aliyar is located on Pollachi-Valparai Highway SH-78, next to Aliyar Reservoir and TNSTC State Transportation buses are available to Arutperunjothi Nagar (Aliyar) from Pollachi.

== See also ==
- N. Mahalingam
