= S. K. M. Maeilanandhan =

Indian industrialist

- Born: 18 June 1945 (age 81); Erode district, Tamil Nadu
- Occupation: Industrialist
- Awards: Padma Bhushan (2026); Padma Shri (2013)
- Website: Official web site

S. K. M. Maeilanandhan (born 18 June 1945) is an Indian industrialist from Erode district, Tamil Nadu. He is the founder of SKM group of companies. He is currently the president of the World Community Service Centre founded by Vethathiri Maharishi.

In 2013, he was awarded the Padma Shri, India's fourth highest civilian honour and in 2026, he was awarded the Padma Bhushan, India's third highest honour by the Government of India for his social service.

== Biography ==
Maeilanandhan was born on 18 June 1945 in a Kongu Vellalar agricultural family in Erode district. He opened a small general store at Erode in 1966 and later founded the SKM group of companies. Over the years, it grew into a ₹ 5 billion business conglomerate involved in diverse activities including poultry farming, manufacture of Ayurveda and Siddha medicines, fertilizers and animal feeds. The conglomerate runs several companies including SKM Egg Products, SKM Animal Feeds and Foods, SKM Siddha and Ayurveda, and SKM Universal Marketing. In 1983, he founded the Poultry Farmers Welfare Association in Tamil Nadu.

Maeilanandhan has served as the President of the World Community Service Centre, a non profit spiritual organization founded by Vethathiri Maharishi and involved in the education of yoga and meditation techniques, since 1996. The organization conducts welfare programmes covering various village panchayats across India. The charitable trust he founded in 1989 has adopted multiple villages to support them with basic infrastructure.

== Awards and honours ==
In 2013, Maeilanandhan was awarded the Padma Shri, India's fourth highest civilian honour by the Government of India for his contributions to social service. On 7 November 2025, he was awarded a honorory doctorate by SRM University, Haryana. In January 2026, he was awarded the Padma Bhushan, India's third highest civilian honour.
