= Nishtha Jaswal =

Indian Educationist

- Born: 1 February 1959 (age 67); Punjab
- Occupation: Professor of Law
- Spouse: Paramjit Singh Jaswal

Nishtha Jaswal is an academician and scholar in Law. She is Vice Chancellor of Dr. Bhimrao Ambedkar Law University, Jaipur and former Vice Chancellor of Himachal Pradesh National Law University, Shimla. She was the second Vice-Chancellor of HPNLU, Shimla and the third woman Vice Chancellor at any National Law University. She served as the Vice Chancellor of Himachal Pradesh National Law University, Shimla from November 2018 till January 2024.

== Education and career ==
Jaswal studied in Chandigarh, clearing Class 12 from Government Girls Model Senior Secondary School-18 and graduating from MCM DAV College for Women, before joining the department of laws at PU for post graduation and doctorate in law.

Jaswal did her Ph.D. in 1989 from Panjab University. She started her teaching career from 1986. She was also invited as visiting professor by the British Academy, London in 1992. She has served various roles through the course of her prolific career, including as a member of Chandigarh State Legal Services Authority, the Punjab Legal Services Authority, the Anti-Sexual Harassment Committee of the Chandigarh Judicial Academy, and the Academic Planning Board of the Rajiv Gandhi National University of Law, among others.

She has also been a member of the Board of studies for various Universities including Kurukshetra University, Maharishi Markandeshwar University, Himachal Pradesh University and the University Institute of Legal Studies, Panjab University.

Prior to taking charge as HPNLU’s VC, she was the Chairperson of the Law Department at Panjab University, Chandigarh. She was also the Chief Editor of the Panjab University Law Review. She has a teaching experience of 33 years and research experience of 35 years. She has to her credit 56 research papers and 6 books. Her book Environmental Law, was cited three times by the Supreme Court of India.

== Controversies ==
During her tenure of approximately 5 years, out of which the University operated online for two years from 2020 to 2022 on account of COVID-19, she bore witness to three protests by the students against the administration, in 2019, 2022 and 2023. She was also issued with a contempt of court notice by the Himachal Pradesh High Court in 2024.

In 2019, Himachal Pradesh National Law University (HPNLU) students in Shimla protested for eight days, citing poor infrastructure, including contaminated water and insect-infested food. Despite these concerns, the administration issued an evacuation notice, denying any request to leave. The university subsequently closed due to ongoing protests. The protest against the administration in 2019 lasted for 10 days, which ended only when the Chancellor and Himachal Pradesh chief justice Dharam Chand Chaudhary stepped in.

In 2022, the students wrote a letter to the Vice Chancellor, alleging inaction by the university’s administration in the sexual harassment complaint filed by female students against one of their professors. Apart from the sexual harassment complaint, the students complained about a myriad of issues like lack of basic amenities and monetary fraud with the students, hampering the quest for legal knowledge, etc.

In 2024, the Himachal Pradesh High Court directed the Registry to register a contempt case against Jaswal for wilful disobedience of Court orders.

== Books ==
- Role of the Supreme Court with regard to the right to life and personal liberty. Nishtha Jaswal. New Delhi: Ashish Pub. House. 1990. ISBN 81-7024-369-6. OCLC 25247740.
- Jaswal, Paramjit S. (1996). Human rights and the law. Nishtha Jaswal. New Delhi: APH Pub. Corp. ISBN 81-7024-729-2. OCLC 34319089.
- Laws as a facilitator of socio-economic reforms. Shashi K. Sharma, Paramjit S. Jaswal, Nishtha Jaswal (First ed.). Allahabad. 2013. ISBN 978-93-82676-38-6. OCLC 898850991.
- Kaur, Ranbir; Lali, Upneet. Jaswal, Nishtha (ed.). Clemency jurisprudence : clemency in criminal justice system. New Delhi. ISBN 978-81-929868-2-1. OCLC 1258042964.
- Jaswal, Paramjit Singh; Jaswal, Nishtha; Jaswal, Vibhuti. Environmental Law (5th ed.). Allahabad: Allahabad Law Agency, Faridabad, Haryana, 1999 (published 2021). ISBN 81-89530-30-5.

== Personal life ==
Her husband, Paramjit Singh Jaswal, is the currently the Vice Chancellor of SRM University, Haryana after having tendered his resignation on 30.11.2023 as the Vice Chancellor of Rajiv Gandhi National University of Law, after being at loggerheads with the state govt., as the students requested a forensic audit.
