= Maraimalai Nagar =

Maraimalai Nagar, Chennai
- Town
- Location within Tamil Nadu
- Coordinates: 12.785185°N 80.025601°E
- Country: India
- State: Tamil Nadu
- District: Chengalpattu
- Taluk: Chengalpattu
- Metro: Chennai Metropolitan Area

Government
  - Body: Municipality

Area
  - Total: 58.08 km^{2} (22.42 sq mi)

Population (2011)
  - Total: 81,872
  - Density: 1,410/km^{2} (3,651/sq mi)

Languages
  - Official: Tamil
- Time zone: UTC+5:30 (IST)
- PIN: 603209
- Telephone code: 91(044)
- Vehicle registration: TN-19
- Website: municipality.tn.gov.in/Maraimalainagar/

Maraimalai Nagar is a municipality town in South Chennai at Chengalpattu district, Tamil Nadu, India. Lying in the southern part of the Chennai metropolitan area, it is a satellite town of Chennai, the state capital, around 50 km from Downtown Chennai (Egmore) and about 15 km from Vandalur. It was developed by the CMDA in 1980. Many heavy industries are located in Maraimalai Nagar. The Ford India and BMW car factories are located within a mile from Maraimalai Nagar and the Indian software giant Infosys also has an office within eight kilometers of Maraimalai Nagar. SRM University has its main campus in the neighboring Potheri. As of 2011, Maraimalai Nagar had a population of 81,872.

The neighbourhood is served by the Maraimalai Nagar railway station of the Chennai Suburban Railway Network.

Maraimalai Nagar is a well developed municipality, and has a great network of roads and drainage. The way the town gets water is through pipelines which connects the river Palar.

== Local administration ==
Maraimalai Nagar Municipality comprises Kattankulathur, Potheri, Thailavaram, Vallanchery, Thirukatchur, Kalivandhapattu, Kadambur, Koodalur and Peramanur villages and was constituted as Third grade Municipality in 2004. In 2010, it is upgraded as Special Grade Municipality. The town is divided into 21 wards. The extent of Municipal Area is 58.08 km^{2}. Maraimalai Nagar is also very near to Oragadam - a new investment destination near Chennai.

Maraimalai Nagar is one of the industrial hub in South Chennai, Chengalpattu District. Maraimalai Nagar Satellite Town was developed by CMDA and it is located in the south direction at a distance of 45 km from Chennai City Centre. It is located 15 km north from Chengalpattu, the district headquarters. It is situated at 12'41'30" latitude and 74'58'00" longitude and 28 m elevated from the mean sea level.

Maraimalai Nagar has the location advantage in terms of transportation net work. The town is well connected by rail and road, Chennai–Dindigul National Highway No.45 passes through the Town. Chennai-Trichy Broad-gauge railway lines passes through the town.

== Transport ==
Maraimalai Nagar has a railway station, bus stand, upgraded primary health care, telephone exchange, electricity office, post office, police station and higher secondary schools. The suburb is close to SRM University and its group of institutions (Valliammai Engineering College, SRM School of Management, SRM Medical College, SRM Hospital, Valliammai Polytechnic, SRM Polytechnic, SRM Institute of Hotel Management, SRM Arts and Science, SRM Pharmacy) which are located in Potheri, 2 kilometres (1.2 mi) from Guduvancheri. It is becoming the largest residential area between Chennai Tambaram and Chengalpet/Kanchipuram because of the IT and automobile companies in and around Maraimalai Nagar like Accenture, Ford, Mahindra World City and SEZ.

== Demographics ==
Religious census
Religion	Percent(%)
Hindu	90.27%
Muslim	3.58%
Christian	5.6%
Sikh	0.1%
Buddhist	0.04%
Jain	0.07%
Other	0.32%
No religion	0.02%

According to 2011 census, Maraimalai Nagar had a population of 81,872 with a sex-ratio of 953 females for every 1,000 males, much above the national average of 929. A total of 8,821 were under the age of six, constituting 4,555 males and 4,266 females. Scheduled Castes and Scheduled Tribes accounted for 18.54% and .45% of the population respectively. The average literacy of the city was 78.67%, compared to the national average of 72.99%. The city had a total of 19,970 households. There were a total of 31,926 workers, comprising 329 cultivators, 732 main agricultural labourers, 853 in house hold industries, 25,637 other workers, 4,375 marginal workers, 71 marginal cultivators, 191 marginal agricultural labourers, 164 marginal workers in household industries and 3,949 other marginal workers. As per the religious census of 2011, Maraimalainagar (M) had 90.27% Hindus, 3.58% Muslims, 5.6% Christians, 0.1% Sikhs, 0.04% Buddhists, 0.07% Jains, 0.32% following other religions and 0.02% following no religion or did not indicate any religious preference.

== Geography ==
777.83 hectares of land are cultivated in Maraimalai Nagar area. Main crops cultivated in this area are paddy, sugarcane, groundnut, raggi, etc. Water sources for irrigation: Palar River water source and local sources.

Maraimalar Nagar is a part of the Chennai Metropolitan Area and it is well connected with other parts of the Chennai city by road and the Chennai Suburban Railway Network. It also has good connectivity with Chengalpattu through road and rail.

== See also ==
- List of neighbourhoods of Chennai
- Potheri
- SRM Institute of Science and Technology
- Kattankulathur
- Thailavaram
- Urapakkam
