= Kattankulathur =

- Town
- Location in Tamil Nadu, India Kattankulathur (India)
- Coordinates: 12.808°N 80.029°E
- Country: India
- State: Tamil Nadu
- District: Chengalpattu
- Taluk: Chengalpattu
- Metro: Chennai Metropolitan Area

Languages
  - Official: Tamil
- Time zone: UTC+5:30 (IST)
- PIN: Chengalpattu-603203
- Telephone code: 044
- Vehicle registration: TN-19
- Nearest big city: Tambaram
- Lok Sabha constituency: Chengalpattu
- Vidhan Sabha constituency: Thiruporur

Kattankulathur is a suburb of Chennai, India, located on the southern side of the city in Chengalpattu district of Tamil Nadu. It comes under the Maraimalai Nagar municipality in the Chengalpattu taluk and within Chennai Metropolitan Area.

== Transportation ==
Kattankulathur is located in the southern part of Chennai city. it is located along the busy GST Road on Chennai-Trichy National Highway. The neighborhood is served by the Kattankulathur railway station, which is about 20 minutes from Chennai Tambaram. The Chennai Suburban Railway operates a suburban railway service from Chennai Beach. It is well connected to other parts of the city by road. All MTC buses towards Maraimalai Nagar pass via Kattankulathur.

== Education ==
SRM Institute of Science and Technology and Valliammai Engineering College are located in Kattankulathur.

== See also ==
- List of neighbourhoods of Chennai
- Guduvancheri
- Potheri
- SRM Institute of Science and Technology
- Urapakkam
- Thailavaram
