= Thailavaram =

- village
- Location in Tamil Nadu, India Thailavaram (India)
- Coordinates: 12.831146178103168°N 80.04478545870371°E
- Country: India
- State: Tamil Nadu
- District: Chengalpattu

Languages
  - Official: Tamil
- Time zone: UTC+5:30 (IST)
- PIN: 603202
- Telephone code: 044

Thailavaram is a village located between Guduvancheri and Potheri of Maraimalai Nagar municipality in Chengalpattu District in Tamil Nadu, India. It is situated just 2 kilometres (1.2 mi) from Guduvancheri along the GST Road and it is situated 37 kilometres (23 mi) from Chennai, between Tambaram and Chengalpattu highway. The PIN Code of Thailavaram is 603 203.

L&T's Estanzia IT SEZ (Special Economic Zone) is located just opposite to this village.

Kalyana Anjaneya Temple is an important temple here as God Kalyana Anjaneya is with his Consort Suvarchala Devi.

Thailavaram is experiencing major infrastructural developments due to their close proximity to the New Chennai Kilambakkam Mofussil Bus Terminus (KMBT) located 6 kms away.

== Etymology of Thailavaram ==
Etymology: The village received its name Thailavaram ("Thaila" means Eucalyptus (Thailamaram) and "varam" means gift literally in Tamil). Eucalyptus trees are found abundant in this village which are nature's gift.

== Geography ==
Thailavaram is a developing village located along National Highway 32 near Guduvancheri that connects Chennai with the cities in southern and western Tamil Nadu. Nearest town's are Guduvancheri and Potheri.

Guduvancheri is located just two kilometers from the village Thailavaram. Important locations nearby are L&T's Estanzia IT SEZ (Special Economic Zone), Valliammai Engineering College, SRM Institute of Science and Technology which are at a throw-away distance from this village.

The village once known for its agricultural lands but which is losing its scenic beauty due to very rapid development of the suburb's near chennai city and SEZ (Special Economic Zone's)

== Transportation ==
Thailavaram is well connected by roads, as it is located near Chennai, between Tambaram and Chengalpattu State Road highway. Nearest Railway stations are Guduvancheri and Potheri. Frequent Tamil Nadu State run TNSTC buses are available.

Distance in kms
Destination	Distance
Potheri	2 km
Guduvancheri	2.2 km
Kattankulathur	4 km
Urapakkam	5.4 km
Kilambakkam Bus Terminus	6.1 km
Tambaram	14.3 km
Chengalpattu	20 km

== See also ==
- Guduvancheri
- Potheri
- SRM Institute of Science and Technology
- Kattankulathur
- Urapakkam
