= Potheri Village, Chengalpattu =

Village locality of Chennai, India

Coordinates: 12.825527°N 80.039606°E

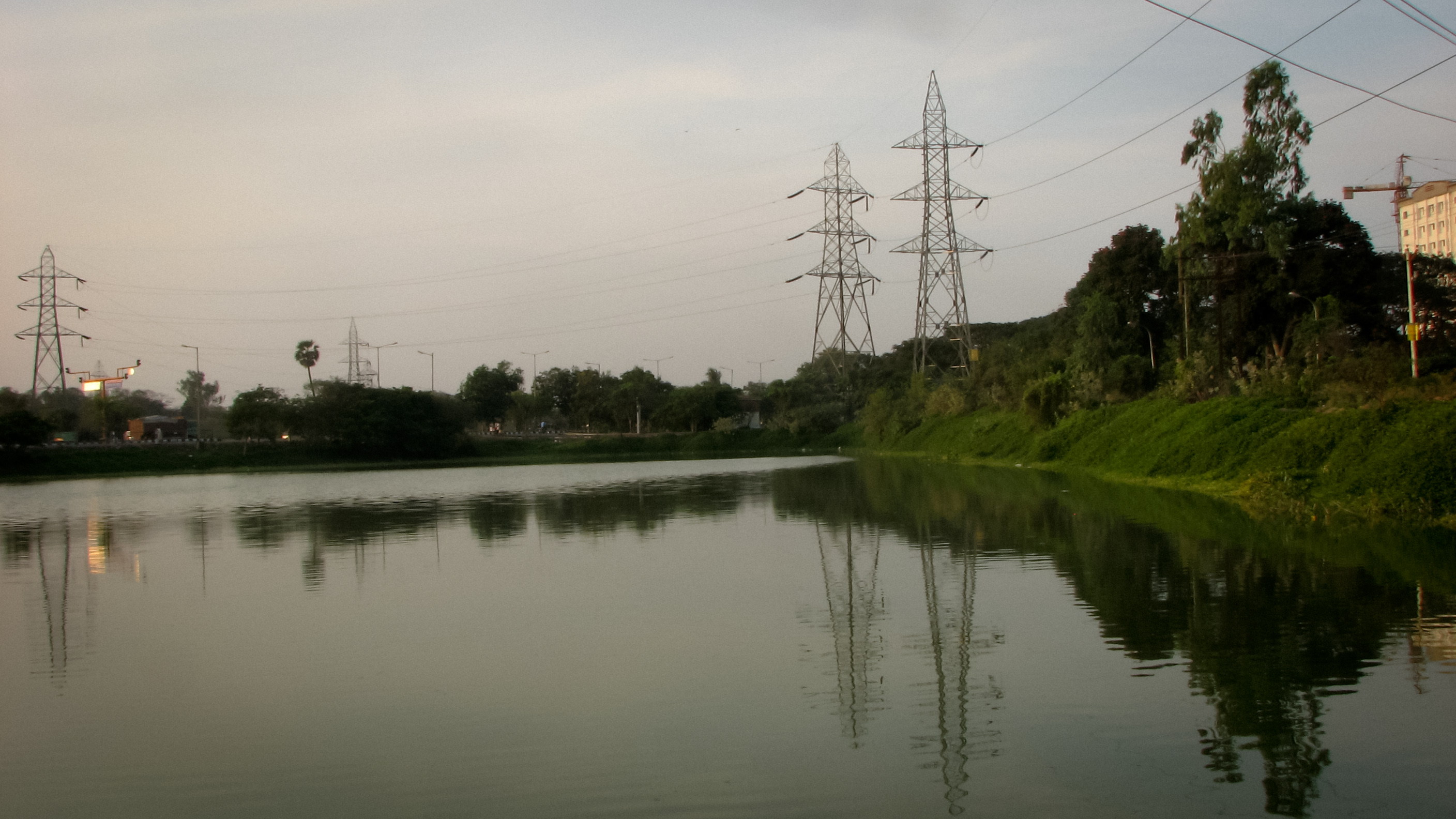
SRM Lake

Potheri is a rapidly-growing village locality in the South suburbs of the Metroepolitan city Chennai. It is a town that comes under Maraimalai Nagar municipality of Chengalpattu taluk in the Chengalpattu district of Tamil Nadu, India and suburb of Chennai within Chennai Metropolitan Area. It is about 2.5 kilometers from Guduvancheri.The primary educational institutions located in Potheri are SRM Institute of Science and Technology and Valliammai Engineering College.

The neighbourhood is served by the Potheri railway station Chengalpattu taluk to Chennai Suburban Railway Network.

The population of Potheri is primarily composed of students from the educational institutions located in Potheri. The socioeconomic status of the village almost entirely depends upon the SRM Institute of Science and Technology. Most of the population of Potheri live in apartment buildings. Potheri is located in South Chennai and it is developing rapidly in the modern developments. These are experiencing major infrastructural developments due to their proximity to the New Chennai Kilambakkam Mofussil Bus Terminus (KMBT).

== Transportation ==
Potheri is located in the southern part of the Chennai city and is well-connected by roads and railways. The city is located along the National Highway-45 (NH-45) GST Road, Chennai Tambaram and Chengalpattu Kanchipuram district highway.

== See also ==
- Guduvancheri at Chengalpattu region
- Thailavaram at Chengalpattu region
- Kattankulathur at Chengalpattu region
