= Navamalai =

- village
- Location in Tamil Nadu, India Navamalai (India)
- Coordinates: 10.46°N 77.00°E
- Country: India
- State: Tamil Nadu
- District: Coimbatore
- Elevation: 39 m (128 ft)

Population (2001)
  - Total: 300

Languages
  - Official: Tamil
- Time zone: UTC+5:30 (IST)
- PIN: 642114
- Telephone code: 04259 is the telephone code
- Vehicle registration: TN 41
- Sex ratio: Females are more than Males. ♂/♀

Navamalai is a small village in the panchayat town of Kottur-Malayandipattinam in Coimbatore District in the Indian state of Tamil Nadu. It is inside Anamalai Tiger Reserve. The village is also home to the Aliyar Power House, a large hyrdoelectric power station operated by the Tamil Nadu Green Energy Corporation Limited.

== Geography ==
Navamalai is located 13 kilometres (8 mi) south of Kottur-Malayandipattinam in the Pollachi taluk (and parliamentary constituency) in Coimbatore District. Navamalai means "Nine Mountains" in Tamil; as the name suggests, it is surrounded by nine of the mountains that form the Western Ghats.

The River Aliyar falls from the high mountains and starts its journey through the plains from this small village. The southern end of Aliyar Dam touches the village. There are many other streams in the mountains all of which pass through the village before joining the river Aliyar. The mountains are green and the forests have rare trees and plants. Granite patches are visible at many places in the mountains. Thick forests give cover to many wild animals.

== History ==
The village has no written history aside from approximately 150 years of land records.

== Demographics ==
The population of Navamalai falls into three main categories:

1. Tamil Nadu Electricity Board workers
The settlement of the electricity board, referred as the "EB Camp", is on the east side of the village. It has well-built houses with good infrastructure.
2. Tribal people
Tribal people mainly live on the roadsides, along the banks of river aliyar and on a hillock in the middle of an agricultural land belonging to a Telugu chettiar, on the western side.
3. Agricultural labourers and petty shop owners
Agricultural labours live on the fields, while and small shop keepers live near the EB camp.

== Land ownership ==
The land belongs to Tamil Nadu Electricity Board, Department of Forests, and the Government of Tamil Nadu. All the agricultural land, which totals more than 100 acres, is owned by one person who belonged to the Telugu Chettiar caste. (This wealthy migrant community from Andhra Pradesh forms the largest minority in Tamil Nadu.) Tribal people who were permanent residents of the place were made to become agricultural labourers and security personnel. Today they live in huts and mud houses, but do not work on the fields, instead going to different places to work as daily-wage labourers.
