= SRM University, Sikkim =

State private university in India

Coordinates: 12°49′25″N 80°2′39″E

- Other names: Shri Ramasamy Memorial University, Sikkim
- Motto: Learn, Leap, Lead
- Type: Private
- Established: 2013
- Chancellor: Dr. P. Sathyanarayanan
- Vice-Chancellor: Cdr. (Dr.) Gurdaman L. Sharma
- Location: Tadong, Sikkim, India
- Website: www.srmus.ac.in

SRM University, Sikkim (formally Shri Ramasamy Memorial University, Sikkim) is a state private university enacted by The Shri Ramasamy Memorial University, Sikkim Act, 2013 (Act No.13 of 2013) in October 2013. This venture was started by the SRM Group, who have more than 3 decades of experience in the education management industry.

== Academics ==
The SRM University, Sikkim provides the undergraduate and postgraduate programs under 3 main constituent faculties namely, School of Information Technology, School of Management & Commerce and School of Hospitality and Tourism Studies. Semester pattern of examinations and credit system are followed for all the programs.

== Admission and scholarships ==
Admissions are based on the rules and regulations of the University Grants Commission (UGC)/Competent Authorities. Financial Aid and Scholarships are provided to students belonging to reserved communities as per the regulations laid by the Government of Sikkim. Scholarships are provided to deserving candidates. The financial aid is provided under the following categories.

- Meritorious Students
- Socially/economically disadvantaged candidates
- Physically Challenged
- Sikkim Natives/Locals (based on Government Norms).

== Infrastructure ==
=== Hostel Accommodation ===
The university provides hostel accommodation for boys and girls separately.

== See also ==
- SRM Institute of Science and Technology
- SRM University, Haryana
- SRM University, Andhra Pradesh
