= Aliyar Reservoir =

Reservoir in Tamil Nadu, India

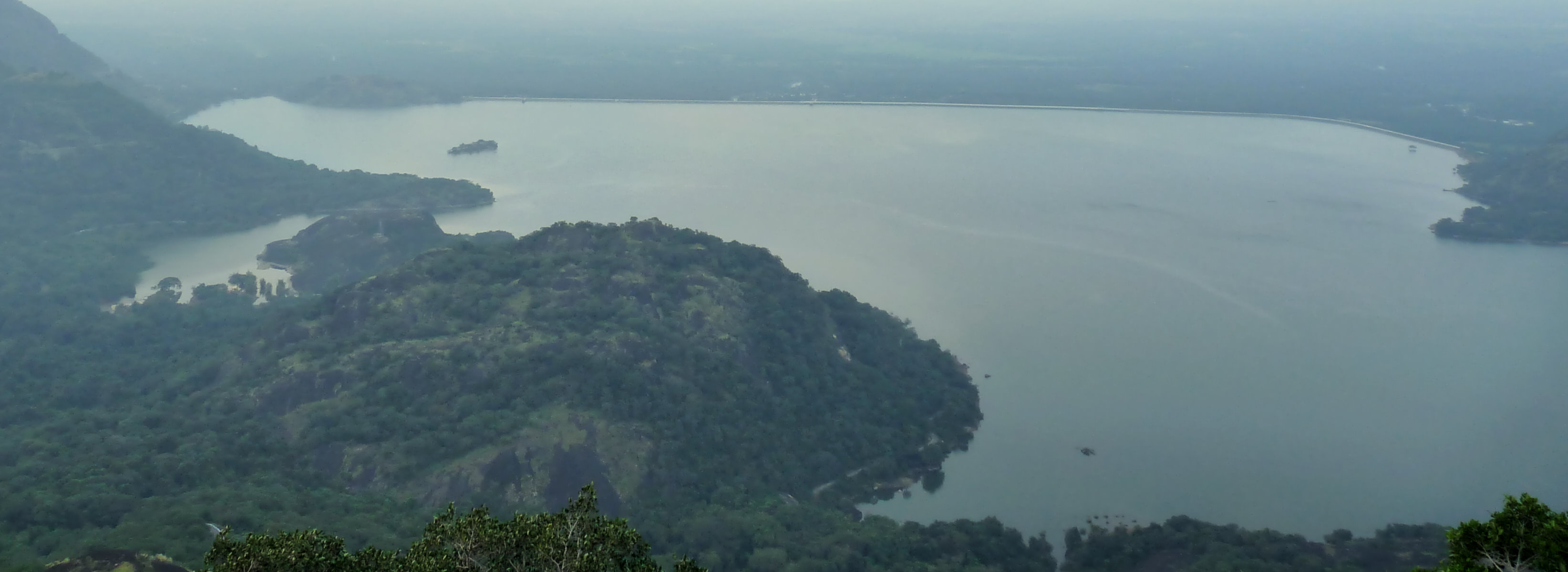
- Aerial view of Aliyar Reservoir, Dam at top

- Location of the Aliyar Reservoir in Tamil Nadu
- Country: India
- Location: Coimbatore District, Tamil Nadu
- Coordinates: 10.4739°N 76.9728°E
- Opening date: 1962

Dam and spillways
- Type of dam: Gravity dam
- Height: 235 ft (72 m)

Reservoir
- Creates: Aliyar Reservoir
- Total capacity: 109.42 million cubic meters (MCM) or 3.86 tmc ft
- Catchment area: 468.8 km^{2} (181.0 sq mi)
- Surface area: 6.48 km^{2} (2.50 sq mi)
- Maximum water depth: 36.5 m (120 ft)
- Normal elevation: 320 m (1,050 ft)

Power Station
- Operator: Tamil Nadu Green Energy Corporation Limited
- Commission date: Unit 1: 21 March 1970; Lower Aliyar Dam Unit 2: 23 September 2002
- Turbines: 1 x 60 MW; 2 x 1.25 MW
- Installed capacity: 62.50 MW

Aliyar (also spelt Azhiyar / Aaliyar) Reservoir is a 6.48 km^{2} (2.5 sq mi) reservoir located in Aliyar village near Pollachi town in Coimbatore District, Tamil Nadu, South India. The dam is located in the foothills of Valparai, in the Anaimalai Hills of the Western Ghats. It is about 65 kilometres (40 mi) from Coimbatore. The dam offers some ideal getaways including a park, garden, aquarium, play area and a mini Theme-Park maintained by Tamil Nadu Fisheries Corporation for visitors enjoyment. The scenery is beautiful, with mountains surrounding three quarters of the reservoir. Boating is also available.

== History ==
The Aliyar Dam was constructed during 1959-1969 across the Aliyar river, mainly for irrigation purposes. Aliyar Dam was inaugurated on 2 October 1962 (Gandhi Jayanti day) by then Prime minister of India, Pandit Jawaharlal Nehru, K Kamaraj, the Chief Minister of Tamil Nadu state presided over the function. The project was commissioned in September 2002 to generate Hydro Electric Power.

== Hydrography ==
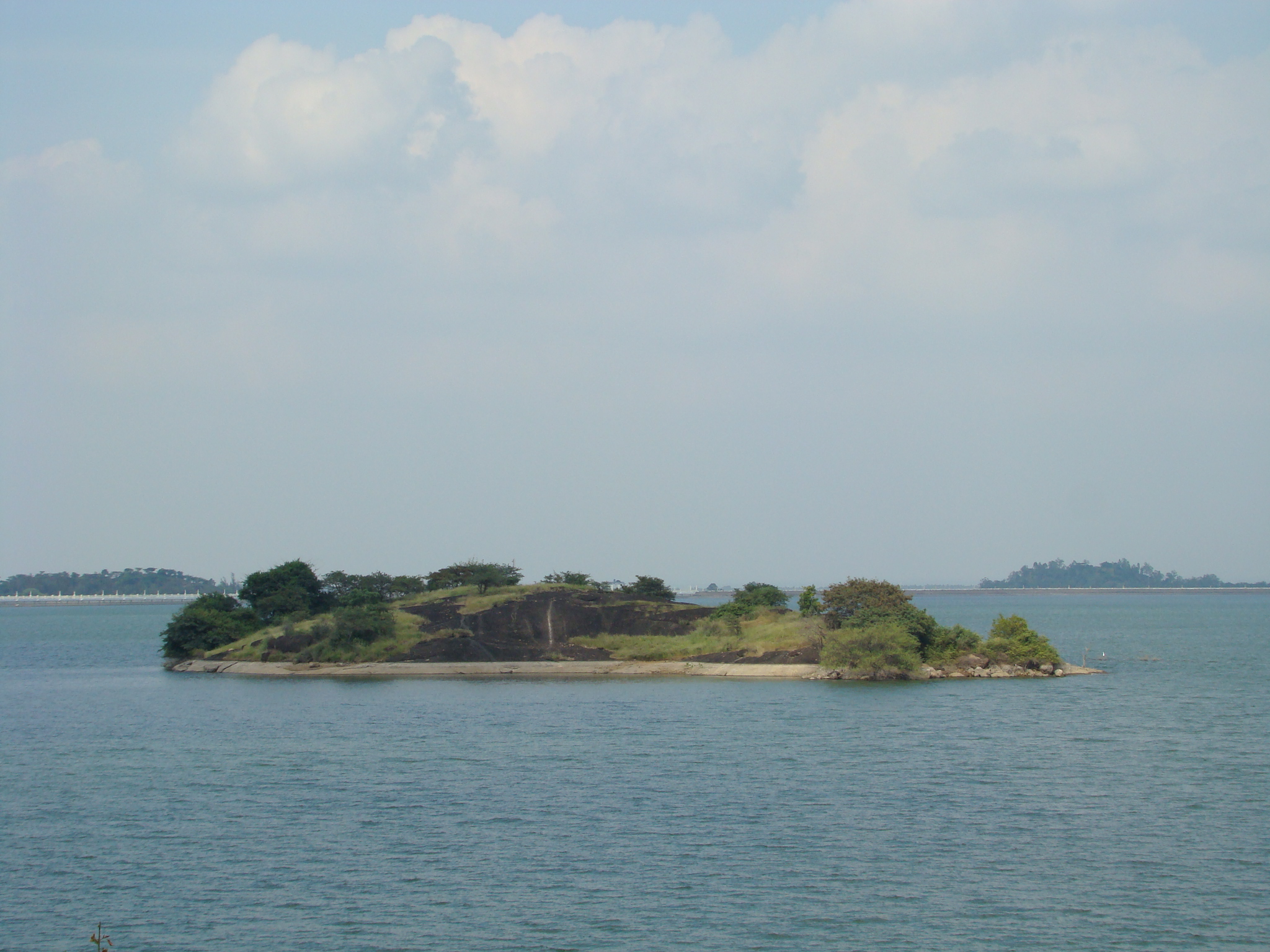
Island in Aliyar Reservoir, Dam in background

Aliyar lake receives water from Upper Aliyar Reservoir through the hydroelectric power station in Navamali and the Parambikulam reservoir through a contour canal. Aliyar dam, built as a part of Parambikulam aliyar project (PAP), retains a large reservoir. The dam is around 2 kilometres (1.2 mi) in length.

The lowest level outlet of the reservoir is 930 feet (280 m) above Mean Sea Level (MSL) and the canal intake is 980 feet (300 m) above MSL. The spillway is 1,040 feet (320 m) above MSL and the FRL (Full Reservoir Level) is 1,050 feet (320 m) above MSL. The maximum surface area is 48 hectares (120 acres) (1,600 acres). The volume of water at FRL is 3.864 Tmcft (88,705 acre-feet (109,416,000 m^{3})). The maximum depth is 41 metres (135 ft) and the mean depth 16.8 metres (55 ft) . The volume development is 1.2 m. The highest inflow usually occurs during July and August. The shoreline is poorly indented, the shore development is poor and shallow and the Aquatic plants and limnology of the littoral zone is also very limited.

== Fisheries ==
Ailyar reservoir was studied by the Central Inland Fisheries Research Institute (CFRI) for eleven years from 1982 to 1992. The rate of energy conversion at primary producer level and at the fish production level at Aliyar is considered higher than in any other Indian reservoir. The indigenous fish of the reservoir includes 40 species belonging to 13 families, plus seven stocked species

== Hydel Power Project ==
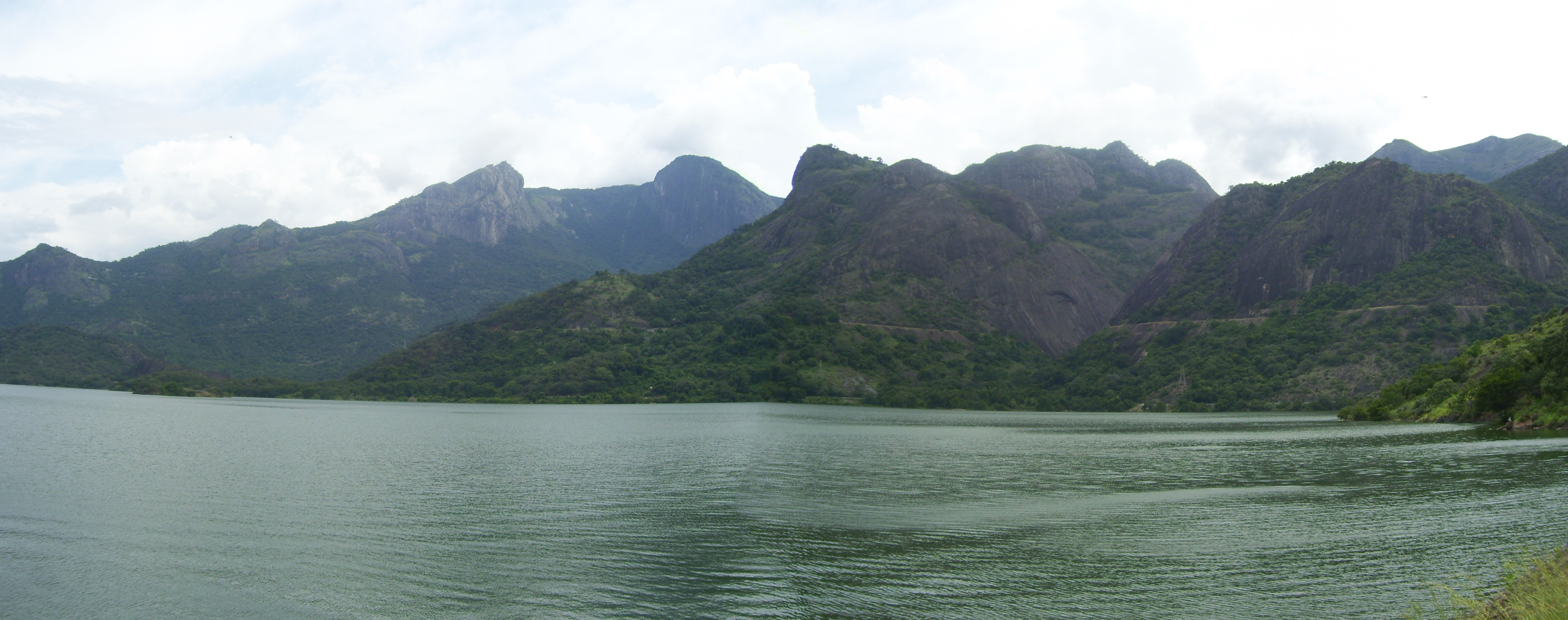
A panoramic view of the Aliyar Reservoir

This project consists of a series of dams interconnected by tunnels and canals for harnessing the waters of the Parambikulam, Aliyar, Sholiyar, Thunakadavu, Thekkadi and Palar rivers, flowing at various elevations, for irrigation and power generation. The scheme is an outstanding example of engineering skill. At present, the discharges are being let down through three sets of sluices/ canals, viz., Pollachi Canal, Vettaikaranpudur Canal and the river sluices. Under this scheme, the irrigation discharges let down through river sluices of the Aliyar Dam utilized for power generation in a power house at the toe of the dam. Being a micro hydel scheme, this project is subsidized by the Ministry of Non-conventional Energy Sources, Government of India.

== Visitor information ==
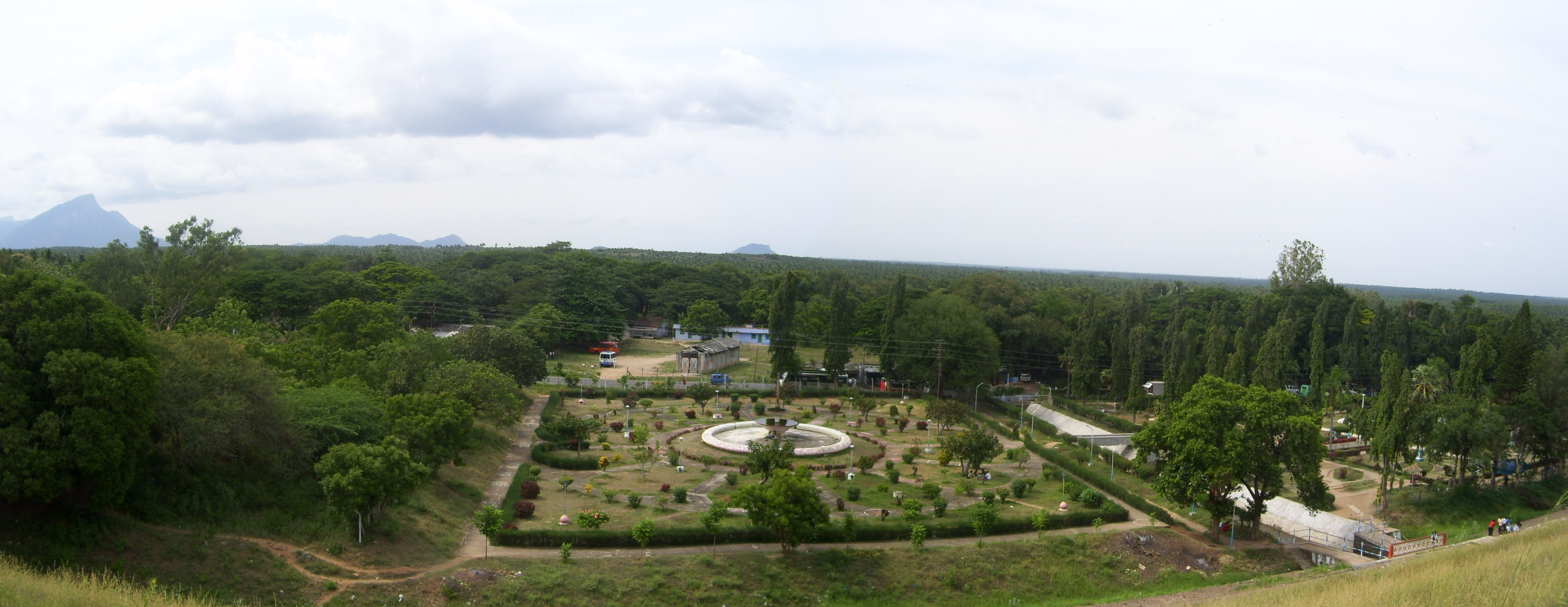
View of park garden from top of the dam

Aliyar dam is a popular tourist destination. Near Aliyar dam are some visitor attractions including a park, garden, aquarium, play area and a mini Theme-Park maintained by Tamil Nadu Fisheries Corporation for visitors enjoyment. Temple of Consciousness is situated near Aliyar dam entrance at Arutperunjothi Nagar, where Vethathiri Maharishi resides. The scenery is beautiful, with mountains surrounding three quarters of the reservoir. Boating is also available. Monkey Falls is located at 6 km from the dam next to Arutperunjothi Nagar and Forest Department Checkpost. Overnight stay is possible in the forest rest house. A treetop house provides accommodation for the adventurous. The Dam and Park and the overall surroundings of the dam are very poorly maintained as of 2017.

== See also ==
- List of dams and reservoirs in India
- Valparai
