= South Asian Canadians in the Greater Toronto Area =

Ethnic group

South Asian Canadians in Metro Toronto
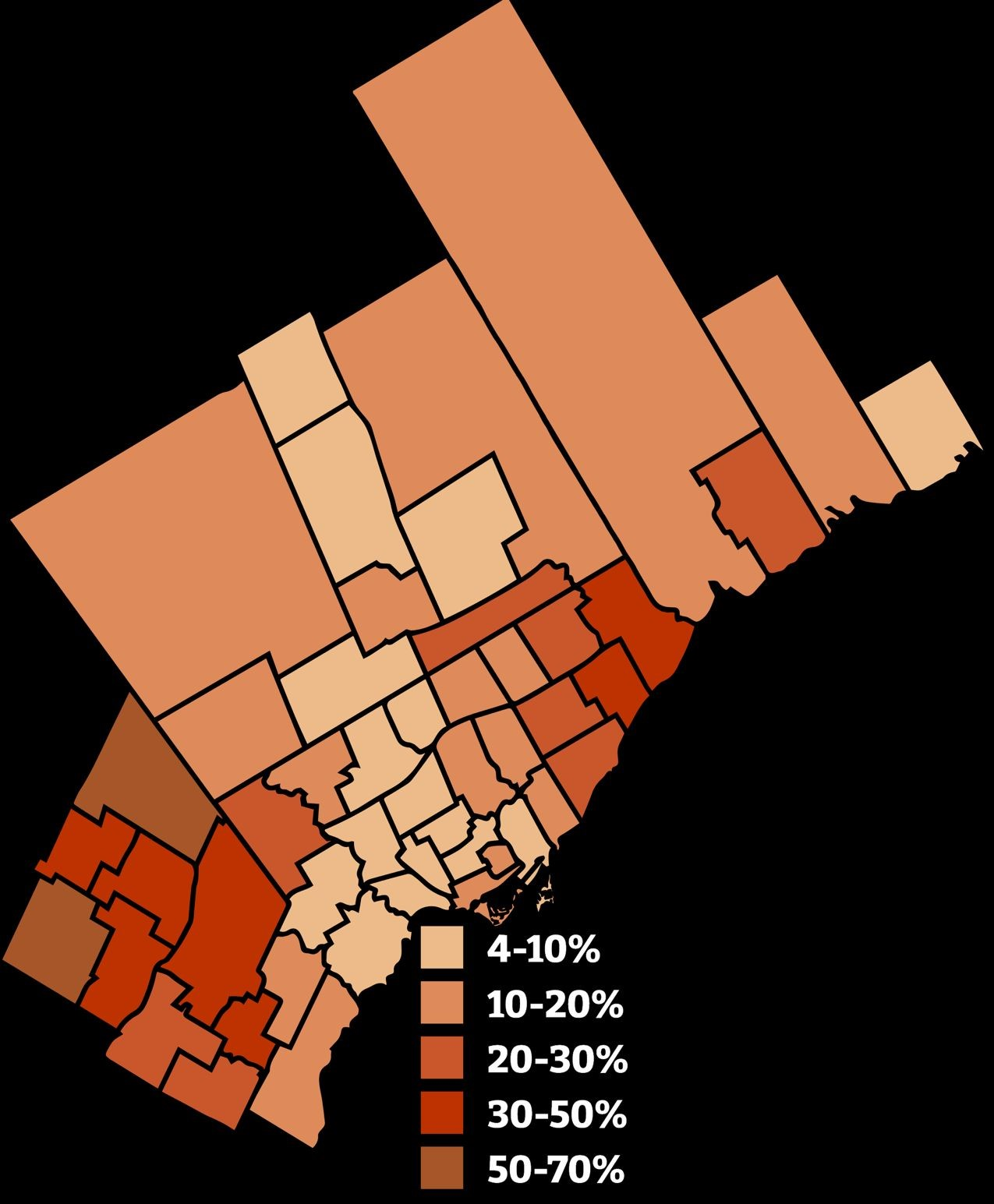
- Population distribution of South Asian Canadians in Toronto by federal electoral district, 2021 census

Total population
- 1,182,485; 19% of the population of Greater Toronto Area (2021)

Regions with significant populations
- Mississauga, Brampton, Toronto, Greater Toronto Area, Markham, Milton, Oakville, Ajax, Scarborough, Etobicoke,

Languages
- English, Punjabi, Urdu, Hindi, Bengali various other South Asian languages

Religion
- Islam, Hindu, Christianity, Sikhism

Related ethnic groups
- Indo Canadians, Pakistani Canadians; Afghan Canadians, Indian Americans

South Asian Canadians in the Greater Toronto Area form 19% of the region's population, numbering 1.2 million as of 2021. Comprising the largest visible minority group in the region, Toronto is the destination of over half of the immigrants coming from South Asia to Canada. South Asian Canadians in the region also includes significant Indian, Pakistanis, Bangladeshis, Sri Lankans, and Nepalis, all representing several different ethnolinguistic backgrounds.

== History ==
Indo-Canadians began to move to Toronto in the 1960s.

Air India Flight 182 was bombed in 1985. The majority of the passengers resided in the Toronto area. In 2007 a memorial for Air India 182 opened in Toronto.

From 1986 to 1995, over 140,000 persons of South Asian origin moved to the Toronto area. An additional 266,000 arrived from 1996 to 2006.

By 2007 South Asians had established philanthropic efforts.

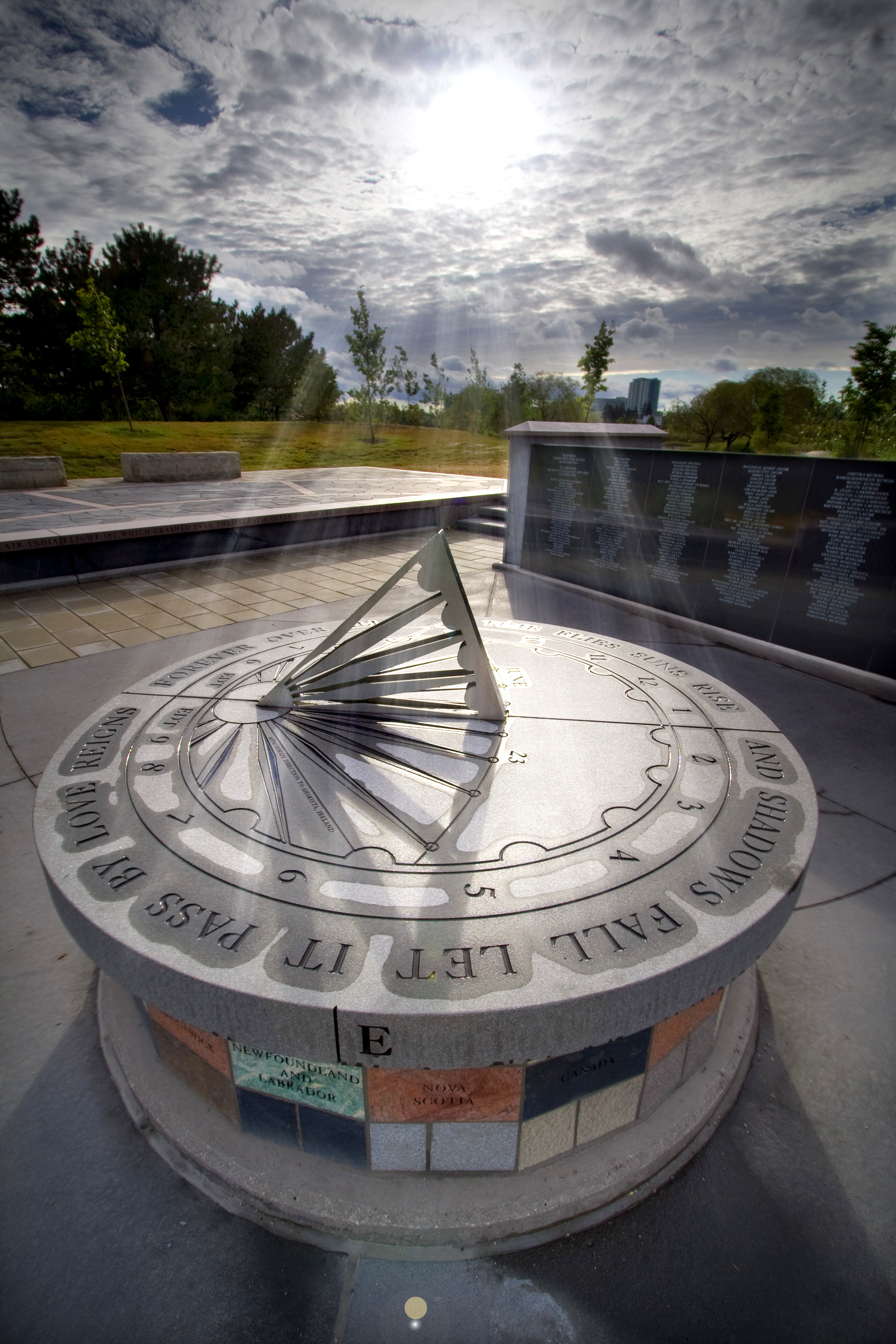
Air India Flight 182 memorial in Toronto

== Geography ==
As of 2011 the main areas of Indo-Canadian settlement are Scarborough and Etobicoke in Toronto and the cities of Brampton, Markham, and Mississauga.

The first persons of South Asian origin settling in Toronto did so in Downtown and other inner-city areas, establishing a Little India (also known as Gerrard India Bazaar) on the eastside in the early 1970s. As the community matured, South Asians began moving to suburban and exurban areas.

== Demographics ==
As of the Statistics Canada 2001 Census there were 504,005 South Asians in the Toronto region. Of them, 345,855 were classified as East Indian, 45,240 were Sri Lankan, 33,145 were Tamil, 32,305 were South Asian n.i.e., 20,480 were Punjabi, 6,435 were Bangladeshi, 3,795 were Bengali, 2,725 were Goan, 1,970 were Sinhalese, 1,830 were Gujarati, 385 were Nepali, and 270 were Kashmiri.

As of circa 1990 there were higher proportions of Gujaratis and Punjabis, while numbers of Maharashtrians were fewer.

=== Income ===
Indo-Canadians in the Greater Toronto Area have an average household income of $86,425, which is higher than the Canadian average of $81,709 but lower than the Toronto Census Metropolitan Area's average of $95,326.

Indha Rajagopal, the author of "The Glass Ceiling in the Vertical Mosaic: Indian Immigrants to Canada," analyzed the 1986 Census of Canada. She concluded that in Toronto Indo-Canadians had salaries lower than other people in Toronto, including native-born persons and people who immigrated. Rajagopal stated that credentials obtained from institutions abroad were possibly not being recognized in Canada, so even though Ontario Indo-Canadians had higher likelihoods of completing university studies than the general population, the Indo-Canadians were unable to get higher income levels.

=== Bangladeshis and Bengalis ===
Aminur Rahim, author of an article about the Bengalis of Ontario, wrote that around 1973 a distinct Bangladeshi community was established in Toronto.

=== Indo-Caribbean people and Indo-Guyanese ===
Indo-Guyanese began moving to Toronto around 1967 due to a relaxation in Canadian immigration restrictions and simultaneously due to increased discrimination in Guyana. In 1990 Bruce Ally, the author of an article about Indo-Guyanese in Toronto, wrote that they were "relative newcomers".

When Indo-Guyanese first arrived, many of them did not find advantageous work, despite having high levels of education and skills, due to a lack of credentials, a need for adaptation to Canadian society, and racism from existing Canadians. Many of them lived in cramped dwellings and this forced elders into retirement houses; in Guyana the housing spaces are larger and accommodate entire extended families. In addition many Indo-Guyanese who first settled Toronto lived in neighbourhoods far away from worship centres, and those centres were often not majority Indo-Guyanese and did sermons in languages not understood by Indo-Guyanese. As of 1990 many Indo-Guyanese were underpaid in relation to their qualifications and skills, and compared with their political situation in their homeland they had not achieved as much political power by 1990. Indo-Guyanese students attended university at rates higher than the Canadian average due to pressure from parents and a cultural commitment to education, although the people had reduced enthusiasm for achieving this education.

=== Sri Lankans ===
A wave of Sri Lankans arrived in Toronto from 1970 to 1975. During the civil war period, a considerable amount of Sri Lankans immigrated to Canada using refugee visas. Most of them were Tamils.

== Language ==
Punjabi was historically the most common Indian language among South Asians in Toronto. As immigration from other South Asian countries increased coupled with an increase of immigration from other regions within India, the percentage of Punjabi speakers out of the total South Asian population declined. Today, Urdu, Punjabi and Tamil are the three most spoken languages in Toronto's South Asian community.

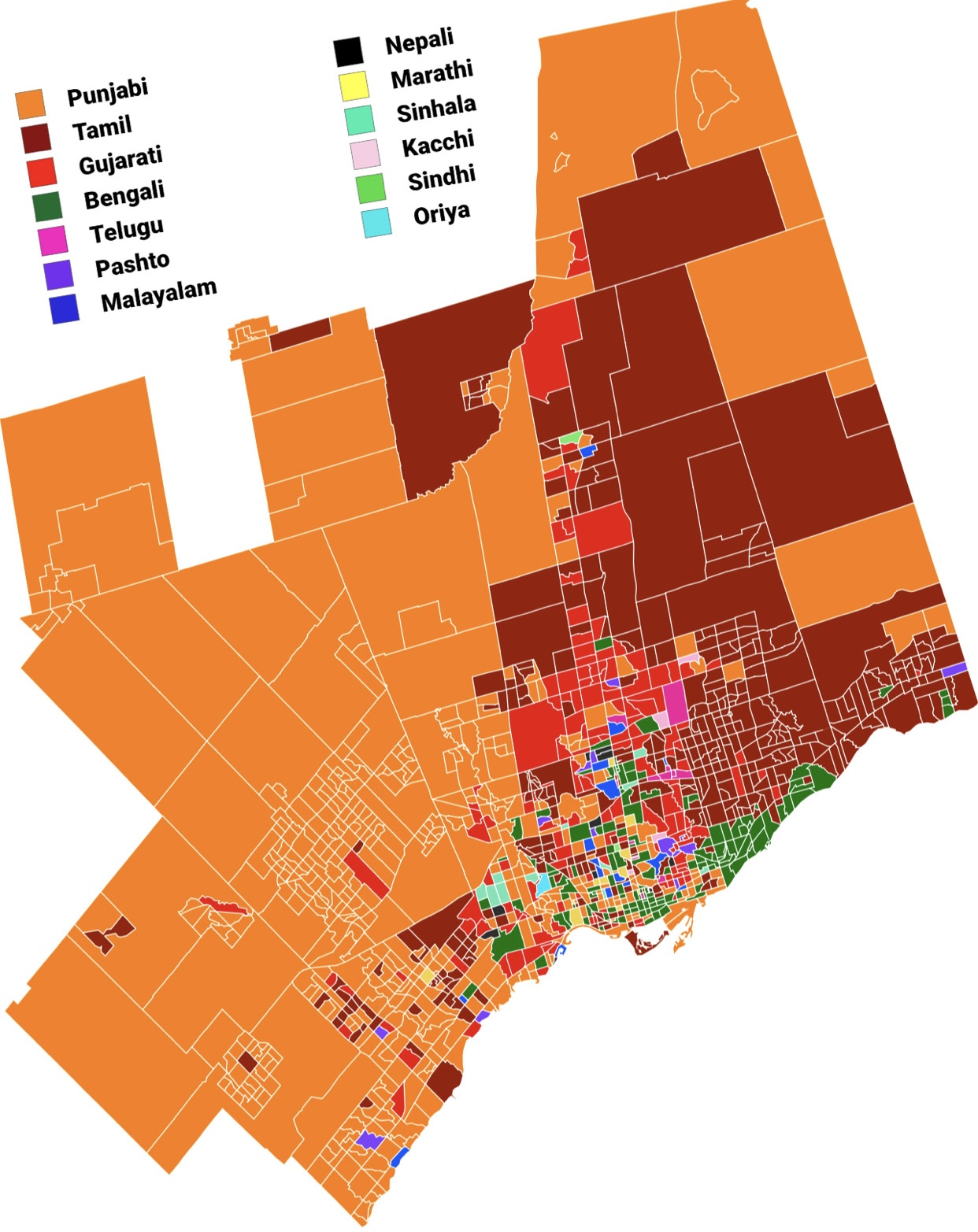
Largest South Asian language spoken (besides Hindustani) in Greater Toronto Area by census tract, 2021 census

== Media ==
Channel Punjabi programs are broadcast in the Toronto area.

In 1980 there Toronto area had several Indo-Pakistani language periodicals, including two in Gujarati and one each in Hindi and Urdu. At that time the Toronto area had no Punjabi periodicals.

== Institutions ==
The Toronto Marathi Bhashik Mandal ("Marathi Speakers' Association", Toronto's main Maharashtrian organization, was established in 1970. Ram Mulgund, an actuary in a Canadian insurance company who served as the president of Brihan Maharashtra Mandal (BMM), stated that the high level of education of Maharashtrian women meant that they were the primary persons operating the Marathi Bhashik Mandal.

== Commerce ==
In 2012 Dakshana Bascaramurty of The Globe and Mail wrote that the popularity of ethnic shopping centres declined and that many Indo-Canadians are preferring to go to mainstream retailers. Because the prices of saris and salwar kameezes are higher in Toronto than in India and South Asia, many prefer to travel to South Asia to buy the clothing items.

In 2011 there were two GTA theatres, including Albion Cinema, dedicated to showing Indian films. S. G. O. Jafry established Canada's first Indian cinema in 1969 after having shown Indian films at North Toronto high schools beginning in 1969. The Toronto area at one time had eight Indian cinemas but the rise of home video caused many to go out of business.

== Religion ==
Religious groups in Toronto which have Indo-Canadians include Hindus, Muslims, Zoroastrian Parsis, Christians, Sikhs, Jains, and Buddhists. In 2001 the Toronto region had 191,305 Hindus and 90,590 Sikhs.

Sufi Islamic sects from South Asia practised in Toronto include Chishti, Naqshbandi, and Qadri orders and Inayat Khan's Sufi Order of the West. The Sufi Circle of Toronto, originally the Society for the Understanding of the Finite and Infinite (SUFI), was founded by Dr. Mirza Qadeer Baiq, a shaikh from Ajmer, India who served as a professor in the University of Toronto Islamic Studies Department. The Sufi Circle was founded as a part of the Chishti order.

The 1981 Census of Canada stated that there were 11,620 Sikhs in the Toronto area. Philip Marchand, the author of a July 1982 Toronto Life article about Sikhs in Toronto, stated that the population was in a range of 25,000-50,000.

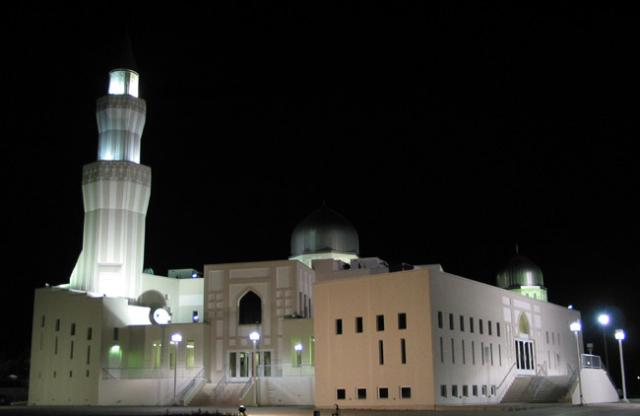
The Baitul Islam Mosque is located in Vaughan, and it was built by Toronto's Ahmadiyya Muslim community.

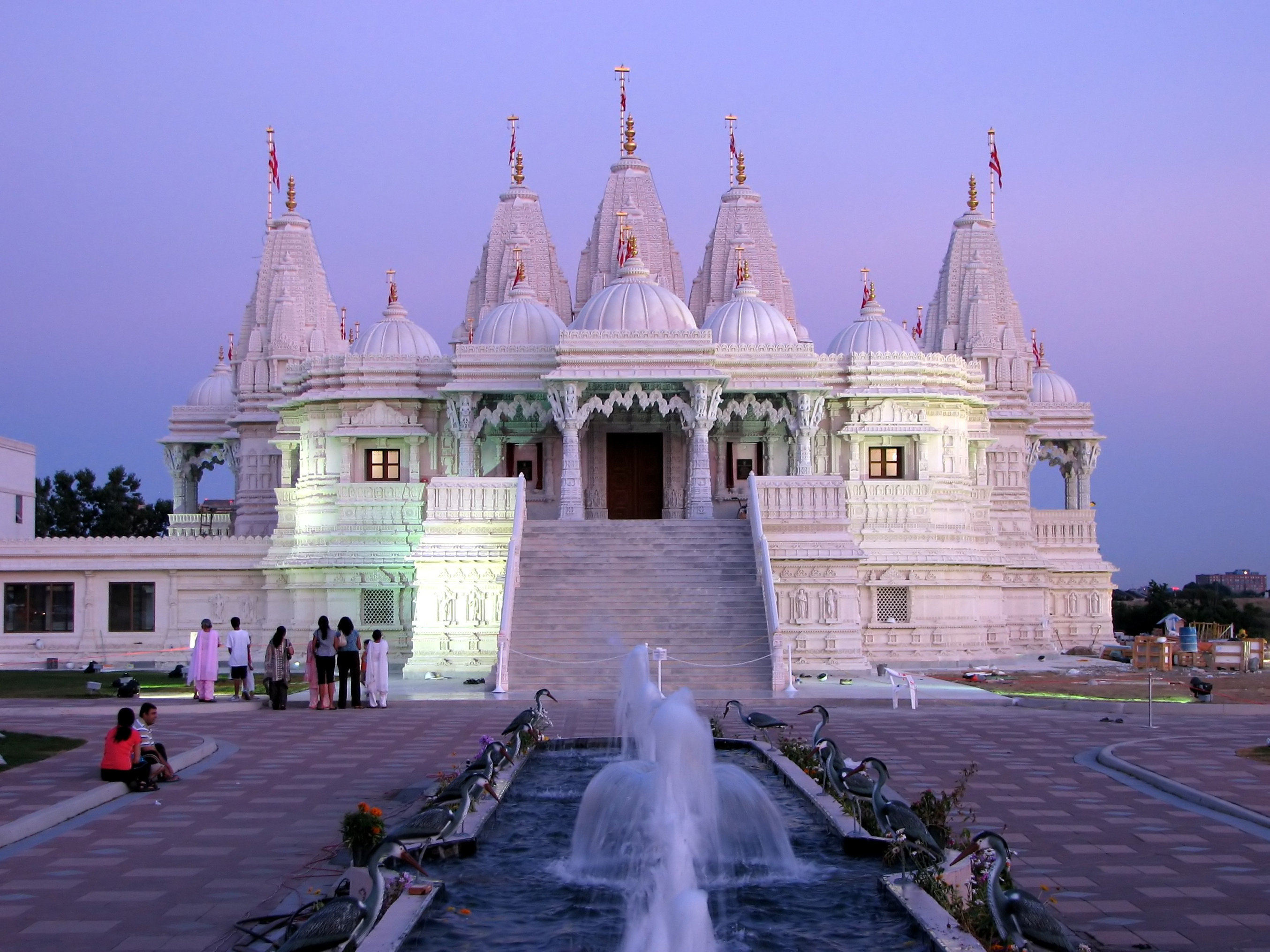
The BAPS Shri Swaminarayan Mandir Toronto is located in Etobicoke, and it was built by Toronto's Gujarati Hindu community.

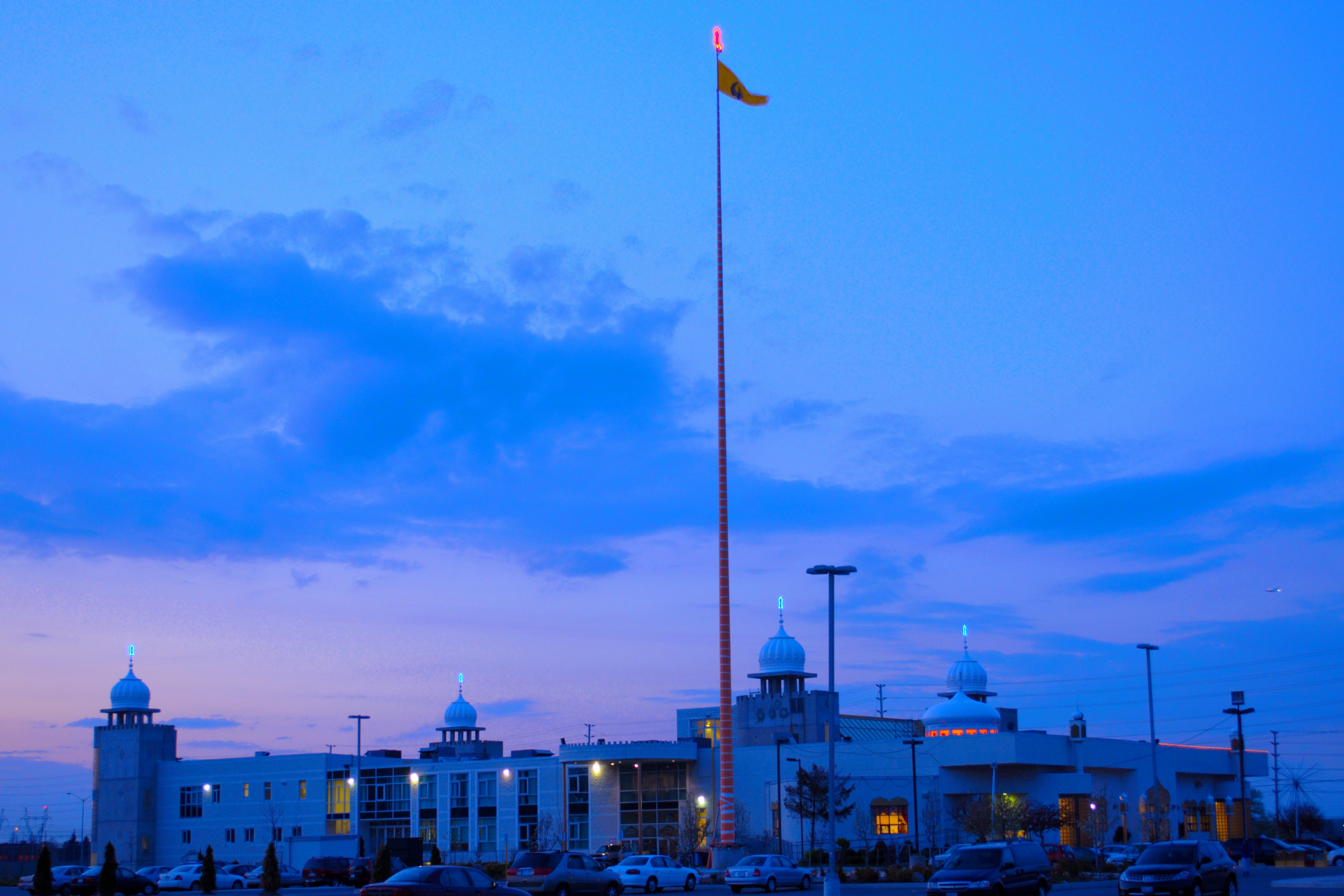
The Ontario Khalsa Darbar is located in Mississauga, and it was built by Toronto's Punjabi Sikh community.

== Education ==
As of 1990 the North York Heritage Language program supports education programs of various languages of India, including Gujarati, Punjabi, and Marathi. As of 1990 the Marathi program in Toronto was facing a decline in enrollment since the Marathi community was less concentrated and smaller than communities of other Indian languages.

The Toronto Marathi Bhashik Mandal established a Marathi language school for children in 1974, with 15 volunteer teachers, after conducting surveys in the Toronto area. It operated on Sundays with each class lasting two to three hours. It used Balabharati, Marathi texts from India, as instructional materials due to a lack of English-medium teaching materials. At the time the school had classes of five students each. A Canadian federal grant supported this program from 1978 to 1989.

== Legacy ==
There is a large statue of Mohandas Gandhi in Shanti Uddyan on Yonge Street.

== Notable residents ==
- Vasu Chanchlani
- Jus Reign
- Russell Peters
- Amrit Kaur
- Deepa Mehta
- Roger Nair
- Lata Pada
- Lilly Singh
- Maitreyi Ramakrishnan
- Iman Vellani
- Nav Bhatia
- Prem Watsa
- Sukha

== See also ==
- Indian diaspora
  - Asian Indians in the New York City metropolitan region
  - History of the Indian Americans in Metro Detroit
  - Indian community of London
  - Indians in South Africa
  - Indo-Canadian organized crime
- Pakistani diaspora
  - Pakistani community of London
  - History of the Pakistani Americans in Houston
- South Asian Canadians in Greater Vancouver
