= Erotic Stories for Punjabi Widows =

2017 novel by Balli Kaur Jaswal

First edition

Erotic Stories for Punjabi Widows is a 2017 novel by Singaporean author Balli Kaur Jaswal, published by Morrow/HarperCollins. It is the third novel written by Jaswal.

== Plot ==
The main character, Nikki Grewal, is a 22-year-old woman in London, who dropped out of law school and works at O’Reilly's pub, going against the expectations of her Punjabi Sikh family. Nikki is intrigued when her sister Mindi, a nurse who is making enough money to support herself, chooses to do an arranged marriage. She chooses to become a creative writing teacher, for the Sikh Community Association, located in Southall. Her students, older women whose husbands had died, have difficulties with English. The women begin to tell stories about their sexual lives after they encounter a copy of Red Velvet: Pleasurable Stories for Women that Nikki brought.

== Reception ==
The Economist praised the book, stating it is a "funny and moving tale of desire and its discontents."

Rosie Milne of the Asian Review of Books gave the book 3.5 stars. Milne stated that the word used are "vivid" and that the author "gives voices to women who are generally voiceless, and ignored, and she lets them talk about sex to boot."

Kirkus Reviews stated that the story "enchants".

Aparita Bhandari, a columnist for the CBC, stated that it was a "lively, sexy and thought-provoking east-meets-west story".

Saadia Faruqi, author of Brick Walls: Tales of Hope and Courage from Pakistan, described the book as "a masterpiece" and that " It entertains, it teaches, it shatters all preconceived ideas of what intra-community tensions look like."

In 2018 Reese Witherspoon added the book to her reading list. Witherspoon stated it was "a mystery, a romance, a family drama....and yes it's 🔥 🔥 🔥!"

== See also ==
- Indian community of London
