= Paramjit Singh Jaswal =

Indian Legal Education Administrator

Professor (Dr.) Paramjit S. Jaswal
- Born: Punjab
- Occupations: Educationist, Legal educator
- Spouse: Prof. Nishtha Jaswal

Paramjit S. Jaswal is an Indian academic, education administrator and professor. Presently, he is Vice Chancellor of SRM University, Haryana.

== Career ==
He is the former Vice Chancellor of Rajiv Gandhi National University of Law in Patiala, Punjab, India and the former Chairperson of Department of Laws, Panjab University, Chandigarh.

Jaswal is the recipient of a Fulbright Scholarship. In 2018, together with his wife Prof. Nishta Jaswal, VC of HP National Law University, they became the first couple to be Vice-Chancellors of the National Law Universities at the same time.

== Books ==
He has written a book on environmental Law published by the Alabad Law Agency which the Supreme Court has made reference on three separate occasions. He also wrote a chapter in the book 'Preventive Detention and Security Law: A Comparative Survey,' 'Human Rights and the Law,' Protection and Promotion of Human Rights in India,' among other publications.
