= Vethathiri Maharishi =

Indian yoga guru and philosopher

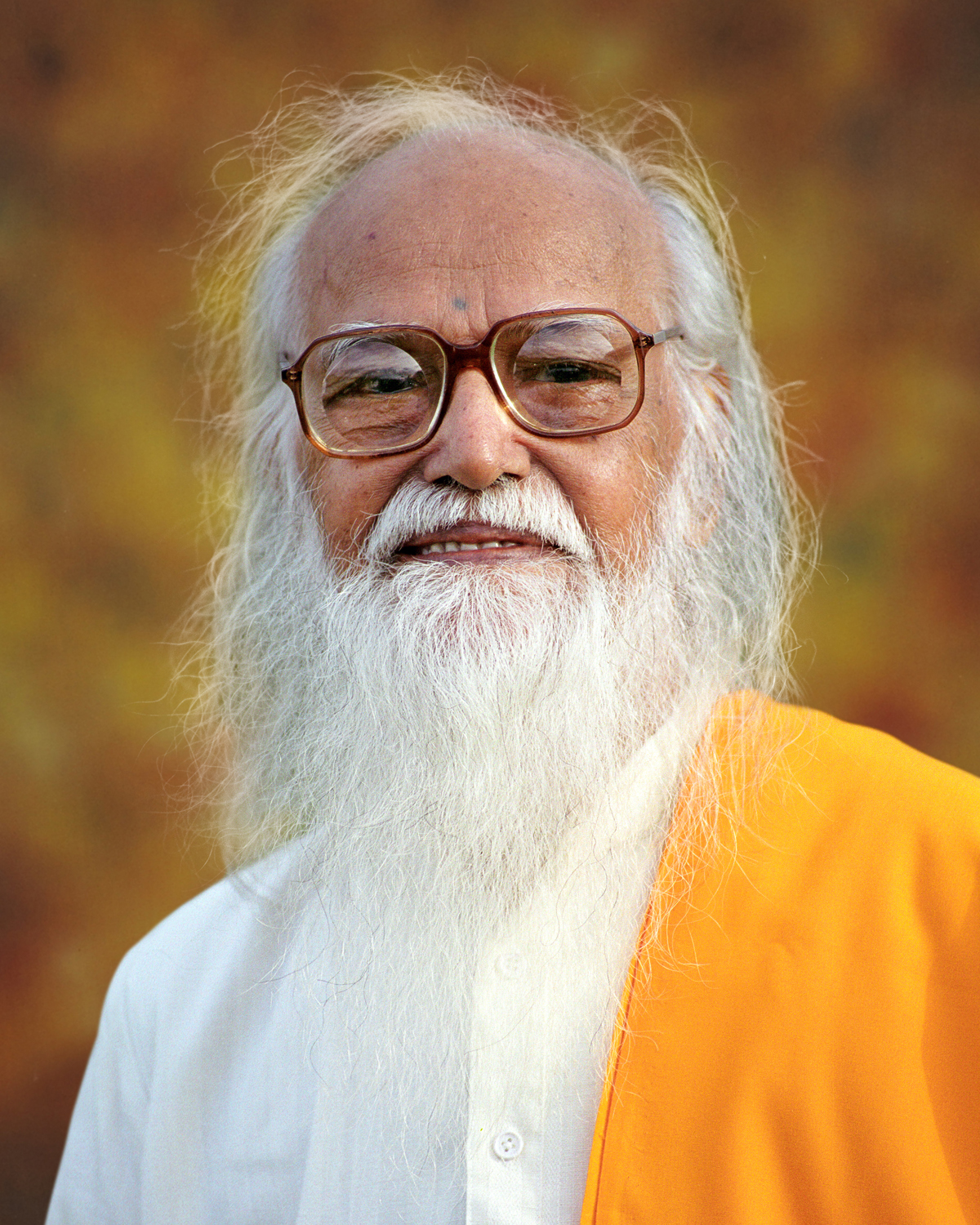
- Vethathiri Maharishi
- Born: 14 August 1911; Guduvancheri, Madras Presidency (now Tamil Nadu), India
- Died: 28 March 2006 (aged 94); Coimbatore, Tamil Nadu, India
- Other names: Pāmara makkaḷil tattuvañāṉi (Common Man's Philosopher); Aruṭtantai (Divine Father)
- Known for: Siddha Yoga; Simplified Kundalini Yoga
- Spouse: Logambal
- Parent(s): Varadappan; Chinnammal
- Website: vethathiri.edu.in

Vethathiri Maharishi (14 August 1911 – 28 March 2006) was an Indian yoga guru, philosopher and spiritual leader. He founded the World Community Service Centre (WCSC) in Chennai and established the Temple of Consciousness (Arivu Thirukkoil) at Aliyar near Coimbatore. He promoted the practice of yoga and meditation as a means of achieving spiritual awareness and thereby the development of mankind for the furtherance of human brotherhood and world peace. He evolved a simplified Kundalini Yoga combining yoga with meditation, simple exercises, and traditional medicinal practices which enabled him to teach it to the common people.

== Early life and family ==
Vethathiri was born into a Mudaliar Tamil family on August 14, 1911, in Guduvancheri near Madras in the Madras Presidency (now part of Chengalpattu district of Tamil Nadu). He was the eighth child of his parents Varadappan and Chinnammal, who were weavers. In 1916, he was enrolled for schooling at the age of five but had to drop out of school due to the poor economic situation of the family and extreme poverty.

At the age of 12, he met A. Balakrishna, who introduced him to spirituality, Advaita philosophy and devotion to God. He moved to Madras after accepting a job at a private company. There he met S. Krishna Rao, who trained him in traditional Siddha and Ayurveda medicine. Vethathiri passed the Ayurvedacharya examination conducted by the Government Medical Council to qualify as a physician and served as an aide during the Second World War. He met seer Paranjyothi, who initiated him into Kundalini Yoga and taught him philosophy and meditation techniques.

At the age of 23, he married Logambal. He engaged in multiple businesses till his late 30s and worked as a clerk with the postal department before embarking on a spiritual life.

== Spiritual life and yoga ==
While studying scriptures and reflecting on the concept of self-realization over the years, Vethathiri was inspired by Ramalinga Swamigal, after which he became more deeply involved in spirituality. He investigated social injustices, which motivated him towards a moral life with charity to share one's possessions equitably with others. He preached attaining a state of knowledge through self-realization and peaceful living.

Vethathri practiced Kundalini Yoga and developed a Simplified Kundalini Yoga (SKY), combining it with kayakalpa and simple exercises to teach it to the general public. In 1958, he founded the World Community Service Centre (WCSC) in Chennai. The WCSC was established as a non-profit, non-religious and philanthropic organization and has an ECOSOC consultative status with the United Nations. The organization operates meditation centers internationally and teaches his practices. S. K. M. Maeilanandhan serves as the President of the WCSC since 1997 and was awarded the civilian honour of the Padma Shri in 2013 for his contributions to social service.

In 1984, he established Arivu Thirukkoil (Temple of Consciousness) at Aliyar in Coimbatore district which became the center of his teaching and practices during the later part of his life.

== Teachings ==
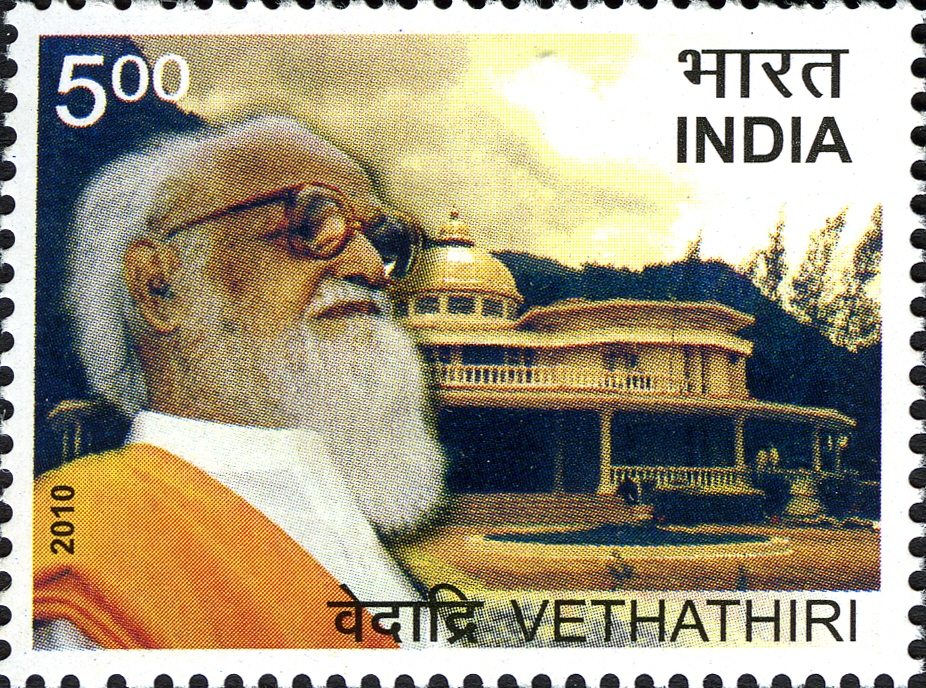
A commemorative stamp released by India Post in 2010

Vethathiri taught that "Individual Peace leads to World Peace" and emphasized that world peace is possible only when individuals live peacefully in co-existence. He believed that peace percolates to one's immediate family and society, and eventually to the whole world. He gave 14 practical points to achieve this goal, collectively termed as Vethathiriam. He integrated scientific practices with spirituality and medicine. He was referred to by followers as pāmara makkaḷil tattuvañāṉi, a Tamil phrase translated as "the Common Man’s Philosopher".

He taught that the fundamental cause of human misery is the lack of self-awareness and awareness about the relationship with others. He emphasized education as a basis for physical and mental maturity. According to Vethathiri, introspection leads to self-awareness, and yoga practices help in develop the necessary strength and character to attain it. He notes that Universe is made up of space which evolves consistently with various objects in it made up of smaller particles. According to Vethathiri, time, matter, and energy are manifestations of space and gravity itself is a manifestation of compression of particles within space.

== Death ==
Vethathri Maharishi died on 28 March 2006 after a brief illness followed by a heart attack.

== Bibliography ==
Vethathri has written more than 75 books mostly in Tamil language and later translated into others. Most of the books are on the subjects of world peace, virtues to be followed in life and practice of Yoga and meditation. He ran a monthly journal titled Arivoli for more than 35 years. Notable works include Gnana Kalanjiyam (Encyclopedia of knowledge), published in two volumes and contains 1854 songs. Other notable works include: Original from: the University of Michigan

- Vethathiri (1982). The story of my life. Vethathiri publications.
- Vethathiri (1982). Sex and spiritual development. Vethathiri publications.
- Vethathiri (1983). Simplified physical exercises. Vethathiri publications.
- Vethathiri (1983). Physical exercises for health and longetivity. Vethathiri publications.
- Vethathiri (1983). Yoga for modern age. Vethathiri publications.
- Vethathiri (1983). Karma Yoga for holistic unity. Vethathiri publications.
- Vethathiri (1990). Kayakalpa Yoga to maintain health, youthfulness and longetivity. Vethathiri Maharishi Kundalini Yoga and Kayakalpa Research Foundation.
- Vethathiri; Thomas Fitzgerald (1992). Journey of Consciousness: A Complete, Powerful, and Unique Synthesis of Revealed Yogic Truth Explicating Simplified Kundalini Yoga and Karma Yoga as a Simple, Systematic, and Scientific Path to Enable Modern Man to Achieve a Harmonious Life and Self-realization. Macmillan India. ISBN 978-0-333-92629-1.

== In popular culture ==
In 2010, India Post released a commemorative stamp honoring Vethathiri Maharishi on his hundredth birth anniversary.

Former President of India A. P. J. Abdul Kalam appreciated Maharishi's contributions and was quoted as saying that "VETHATHIRI Maharishi enlightened thousands and thousands of people with the light of consciousness."
