= Novi Town Center =

Shopping center

Coordinates: 42.4823°N 83.472°W

Novi Town Center is an open-air shopping center located at Novi Road and Grand River in Novi, Michigan, United States, in Metro Detroit. Owned by CBRE, the center is on Interstate 96, with the Twelve Oaks Mall on the other side of the road.

== History ==
Groundbreaking occurred in 1986, and the center opened in 1987. Patricia Karevich, the mayor of Novi at the time, stated that the opening was the beginning of a downtown for the city. Barbara G. Louie, author of No. VI on the Trail: A History of Novi, Michigan for the Novi Historical Commission, wrote that as a result of the development, "the focal point was drawn again to what was once Novi's main business district."

Trammell Crow developed the 485,000-square-foot (45,100 m^{2}) commercial section of the mall along with the Lake Pointe Corporate Center. The commercial and business centers took a 150-acre (61 ha) plot of land. This was one of the Trammell Crow company's two major projects in Michigan at the time.

Historically the complex had an eight-screen movie theater. It was managed by the chain Goodrich until the management was given to an Indian couple on December 1, 2005. The couple, Sonali and Rakesh Gangwani, began screening Bollywood and other Indian films on a daily basis there.

The center experienced financial difficulties in a period until 2011 due to the closure of Borders, CompUSA, and Mervyn's. In 2010 its owner at the time, the Chicago firm General Growth Properties, was in Chapter 7 bankruptcy.

Wal-Mart announced that it was considering opening a store on the site of the former Mervyn's at the center. The theater and several other businesses closed in 2010 as part of the redevelopment of Novi Town Center related to the Wal-Mart, and the theater did not reopen. The theater was not a part of the plans for expansion, and because of that, the theater did not pay any rent during its final three years of operation.

In 2011 the Novi City Council voted 5–2 to give a special land-use permit to Wal-Mart and 6–1 to a preliminary site plan approval to Wal-Mart; these votes allowed the development of the store to proceed. The Wal-Mart opened in 2012, making it the 86th superstore in Michigan. The Wal-Mart store, on a 12.8-acre (5.2 ha) lot, takes up 152,888 square feet (14,203.8 m^{2}) of space. Greta Guest of the Detroit Free Press stated that new retailers planned to open as the Wal-Mart was developed.
