= Jainism in the United Kingdom =

British Jains
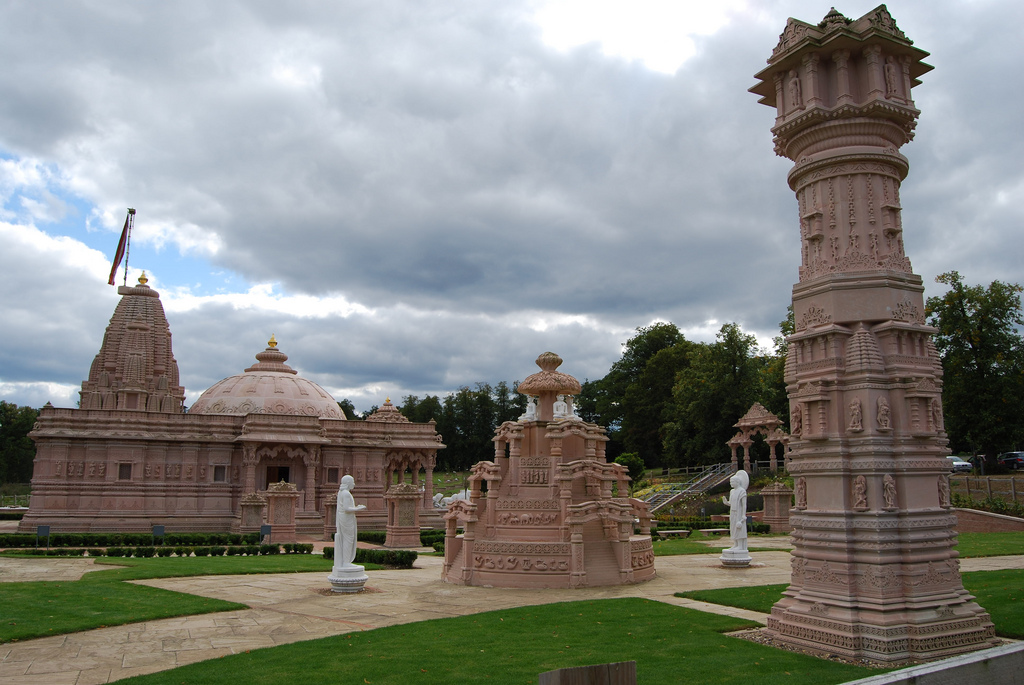
- Jain Temple Oshwal Centre, Potters Bar, Hertfordshire, UK

Total population
- 25,035 (2021 census, excluding Scotland)

Religions
- Jainism

Languages
- English; Indian Languages

Adherents of Jainism first arrived in the United Kingdom in the 19th century. Britain, mainly England, has since become a center of the Jain diaspora with a population of 40,000 in 2007. The 2021 United Kingdom census recorded a population of 24,991 Jains in England and Wales, and 44 Jains in Northern Ireland.

== History ==
In 1873 Hermann Jacobi encountered Jain texts in London. He later visited India to further study and translate some of them. Later during 1891–1901, Mahatma Gandhi in London corresponded with Shrimad Rajchandra regarding questions raised by missionaries.

Champat Rai Jain was in England during 1892–1897, to study law. He established the Rishabh Jain Lending library 1930. Later he translated several Jain texts into English.

During 1906–1910, Jugmandar Lal Jaini was at Oxford as a law student. In 1909 he created the Jain Literature Society in London together with F. W. Thomas and H. Warren.

In 1949 The World Jaina Mission was founded in London, by M. McKay, W. H. Talbot, F. Mansell, and Mrs. K. P. Jain.

== Exodus of Asians from East Africa ==
After the independence of the various East African colonies in early 1960s, Jains of Gujarati origin who had been in the colonies for decades started moving to UK. This process accelerated after the 1972 Idi Amin expulsion of Asians from Uganda. Most of the Gujarati Jains from East Africa belonged either to the Visa Oshwal community, originally from the Halar region of Saurashtra or the Jamnagar Srimali community .

== Jain Samaj Leicester ==
In 1973 the Jain Samaj Leicester was formed. In 1979 an old church building on Oxford Street, in the heart of Leicester, was bought and named the Jain Centre. In 1980, the Jain Samaj was expanded as a European body.

In 1982, the Jain Samaj opened an office in London. The All India (Overseas) Jinalaya Samiti was created to complete the temple according to the plans drawn by the architects from Leicester, Bombay and Ahmedabad.

In 1983, on 10 November, Shilanyas ceremony (the laying of the foundation stones) for the first fully consecrated Jain temple in the western world, was performed. In 1984, on 14 December, the Anjanshalaka ceremony was carried at Pali for the images of Shantinath, Mahavir and Parswanath. In 1985, on 25 August, the above images were placed in the Jain Centre, Leicester. In 1988, on 8 July, the images were entered in the Garbagriha (permanent place of adobe) and the Pratistha ceremony was celebrated for 16 days from 8 July 1988 to 23 July 1988.

== British Jain temples and institutes ==
- Leicester Jain Centre
- Jain Samaj Leicester and Temple
- Jain Samaj Manchester - Jain temple and community centre]
- Jain Samaj Wellingborough and temple
- Jain Samaj Thornton Heath (Croydon)
- Jain Samaj Potters Bar - Jain temple and community centre
- Kailash Giri Jain temple, London
- Mahavir Foundation temple (Kenton derasar), 557 Kenton Road, Kenton, Middlesex
- Shri Mahavir Swami Jain Temple, Harrow, London
- Oshwal Centre, Hertfordshire. First on virgin ground in Europe. (Oshwal is the largest Jain organisation in the UK).
- Institute of Jainology (IOJ) at Greenford, London.
- Shrimad Rajchandra Mission Dharampur London Spiritual Centre, Bushey

In 2020, Historic England (HE) published A Survey of Jain Buildings in England with the aim of providing information about buildings that Jains use in England so that HE can work with communities to enhance and protect those buildings now and in the future. The scoping survey identified 27 Jain Buildings.

== Gallery ==
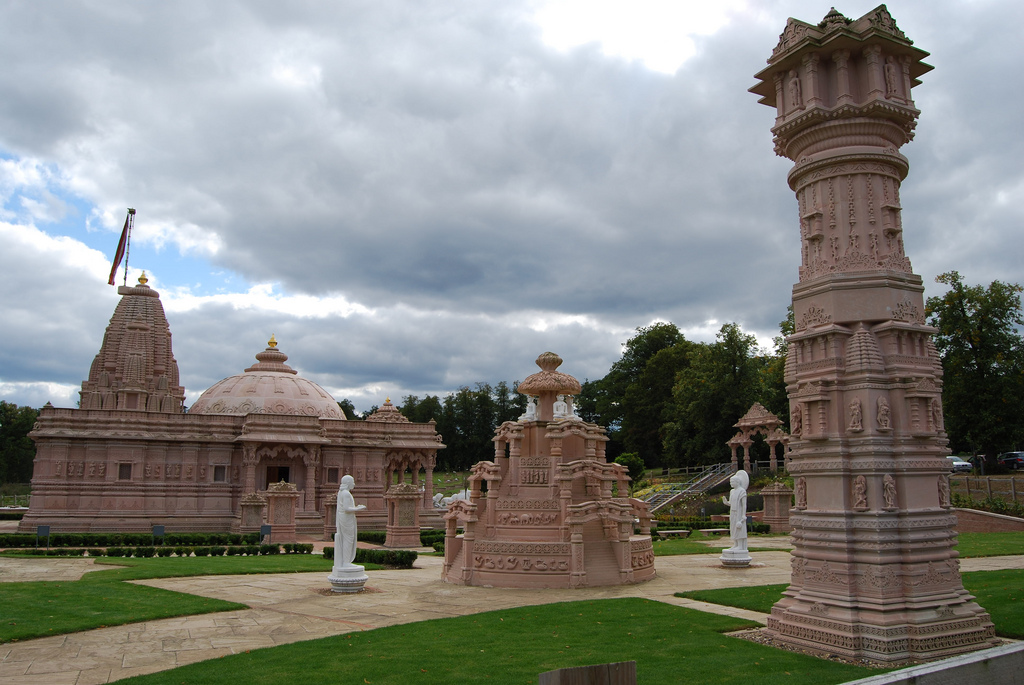
Jain Temple, Potters Bar, Hertfordshire

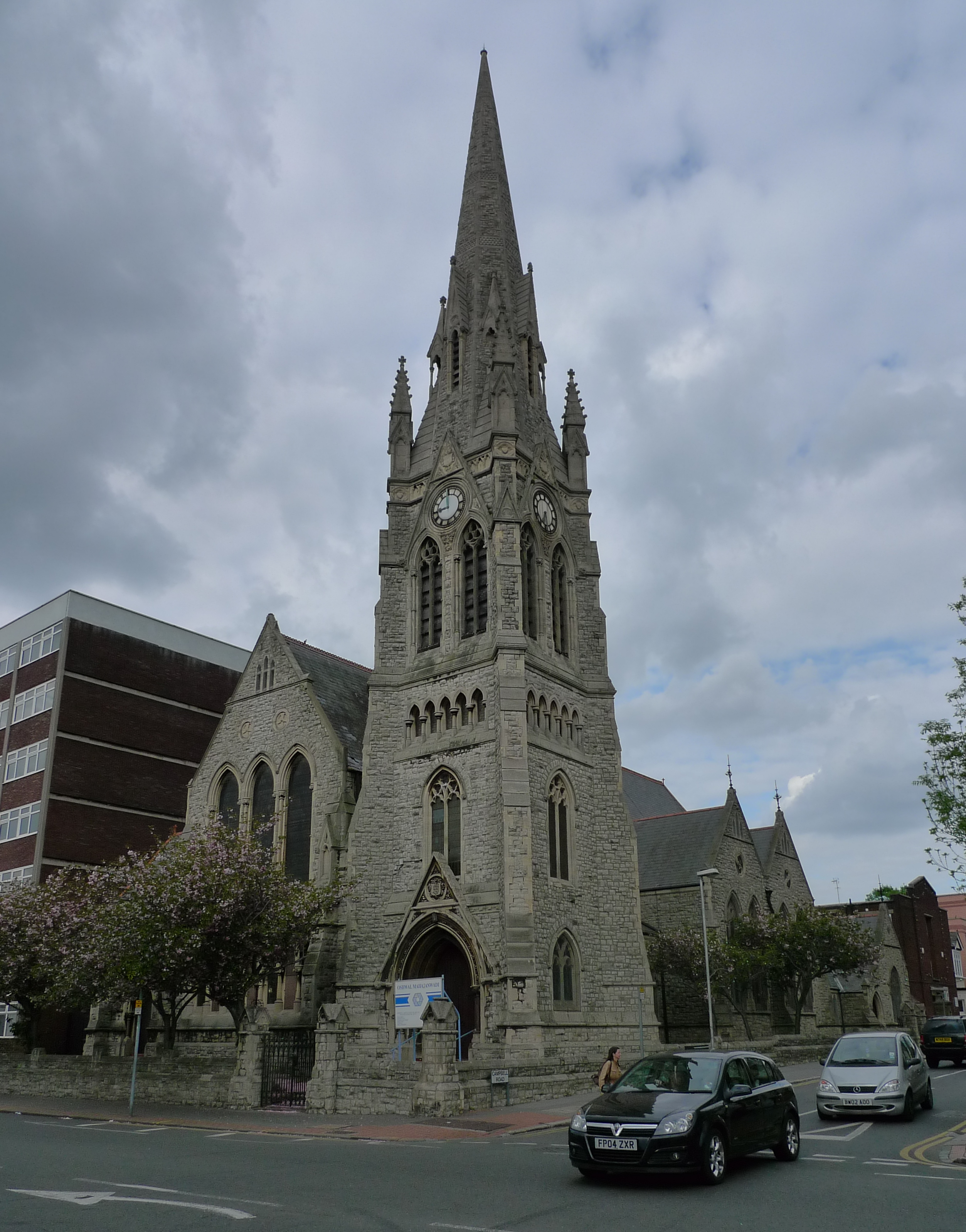
Oshwal Mahajanwadi, Croydon

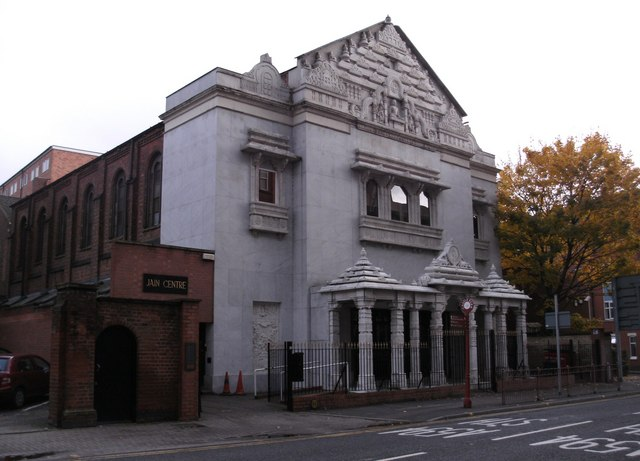
The Jain Centre in Oxford Street, Leicester

== See also ==
- Jainism in India
- Jainism in Europe
- Jainism in the United States
- Jainism in Australia
- Jainism in Japan
- Jainism in Africa
- Jainism in Singapore
