= SRM Institute of Science and Technology =

Private university in Tamil Nadu, India

Coordinates: 12°49′25″N 80°2′39″E

- Other name: SRM University
- Former name: SRM Engineering College
- Motto: Learn. Leap. Lead.
- Type: Private, Deemed University
- Established: 1985; 41 years ago
- Founder: T. R. Paarivendhar
- Accreditation: NAAC
- Academic affiliations: UGC
- Chancellor: T. R. Paarivendhar
- Vice-Chancellor: Dr. C. Muthamizhchelvan
- Location: Potheri, Chennai, Tamil Nadu, 603203, India
- Campus: 250 acres (100 ha); Rural
- Language: English, Tamil
- Colors: Dark Blue, White & Gold
- Website: www.srmist.edu.in

SRM Institute of Science and Technology (SRMIST) is a private deemed university located in Kattankulathur, near Chennai, Tamil Nadu, India. Founded in 1985 as SRM Engineering College in Kattankulathur, it gained deemed university status in 2002. SRM Institute of Science and Technology is spread across six campuses including with its headquarters in Kattankulathur, under section 3 of the University Grants Commission Act, 1956. It has three sister universities: SRM University Andhra Pradesh in Amaravati, SRM University Haryana in Sonipat, and SRM University Sikkim in Gangtok.

== History ==
SRM (Shri Ramasamy Memorial) Engineering College was established in 1985, followed by other SRM colleges between 1992 and 1997. The institute gained deemed status in 2002 as SRM Institute of Science and Technology, and was later renamed SRM University in 2006. In 2017, its name was reverted to SRM Institute of Science and Technology following a UGC directive to drop "University" from the names of deemed-to-be universities.

== Campuses ==
Located about 35 km (22 mi) from the city of Chennai, the main campus is situated on a 250-acre site overlooking the Grand Southern Trunk Road (GST Road), NH-32. The main campus at Kattankulathur houses the College of Engineering and Technology, the College of Medicine and Health Sciences, the College of Science and Humanities, the School of Management, the School of Architecture, and the School of Law. It also offers a degree in Telecom studies.

== SRM University Campus List ==
S.No.	University / Campus Name	Location (City, State)	Type
1	SRM Institute of Science and Technology (Main Campus)	Kattankulathur, Chennai, Tamil Nadu	Deemed-to-be University
2	SRM IST – Ramapuram Campus	Chennai, Tamil Nadu	Deemed-to-be University (Branch)
3	SRM IST – Vadapalani Campus	Chennai, Tamil Nadu	Deemed-to-be University (Branch)
4	SRM IST – Delhi-NCR Campus	Modinagar (Ghaziabad), Uttar Pradesh	Deemed-to-be University (Branch)
5	SRM IST – Tiruchirappalli (Trichy) Campus	Tiruchirappalli, Tamil Nadu	Deemed-to-be University (Branch)
6	SRM University, Sonepat	Sonepat, Haryana	Private University
7	SRM University, Andhra Pradesh	Amaravati, Andhra Pradesh	Private University
8	SRM University, Sikkim	Gangtok, Sikkim	Private University

== Locations ==
=== Ramapuram campus ===
The Ramapuram campus is located in Chennai, Tamil Nadu. It offers undergraduate, postgraduate, and doctoral programmes in fields such as engineering, management, science, and humanities. The campus is equipped with laboratories, libraries, and other facilities to support the academic and extracurricular activities of students.

=== Vadapalani campus ===
The Vadapalani campus is located at Vadapalani, Chennai. It houses the Faculty of Engineering and Technology, the Faculty of Management, and the Faculty of Science and Humanities. The SRM Institute for Medical Sciences is also located within the campus.

=== Tiruchirappalli campus ===
The 250-acre (100 ha) campus in Trichy, on the Trichy–Chennai highway, houses the faculties of Engineering & Technology, Science & Humanities, Allied Medical Science, and Management.

== Academics ==
=== Rankings ===
Academic rankings

General – international
- QS (World) (2023): 1201-1400
- QS (Asia) (2023): 301-350
- QS (Asia) (2024): 271-280

General – India
- NIRF (Overall) (2022): 36
- NIRF (Overall) (2023): 32
- NIRF (Universities) (2022): 19
- NIRF (Universities) (2023): 18

Engineering – India
- NIRF (2022): 24
- NIRF (2023): 27

Pharmacy – India
- NIRF (2022): 12
- NIRF (2023): 15

The QS World University Rankings ranked SRM Institute of Science and Technology 221st in Asia in 2025.

SRM Institute of Science and Technology was ranked 29th among engineering colleges in India by India Today in 2020. The National Institutional Ranking Framework (NIRF) ranked it 13th in engineering, 11th in pharmacy, 12th among universities, 24th in research, and 21st overall in the NIRF 2024 rankings.

== Notable alumni ==
- Sriram Krishnan, Senior Policy Advisor for AI at the White House
- Nivetha Thomas, actress
- Murali Vijay, cricketer
- Vishnu Vishal, actor
- Iswarya Menon, film actress
- Neeraj Madhav, actor
- Varun Chakravarthy, cricketer
- Abhay Jodhpurkar, singer
- Shebin Benson, actor
- Vishnu Prasanna V., chess grandmaster and coach of Gukesh D
- Karthik Venkataraman, chess grandmaster
- Shrutika, actress
- Manimegalai, TV host

== See also ==
- SRM University, Andhra Pradesh
- Potheri
- Thailavaram
