= Punjab Legal Services Authority =

The Punjab Legal Services Authority is a statutory organization in Punjab State, India, founded in 1998 to provide legal aid in the state.
