= SRM University, Andhra Pradesh =

Private university in Andhra Pradesh, India

- Other names: SRM University, Amaravati
- Type: Private
- Established: 2017
- Affiliations: UGC
- Chancellor: Dr. T. R. Paarivendhar
- Vice-Chancellor: Prof. Ch. Satish Kumar
- Location: Amaravati, Andhra Pradesh, India; 16°27′47″N 80°30′24″E
- Campus: 100 acres (40 ha); Suburb
- Website: srmap.edu.in

SRM University-AP, Andhra Pradesh (SRMAP) is a state private university located near Neerukonda village in Mangalagiri mandal of Guntur district in Andhra Pradesh, India, in the area of the planned capital city Amaravati. The university was established in 2017 by the SRM Trust through the Andhra Pradesh Private Universities (Establishment and Regulation) Act, 2016. It offers undergraduate, postgraduate courses and Ph.D programmes in engineering, liberal arts and basic sciences, commerce and management.

== Academics ==
SRM University, Andhra Pradesh offers undergraduate, postgraduate and Ph.D programmes through its three schools – School of Engineering and Sciences (SEAS), Easwari School of Liberal Arts (ESLA) and Paari School of Business (PSB).

The School of Engineering & Applied Sciences was launched in 2017 and was later renamed as School of Engineering and Sciences. The School of Liberal Arts & Basic Sciences was launched in 2018 and renamed as the Easwari School of Liberal Arts in 2023.

In 2018, a three-year BBA Programme was started under the aegis of the School of Liberal Arts and Basic Sciences (SLABS) at SRM University-AP. In 2020, an independent school of Business was created as the School of Entrepreneurship and Management Studies (SEAMS) with a BBA (Honours) Programme, MBA Programme in Data Science, Banking and Finance and a PhD Programme. In 2021, SEAMS launched a new MBA Programme specialising in Marketing, Finance and Human Resource Management. SEAMS was rechristened as the Paari School of Business with a BBA (Honours) Programme, MBA Programme, and EMBA programme in 2023.

Currently, the university offers B.Tech., M.Tech., B.Sc., M.Sc., Integrated M.Tech., Ph.D. and Post-Doc programmes in the School of Engineering and Sciences, B.A. (Hons.)/ B.A, B.Sc. (Hons.)/B.Sc. and Ph.D. programmes in the Esawari School of Liberal Arts and B.Com. (Hons.)/ B.Com., BBA (Hons.), MBA and Ph.D. programmes in Paari School of Business.

== Leadership ==
The university is led by the Pro-chancellor Dr P. Sathyanarayanan, who serves in this position since the university’s establishment in 2017. Prof. Ch Satish Kumar currently serves as the Vice Chancellor of the university, leading both academic and research faculties.

The inaugural vice-chancellor (VC) of the university was Jamshed Bharucha who was appointed to this position in July 2018. Bharucha was replaced with Vajja Sambasiva Rao in 2020. In 2022, Manoj K. Arora took his place as VC, and upon completion of his tenure, from September 2025, Prof. Ch Satish Kumar has been appointed as the Vice Chancellor – SRM University, Andhra Pradesh.

== Campus ==
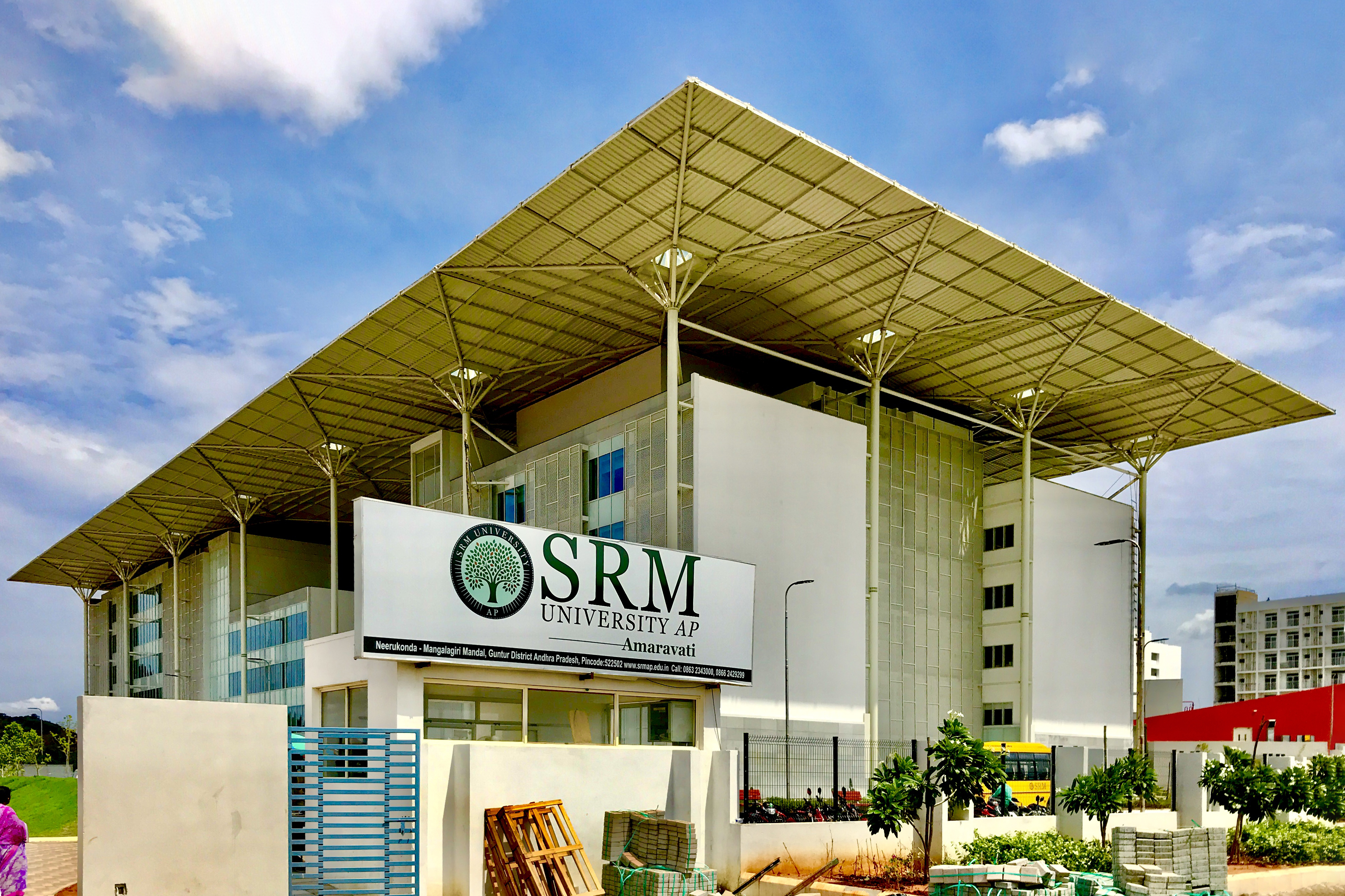
SRM University, Amaravathi entrance

The campus is designed by Perkins and Will, an American architectural firm, and PTK Architects, an architectural firm based in Chennai, India. It has hostel facilities for about 4000+ students and faculty, in five apartments.

== Rankings ==
- Debuted in the QS Asia University Rankings 2027, ranked among the top 100 in Southern Asia and the top 51 in India, and as the highest-ranked university in Andhra Pradesh among government and private institutions.
- Ranked 1001–1200 globally in the Times Higher Education (THE) World University Rankings 2027, among the youngest private universities in India to achieve this distinction; ranked 5th in India for International Outlook.
- QS I-GAUGE Diamond Rating
- QS I-GAUGE Institute of Happiness (IOH) Award 2026
- Ranks No.1 as "The New-Age Emerging University" by IIRF 2025)
- 1st rank among Top Emerging Institutes-Overall, 1st rank among Emerging Engineering Institutes-Placement, Secured 1st rank among Emerging Engineering Institutes-Research Capability (Times Engineering)
- National Best Private University, Best Business School (awarded to Paari School of Business, Excellence in Smart Campus & Classroom Infrastructure by The Hans India (2025) "The New-Age Emerging University" by IIRF 2025)
- One of the Best Universities with Excellent Placement of the Year – India by Asia Today Media (2025) )
- Best Emerging University with Academic Excellence in India (Asia Education Summit and Awards 2023)
- SRM University-AP ranked 3rd best private university in Nature Index Ranking
- The Economic Times Best Brands Award (2022)

== See also ==
- SRM Institute of Science and Technology
- SRM University, Haryana
