= Balli Kaur Jaswal =

Singaporean novelist

Balli Kaur Jaswal is a Singaporean novelist. Her first novel Inheritance won the Sydney Morning Herald's Best Young Australian Novelist Award in 2014, and was adapted for a film presented at the 2017 Singapore International Festival of the Arts. Her second novel Sugarbread was a finalist for the 2015 inaugural Epigram Books Fiction Prize. Her third novel, Erotic Stories for Punjabi Widows was released in 2017, and garnered her a wider international following, driven in part by being picked as a selection for Reese Witherspoon's Hello Sunshine online book club. Movie rights for Erotic Stories for Punjabi Widows have been sold to Scott Free Productions and Film4. In 2019, the Business Times described Jaswal as "the most internationally well-known Singapore novelist after Crazy Rich Asians’ Kevin Kwan."

== Personal life ==
Jaswal was born in Singapore; her family moved internationally during her childhood, following her father's career in the Ministry of Foreign Affairs. She lived in Singapore from the ages of eight to 15, and also lived in Japan, Russia, the Philippines growing up. She studied English at Hollins University in the United States and graduated in 2004. In 2007, she was awarded the David T.K. Wong Fellowship for writing at University of East Anglia in the United Kingdom, which supports English-language writing about Asia. During the early part of her career, Jaswal taught high-school English in Australia for several years, and taught at an international school in Istanbul. She gave up teaching in 2016 when the sale of her novel Erotic Stories for Punjabi Widows allowed her to take up writing full-time. She is married to Paul Howell; they have a son born in 2018.

== Career ==
Jaswal began writing her first novel, Sugarbread, while she was in college but has said that she did not know enough yet about writing novels, so it was not the first to see publication. With more experience, she wrote and published Inheritance in 2013. She was motivated to return to Sugarbread when Singaporean publisher Epigram Books established a prize for unpublished manuscripts; she revised and the manuscript, and it won $5000 as the runner up in the contest. These first two novels are set in Singapore; her third novel, Erotic Stories for Punjabi Widows, is set in the largely Punjabi neighborhood of Southall in London. Her fourth novel, The Unlikely Adventures of the Shergill Sisters, is primarily set in India.

She is known for writing about socially challenging subjects, especially challenging within the strictures of her native Singaporean context. Her novels deal with homosexuality, mental health, racism, patriarchy, and honor killings. In May 2017, Jaswal wrote an op-ed piece for the New York Times entitled "The Censor and the Vibrator" in which she addressed the challenges of living under Singaporean government censorship, including growing up with a skewed and incomplete understanding of sex.

Jaswal has been seen both as a voice of the Punjabi diaspora, and a critic of Punjabi communities. In an interview with the Indian newspaper The Hindu she disputes the notion that members of the diaspora are inherently more progressive than those in India. Many of her characters do take more progressive stances and challenge authority, however, which has drawn some criticism that she portrays Punjabi communities in a poor light. Speaking to The Deccan Chronicle, Jaswal said "Identity is a major theme in all my works, and I haven’t strayed far from Punjabi female characters because there’s still so much work to do in telling their stories." Reluctant to be "pigeon-holed" as solely as a writer of the Punjabi diaspora, Jaswal said in 2019 that her next novel would feature Filipino domestic workers in Singapore.

=== Inheritance ===
Jaswal's first published novel, Inheritance, was developed during her Wong Fellowship at the University of East Anglia. The novel explores social changes in Singapore from the 1970 to the 1990 through the lens of a Sikh family of Punjabi descent living in Singapore. The family, headed by widower policeman Harbeer, includes an eldest son dismissed from the army on suspicion of homosexuality, a daughter troubled by mental illness, a conservative younger son, and an ambitious nephew.

Writing for The Australian, Ed Wright described Inheritance as "pellucid and evocative", building "its world simultaneously with anthropological awareness and intimacy", and praised its psychological realism. Another critic, Peter Pierce praised Jaswal's creativity even as he saw room for improvement in the writing of her first novel; he write that Jaswal "makes a debut of an imaginative boldness and assurance not yet matched by the quality of its prose, but we are tantalised by the thought of what she will do next."

=== Sugarbread ===
Singapore is the setting for Jaswal's second novel, Sugarbread as well. The central character, Pin (short for Parveen), is a ten-year-old girl from a Sikh family but attending a Christian school. The story follows tensions in Pin's home as her grandmother comes to live with her family, disrupting a previously relaxed environment with a strict adherence to Sikh cultural practices. Pin's mother, Jini, becomes more reserved, and her previously wide-ranging and expressive cooking becomes monotonous, routine, and very traditional. Pin learns of the tensions between her mother and grandmother at home, she is exposed to the cruelty of racism at school and the pressure to conform.

Shuma Raha, reviewer for the Indian newspaper The Hindu describes the novel as "comfort" reading "refreshingly free from [the] nostalgia-soaked cultural clutter" that can be typical of diaspora novels. She notes, however, that the "only problem" with the book is that the mature voice of the book strains its credibility as that of ten-year-olds viewpoint. Nur Asyiqin Mohamad Salleh of the Singaporean newspaper The Straits Times called Sugarbread "a complex, layered story worth multiple re-reads" that fills an "important gap in Singapore literature with its portrayal of the Punjabi-Sikh community." Salleh notes that while the novel is written with "nuance and sensitivity", the foreshadowing of the central mystery in the book is "jarring" and "heavy-handed". Salleh finds the novel both personal and culturally-aware, with an attention to Singapore's tensions over racial and cultural challenges.

=== Erotic Stories for Punjabi Widows ===
Jaswal's third novel Erotic Stories for Punjabi Widows (2017) garnered her significant international attention, including reviews in The Economist and Kirkus Reviews, and was featured in Reese Witherspoon's Hello Sunshine Book Club. The translation rights have been sold in over ten countries, and the movie rights were purchased by Scott Free Productions and Film4. The novel is set in London, including the Punjabi neighborhood of Southall, where the protagonist Nikki takes a job teaching a creative writing class at the Sikh community center. The class evolves into an erotic storytelling workshop, largely attended by the elderly women of community, risking censure from more conservative forces in the community. As the story progresses, Nikki becomes interested in the deaths of women in the community accused of dishonorable behavior, and attracts unwanted attention as she investigates the truth.

The Economist describes the novel as a mix of "darkness and light, social commentary and ecstatic escapism" and notes that the publisher Random House paid an unspecified "six-figure sum" (presumably in British pounds) for the book. Kirkus calls the book "by turns erotic, romantic, and mysterious." In promoting the novel, Reese Witherspoon described it as a "story about liberating women at every age, and empowering them to express their hopes, their dreams and what makes them feel good."

=== The Unlikely Adventures of the Shergill Sisters ===
The Unlikely Adventures of the Shergill Sisters was published in 2019. It follows three British-born sisters fulfilling their mother's dying wish for them to conduct a pilgrimage in Punjab to sites important in their Sikh heritage. Each of the three main characters carries a secret that she is reluctant to share with her sisters, and each carries some guilt about the circumstances of their mother's death. The story's events bring the sisters into conflict over old family tensions, and bring them closer through a growing understanding of each other.

Reviewer Indira Chandrasekhar sees the novel's approach as using humor to provide some lightness while she takes on patriarchy as a serious problem throughout the novel. Another reviewer, Sindhuri Nandhakumar, notes a similar pattern, writing that "topics like female infanticide and widowhood are interspersed with goof-ball moments, but the humour does not hide the fact that the author is critical of her community."

== Novels ==
- Inheritance (Sleepers Publishing, 2013)
- Sugarbread (2014)
- Erotic Stories for Punjabi Widows (Harper Collins/William Morrow, 2017)
- The Unlikely Adventures of the Shergill Sisters (Harper Collins/William Morrow, 2019)
- Now You See Us (Harper Collins/William Morrow, 2023)
