= SRM University, Haryana =

Private university in Haryana, India

SRM University, Delhi-NCR, Sonepat
- Other names: SRM University, Haryana
- Motto: Learn, Leap, Lead
- Type: Private
- Established: 2013
- Affiliations: UGC, AIU, BCI
- Endowment: ₹7-8 crores
- Chancellor: Dr. Ravi Pachamuthu
- Vice-Chancellor: Dr. Paramjit S. Jaswal
- Visitor: Governor of Haryana
- Administrative staff: 400-500
- Location: Sonepat, Haryana, India
- Campus: 47.8 acres
- Website: www.srmuniversity.ac.in

SRM University, Haryana (SRMUH), also known as SRM University, Delhi-NCR, Sonepat, is a state private university located at the Rajiv Gandhi Education City in Sonepat, Haryana, India. The university was established in 2013 by the SRM Institute of Science & Technology Trust (SRM IST Trust), Chennai through The Haryana Private Universities (Amendment) Act, 2013. The university is part of the SRM Educational Group which also includes the parent deemed university, SRM Institute of Science and Technology, headquartered in Chennai, and two other sister universities, SRM University, Andhra Pradesh and SRM University, Sikkim, among other institutes.

== Campus ==
SRMH, located in Rajiv Gandhi Education City, Sonipat, near Delhi, has a campus spread over about 47.5 acres (0.192 km^{2}). It includes separate hostels for boys and girls, a pharmacy, a stationery shop, a provisional outlet and a gym.

== Departments ==
The university comprises the following departments:

- Biomedical Engineering
- Biotechnology & Biochemistry
- Chemistry
- Civil Engineering
- Commerce
- Computer Science & Engineering
- Electrical and Electronics Engineering
- Electronics and Communication Engineering
- English
- Law
- Management Studies
- Mathematics
- Mechanical Engineering
- Physics
- Physical Education and Sports

== Recognition and accreditation ==
Like all private universities in India, SRM University, Haryana is recognized by the University Grants Commission (UGC) which has also an expert committee to the university. The university is also recognized by the Association of Indian Universities (AIU) and approved by the Bar Council of India (BCI).
