= Guduvancheri =

- Suburb of Chennai
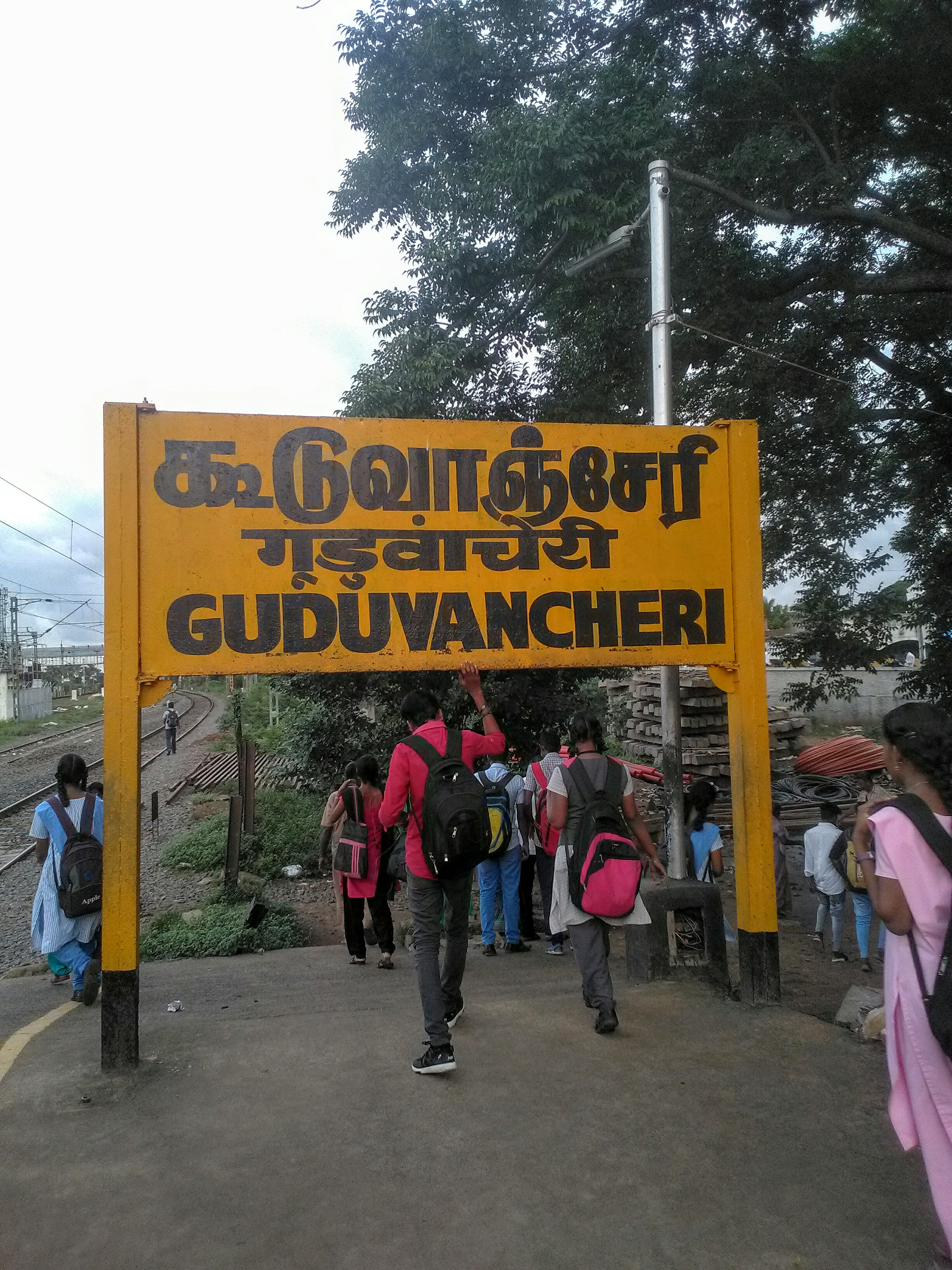
- Guduvancheri railway station

- Location within Chennai Location within Tamil Nadu Location within India
- Coordinates: 12.84506°N 80.05707°E
- Country: India
- State: Tamil Nadu
- District: Chengalpattu
- Taluk: Vandalur
- Metro: Chennai Metropolitan Area

Population (2011)
  - Total: 44,098

official
  - Language: Tamil
- Time zone: UTC+5:30 (IST)
- PIN: 603202
- Vehicle registration: TN-19

Guduvancheri is a southern suburb of the Indian city of Chennai. It forms part of the Nandivaram-Guduvancheri municipality in Chengalpattu district. As per the 2011 census, Guduvancheri had a population of 44,098 individuals. It forms part of the Chengalpattu Assembly constituency and Kancheepuram Lok Sabha constituency. It is a part of the Chennai Metropolitan Area.

Guduvancheri is located on the National Highway 32. It is served by the Guduvancheri railway station, which forms part of the South Line of the Chennai Suburban Railway Network.
