= Kuthambakkam Mofussil Bus Terminus =

Bus station in Chennai, India

Kuthambakkam Mofussil Bus Terminus Anna Arignar Bus Terminus
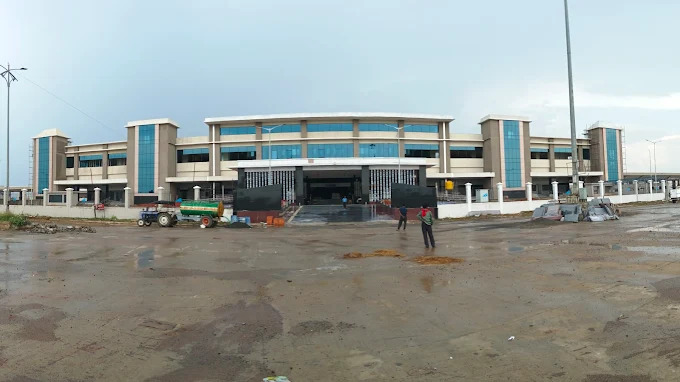
- Front View of Station

General information
- Other names: Thirumaizhai Bus Stand
- Location: Thirumazhisai Satellite Township; Tamil Nadu; India
- Coordinates: 13.0481°N 80.0464°E
- System: Bus Terminus
- Owner: CMDA
- Operator: CMDA
- Platforms: 200
- Bus routes: Tamil Nadu; Karnataka; Chennai Metropolitan Area
- Bus operators: TNSTC; SETC; MTC; KSRTC; NWKRTC; KKRTC
- Connections: Yellow Line ("Future"): MTC; Thirumaizhai Railway Station (TBD)

Construction
- Structure type: At-grade
- Parking: Yes
- Cycle facilities: Yes
- Accessible: Yes

Other information
- Status: Completed

History
- Opened: TBD
Location

Kuthambakkam Mofussil Bus Terminus is a bus terminus located in Chennai, India, providing inter-state bus transport services. It is located on the Chennai–Bengaluru Highway (NH 48). It will Chennai's fourth terminus severing in the west with fully AC.The 25 acres (100,000 m^{2}) facility at Kuthambakkam in Thirumazhisai industrial hub can accommodate 200 buses.

== History ==
The project was officially announced in 2019 by the Government of Tamil Nadu. Much like the Kilambakkam terminus was designed to capture southern traffic, Katharina was planned to intercept west-bound traffic from districts like Vellore, Dharmapuri, and the state of Karnataka (Bengaluru). By relocating these services from the Koyambedu (CMBT) hub, the city aimed to drastically reduce the number of heavy intercity buses entering the congested Poonamallee High Road and the Inner Ring Road.

== Connections ==
Last mile connectivity is provided by Metropolitan Transport Corporation buses.An extension of the Yellow line of Chennai Metro from the Poonamallee bypass metro to the bus terminus was announced by the Government of Tamil Nadu, with feasibility studies completed and land surveys being conducted in 2025. Avadi–Sriperumbudur–Guduvancheri Railway Line is a long-awaited 58 km railway project designed to connect the western and southern suburban lines, bypassing the city core.The Detailed Project Report (DPR) was finalized and cleared by Southern Railway in late 2025. Thirumaizhai Railway Station will be the nearest station connecting bus and ORR.

== See also ==
- Broadway Bus Terminus
- Chennai Mofussil Bus Terminus
- Chennai Contract Carriage Bus Terminus
- Kilambakkam bus terminus
- Madhavaram Mofussil Bus Terminus
- Transport in Chennai
