= Madhavaram Mofussil Bus Terminus =

Satellite bus terminus of Chennai, India

Madhavaram Mofussil Bus Terminus Mātavaram Puṟanakar Pēruntu Muṉaiyam
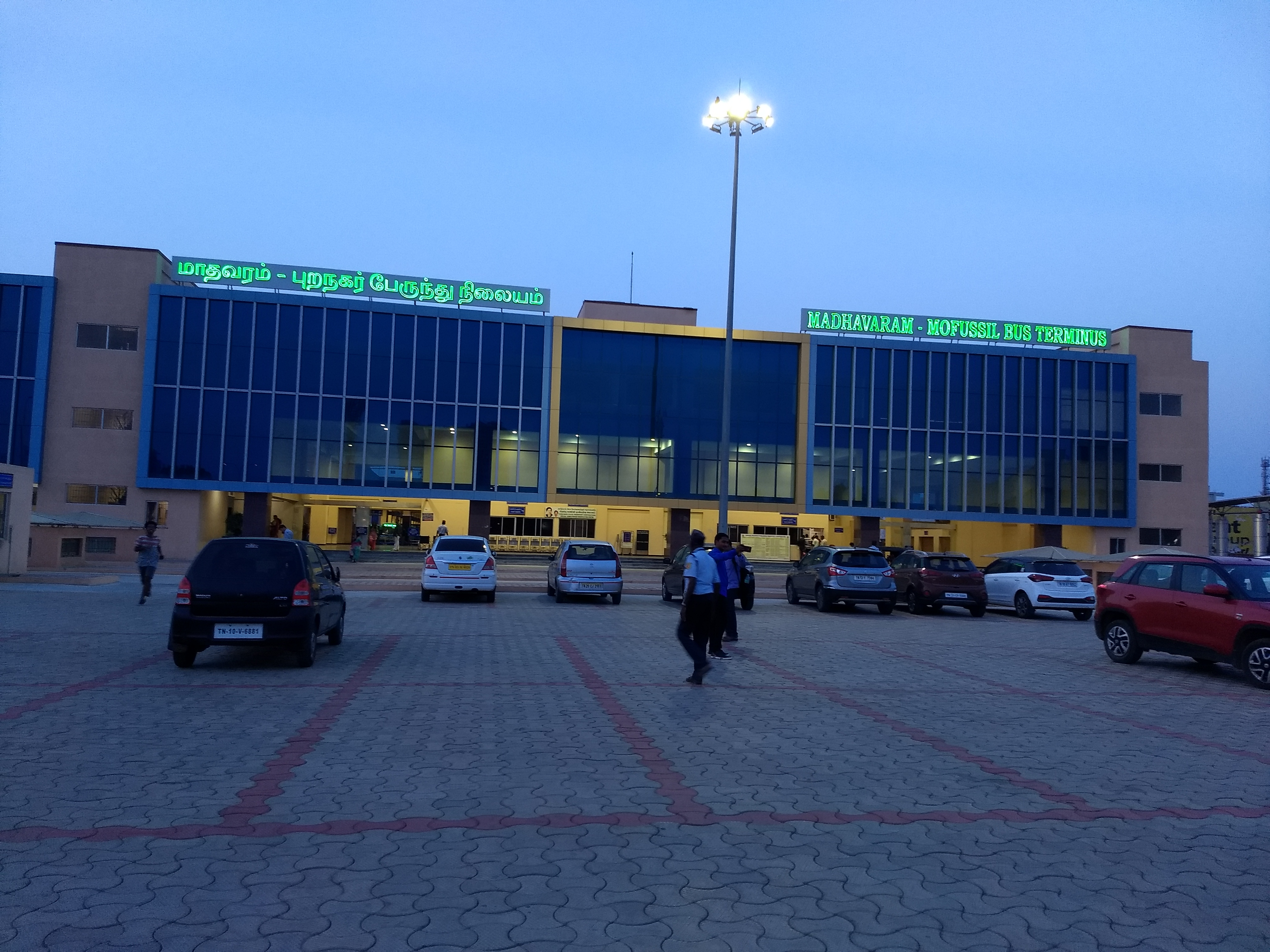
- Facade of Madhavaram Mofussil Bus Terminus

General information
- Other names: Madhavaram Bus Stand, Madhavaram Bus Terminus
- Location: J Garden, Inner Ring Road, Madhavaram, Chennai - 600060; Tamil Nadu; India
- System: TNSTC, SETC, APSRTC, TSRTC and MTC Bus Terminus
- Owner: CMDA
- Operator: CMDA
- Platforms: 92
- Bus routes: Andhra Pradesh; Telangana; Chennai Metropolitan Area
- Bus operators: Tamil Nadu State Transport Corporation; State Express Transport Corporation (Tamil Nadu); Andhra Pradesh State Road Transport Corporation; Telangana State Road Transport Corporation; Metropolitan Transport Corporation (Chennai)
- Connections: Red Line Madhavaram Bus Terminus

Construction
- Structure type: At-grade
- Platform levels: 2
- Parking: Yes
- Accessible: yes

History
- Opened: 2018
Location

Madhavaram Mofussil Bus Terminus is a bus terminus in Chennai, India, located in the neighbourhood of Madhavaram, providing outstation/inter-state transport services. Spread over an area of 8 acres (32,000 m^{2}), it was built to decongest the Chennai Mofussil Bus Terminus in Koyambedu. It will chiefly handle buses to Andhra Pradesh and Telangana, including cities such as Chittoor, Tirupati, Nellore, Vijayawada, Kurnool, Puttaparthi, Visakhapatnam, Bhadrachalam, and Hyderabad. As of 2018, the number of passengers travelling from Chennai to these two states daily average 12,500. The Tamil Nadu and Andhra governments operate about 315 services daily, with the number increasing during weekends.

== History ==
The terminus was built in 2018 at a cost of ₹ 950 million by BNR Infrastructure Projects, Chennai. It was inaugurated on 10 October 2018 by the Tamil Nadu Chief Minister Edappadi K. Palaniswami. The MTC runs 77 trips every day.

== The terminus ==
The terminus covers an area of 8 acres (32,000 m^{2}) and is built in two levels adjacent to the Madhavaram Truck Terminal. The level at grade can accommodate 42 buses and the upper level can accommodate 50 buses. There are nine slots meant for city buses. The parking space can hold 1,700 two-wheelers and 72 cars.

There are six staircases, three elevators, two ATM counters, two ticket counters, and an information office in the terminus. It additionally has provisions for eight shops, a restaurant, an infant-feeding room, a family waiting hall, crew rest room, health clinic, pharmacy and a dormitory.

The terminus is served by a 40,000-litre overhead tank, a 500,000-litre underground sump for water, and a 200,000-litre sewage treatment plant. The premises is lit by five high-mast lights.

The terminus constructed in the land which earlier is a part of Madhavaram Truck Terminal which is also owned by the CMDA.

== See also ==
- Broadway Bus Terminus
- Chennai Egmore Railway Station
- Chennai Contract Carriage Bus Terminus
- Puratchi Thalaivar Dr. M.G.R. Bus Terminus
- Puratchi Thalaivar Dr. M.G. Ramachandran Central Railway Station
- Kalaignar Centenary Bus Terminus
- Kuthambakkam Mofussil Bus Terminus
- Tambaram railway station
- Transport in Chennai
