= Mangala (disambiguation) =

Mangala is the name for Mars in Hindu astrology.

Mangala may also refer to:

- Mangala (game), a traditional Turkish mancala game
- Alemungula, an African mancala game, also known as Mangala
- Mangala (magazine), a weekly Kannada film magazine
- Mangala (film), a Hindi-Telugu bilingual film
- Mangala language (disambiguation)
- Mangala people, an Indigenous Australian people of Western Australia
- Mangala, a Hindu deity; see Maa Mangala Temple, Kakatpur, India
- Mangala Area, major oil field in the Indian state of Rajasthan
- Mangala Dosha, Hindu superstition
- Maṅgala Buddha
- Maṅgala Sutta

== People ==
- Eliaquim Mangala (born 1991), French footballer
- Mangala Moonesinghe (1931–2016), Sri Lankan lawyer, politician, and diplomat
- Mangala Narlikar (1943–2023), Indian mathematician
- Mangala Samaraweera (born 1956), Sri Lankan politician
- Orel Mangala (born 1998), Belgian footballer

== See also ==
- Mangalam (disambiguation)
- Mangal (disambiguation)
- Mongkol (disambiguation), Thai transliteration of mangala
- Mangalla, an alternative spelling of the South Sudan community Mongalla
