= Mongkol =

Mongkol (Khmer: មង្គល, Thai: มงคล, meaning auspicious, from Sanskrit: maṅgala) may refer to:

- Mongkol (name)
- Mongkol Borei District, a district of Banteay Meanchey Province in north eastern Cambodia
- Mongkol Borei River, a river that flows through the district to the Tonle Sap
- Mongkol Borei (town), the capital of Mongkol Borei District
- Robas Mongkol, a commune in north-western Cambodia

== See also ==
- Mangala (disambiguation)
- Mongkhon, different romanization of the same Thai term, referring to a talismanic headgear used in Muay Thai
