= Chennai Mofussil Bus Terminus =

Bus station in Chennai, India

Chennai Mofussil Bus Terminus Puratchi Thalaivar Dr. M.G.R. Bus Terminus Ceṉṉai Puṟanakar Pēruntu Muṉaiyam Puraṭcit Talaivar Ṭākṭar Em.Ji.Ār. Pēruntu Muṉaiyam
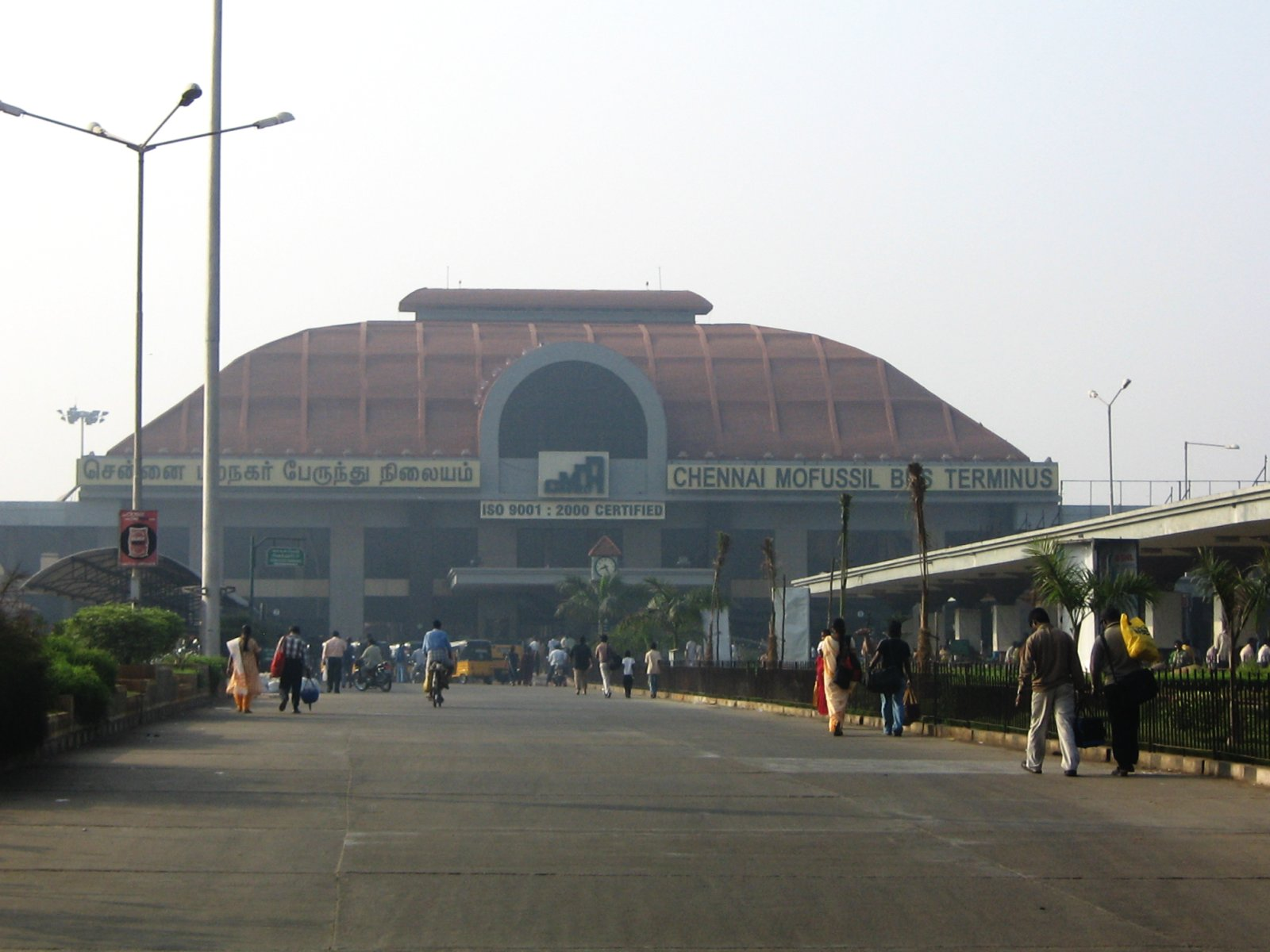
- Facade of CMBT

General information
- Other names: Koyembedu Bus Stand
- Location: Koyambedu, Chennai; Tamil Nadu; India
- Coordinates: 13.06745°N 80.20566°E
- System: Bus Terminus
- Owner: CMDA
- Operator: CMDA
- Platforms: 160
- Bus routes: Tamil Nadu; Karnataka; Kerala; Puducherry; Chennai Metropolitan Area
- Bus operators: TNSTC, SETC, KSRTC, NWKRTC, KKRTC, PTC, MTC
- Connections: Green Line CMBT

Construction
- Structure type: At-grade
- Parking: Yes
- Cycle facilities: Yes
- Accessible: yes

History
- Opened: 2002
Location

Chennai Mofussil Bus Terminus, officially Puratchi Thalaivar Dr. M.G.R. Bus Terminus, is a bus terminus located in Chennai, India, providing inter-state bus transport services. It is located on the Inner Ring Road in Koyambedu and is one of the largest bus terminus by area in India.

== History ==
In the 1990s, inter-city buses from Chennai were operated from Broadway bus terminus in George Town and from few other locations such as Saidapet. As a part of the first master plan for the development of the city, a new bus terminus was planned on the Inner Ring Road in Koyambedu between the South Asian Games village and the vegetable market. Construction of the new Chennai mofussil bus terminus started on 6 June 1999 and it was inaugurated on 18 November 2002 for public use by J. Jayalalithaa, then chief minister of Tamil Nadu. On 9 October 2018, the Government of Tamil Nadu renamed the bus terminus as Puratchi Thalaivar Dr. M.G.R. Bus Terminus in honour of former chief minister M. G. Ramachandran.

== Infrastructure and operations ==
It is spread over an area of 36 acres (150,000 m^{2}) with a built-up area of 17,840 ft^{2} (1,657 m^{2}). The terminus is operated by Chennai Metropolitan Development Authority and has six platforms with 180 bus bays. In 2005, the terminus was accredited with the ISO 9001:2000 quality certification for its quality management. It has a parking area for 60 buses and can accommodate 270 buses at any given time. It has a 25,000 ft^{2} (2,300 m^{2}) open parking space for auto rickshaws, taxis and private cars, and 16,000 sq ft (1,500 m^{2}) parking space for two-wheeler. Additional underground parking lots were added in 2010 and 2013. Other facilities and amenities include restaurants, locker rooms, travel offices, shops, supermarkets, ATMs, dorimtories, toilets, drinking water dispensers, emergency care centre, pharmacies, Wi-Fi, and access facilities for the disabled.

== Connections ==
Chennai Metro Rail has an elevated Metro railway station adjacent to the bus terminus, which forms part of the Green Line.

== See also ==
- Broadway Bus Terminus
- Chennai Contract Carriage Bus Terminus
- Kilambakkam bus terminus
- Kuthambakkam Mofussil Bus Terminus
- Madhavaram Mofussil Bus Terminus
- Transport in Chennai
