= Thirumangalam =

Thirumangalam may refer to these places in India:

- Thirumangalam, Chennai, a neighbourhood of Chennai, Tamil Nadu, India
  - Thirumangalam metro station
- Tirumangalam, Madurai, a municipality in Madurai district, Tamil Nadu, India
  - Thirumangalam taluk, a subdistrict of Madurai district containing the municipality
    - Thirumangalam Assembly constituency, an electoral constituency of the Tamil Nadu Legislative Assembly
    - Thirumangalam block, a revenue block
- Thirumangalam, Tiruchirappalli district, a village in Tiruchirappalli district, Tamil Nadu, India
- Thirumangalam Sree Maha Vishnu Siva Temple, a Hindu temple in Thrissur district, Kerala, India

== See also ==
- Mangalam (disambiguation)
- Thiru (disambiguation)
