= Mangal (disambiguation) =

Mangal is an Asian given name and surname.

Mangal may also refer to:

- Mangal State, a former Hindu princely state in Himachal Pradesh, northern India
- Mangal (Pashtun tribe), a tribe originating in the Afghan provinces Paktia and Khost
- Mangal (barbecue), Turkish-style barbecue and its typical cooking equipment
- Mangal (typeface), a font for the Devanagari script, used for some Indian languages
- Magal (song), or mangal, a folk song tradition of Nepal
- A Mangrove swamp, a wet environment dominated by that saline woody tree and shrub

== See also ==
Arts

- Mangal-Kāvya, a collection of Bengali religious poetry
- Annada Mangal or Nutan Mangal, a Bengali narrative poem
- Mangal Pandey: The Rising, an Indian biographic film about Mangal Pandey

Place

- Lazha Mangal District, a district in Paktia Province, Afghanistan

Other

- Mangal Dosha, an astrological combination
- Mangala (disambiguation)
