= Chennai Contract Carriage Bus Terminus =

Bus terminus in Chennai, Tamil Nadu, India

Coordinates: 13.07078°N 80.19866°E

Chennai Contract Carriage Bus Terminus Ceṉṉai Oppanta Vaṇṭi Pēruntu Muṉaiyam

General information
- Other names: Chennai Omni Bus Terminus (CMBT), Koyembedu Omni Bus Stand
- Location: Koyambedu Market East Road, Koyambedu, Chennai 600107; Tamil Nadu; India
- System: Contract Carriage Bus Terminus
- Owner: CMDA
- Platforms: 62
- Bus routes: Tamil Nadu; Karnataka; Kerala; Andhra Pradesh; Telangana; Goa; Puducherry
- Bus operators: 150+ Contract Carriage bus operators
- Connections: Chennai Metro, MTC

Construction
- Structure type: At-grade
- Parking: Yes
- Cycle facilities: Yes
- Accessible: yes

History
- Opened: August 2003

Passengers
- 10,000 passengers/day
Location

Chennai Contract Carriage Bus Terminus is a bus terminus located in Chennai, in close proximity to Puratchi Thalaivar Dr. M.G.R. Bus Terminus. It caters to intercity contract carriage privately run buse services. It was inaugurated in August 2003.

The CCCBT, spread over an area of 6.7 acres, has 68 bus bays, 126 idle parking, 51 travel agency office, 22 shops, and 14 passenger waiting halls with total seating facilities for about 120 persons. It is being maintained by CMDA. The CCCBT caters to about 5,000 passengers daily. Every day about 350 buses, about 450 on peak days, are operated to all parts of the state and to Kerala, Karnataka and Andhra Pradesh.

== Development ==
In 2010, a modernisation project aimed at decongesting the bus terminus was proposed by the Chennai Metropolitan Development Authority, under which 250 bus bays will be constructed. The ₹ 2,190-million proposal also included a three-level bus bay, including a basement floor, with 81,749 sq m commercial space, an idle parking of 150 buses in the basement, 75 operational bays on the ground floor, and 25 bays on the first floor.

Upon completion, the terminus will have 14,417 sq m of terminal area, 16,598 sq m of idle parking area, 4,010 sq m of driveways, 28,606 sq m of commercial office space, 9,548 sq m of retail space, and 8,570 sq m of hotel space.

== See also ==
- Broadway Bus Terminus
- Chennai Egmore Railway Station
- Madhavaram Mofussil Bus Terminus
- Puratchi Thalaivar Dr. M.G.R. Bus Terminus
- Puratchi Thalaivar Dr. M.G. Ramachandran Central Railway Station
- Kalaignar Centenary Bus Terminus
- Tambaram railway station
- Transport in Chennai
