= Anna Nagar West =

- neighbourhood
- Location within Chennai Location within Tamil Nadu Location within India
- Coordinates: 13.093500°N 80.1985°E
- Country: India
- State: Tamil Nadu
- District: Chennai District
- Metro: Chennai

Government
  - Body: Greater Chennai Corporation

Languages
  - Official: Tamil
- Time zone: UTC+5:30 (IST)
- PIN: 600040
- Vehicle registration: TN-02
- Vidhan Sabha constituency: Villivakkam
- Lok Sabha constituency: Central Chennai
- Planning agency: CMDA
- Civic agency: Greater Chennai Corporation
- Website: www.chennai.tn.nic.in

Anna Nagar West is a township in Chennai, India. It is the western part of Anna Nagar and is one of the most socially active locations in Chennai. The area serves as a major transport and residential hub within the city. It is also connected by the contemporary metro rail system. The region contains several schools and hospitals. It is mostly a public service concentrated hub located in a residential area. Millennium Park is the largest park within the region. It has a bus terminus belonging to the Metropolitan Transport Corporation.

== History ==
Anna Nagar West began as a suburban village in connection with the urban development of Anna Nagar near Chennai at the time of the 1968 World Trade Fair. The village was planned with residential plots, apartments, commercial complexes, wide roads, school zones, a bus terminus and large parks. Anna Nagar West's boundaries are Park Road, Anna Nagar Sixth Avenue, Inner Ring Road, Ambattur Main Road and M.T.H. Road. The locality witnessed enormous growth during the 1990s and 2000s and is now home to many politicians, bureaucrats and industrialists. It is considered as a prime residential location in Chennai.

== Transportation ==
=== Road ===
The roads of Anna Nagar West are laid in a grid pattern.

Anna Nagar West bus terminus is situated on the Inner Ring Road. It is one of the largest bus terminals in Chennai and was built by the Pallavan Transport Corporation (PTC) in 1973. As it fell in the Aynavaram Metropolitan Transport Corporation (Chennai) region, its code was "ANW", then "ANI" and "ANJ" and then "ANK". The terminus houses about 232 buses of which 213 are used daily. About 50,000 people use this terminus daily. it is the hub for the Mogappair, CMBT, and MMDA bus terminals.

=== Railway ===
The Anna Nagar railway station was inaugurated in 2003. It is located on the road to Villivakkam. A 3.09 kilometres (1.92 mi) railway line links Anna Nagar with the Tiruvallur-Chennai suburban line. The nearest Chennai Metro station to Anna Nagar West is the Thirumangalam metro station.

Between 2003 and 2007, five suburban trains ran from Anna Nagar to Chennai Beach via Villivakkam. The station was closed in 2007 for the construction of the Padi Junction (an elevated roundabout or rotary). However, after the completion of the junction in 2009, the station remained closed due to low patronage.

== Schools ==
- SBOA Matriculation and Higher Secondary School
- SBOA Tiny Tyros Pre School
- Guild of Service
- CSI Ewart Matriculation and Higher Secondary School
- Kutties
- British School
- Leo Matriculation and Higher Secondary School
- Shri Krishnaswamy Matriculation Higher Secondary School
- Vidvattva International School
- Mary Clubwala Jadhav Special High School
- Ajay Higher Secondary School for the hearing impaired
- The Schram Academy
- Chinmaya Vidyalaya
- Kendriya Vidyalaya
- Vruksha International School of Montessori
- B's Creche & Play School

== Hospitals ==
- Madras Naturopathy & Siddha Hospital
- Be Well Hospitals
- Silkee Laser Research Institute
- Scarf Hospital
- KKR ENT Hospital
- I. K. Hospitals
- Shivas Eye Care
- Heritage Ayurveda Clinic
- Christian Maternity Home Clinic
- Excel Polyclinic
- Barking Fine Pet Clinic
