= Kilambakkam bus terminus, Chennai =

Express bus terminus in Chennai, India

Kilambakkam Bus Terminus Kalaignar Centenary Bus Terminus
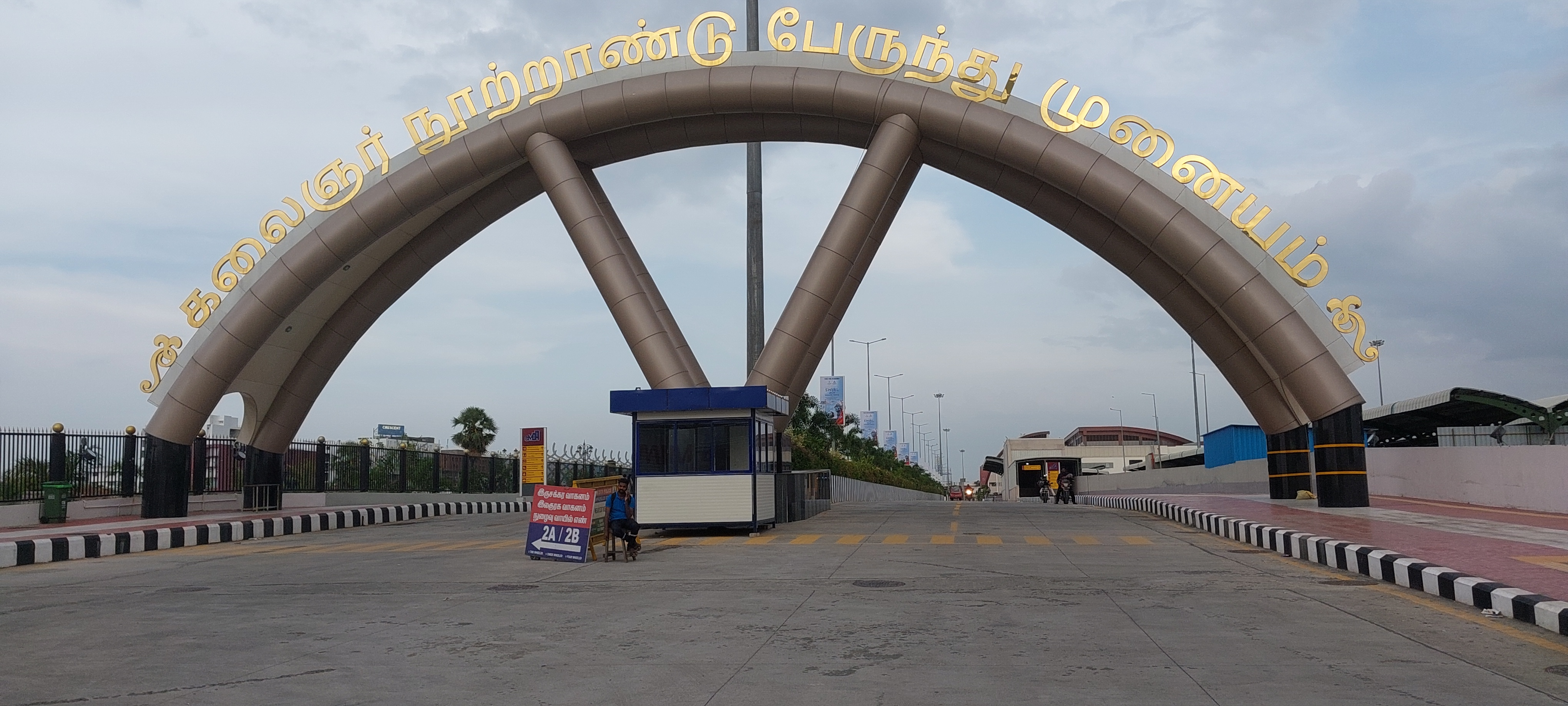
- One of the gates of the bus terminus

General information
- Other names: KCBT
- Location: Grand Southern Trunk Road, Kilambakkam, Chennai; Tamil Nadu; India
- Coordinates: 12.8727°N 80.0819°E
- System: Bus terminus
- Owner: CMDA
- Platforms: 215
- Bus routes: Tamil Nadu; Puducherry; Kerala
- Bus operators: TNSTC; SETC; MTC; KSRTC; KSRTC SWIFT; Contract Carriage

Construction
- Structure type: At-grade
- Parking: Yes
- Cycle facilities: Yes
- Accessible: yes

History
- Opened: 30 December 2023
Location

Kilambakkam Bus Terminus, officially Kalaignar Centenary Bus Terminus, is a bus terminus in Kilambakkam, a southern suburb of Chennai, India. Spread over an area of 88.52 acres (358,200 m^{2}), it is situated along the GST Road. It was built to decongest the Chennai Mofussil Bus Terminus at Koyambedu, and was opened to public on 30 December 2023. It is an integrated bus terminus for mofussil buses operated by government transport corporations and contract carriages. The terminus is connected to other parts of the Chennai Metropolitan Area and suburbs by MTC buses.

== History ==
In 2016, Government of Tamil Nadu planned to construct a new bus terminus at Kilambakkam near Vandalur in South Chennai as a part of a plan to de-congest the existing bus terminus at Koyambedu. The area earmarked for the construction of the Kilambakkam Bus terminus was within a protected zone declared by Archaeological Survey of India (ASI) as it contained megalithic sites. According to the Ancient Monuments and Archaeological Sites and Remains Act (AMASR), all constructions are banned within 100 meters of ASI protected areas and any construction of a building with 200 meters of such areas requires permission from National Monument Authority (NMA). Chennai Metropolitan Development Authority (CMDA) commissioned Reach Foundation to undertake a heritage impact assessment study on the development of Kilambakkam Bus Terminus.

The works were ceased as clearance was pending from the National Monument Authority. In February 2019, clearance was given for the construction of bus terminus with specific conditions including no further development in the 100 meter prohibited area except greenery and the involvement of archaeologists at the time of excavation and mitigation measures to be taken at the time of construction if artefacts are found. The foundation stone for the project was laid on 22 February 2019 by Chief Minister of Tamil Nadu Edappadi K. Palaniswami. Kilambakkam Bus Terminus was officially named as Kalaignar Centenary Bus Terminus and inaugurated on 30 December 2023 by Chief Minister of Tamil Nadu M. K. Stalin.

== Financials ==
The project was projected to cost ₹3.25 billion (US$34 million) including ₹1.75 billion (US$18 million) for the main terminal buildings. The operational expenditure was estimated at ₹6.60 billion (US$69 million) per year with projected revenues of ₹10.20 billion (US$110 million). The projected ended up costing ₹3.94 billion (US$41 million) .

== Infrastructure ==
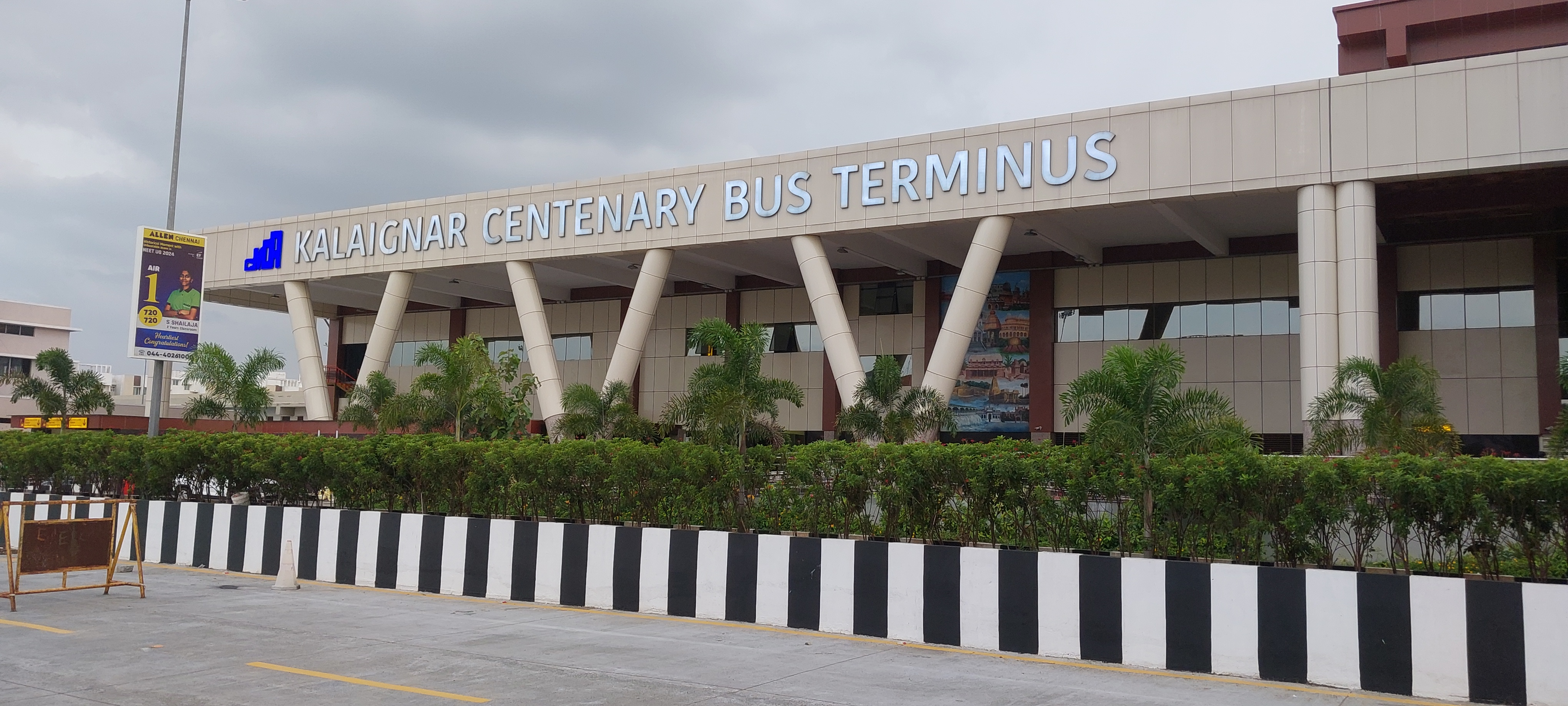
View of the main building inside the bus terminus

The bus terminus is built on a land area of 88.52 acres (35.82 ha) with a total built-up area of 640,000 ft^{2} (59,000 m^{2}). It was done on a Build-Operate-Transfer (BOT) model. The terminus consists of 215 bus bays including 130 bays for government buses and 85 bays for private contract carriages, situated across 14 platforms in 8 bus fingers. It has a 3.99 acres (1.61 ha) lay-off area for buses and a parking area that can accommodate 324 cars and 2,769 two-wheelers. The bus station is equipped with ticket counters, information centers and other essential facilities like toilets, drinking water, dormitories, feeding rooms, police station, pharmacy, fire station, ATMs. The bus station has a commercial complex which hosts restaurants and retail stores. It has been constructed to be transgender and disabled friendly.

== Connections ==
Last mile connectivity is provided by Metropolitan Transport Corporation buses. Concerns have been raised by the public regarding last mile connectivity to the bus terminus as it is located away from the city center and there is no existing suburban railway link to the station.

The bus terminus is located along the South line of the Chennai Suburban Railway. The construction of a new Kilambakkam railway station began in 2024 and the bus station will be connected to it by a skyway. An extension of the Blue Line of Chennai Metro from the Chennai International Airport to the bus terminus was announced by the Government of Tamil Nadu, with feasibility studies completed and land surveys being conducted in 2023.

== See also ==
- Broadway Bus Terminus
- Kuthambakkam Mofussil Bus Terminus
- Madhavaram Mofussil Bus Terminus
- Transport in Chennai
