= Mangalam (disambiguation) =

Mangalam may refer to:

- Mangalam River, Kerala, India
  - Mangalam Dam, a dam on the river
    - Mangalam Dam, Palakkad, a village on the dam
- Mangalam, Tirur, a village in Kerala
- Mangalam, Tiruppur, a town in Tamil Nadu
- Mangalam Assembly constituency, an electoral constituency of the Puducherry Legislative Assembly in India
- Mother Mangalam, the co-founder and life chairman of Pure Life Society
- Mangalam Publications, an Indian publishing company in Kottayam, Kerala, India
  - Mangalam Weekly, Malayalam-language weekly magazine published by Mangalam Publications
  - Mangalam TV, an Indian Malayalam-language satellite TV channel

== See also ==
- Mangala (disambiguation)
- Thirumangalam (disambiguation)
