= Thirumangalam, Chennai =

- Neighbourhood
- Thirumangalam(Chennai) Thirumangalam, Chennai (Tamil Nadu) Thirumangalam, Chennai (India)
- Coordinates: 13.08541°N 80.19865°E
- Country: India
- State: Tamil Nadu
- District: Chennai
- Metro: Chennai

Government
  - Body: CMDA

Languages
  - Official: Tamil
- Time zone: UTC+5:30 (IST)
- PIN: 600 040
- Vehicle registration: TN 02)(RTO, Chennai North West)
- Planning agency: CMDA

Thirumangalam is a neighborhood that lies on the border of Anna Nagar in Chennai. Thirumangalam is on the border of Anna Nagar and often referred as Anna Nagar. The original Thirumangalam village lies on the boundary of Anna Nagar and Anna Nagar West. The old Thirumaniamman Temple is situated here.

== Schools ==
Kendriya Vidyalaya is in Anna Nagar.

== Malls ==
Large shopping malls in the area are VR Mall, Anna Nagar Super Market and Santhosh Stores

== Temples ==
The Arulmigu Thirumangaleshwarar Thirukoil is located near VR mall, and is open to tourists.

== Transportation ==
A planned extension to the Chennai Metro Rail will pass through a tower.
