= Mongkol (name) =

Mongkol (Thai: มงคล, RTGS: Mongkhon, pronounced [mōŋ.kʰōn]; meaning 'auspicious'; from Pali/Sanskrit maṅgala) is a Thai masculine given name. Notable people with the name include:

- Mongkol Aimmanolrom, Thai basketball player
- Mongkol Na Songkhla (1941–2020), Thai politician
- Mongkol Namnuad (born 1985), Thai football player
- Mongkol Tossakrai (born 1987), Thai football player
- Mongkhon Wiwasuk, Muay Thai boxer known professionally as Malaipet Sasiprapa

== See also ==
- Mongkhon
