= Mangala language =

Mangala may be:

- Mangarla language (Australia)
- Mangala language (Bantu)
