= Broadway bus terminus =

Bus terminus in Chennai

Coordinates: 13.0874°N 80.2838°E

Broadway Bus Terminus Pirāṭvē Pēruntu Muṉaiyam

General information
- Other names: Broadway Bus Stand
- Location: Netaji Subhash Chandra Bose Road, Esplanade, George Town, Chennai 600001; Tamil Nadu; India
- System: MTC Bus Terminus
- Owner: CMDA
- Platforms: 30
- Bus routes: Chennai Metropolitan Area
- Bus operators: Metropolitan Transport Corporation (Chennai)
- Connections: Blue Line High Court; Chennai Fort

Construction
- Structure type: At-grade
- Parking: Yes
- Cycle facilities: Yes
- Accessible: yes

History
- Former names: Chennai Bus Terminus

Passengers
- 1,50,000 passengers/day
Location

Broadway Bus Terminus is the largest city bus terminus of the Metropolitan Transport Corporation (Chennai), Chennai, Tamil Nadu, India. It is located in the downtown area of the city, namely, Parry's corner and Chennai Fort. It lies opposite the Madras High Court along the Esplanade in George Town. It is a connecting point to several areas in the city. The bus terminus is located at the southern end of Broadway and is near the Chennai Fort suburban railway station.

== Developments ==
In 2019, the city corporation planned to construct a 21-storey multi-modal hub covering 1 million square feet, integrating the Chennai Metro. It will have a parking space for 1904 cars and 1820 motorcycles. The bus terminus will be developed with 97 bays across two floors: 53 on the lower level and 44 on the upper level. It will have a leasable area of 92,800 square meter, allowing commercial and retail on all the floors. Infrastructure includes an interchange hub for intra-city buses, metro, MRTS and para-transit modes of transport. The corporation expects an occupancy rate of 95 percent.

== Multi-level car parking ==
A multi-level car parking is proposed to be constructed at an area of 30,000 sq m for a total of 5,000 cars and 7,900 two-wheelers.

== Connectivity and Locality details ==
The bus terminus is very close to Chennai Central railway station. The nearest suburban railway station is Chennai Fort. The bus terminus is divided into two parts: the eastern and western sides. In the eastern side, only a few buses are operated. The routes covered are mainly Anna Salai, LIC, D.M.S., Saidapet, Guindy, Tambaram, etc. Until 2002, mofussil bus services were operated from the eastern part. From the western part, buses are operated to all other routes not operated in the eastern part. Broadway is the place where large trade activities, both wholes sale and retail, flourish. All items starting from civil, housewares, plastics, general provisions, stationery, fruits, flowers, cycles, etc. are available here. State government-owned Kuralagam an multidepartmental shop is near to the bus stand.

It also have an Entry/Exit Point of High Court Metro station of Chennai Metro inside the Terminal

Broadway Bus Terminus also provides bus services to sub urban areas like Avadi, Kalaignar Centenary Bus Terminus, Kilambakkam, Poonamallee High Road, Thiruporur, Mogappair and various other localities.

The terminus is patronised by about 150,000 people every day. However, it is criticized for improper maintenance, resulting in unhygienic environment.

== See also ==
- Chennai Egmore Railway Station
- Chennai Contract Carriage Bus Terminus
- Madhavaram Mofussil Bus Terminus
- Puratchi Thalaivar Dr. M.G.R. Bus Terminus
- Puratchi Thalaivar Dr. M.G. Ramachandran Central Railway Station
- Kalaignar Centenary Bus Terminus
- Tambaram railway station
- Transport in Chennai
