= Mangala Dosha =

Superstition prevalent in India

Mangala Dosha (IAST: Maṅgala-doṣa), also known as Mangal Dosh because of schwa deletion, is a Hindu superstition, prevalent in India. A person born under the influence of Mars (Mangala) as per Hindu astrology is said to have "mangala dosha" ("mars defect"); such a person is called a Mangalika (or Manglik). According to the superstition, the marriage between a Manglik and a non-Manglik is disastrous.

People who believe in this superstition think that a Manglik person will cause their non-manglik spouse's early death. To prevent this disaster, the person may be married to a tree (such as banana or peepal), an animal, or an inanimate object. This mock marriage custom has different names depending on the "spouse" used in the ceremony; for example, if the person is married to a clay pot (kumbha), the ceremony is called "kumbh-vivah" ("wedding with a pot"). It is believed that all the evil effects resulting from the Mangala Dosha befall on the mock "spouse": the person is thus freed from the consequences of being a Mangalik, and their subsequent marriage to a human is expected to be a happy one.
