= Metropolitan Transport Corporation (Chennai) =

Public transport in Chennai

Metropolitan Transport Corporation (Chennai) Ltd. Mānakara Pōkkuvarattu Kaḻakam (Ceṉṉai)
- Formerly: Pallavan Transport Corporation; Dr. Ambedkar Transport Corporation
- Parent: Tamil Nadu State Transport Corporation Ltd.
- Headquarters: Pallavan House, Anna Salai, Chennai, Tamil Nadu
- Locale: Chennai, Tamil Nadu
- Service area: Chennai Metropolitan Area
- Service type: Ordinary, Express, Deluxe, Air Conditioned Deluxe, Premium AC and Small Bus
- Daily ridership: 5.902 million per day (2023-24)
- Operator: Government of Tamil Nadu
- Website: https://mtcbus.tn.gov.in

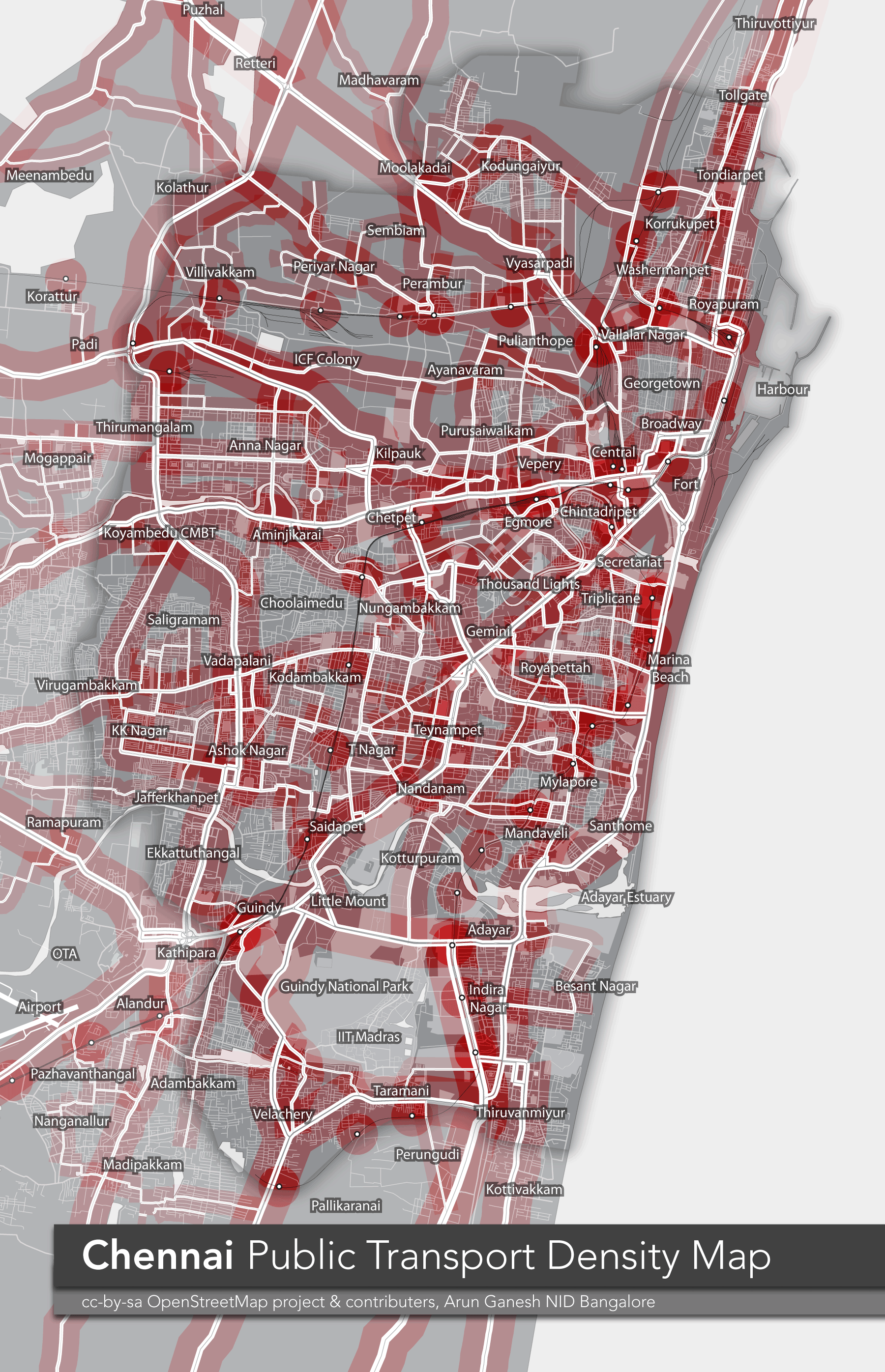
Heatmap of the coverage of public transportation in Chennai City

The Metropolitan Transport Corporation (Chennai) Ltd. (MTC), is the agency that operates the public bus service in Chennai, India. It is a subsidiary of Tamil Nadu State Transport Corporation Ltd. As of August 2024 the MTC had a total fleet of 3,376 buses with 3,233 scheduled services, with on average 5.092 Million passengers on an average per day. On March 22, 2016, the Union Ministry of Road Transport and Highways reported that Chennai had the most crowded buses in the country with 1300 passengers per bus in each direction per day. During peak hours, on some routes, a bus with a capacity to accommodate 80 persons carries twice the number of people due to the extensiveness of the system. It has an operating area of 3,929 square kilometres (1,517 sq mi). MTC has a total of 668 routes with its largest terminus being Broadway in Central Chennai.

== History ==
=== Pallavan Transport Corporation & Dr. Ambedkar Transport Corporation ===
The Pallavan Transport Corporation Ltd was established on 1 January 1972 with a fleet strength of 1,029 buses. The operational jurisdiction is the Chennai Metropolitan area. It served 176 routes and had 8 depots, including those at T. Nagar, Adyar, and Vadapalani. Depots at Anna Nagar and K.K. Nagar were established in 1973. The Pallavan Transport Corporation was split into two and a new Corporation, namely, Dr. Ambedkar Transport Corporation Ltd. started functioning from 19 January 1994. The depots in the northern areas of the city were brought under Dr. Ambedkar Transport Corporation Ltd and the southern depots came under Pallavan Transport Corporation. Pallavan Transport Corporation was renamed as Metropolitan Transport Corporation (Madras Division - I) Limited and Dr. Ambedkar Transport Corporation was renamed as Metropolitan Transport Corporation (Madras Division - II) Ltd., on 1 July 1997. In order to make the Corporations viable, and for better administrative control, Metropolitan Transport Corporation (Madras Division II) was amalgamated with Metropolitan Transport Corporation (Madras Division I) Ltd on 10 January 2001.

=== Present Day ===
As of 2012, the corporation operates 42,961 services daily in 800 routes. The driver strength at MTC is 5,000 as against a required driver strength of 5,800.

In May 2017, the MTC had a scheduled fleet of 3688 buses and total fleet strength of 3968 buses.

==== 2018 Price Hike ====
On 20 January 2018, the MTC introduced a controversial rise in fares with minimum fares for ordinary buses going up from Rs 2 to Rs 5, and maximum fare going up from Rs 12 to Rs 23, the fares were also hiked for other categories of buses with the minimum fare for Express buses becoming Rs 8 and maximum becoming Rs 35 while the minimum fares of Deluxe buses were Rs 12 and maximum fares Rs 48, this was the first such price hike since 2011. This was followed with an increase in the number of deluxe buses (from 900 to 1200) which were the costliest buses. This led to a 30% fall in the number of daily passengers within 3 months. The MTC had projected a 40% rise in daily revenue from Rs 25 million to Rs 40 million but ended up receiving only Rs 28 million in daily revenue i.e. a 12% increase.

Increase Over the Years
| Year | 1972 | 2020 |
| Depots | 8 | 33 |
| Fleet | 1,029 | 4,599 |
| Scheduled Services | 892 | 5,099 |
| Route | 209 | 895 |
| Employees | 20,159 | 24,202 |
| Passenger/day | 2.2 million | 5.8 million |
| Collection/day | ₹0.4 million | ₹26.1 million |
| Occupancy ratio | NA | 71.42% |

== Fleet ==
The total size of fleet of the MTC is 3688, of which 3492 buses are operated every day on an average. MTC operates over 5000 services daily covering about 830 routes. The last time buses were added to the fleet was in January 2020.

Per RTO rules, an MTC bus could accommodate a maximum of 83 passengers, including 48 sitting and 27 standing. However, buses carry over 160 passengers in some routes, especially during peak hours, with many travelling on the footboard of the bus resulting in several accidents. According to Union Transport Ministry of India on March 22, 2016, Chennai was reported to have the most crowded buses in the country with 1300 passengers per bus per day per direction. This is due to the extensive routes the buses ply to and also the cost which is reasonably less than some of the major cities in the country. An exclusive and efficient BRTS on dedicated elevated roads is being proposed by MTC as well as the Tamil Nadu Government in order to improve the share of public transport. For a city like Chennai, ideally more than 60% of the people should be using public transport systems. However, owing to its vehicle density which is the second highest in the country, only 40% of the citizenry use public transport which is quite low.

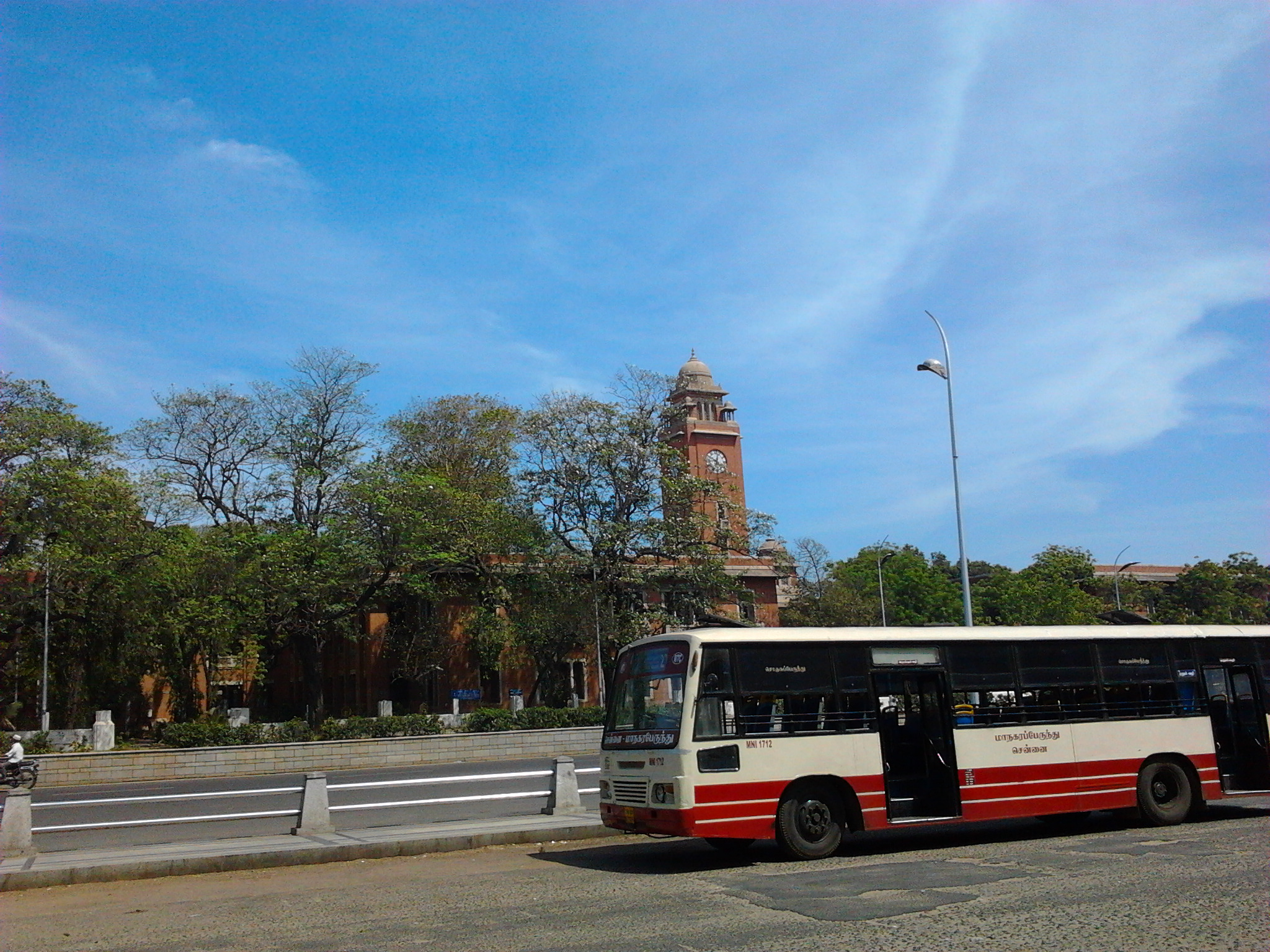
Deluxe bus from Ashok Leyland

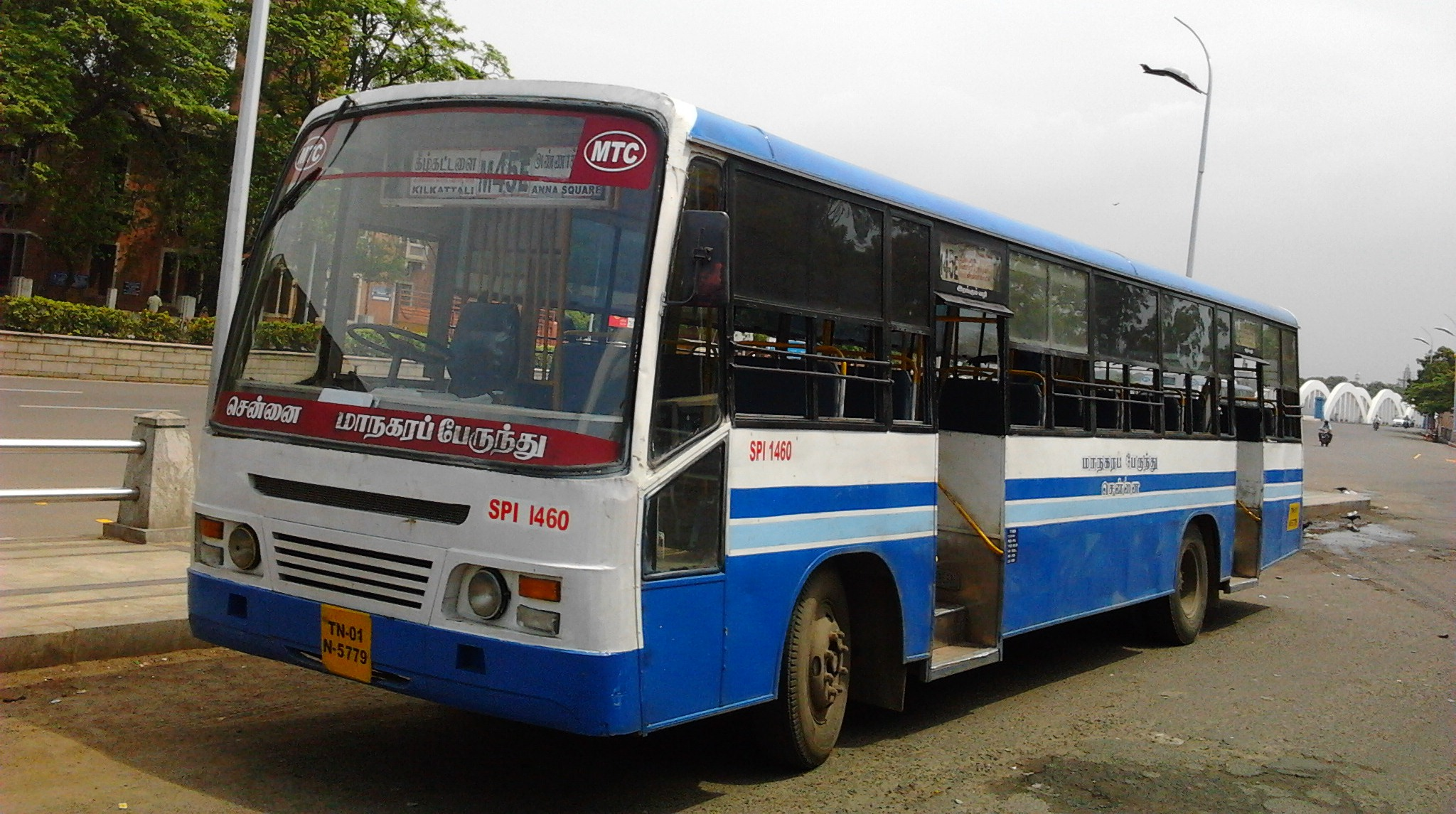
An ordinary fare (white board) bus

MTC's Tata Marcopolo Bus

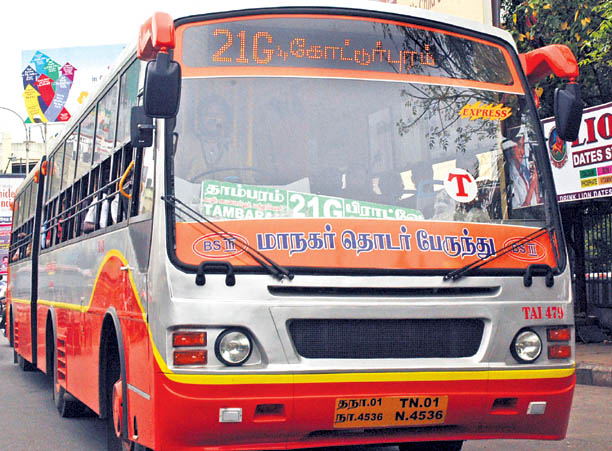
New vestibule bus with LED display

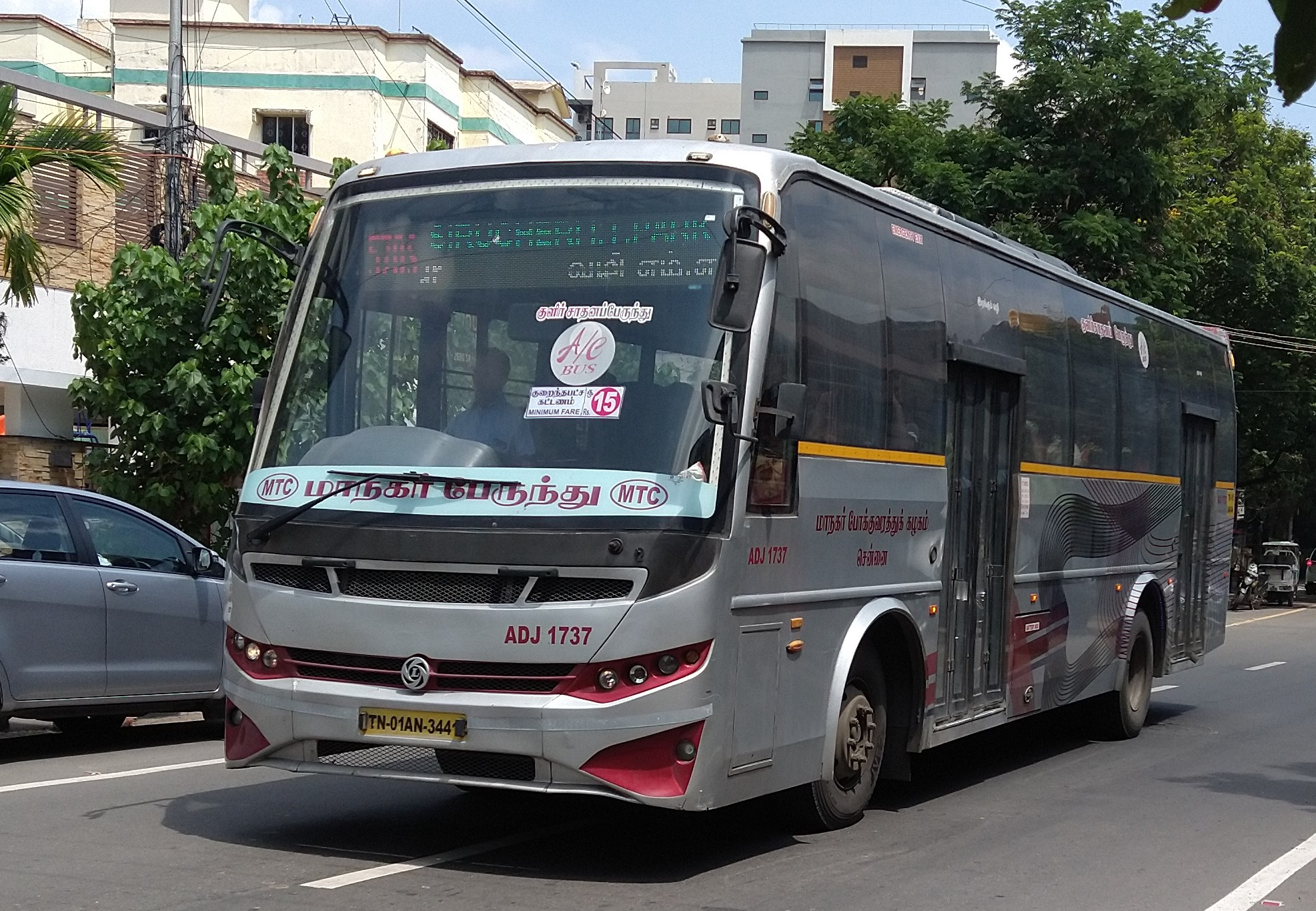
An MTC AC bus

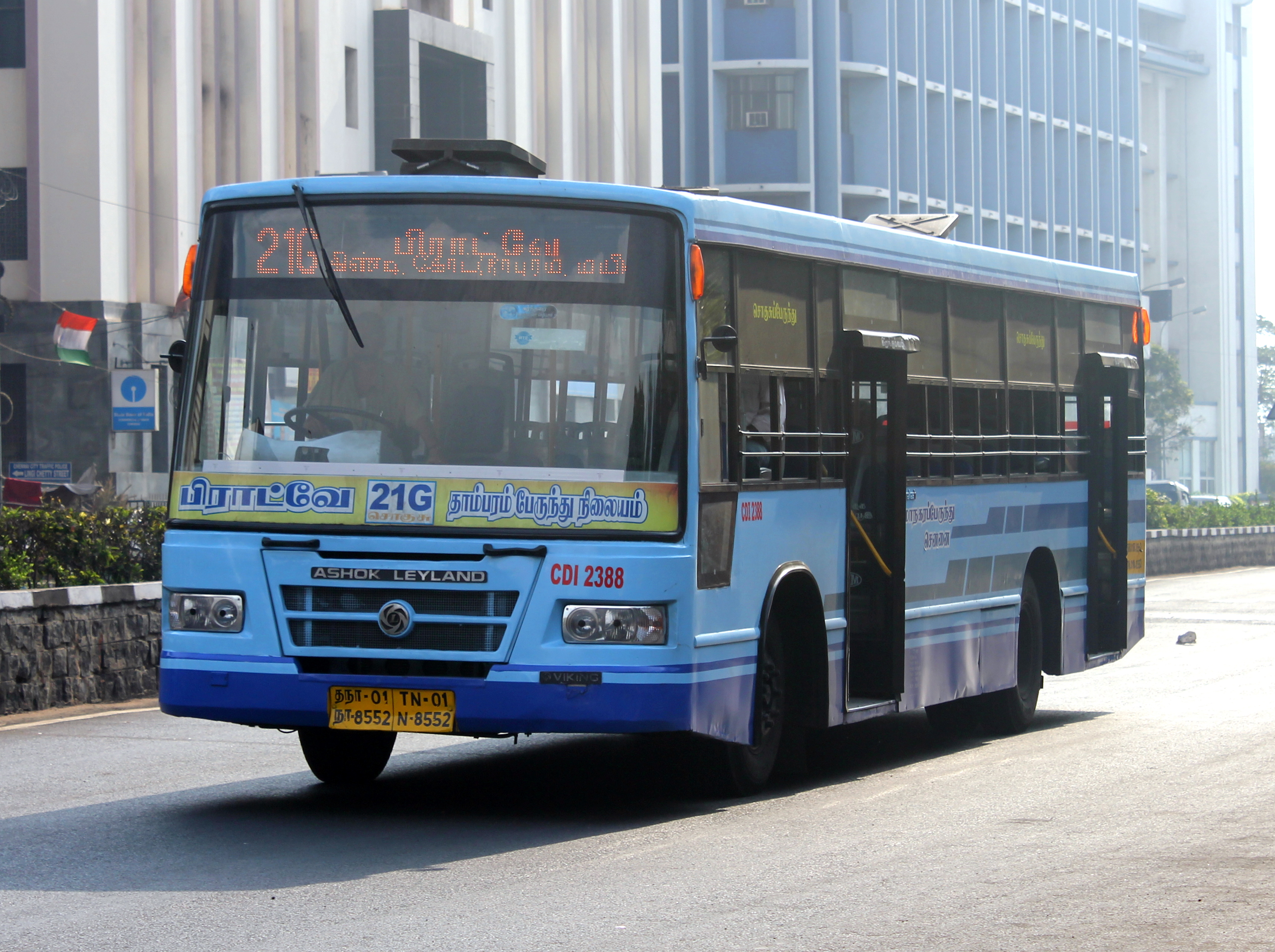
A MTC SLF plying route 21G

Normal buses These buses in the MTC fleet were manufactured by Ashok Leyland and Tata Motors. These buses were launched in the 1990s and some continue to ply while the majority have been replaced in favor of newer buses.

Semi-Low floor buses The semi-low floored and deluxe buses have improved passenger amenities like improved lighting, plastic moulded seats and driver operated pneumatic, doors into its fleet. The first set of such buses from Ashok Leyland were introduced in February 2007. The newer range of these semi-low floor buses supplied under JNNURM are BS-III compliant and have LED displays. Some continue to ply while most of them are replaced by newer buses

Vestibule services MTC also runs articulated buses provided by Ashok Leyland in congested routes. The fares are similar to those of ordinary services. These buses have 2 conductors, plastic moulded seats and LED boards. Around the end of 2017, some of these buses are condemned and no longer in service.

Air-conditioned buses MTC earlier operated low-floor Volvo B7RLE air-conditioned buses on selected routes. There were 100 of these buses running on select routes at regular intervals when they were introduced. They stopped operating in 2018 owing to poor and higher cost of maintenance, and replaced in favor of newer Ashok Leyland electric buses.

Small buses MTC has launched small-bus services to connect remote places of Chennai and its suburbs. These buses are provided by Tata.

Low-Floor busses These buses in the MTC fleet were introduced to improve accessibility for all passengers, especially the elderly and disabled. Manufactured by Ashok Leyland, they feature pneumatic doors, low entry steps, and LED route displays. Currently there are about 611 low floor busses running in Chennai. Similarly electric low-floor busses have also been procured by MTC.

MTC Fleet Over the Years
| Year | No. of buses on road | No. of buses off-road | Total |
| 2007–2008 | 2,344 | 287 | 2,631 |
| 2008–2009 | 2,792 | 370 | 3,162 |
| 2009–2010 | 2,958 | 327 | 3,285 |
| 2010–2011 | 3,007 | 355 | 3,362 |
| 2011–2012 | 3,034 | 374 | 3,408 |
| 2012–2013 | 3,027 | 356 | 3,383 |
| 2016–2017 | 3,797 | 167 | 3,964 |
| 2017–2018 | 4,091 | 182 | 4273 |
| 2018–2019 | 5,092 | 194 | 5286 |

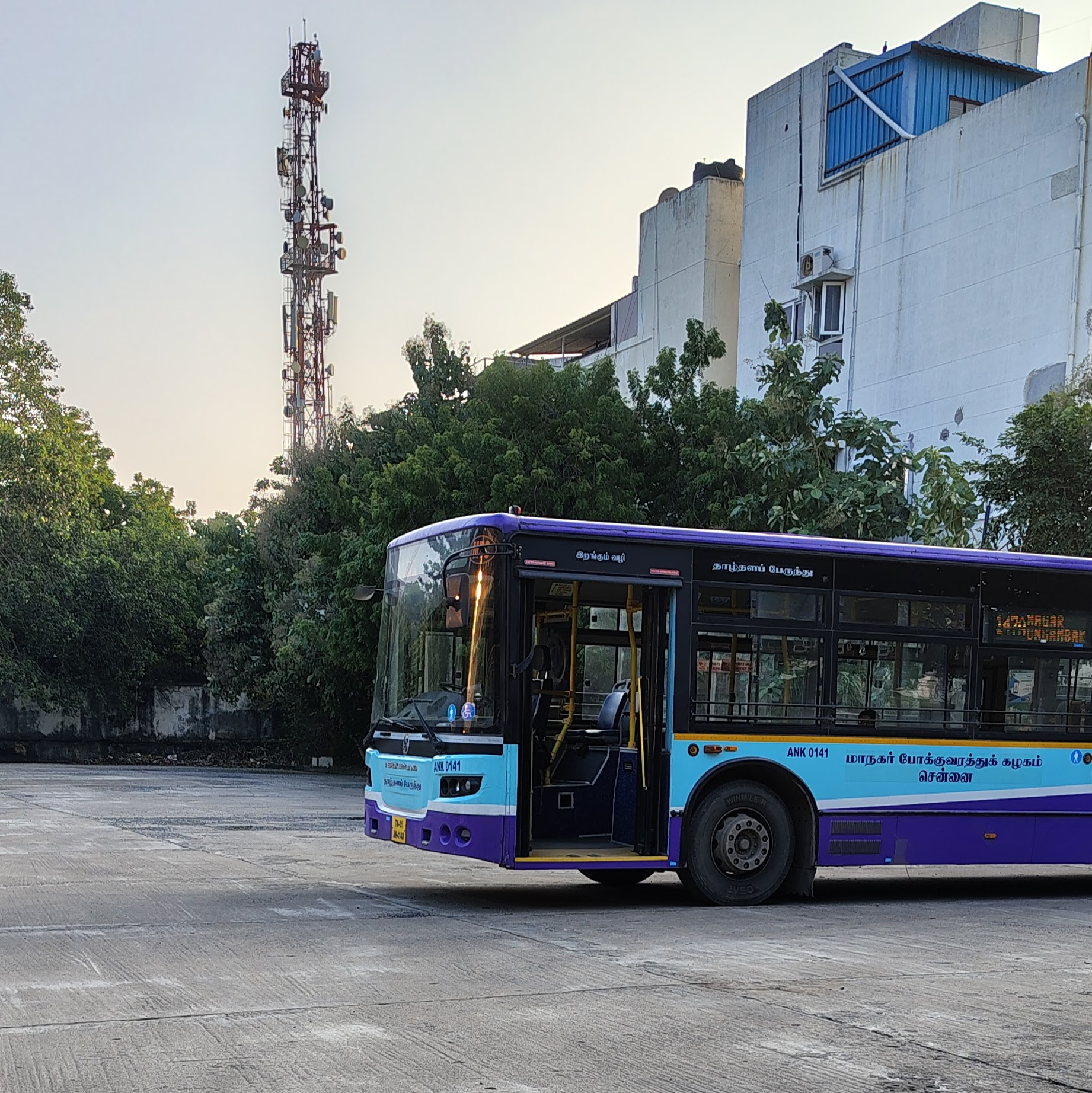
Low-Floor Bus from Ashok Leyland plying route 147A

== Services ==
- Ordinary Pink City Service: It is a non-AC bus service with 2+2 bench type non-reclining seater seats built on single-axle Ashok Leyland chassis with a brown-cream livery with front and back sides in pink. Female passengers can travel for free on these buses.
- Ordinary City Service: It is a non-AC bus service with 2+2 bench type non-reclining seater seats built on single-axle Tata chassis with a brown-cream livery.
- Mini Bus Service: It is a non-AC mini bus service with 2+2 bench type non-reclining seater seats built on single-axle Ashok Leyland chassis with a grey livery. It was launched to connect remote places, suburbs and also act as a feeder service.
- Deluxe City Service: It is a non-AC bus service with 2+2 non-reclining seater seats built on single-axle Ashok Leyland or Tata chassis with lesser stops and a red livery.
- Deluxe City AC Service: It is an AC bus service with 2+2 non-reclining seater seats built on single-axle Ashok Leyland or Tata chassis with lesser stops and a new red-grey livery.

== Depots ==
The Metropolitan Transport Corporation had 33 depots in 2020, each with an average parking capacity of 200 buses. In 2023, the new Kilambakkam depot opened as part of the Kilambakkam Bus Terminus. The Anna Nagar East and Semmencheri depots are planned for inauguration in June – July 2025. In Phase - 1, five bus depots (Vyasarpadi, Perumbakkam, Poonamallee, Central Depot and Tondiarpet - 1) are being upgraded to electric bus depots on a PPP model. The Poonamallee diesel bus depot is temporarily operating from CMBT's 5th and 6th platforms. Once Kuthambakkam Bus Terminus opens, operations will shift there. Thiruvottriyur depot is currently closed for upgrades and parallel bus terminus construction, with operations transferred to Anna Nagar East depot. In Phase - 2, the Central - 2 and Alandur depots have been upgraded to EV bus depots and officially operational. This brings the total count to 35 depots, though daily operations are dynamically managed across locations

The 35 depots of the Metropolitan Transport Corporation (as of 2026) are listed below:

| Depot | Depot code | Old code | Region | Fleet strength | Scheduled services |
|---|---|---|---|---|---|
| Adambakkam | AB | NIL | T.Nagar | 76 | 72 |
| Adyar | AD | B | Adyar | 196 | 188 |
| Anna Nagar (East) | AE | NIL | Ayanavaram | 36 | 34 |
| Alandur (EV) | AL | K | Chromepet | 51 | 51 |
| Ambattur Estate | AM | E | Anna Nagar | 160 | 148 |
| Anna Nagar (West) | AN | H | Anna Nagar | 201 | 191 |
| Avadi | AV | X | Anna Nagar | 178 | 168 |
| Ayanavaram | AY | C | Ayanavaram | 120 | 113 |
| Basin Bridge | BB | NIL | Ayanavaram | 84 | 78 |
| Central Depot - I (EV) | CD | NIL | Ayanavaram | 80 | 75 |
| Central Depot - II (EV) | CE | NIL | Ayanavaram | 24 | 24 |
| Chromepet - I | CR | W | Chromepet | 150 | 142 |
| Chromepet - II | CW | NIL | Chromepet | 95 | 84 |
| Ennore | EN | K | Tondiarpet | 88 | 84 |
| Iyyappanthangal | IY | Y | Vadapalani | 143 | 135 |
| Kannagi Nagar | KA | NIL | Adyar | 43 | 41 |
| Kilambakkam | KB | NIL | Chromepet | 123 | 117 |
| K.K.Nagar | KN | G | T.Nagar | 198 | 184 |
| Kundrathur | KU | NIL | Vadapalani | 38 | 36 |
| Mandaveli/Foreshore Estate | MN | J | Adyar | 69 | 65 |
| Madhavaram | MV | F | Tondiarpet | 156 | 148 |
| Perumbakkam (EV) | PE | NIL | Adyar | 131 | 125 |
| Padiyanallur | PL | NIL | Tondiarpet | 113 | 109 |
| Koyambedu (Temporary) | PM | NIL | Vadapalani | 173 | 164 |
| Poonamallee (EV) | PN | V, Z | Vadapalani | 131 | 115 |
| Perambur | PR | S | Ayanavaram | 132 | 125 |
| Semmencheri | SM | NIL | Adyar | 41 | 39 |
| Saidapet | SP | M | T.Nagar | 101 | 96 |
| Tambaram | TA | O | Chromepet | 202 | 193 |
| Tondiarpet - I (EV) | TD | A | Tondiarpet | 36 | 40 |
| T.Nagar | TN | L | T.Nagar | 72 | 68 |
| Thiruvanmiyur/Besant Nagar | TR | R | Adyar | 126 | 113 |
| Thiruvottriyur | TV | N | Tondiarpet | | |
| Tondiarpet - II | TW | T | Tondiarpet | 138 | 130 |
| Vadapalani | VP | D | Vadapalani | 178 | 168 |
| Vyasarpadi (EV) | VY | P | Anna Nagar | 136 | 130 |
| Total | | | | 3,944 | 3,718 |

== Revenue ==
As of 2012, MTC's advertisement revenue per month is ₹ 86 lakhs. About 2,000 of the MTC's 3,400 buses have been maintained by companies that advertise on the buses since December 2011, but the advertisement space was open for all to bid. In 2012, MTC decided to allow only those companies that take up the cleaning assignment. Still they will have to pay the market rate for the space, while they will get paid for the cleaning. As of 2012, the corporation pays ₹ 18 per bus per cleaner every day.

As of 17 Apr 2013 The total revenue per day of all the buses is 2.75 cr

== Occupancy ==
The MTC buses have an occupancy ratio (average number of passengers to total seating capacity in a bus) of 84.35%. Each MTC bus can carry 72 people, including 24 standing passengers. The occupancy ratio in Chennai is amongst the highest for the 38 transport corporations in the country.

== Connectivity with MRTS and airport ==
The MTC services are not integrated with the Mass Rapid Transit System. Some of the MRTS stations are located away from bus stops which makes transfers difficult. Recently mini-buses have started to ply as a feeder to plug the gaps in connectivity. There are buses to various parts of the city from the airport and some air passengers and many airport employees, use the service. The bus stop is close to the international terminal.

== Accidents ==
The accident rate of MTC is high compared to similar metropolitan transport corporations in the country. In Chennai, 104 people died in 2012 in accidents involving MTC buses. The driver unions are blamed for violations going unpunished and continuing unabated.

People killed in accidents involving MTC buses
| Year | 2007 | 2008 | 2009 | 2010 | 2011 | 2012 | 2013 | 2016 | 2017 | 2018 | 2019 |
| Fatal | 142 | 145 | 138 | 132 | 112 | 104 | 98 | 94 | 35 | 24 | 120 |

Accidents over the years
| Year | Fatal | Non-fatal |
| 2009 | 109 | 384 |
| 2010 | 106 | 351 |
| 2011 | 112 | 436 |
| 2012 | 103 | 351 |
| 2013 | 62 | 215 |
| 2016 | 61 | 214 |
| 2017 | 35 | 516 |
| 2018 | 24 | 401 |
| 2019 | 120 | 432 |

To mitigate the no. of accidents, officials of the corporation and the traffic police conduct refresher courses and yoga classes for MTC drivers.

== Complaints and Issues Faced ==
=== Overcrowding and infrequency ===
MTC buses can be very overcrowded with footboard traveling being a common occurrence in the ordinary buses with no doors, which has led to numerous accidents. The main reason for this overcrowding being the fact number of buses operated by the MTC is not enough to meet the requirement of such a large city, with the city needing a fleet of 5,160 buses just to meet the Union Ministry of Housing and Urban Affairs benchmark of 60 buses per 100,000 people, which in 2022 would require 1,706 additional buses. In addition a 2016 report by the Union Ministry of Road Transport and Highways found 72.1% of the buses to be overage.

MTC buses are also notorious for bus bunching (i.e. two or more buses of the same route arriving together) with commuters frequently complaining about not being able to get a bus for another 30 minutes afterwards. Many routes also suffer from a low frequency of buses.

=== Finances ===
MTC has been a loss making company for a long time which has hampered its ability to improve services or add new buses, however its previous attempt to increase fares in 2018 ended up causing a steep decline in daily passengers resulting in an even greater loss of ₹730.45 crore in financial year 2017–18 as against ₹519.48 crore in the previous financial year of 2016–17. MTC finances are also strained by the constant hikes in fuel prices. This weak financial position has led to it cutting back on some services.

Due to its weak financial position, MTC along with other STCs have found it difficult to pay their employees retirement benefits, dearness allowance, pensions, etc., with many social security measures remaining only on paper. The amount deducted from the employees' wages for welfare measures (such as health insurance) and retirement benefits is used up to finance day-to-day operation, resulting in the organisation being reliant on the state government to release funds for retirement benefits. Many retired employees have to wait for months to receive their pension, and dearness allowance arrears have been pending for years.

=== Other issues ===
There have complaints about operator behavior on MTC buses and these have been effectively addressed by the administration by having special counseling and yoga sessions for the workers. The entrances to most buses have at least two steps. This poses difficulty for some passengers to alight or board the buses. Some of the bus stations are poorly maintained.

MTC officials are under pressure from councilors and MLAs to introduce new bus routes to or through their constituency even though such a move may not be the most profitable of options. "While this is not always bad as certain routes need to be run even if they are not profitable, MTC as an operator should cover its basics first and meet the demands along high-capacity routes," said an expert in the field of public transport.

== See also ==
- State Express Transport Corporation
- Tamil Nadu State Transport Corporation
- Transport in Chennai
