= Tamil Nadu State Transport Corporation =

Public bus operator

Tamil Nadu State Transport Corporation Ltd.
- Native name: தமிழ்நாடு அரசுப் போக்குவரத்துக் கழகம் (த.அ.போ.க)
- Romanized name: Tamiḻnādu Arasu Pōkkuvarattuk Kazhakam
- Type: State-owned enterprise
- Industry: Public Transport
- Founded: 1972; 54 years ago
- Headquarters: Chennai, Tamil Nadu, India
- Area served: Tamil Nadu; Karnataka; Kerala; Andhra Pradesh; Puducherry
- Products: Bus transport and cargo transport services
- Revenue: ▲₹288,800,000 (US$3.0 million) per day
- Owner: Government of Tamil Nadu
- Number of employees: 1,23,317
- Parent: Department of Transport (Tamil Nadu)
- Subsidiaries: Metropolitan Transport Corporation (Chennai) Ltd.; State Express Transport Corporation (Tamil Nadu) Ltd.
- Website: TNSTC

Tamil Nadu State Transport Corporation Ltd (TNSTC) is a government owned public transport bus operator in Tamil Nadu, India. It operates Intercity bus services to cities within Tamil Nadu, and from Tamil Nadu to its neighbouring states. It also operates town busses from major cities and towns of Tamil Nadu to its neighbourhoods, with the exception of Chennai, where the public bus service is operated by MTC, a subsidiary of TNSTC. It is a bus operator with over 20258 buses and 17 million daily ridership.

== Services ==
Cd by the Government of Tamil Nadu. TNSTC has started online booking facilities to book bus tickets between major cities served by TNSTC. It caters to all the districts within Tamil Nadu and also operates services to neighbouring states of Andhra Pradesh, Karnataka, Kerala and union territory of Puducherry. Until 1997, the transport corporation was divided into 21 divisions which were later merged to form 8 divisions. TNSTC along with its subsidiaries, owns 321 depots and five workshops with a combined fleet strength of 21,678 buses. TNSTC also offers contract and tourist services. Every bus owned by the corporation displays a portrait of Tamil poet Thiruvalluvar along with a two-line verse from Thirukkural inside the bus.

== History ==
The planning commission, in consultation with this ministry, has advised the state government to set up a road transport corporation under the Transport Corporations Act and the matter is under the consideration of the state government. Operation of nationalized transport services through a corporation is favoured so as to achieve railroad coordination, and to ensure operation on business lines. The general policy of the government is to establish corporations and the planning commission have advised that if the state governments want to nationalise the road services, they should form corporations and they should not be run as far as possible through government departments. It has also been suggested by the planning commission that the railways should participate or contribute to the state governments for running all the nationalised road services only when they decide to set up a corporation.

Current names	Former names (till 1996)	Former names named after
Tamil Nadu State Transport Corporation - Kovai தமிழ்நாடு அரசு போக்குவரத்து கழகம் - கோவை Tamiḻnāṭu Aracu Pōkkuvarattu Kaḻakam - Kōvai	Cheran Transport Corporation (CTC) - Kovai சேரன் போக்குவரத்து கழகம் - கோவை Cēraṉ Pōkkuvarattu Kaḻakam - Kōvai	Chera Dynasty சேர வம்சம் Cēra Vamcam
Tamil Nadu State Transport Corporation - Kovai தமிழ்நாடு அரசு போக்குவரத்து கழகம் - கோவை Tamiḻnāṭu Aracu Pōkkuvarattu Kaḻakam - Kōvai	Jeeva Transport Corporation (JTC) - Erode ஜீவா போக்குவரத்து கழகம் - ஈரோடு Jīvā Pōkkuvarattu Kaḻakam - Īrōṭu	P. Jeevanandham பி. ஜீவானந்தம் Pi.Jīvāṉantam
Tamil Nadu State Transport Corporation - Kovai தமிழ்நாடு அரசு போக்குவரத்து கழகம் - கோவை Tamiḻnāṭu Aracu Pōkkuvarattu Kaḻakam - Kōvai	Mahakavi Bharathiyar Transport Corporation (MBTC) - Udagai மகாகவி பாரதியார் போக்குவரத்து கழகம் - உதகை Makākavi Pāratiyār Pōkkuvarattu Kaḻakam - Utakai	Mahakavi C. Subramania Bharati மகாகவி சி.சுப்பிரமணிய பாரதி Makākavi Ci.Cuppiramaṇiya Pārati
Tamil Nadu State Transport Corporation - Kumbakonam தமிழ்நாடு அரசு போக்குவரத்து கழகம் - கும்பகோணம் Tamiḻnāṭu Aracu Pōkkuvarattu Kaḻakam - Kumpakōṇam	Cholan Roadways Corporation (CRC) - Kumbakonam சோழன் போக்குவரத்து கழகம் - கும்பகோணம் Cōḻaṉ Pōkkuvarattu Kaḻakam - Kumpakōṇam	Chola Dynasty சோழ வம்சம் Cōḻa Vamcam
Tamil Nadu State Transport Corporation - Kumbakonam தமிழ்நாடு அரசு போக்குவரத்து கழகம் - கும்பகோணம் Tamiḻnāṭu Aracu Pōkkuvarattu Kaḻakam - Kumpakōṇam	Dheeran Chinnamalai Transport Corporation (DCTC) - Trichy தீரன் சின்னமலை போக்குவரத்து கழகம் - திருச்சி Tīraṉ Ciṉṉamalai Pōkkuvarattu Kaḻakam - Tirucci	Dheeran Chinnamalai தீரன் சின்னமலை Tīraṉ Ciṉṉamalai
Tamil Nadu State Transport Corporation - Kumbakonam தமிழ்நாடு அரசு போக்குவரத்து கழகம் - கும்பகோணம் Tamiḻnāṭu Aracu Pōkkuvarattu Kaḻakam - Kumpakōṇam	Veeran Azhagumuthukone Transport Corporation (VATC) - Pudukkottai வீரன் அழகுமுத்துக்கோன் போக்குவரத்து கழகம் - புதுக்கோட்டை Vīraṉ Aḻakumuttukkōṉe Pōkkuvarattu Kaḻakam - Putukkōṭṭai	Maveeran Alagumuthu Kone மாவீரன் அழகுமுத்து கோன் Māvīraṉ Aḻakumuttu Kōṉ
Tamil Nadu State Transport Corporation - Kumbakonam தமிழ்நாடு அரசு போக்குவரத்து கழகம் - கும்பகோணம் Tamiḻnāṭu Aracu Pōkkuvarattu Kaḻakam - Kumpakōṇam	Maruthu Pandiyar Transport Corporation (MPTC) - Karaikkudi மருது பாண்டியர் போக்குவரத்து கழகம் - காரைக்குடி Marutu Pāṇṭiyar Pōkkuvarattu Kaḻakam - Kāraikkuṭi	Maruthu Pandiyar மருது பாண்டியர் Marutu Pāṇṭiyar
Tamil Nadu State Transport Corporation - Madurai தமிழ்நாடு அரசு போக்குவரத்து கழகம் - மதுரை Tamiḻnāṭu Aracu Pōkkuvarattu Kaḻakam - Maturai	Pandiyan Roadways Corporation (PRC) - Madurai பாண்டியன் போக்குவரத்து கழகம் - மதுரை Pāṇṭiyaṉ Pōkkuvarattu Kaḻakam - Maturai	Pandiya Dynasty பாண்டிய வம்சம் Pāṇṭiya Vamcam
Tamil Nadu State Transport Corporation - Madurai தமிழ்நாடு அரசு போக்குவரத்து கழகம் - மதுரை Tamiḻnāṭu Aracu Pōkkuvarattu Kaḻakam - Maturai	Rani Mangammal Transport Corporation (RMTC) - Dindigul ராணி மங்கம்மாள் போக்குவரத்து கழகம் - திண்டுக்கல் Rāṇi Maṅkam'māḷ Pōkkuvarattu Kaḻakam - Tiṇṭukkal	Rani Mangammal ராணி மங்கம்மாள் Rāṇi Maṅkam'māḷ
Tamil Nadu State Transport Corporation - Madurai தமிழ்நாடு அரசு போக்குவரத்து கழகம் - மதுரை Tamiḻnāṭu Aracu Pōkkuvarattu Kaḻakam - Maturai	Veeran Sundaralingam Transport Corporation (VSTC) - Virudhunagar வீரன் சுந்தரலிங்கம் போக்குவரத்து கழகம் - விருதுநகர் Vīraṉ Cuntaraliṅkam Pōkkuvarattu Kaḻakam - Virutunakar	Veeran Sundaralingam Kudumbanar வீரன் சுந்தரலிங்கம் குடும்பனார் Vīraṉ Cuntaraliṅkam Kuṭumpaṉār
Tamil Nadu State Transport Corporation - Salem தமிழ்நாடு அரசு போக்குவரத்து கழகம் - சேலம் Tamiḻnāṭu Aracu Pōkkuvarattu Kaḻakam - Cēlam	Anna Transport Corporation (ATC) - Salem அண்ணா போக்குவரத்து கழகம் - சேலம் Aṇṇā Pōkkuvarattu Kaḻakam - Cēlam	Perarignar Conjeevaram Natarajan Annadurai பேரறிஞர் காஞ்சீவரம் நடராஜன் அண்ணாதுரை Pēraṟiñar Kāñcīvaram Naṭarājaṉ Aṇṇāturai
Tamil Nadu State Transport Corporation - Salem தமிழ்நாடு அரசு போக்குவரத்து கழகம் - சேலம் Tamiḻnāṭu Aracu Pōkkuvarattu Kaḻakam - Cēlam	Annai Sathya Transport Corporation (ASTC) - Dharmapuri அன்னை சத்யா போக்குவரத்து கழகம் - தர்மபுரி Aṉṉai Catyā Pōkkuvarattu Kaḻakam - Tarmapuri	Annai Dr Sathyavani Muthu அன்னை டாக்டர் சத்தியவாணி முத்து Aṉṉai Tākṭar Cattiyavāṇi Muttu
Tamil Nadu State Transport Corporation - Tirunelveli தமிழ்நாடு அரசு போக்குவரத்து கழகம் - திருநெல்வேலி Tamiḻnāṭu Aracu Pōkkuvarattu Kaḻakam - Tirunelvēli	Kattabomman Transport Corporation (KTC) - Tirunelveli கட்டபொம்மன் போக்குவரத்து கழகம் - திருநெல்வேலி Kaṭṭapom'maṉ Pōkkuvarattu Kaḻakam - Tirunelvēli	Veerapandiya Kattabomman வீரபாண்டிய கட்டபொம்மன் Vīrapāṇṭiya Kaṭṭapom'maṉ
Tamil Nadu State Transport Corporation - Tirunelveli தமிழ்நாடு அரசு போக்குவரத்து கழகம் - திருநெல்வேலி Tamiḻnāṭu Aracu Pōkkuvarattu Kaḻakam - Tirunelvēli	Nesamony Transport Corporation (NTC) - Nagercoil நேசமணி போக்குவரத்து கழகம் - நாகர்கோவில் Nēcamaṇi Pōkkuvarattu Kaḻakam - Nākarkōvil	Marshal A. Nesamony மார்ஷல் ஏ. நேசமோனி Mārṣal Ē. Nēcamōṉi
Tamil Nadu State Transport Corporation - Villupuram தமிழ்நாடு அரசு போக்குவரத்து கழகம் - விழுப்புரம் Tamiḻnāṭu Aracu Pōkkuvarattu Kaḻakam - Viḻuppuram	Thanthai Periyar Transport Corporation (TPTC) - Villupuram தந்தை பெரியார் போக்குவரத்து கழகம் - விழுப்புரம் Tantai Periyār Pōkkuvarattu Kaḻakam - Viḻuppuram	Thanthai Periyar Erode Venkatappa Ramasamy Naicker தந்தை பெரியார் ஈரோடு வெங்கடப்ப ராமசாமி நாயக்கர் Tantai Periyār Īrōṭu Veṅkaṭappa Rāmacāmi Nāyakkar
Tamil Nadu State Transport Corporation - Villupuram தமிழ்நாடு அரசு போக்குவரத்து கழகம் - விழுப்புரம் Tamiḻnāṭu Aracu Pōkkuvarattu Kaḻakam - Viḻuppuram	Pattukottai Alagiri Transport Corporation (PATC) - Vellore பட்டுக்கோட்டை அழகிரி போக்குவரத்து கழகம் - வேலூர் Paṭṭukkōṭṭai Aḻakiri Pōkkuvarattu Kaḻakam - Vēlūr	Pattukottai Alagiriswamy பட்டுக்கோட்டை அழகிரிசுவாமி Paṭṭukkōṭṭai Aḻakiricuvāmi
Tamil Nadu State Transport Corporation - Villupuram தமிழ்நாடு அரசு போக்குவரத்து கழகம் - விழுப்புரம் Tamiḻnāṭu Aracu Pōkkuvarattu Kaḻakam - Viḻuppuram	Puratchi Thalaivar MGR Transport Corporation (MGRTC) - Kanchipuram புரட்சி தலைவர் எம்ஜிஆர் போக்குவரத்து கழகம் - காஞ்சிபுரம் Puraṭci Talaivar Emji'ār Pōkkuvarattu Kaḻakam - Kāñcipuram	Bharat Ratna Puratchi Thalaivar Dr Maruthur Gopalan Menon Ramachandran பாரத ரத்னா புரட்சி தலைவர் டாக்டர் மருதூர் கோபாலன் மேனன் ராமச்சந்திரன் Pārata Ratṉā Puraṭci Talaivar Ṭākṭar Marutūr Kōpālaṉ Mēṉaṉ Rāmaccantiraṉ
State Express Transport Corporation - Tamil Nadu அரசு விரைவு போக்குவரத்து கழகம் - தமிழ்நாடு Aracu Viraivu Pōkkuvarattu Kaḻakam - Tamiḻnāṭu	Thiruvalluvar Transport Corporation (TTC) - Intrastate Express Service திருவள்ளுவர் போக்குவரத்து கழகம் (TTC) - மாநிலத்திற்குள்ளான விரைவு சேவை Tiruvaḷḷuvar Pōkkuvarattu Kaḻakam - Mānilattiṟkuḷḷāṉa Viraivu Cēvai	Thiruvalluvar திருவள்ளுவர் Tiruvaḷḷuvar
State Express Transport Corporation - Tamil Nadu அரசு விரைவு போக்குவரத்து கழகம் - தமிழ்நாடு Aracu Viraivu Pōkkuvarattu Kaḻakam - Tamiḻnāṭu	Rajiv Gandhi Transport Corporation (RGTC) (1996) - Interstate Express Service ராஜீவ் காந்தி போக்குவரத்து கழகம் (1996) - மாநிலங்களுக்கு இடையேயான விரைவு சேவை Rājīv Kānti Pōkkuvarattu Kaḻakam (1996) - Kānilaṅkaḷukku Iṭaiyēyāṉa Viraivu Cēvai: Puratchi Thalaivi Dr J. Jayalalithaa Transport Corporation (JJTC) (1994-1996) புரட்சி தலைவி டாக்டர் ஜெ. ஜெயலலிதா போக்குவரத்து கழகம் Puraṭci Talaivi Ṭākṭar Je. Jeyalalitā Pōkkuvarattu Kaḻakam	Rajivaratna Gandhi ராஜீவரத்ன காந்தி Rājīvaratṉa Kānti: Puratchi Thalaivi Dr Jayaram Jayalalithaa புரட்சி தலைவி டாக்டர் ஜெயராம் ஜெயலலிதா Puraṭci Talaivi Ṭākṭar Jeyarām Jeyalalitā
Metropolitan Transport Corporation - Chennai மகாநகர போக்குவரத்து கழகம் - சென்னை Makānakara Pōkkuvarattu Kaḻakam - Ceṉṉai	Pallavan Transport Corporation (PTC) - South Chennai பல்லவன் போக்குவரத்து கழகம் - தென் சென்னை Pallavaṉ Pōkkuvarattu Kaḻakam - Teṉ Ceṉṉai	Pallava Dynasty பல்லவ வம்சம் Pallava Vamcam
Metropolitan Transport Corporation - Chennai மகாநகர போக்குவரத்து கழகம் - சென்னை Makānakara Pōkkuvarattu Kaḻakam - Ceṉṉai	Dr Ambedkar Transport Corporation (DATC) - North Chennai டாக்டர் அம்பேத்கர் போக்குவரத்து கழகம் - வட சென்னை Ṭākṭar Ampētkar Pōkkuvarattu Kaḻakam - Vaṭa Ceṉṉai	Babasaheb Dr Bhimrao Ramji Ambedkar பாபாசாகேப் டாக்டர் பீம்ராவ் ராம்ஜி அம்பேத்கர் Pāpācākēp Ṭākṭar Pīmrāv Rāmji Ampētkar

All the road transport corporations named after a popular or historical figure were changed to the current names after caste violence erupted between the caste groups of Devendrakula Velalars and Maravars in Virudhunagar district (then Kamarajar district), after the formation of Veeran Sundaralingam Transport Corporation (VSTC) by the bifurcation of Pandiyan Roadways Corporation (PRC). The Maravars opposed the naming of the new corporation on Veeran Sundaralingam, who is supposedly believed from the Devendrakula Velalar community.

== Structure ==
TNSTC is composed of eight state transport undertaking divisions across the state.

Divisions	Regions	Regional Transport Office (RTO) Registration Number	Regional Transport Office (RTO) Name	Divisional Code	Covering Districts and Locale
Tamil Nadu State Transport Corporation - Coimbatore	Coimbatore	TN 38	Coimbatore North	CBE	Coimbatore district; Nilgiris district; Erode district; Tiruppur district
Tamil Nadu State Transport Corporation - Coimbatore	Coimbatore	TN 43	Udagai	CBE	Coimbatore district; Nilgiris district; Erode district; Tiruppur district
Tamil Nadu State Transport Corporation - Coimbatore	Erode	TN 33	Erode East	CBE	Coimbatore district; Nilgiris district; Erode district; Tiruppur district
Tamil Nadu State Transport Corporation - Coimbatore	Tiruppur	TN 39	Tiruppur North	CBE	Coimbatore district; Nilgiris district; Erode district; Tiruppur district
Tamil Nadu State Transport Corporation - Kumbakonam	Kumbakonam	TN 68	Kumbakonam	KUM	Thanjavur district; Nagapattinam district; Mayiladuthurai district; Thiruvarur District; Tiruchirappalli district; Perambalur district; Ariyalur district; Karur district; Ramanathapuram district; Sivaganga district (Some); Pudukkottai district; Karaikal district (Puducherry UT)
Tamil Nadu State Transport Corporation - Kumbakonam	Kumbakonam	TN 49	Thanjavur	KUM	Thanjavur district; Nagapattinam district; Mayiladuthurai district; Thiruvarur District; Tiruchirappalli district; Perambalur district; Ariyalur district; Karur district; Ramanathapuram district; Sivaganga district (Some); Pudukkottai district; Karaikal district (Puducherry UT)
Tamil Nadu State Transport Corporation - Kumbakonam	Nagapattinam	TN 51	Nagapattinam	KUM	Thanjavur district; Nagapattinam district; Mayiladuthurai district; Thiruvarur District; Tiruchirappalli district; Perambalur district; Ariyalur district; Karur district; Ramanathapuram district; Sivaganga district (Some); Pudukkottai district; Karaikal district (Puducherry UT)
Tamil Nadu State Transport Corporation - Kumbakonam	Tiruchirappalli	TN 45	Trichy West	KUM	Thanjavur district; Nagapattinam district; Mayiladuthurai district; Thiruvarur District; Tiruchirappalli district; Perambalur district; Ariyalur district; Karur district; Ramanathapuram district; Sivaganga district (Some); Pudukkottai district; Karaikal district (Puducherry UT)
Tamil Nadu State Transport Corporation - Kumbakonam	Karur	TN 45	Trichy West	KUM	Thanjavur district; Nagapattinam district; Mayiladuthurai district; Thiruvarur District; Tiruchirappalli district; Perambalur district; Ariyalur district; Karur district; Ramanathapuram district; Sivaganga district (Some); Pudukkottai district; Karaikal district (Puducherry UT)
Tamil Nadu State Transport Corporation - Kumbakonam	Pudukkottai	TN 55	Pudukkottai	KUM	Thanjavur district; Nagapattinam district; Mayiladuthurai district; Thiruvarur District; Tiruchirappalli district; Perambalur district; Ariyalur district; Karur district; Ramanathapuram district; Sivaganga district (Some); Pudukkottai district; Karaikal district (Puducherry UT)
Tamil Nadu State Transport Corporation - Kumbakonam	Karaikkudi	TN 63	Sivaganga	KUM	Thanjavur district; Nagapattinam district; Mayiladuthurai district; Thiruvarur District; Tiruchirappalli district; Perambalur district; Ariyalur district; Karur district; Ramanathapuram district; Sivaganga district (Some); Pudukkottai district; Karaikal district (Puducherry UT)
Tamil Nadu State Transport Corporation - Madurai	Madurai	TN 58	Madurai South	MDU	Madurai district; Dindigul district; Theni district; Virudhunagar district; Sivaganga district (Some)
Tamil Nadu State Transport Corporation - Madurai	Madurai	TN 59	Madurai North	MDU	Madurai district; Dindigul district; Theni district; Virudhunagar district; Sivaganga district (Some)
Tamil Nadu State Transport Corporation - Madurai	Dindigul	TN 57	Dindigul	MDU	Madurai district; Dindigul district; Theni district; Virudhunagar district; Sivaganga district (Some)
Tamil Nadu State Transport Corporation - Madurai	Virudhunagar	TN 67	Virudhunagar	MDU	Madurai district; Dindigul district; Theni district; Virudhunagar district; Sivaganga district (Some)
Tamil Nadu State Transport Corporation - Salem	Salem	TN 30	Salem West	SLM	Salem district; Namakkal district; Dharmapuri district; Krishnagiri district; Tirupathur district (Some)
Tamil Nadu State Transport Corporation - Salem	Dharmapuri	TN 29	Dharmapuri	SLM	Salem district; Namakkal district; Dharmapuri district; Krishnagiri district; Tirupathur district (Some)
Tamil Nadu State Transport Corporation - Tirunelveli	Tirunelveli	TN 72	Tirunelveli	TNV	Tirunelveli district; Tenkasi district; Thoothukudi district; Kanyakumari district
Tamil Nadu State Transport Corporation - Tirunelveli	Thoothukudi	TN 69	Tirunelveli	TNV	Tirunelveli district; Tenkasi district; Thoothukudi district; Kanyakumari district
Tamil Nadu State Transport Corporation - Tirunelveli	Nagercoil	TN 74	Nagercoil	TNV	Tirunelveli district; Tenkasi district; Thoothukudi district; Kanyakumari district
Tamil Nadu State Transport Corporation - Villupuram	Villupuram	TN 32	Villupuram	VPM	Villuppuram district; Kallakurichi district; Cuddalore district; Vellore district; Tirupathur district (Some); Ranipet district; Kanchipuram district; Chengalpattu district; Tiruvannamalai district; Tiruvallur district; Puducherry district (Puducherry UT)
Tamil Nadu State Transport Corporation - Villupuram	Cuddalore	TN 31	Cuddalore	VPM	Villuppuram district; Kallakurichi district; Cuddalore district; Vellore district; Tirupathur district (Some); Ranipet district; Kanchipuram district; Chengalpattu district; Tiruvannamalai district; Tiruvallur district; Puducherry district (Puducherry UT)
Tamil Nadu State Transport Corporation - Villupuram	Kanchipuram	TN 21	Kanchipuram	VPM	Villuppuram district; Kallakurichi district; Cuddalore district; Vellore district; Tirupathur district (Some); Ranipet district; Kanchipuram district; Chengalpattu district; Tiruvannamalai district; Tiruvallur district; Puducherry district (Puducherry UT)
Tamil Nadu State Transport Corporation - Villupuram	Tiruvallur	TN 21	Kanchipuram	VPM	Villuppuram district; Kallakurichi district; Cuddalore district; Vellore district; Tirupathur district (Some); Ranipet district; Kanchipuram district; Chengalpattu district; Tiruvannamalai district; Tiruvallur district; Puducherry district (Puducherry UT)
Tamil Nadu State Transport Corporation - Villupuram	Vellore	TN 23	Vellore	VPM	Villuppuram district; Kallakurichi district; Cuddalore district; Vellore district; Tirupathur district (Some); Ranipet district; Kanchipuram district; Chengalpattu district; Tiruvannamalai district; Tiruvallur district; Puducherry district (Puducherry UT)
Tamil Nadu State Transport Corporation - Villupuram	Tiruvannamalai	TN 25	Tiruvannamalai	VPM	Villuppuram district; Kallakurichi district; Cuddalore district; Vellore district; Tirupathur district (Some); Ranipet district; Kanchipuram district; Chengalpattu district; Tiruvannamalai district; Tiruvallur district; Puducherry district (Puducherry UT)
Metropolitan Transport Corporation - Chennai	Adyar	TN 01	Chennai Central	MTC	Chennai Metropolitan Area
Metropolitan Transport Corporation - Chennai	Anna Nagar	TN 01	Chennai Central	MTC	Chennai Metropolitan Area
Metropolitan Transport Corporation - Chennai	Ayanavaram	TN 01	Chennai Central	MTC	Chennai Metropolitan Area
Metropolitan Transport Corporation - Chennai	Chromepet	TN 01	Chennai Central	MTC	Chennai Metropolitan Area
Metropolitan Transport Corporation - Chennai	T.Nagar	TN 01	Chennai Central	MTC	Chennai Metropolitan Area
Metropolitan Transport Corporation - Chennai	Tondiarpet	TN 01	Chennai Central	MTC	Chennai Metropolitan Area
Metropolitan Transport Corporation - Chennai	Vadapalani	TN 01	Chennai Central	MTC	Chennai Metropolitan Area
State Express Transport Corporation - Tamil Nadu	Not Applicable	TN 01	Chennai Central	Not Applicable	Entirety of the state of Tamil Nadu; Parts of the neighboring states of Andhra Pradesh, Karnataka, Kerala and the union territory of Puducherry

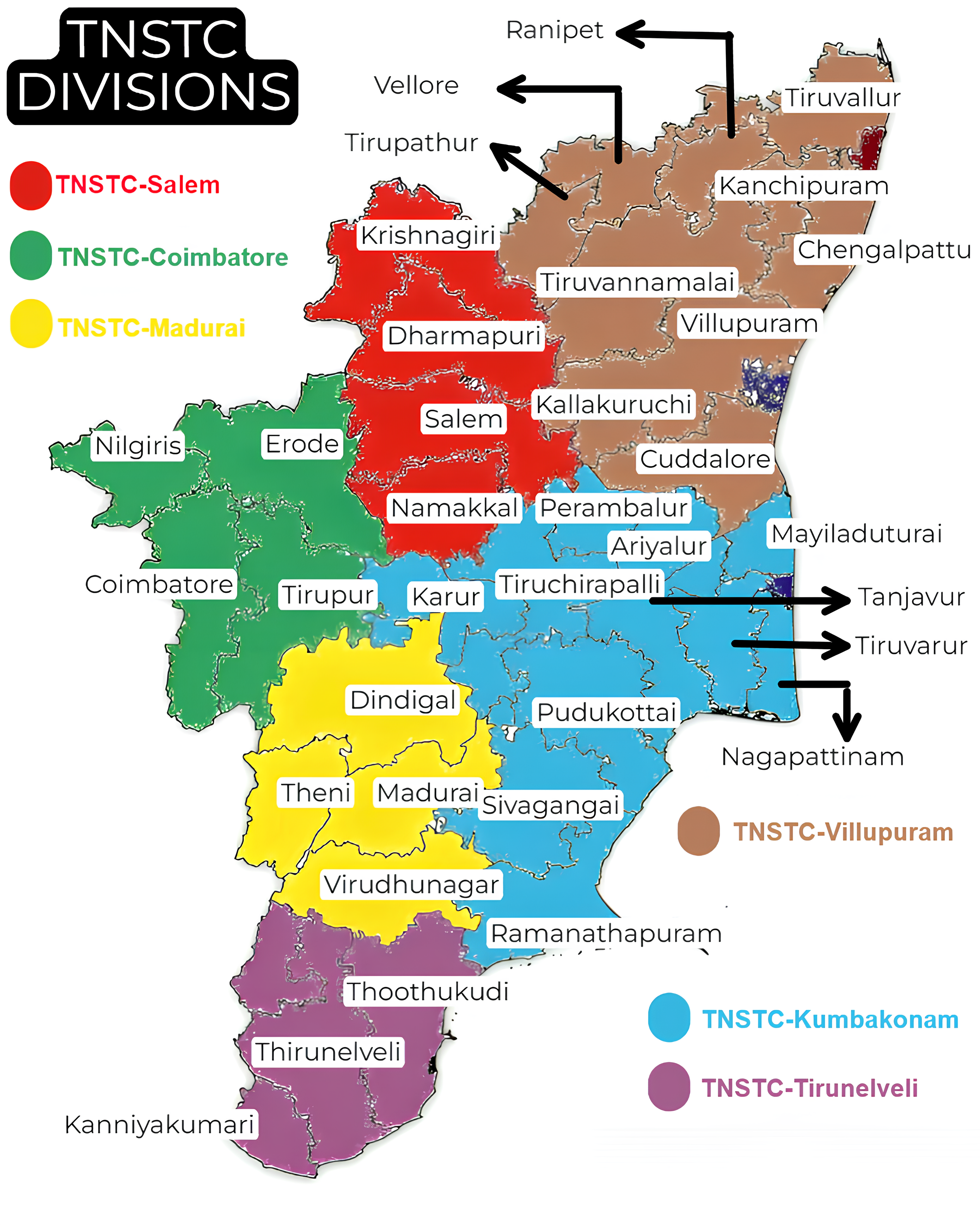
This image shows the Tamil Nadu State Transport Corporation (TNSTC) map.

== Services ==
- Economy Service: It is a non-AC bus service with 3+2 non-reclining seater seats built on single-axle Ashok Leyland or Tata chassis with an old green-cream livery or a new blue-grey livery.
- Superfast Service (SFS): It is a non-AC bus service with 3+2 non-reclining seater seats built on single-axle Ashok Leyland or Tata chassis with select few stops and a new blue-grey livery.
- Superfast Service AC (SFS AC): It is an AC bus service with 3+2 non-reclining seater seats built on single-axle Ashok Leyland or Tata chassis with select few stops and a new dark blue livery.
- Point-to-Point Service (PP): It is a non-AC bus service with 3+2 non-reclining seater seats built on single-axle Ashok Leyland or Tata chassis with no stops in between and a new blue-grey livery.
- Point-to-Point AC (PP AC): It is an AC bus service with 3+2 non-reclining seater seats built on single-axle Ashok Leyland or Tata chassis with no stops in between and a new dark blue livery.
- Ordinary Pink City or Pink Local Service: It is a non-AC bus service with 2+2 bench type non-reclining seater seats built on single-axle Ashok Leyland or Tata chassis with a brown-cream livery with front and back sides in pink. Female passengers can travel for free on these buses.
- Ordinary City or Local Service: It is a non-AC bus service with 2+2 bench type non-reclining seater seats built on single-axle Ashok Leyland or Tata chassis with a brown-cream livery.
- Mini Bus Service: It is a non-AC mini bus service with 2+2 bench type non-reclining seater seats built on single-axle Ashok Leyland chassis with a grey livery. It was launched to connect remote places, suburbs and also act as a feeder service.
- Deluxe City Service: It is a non-AC bus service with 2+2 non-reclining seater seats built on single-axle Ashok Leyland or Tata chassis with lesser stops and a red livery.
- Deluxe City AC Service: It is an AC bus service with 2+2 non-reclining seater seats built on single-axle Ashok Leyland or Tata chassis with lesser stops and a new red-grey livery.
- Ultra Deluxe: It is a non-AC bus service with 2+2 reclining seater seats built on single-axle Ashok Leyland chassis with a white(new) or Gr(old) livery.
- Classic: It is a non-AC bus service with 2+2 reclining seater seats and a toilet facility built on single-axle Ashok Leyland chassis with a green livery.
- Non-AC Sleeper: It is a non-AC bus service with 2+1 lower and upper berth sleeper seats built on single-axle Ashok Leyland chassis with a white livery.
- Non-AC Steater Cum Sleeper: It is a non-AC bus service with 2+1 reclining seater seats and 2+1 upper berth sleeper seats built on single-axle Ashok Leyland chassis with a white livery.
- AC Seater: It is an AC bus service with 2+2 reclining seater seats built on single-axle Ashok Leyland chassis with a white or green livery.
- AC Sleeper: It is an AC bus service with 2+1 lower and upper berth sleeper seats built on single-axle Ashok Leyland or MG Leera chassis with a white livery.
- AC Seater cum Sleeper: It is an AC bus service with 2+1 reclining seater seats and 2+1 upper berth sleeper seats built on single-axle MG Leera chassis with a white livery.

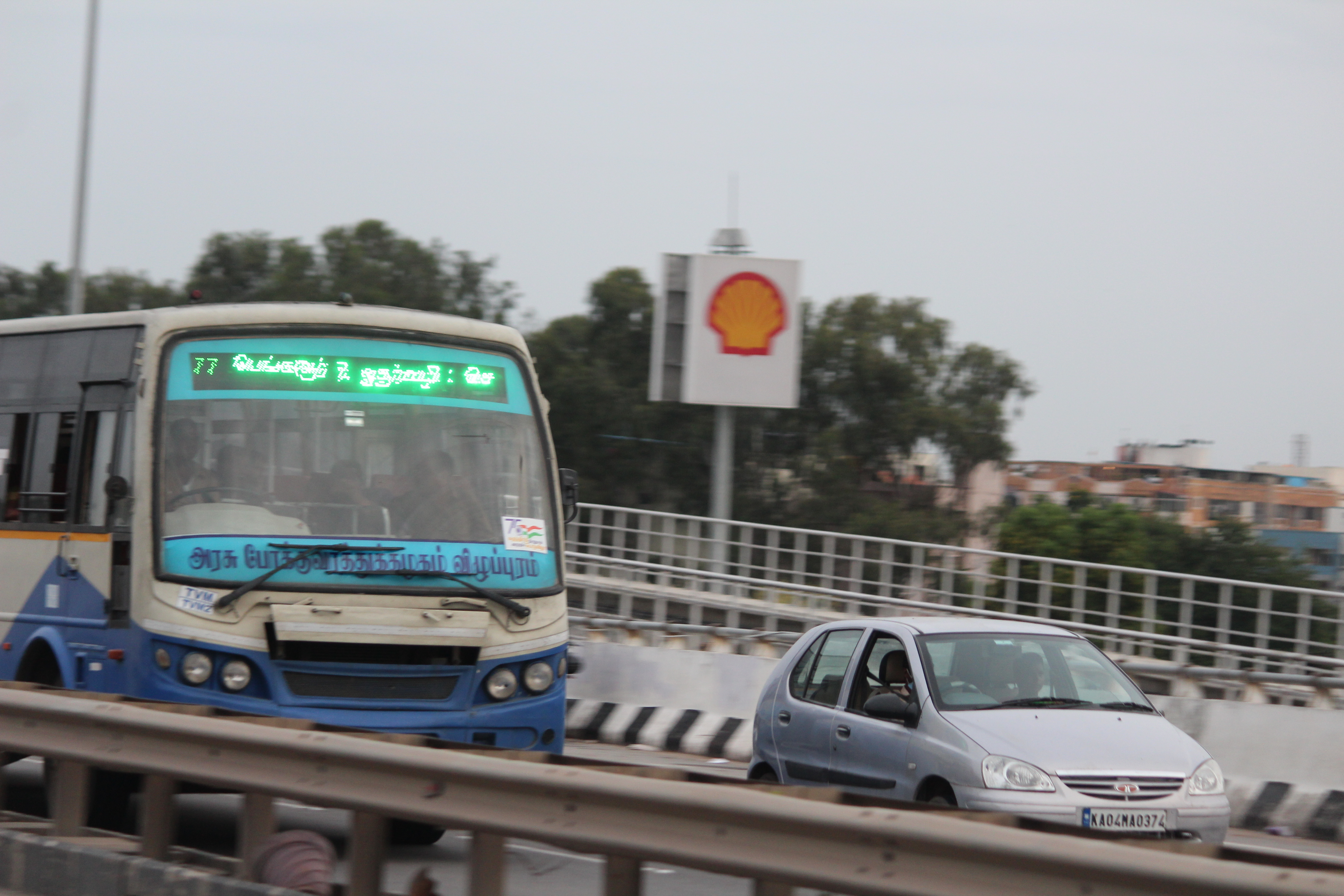
A TNSTC - Villupuram Bus (Route No. 477 Tiruvannamalai to Bengaluru)on Hosur Road's Bengaluru Elevated Tollway (Electronic City Elevated Expressway) in the neighbouring state of Karnataka's capital Bengaluru.

== Other ventures ==
On 25 March 1975, Tamil Nadu Transport Development Finance Corporation has been inaugurated in order to generate revenues for the state owned public transportation network. It is registered under RBI as non banking financial company. It provides essential loans, working capital, capital expenditure for State Transport Corporation to procure new busses and infrastructure upgradation. The operation capital has been raised through secure financial services from public, senior citizens, educational trust, temples and government institutions. It also offers public deposit schemes for stable returns.

In 1984, Tamil Nadu State Transport Corporation Limited established the Institute of Road and Transport Technology in Erode as the automobile research oriented institute with the vast area of 396 acres. It is a government institution listed as a category 1 college by the Directorate of Technical Education, Tamil Nadu.

In 1992, TNSTC established IRT Perundurai Medical College in Erode. It was established along the Perundurai Sanatorium which was running from 1930. The college has 600 beds and started functioning in 1992. In 2004, doctors' quarters were added. In 2008, a school of nursing has been started in the RTS Hospital premises. And in 2017, the strength of the Medical College was increased from 60 to 100 students intake.

In 1992-1993 TNSTC established IRT Polytechnic colleges (now undertaken by Government of Tamilnadu) in Thirunelveli and Bargur.

TNSTC also established In 2013, Tamil Nadu State Transport Corporation Limited established Amma Kudineer (Amma packaged drinking water) which is involved in the production and packaging of mineral water in one-litre plastic bottles, and selling them in long-distance running state-owned buses and in bus stations. The price has been fixed at ₹10 per bottle, and the production plant is set up in Gummidipoondi in Thiruvallur district. This venture is closed.
