= State Express Transport Corporation =

Indian state-owned transport corporation

State Express Transport Corporation - Tamil Nadu Ltd. அரசு விரைவு போக்குவரத்து கழகம்

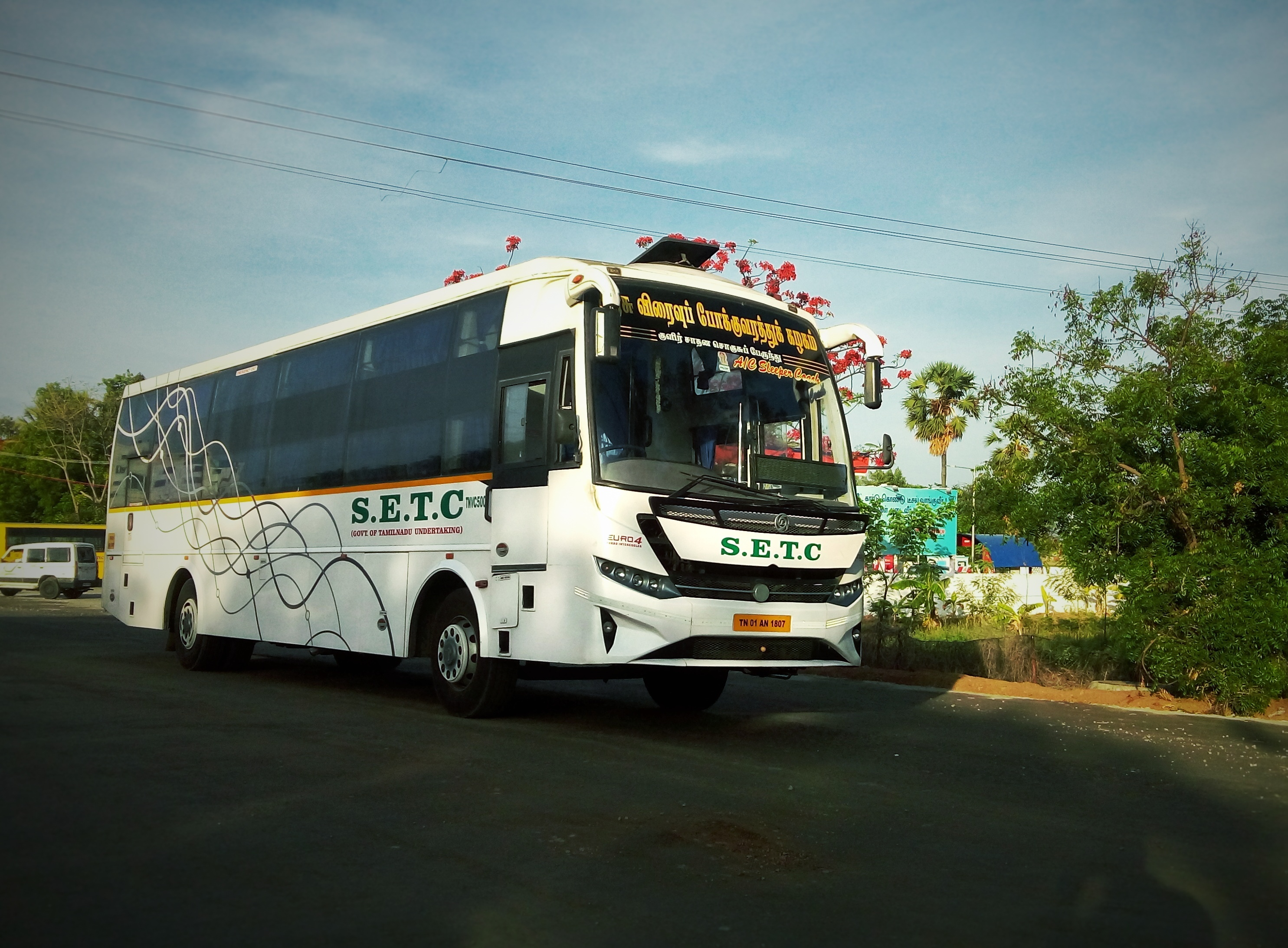
- Native name: அரசு விரைவு போக்குவரத்து கழகம் - தமிழ்நாடு
- Romanized name: Aracu Viraivu Pōkkuvarattu Kaḻakam - Tamiḻnāṭu
- Formerly: Thiruvalluvar Transport Corporation; Rajiv Gandhi Transport Corporation
- Type: Public Sector Corporation under the Ministry of Transport of the State Government of Tamil Nadu
- Industry: Public transport bus service
- Founded: 1997
- Headquarters: Chennai, Tamil Nadu
- Area served: Tamil Nadu; Karnataka; Kerala; Andhra Pradesh; Puducherry
- Products: Bus transport, cargo transport, services
- Owner: Government of Tamil Nadu
- Parent: Tamilnadu State Transport Undertakings
- Website: SETC

State Express Transport Corporation (Tamil Nadu) Limited - (SETC) is a state-owned transport corporation. It runs long-distance mofussil services exceeding 300 km and above throughout the state of Tamil Nadu and major cities in adjoining states of Andhra Pradesh, Karnataka, Kerala and the union territory of Puducherry. This is one of eight transport corporations currently operating in Tamil Nadu. It is registered under the Companies Act,1956, and its registered office is situated in Chennai.

== History ==
A separate entity exclusively for operating long-distance express services was conceived by the Government of Tamil Nadu in 1975, and the services were transferred to the newly formed express wing of Pallavan Transport Corporation with effect from 15 September 1975. It was formally registered on 14 January 1980 and renamed the Thiruvalluvar Transport Corporation (TTC) in honor of the Tamil poet Thiruvalluvar. During the 1990s, RGTC was formed, which operated interstate routes of the erstwhile TTC. JJTC was then renamed as RGTC in 1996. Both TTC and RGTC were later merged into the State Express Transport Corporation (SETC) in 1997.

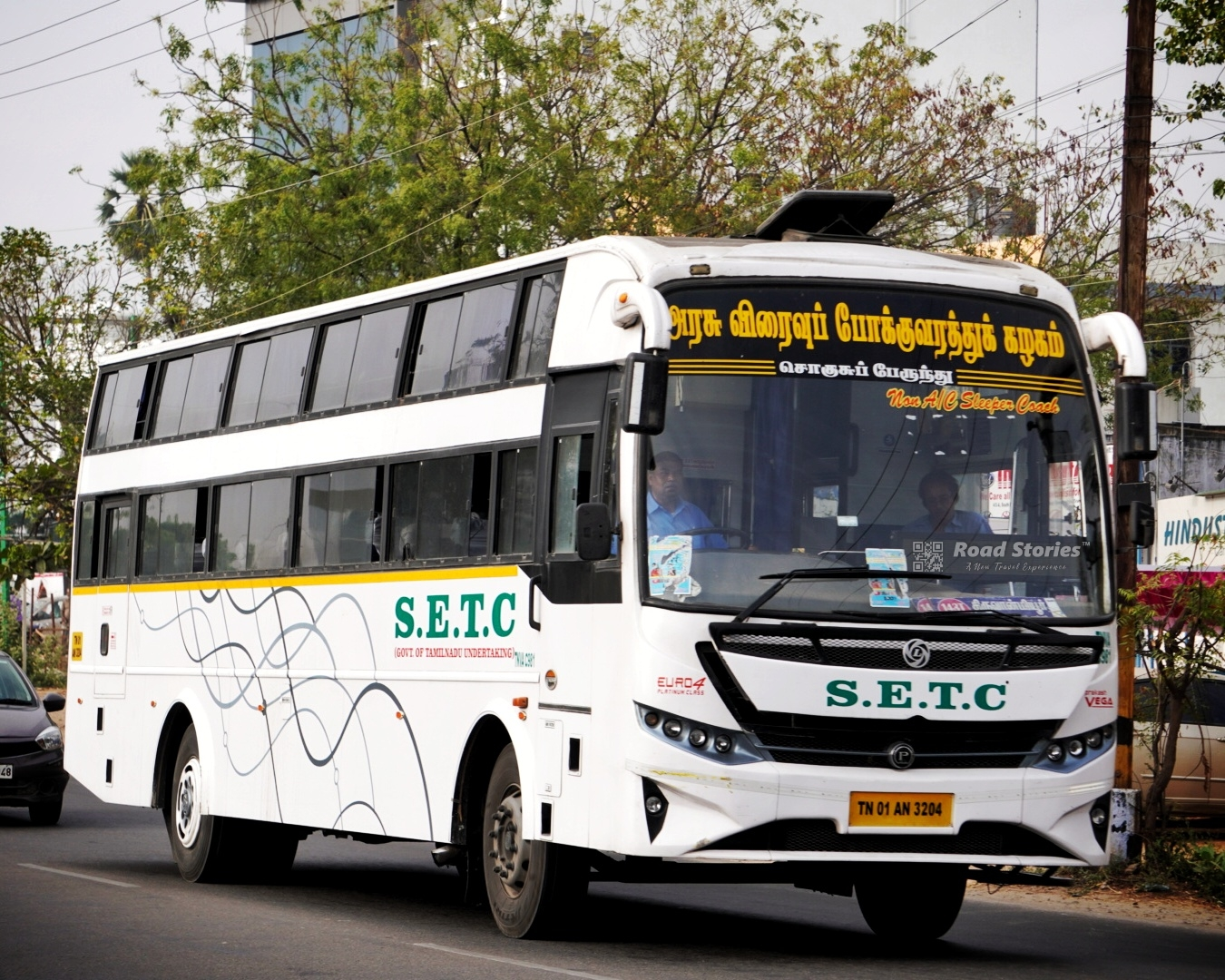
Non-AC Seater cum Sleeper Bus from Tirunelveli to Chennai Thiruvanmiyur.

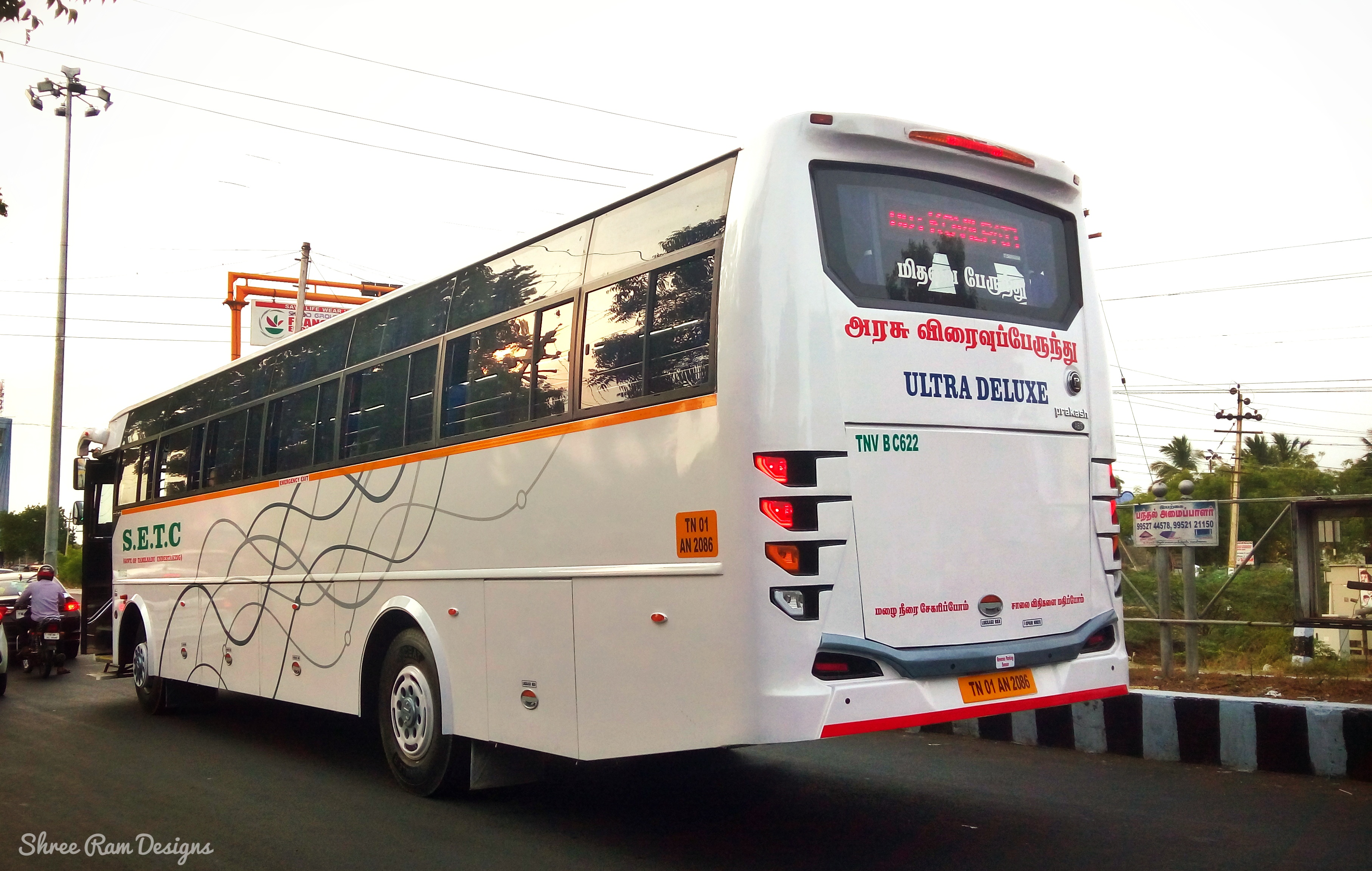
Ultra Deluxe Bus from Tirunelveli to Tirupati.

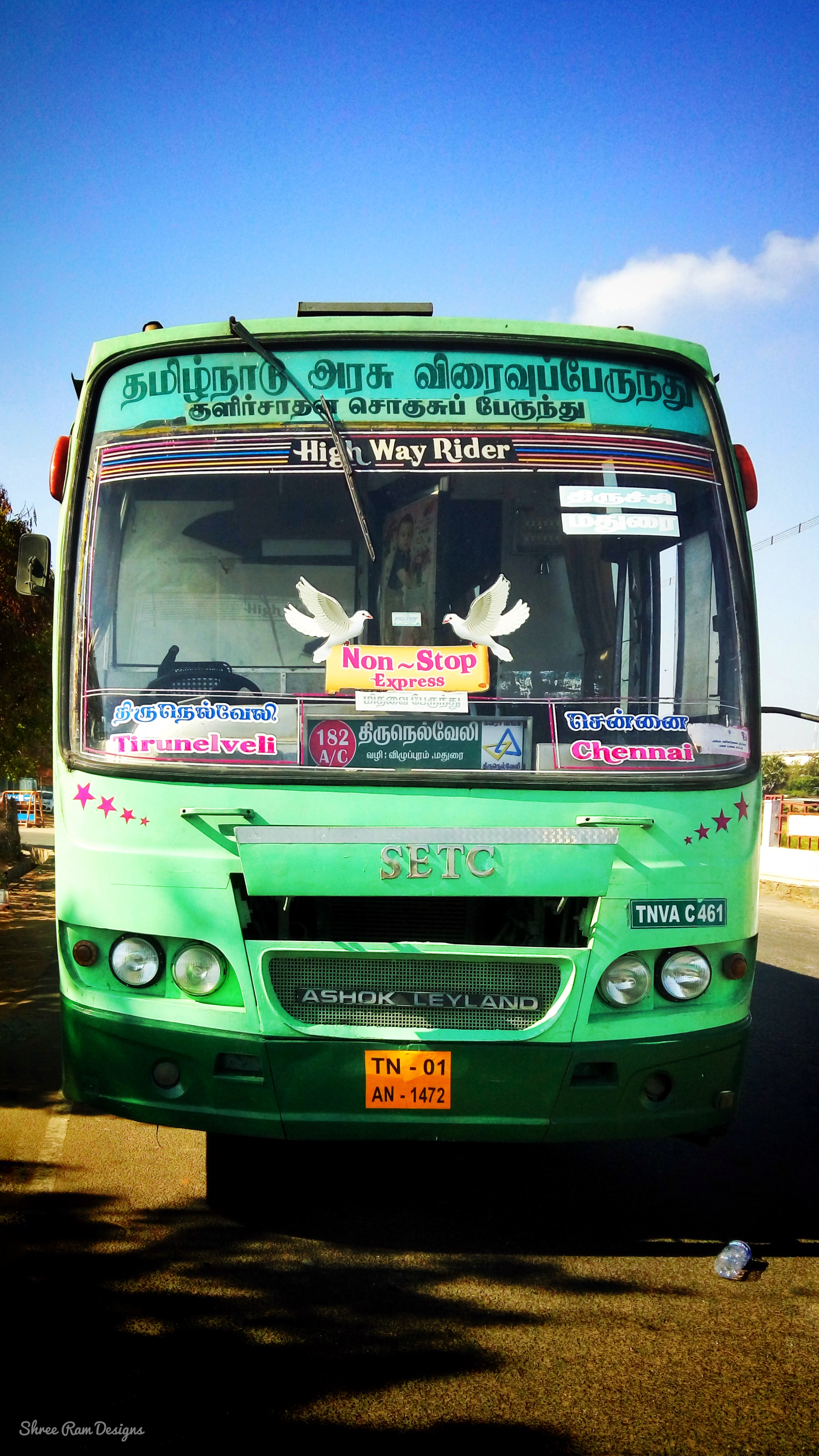
AC seater bus with old green livery from Chennai Koyambedu to Tirunelveli.

== Depot ==
Intrastate
S.No	District		Depot Location	Depot Name	Depot Mark
1	Chennai		Pallavan Salai	Chennai A	CNA
2	Chennai		Kilambakkam	Chennai B	CNB
3	Chennai		Thiruvanmiyur	Chennai C	CNC
4	Krishnagiri		Anthivadi	Hosur	HSR
5	Salem		Angammal Colony	Salem	SLM
6	Coimbatore		Koundampalayam	Coimbatore	CBE
7	Tiruchirappalli		Subramaniyapuram	Tiruchirappalli	TRY
8	Thanjavur		Rajakrisnapuram	Thanjavur	TNJ
9	Thanjavur		Asoor	Kumbakonam	KKM
10	Nagapattinam		Maraimalai Nagar	Nagapattinam	NGP
11	Dindigul		Kurumbapatti	Dindigul	DGL
12	Sivagangai		Nesuwalkan	Karaikudi	KKDI
13	Madurai		Mellur	Madurai	MDU
14	Thoothukudi		Thalamuthu Nagar	Thoothukudi	TCN
15	Tirunelveli		Vannarapettai	Tirunelveli A	TNV A
16	Tirunelveli		KTC Nagar	Tirunelveli B	TNV B
17	Tenkasi		Periapillaivalasai	Sengottai	SHN
18	Kanniyakumari		Meenakshipuram	Nagercoil	NGL
19	Kanniyakumari		South Car Street	Kanniyakumari	KKI
20	Kanniyakumari		Pammam	Marthandam	MTM
Interstate
S.No	State (ST) or Union Territory (UT)	District	Depot Location	Depot Name	Depot Mark
1	Kerala (ST)	Thiruvananthapuram	Thampanoor	Thiruvananthapuram	TVM
2	Puducherry (UT)	Puducherry	Subbarayapillai Chathiram	Puducherry	PDY

== Types of services ==
SETC provides services at fixed rates throughout the year, unlike Omni buses, where fares increase multi-fold during long weekends and festival holidays.

== Services ==
- Ultra Deluxe: It is a non-AC bus service with 2+2 reclining seater seats built on single-axle Ashok Leyland chassis with a 1.BS3 - (#91201D, #F1E3CB) or (#BDF7BD, #1A2A25) 2. BS4 - (#FFFFFF) 3. BS6 - (#AACDAB) available these colors
- Classic: It is a non-AC bus service with 2+2 reclining seater seats and a toilet facility built on single-axle Ashok Leyland chassis with a green livery.
- Non-AC Sleeper: It is a non-AC bus service with 2+1 lower and upper berth sleeper seats built on single-axle Ashok Leyland chassis with a white livery.
- Non-AC Seater Cum Sleeper: It is a non-AC bus service with 2+1 reclining seater seats and 2+1 upper berth sleeper seats built on single-axle Ashok Leyland chassis with a white livery.
- AC Seater: It is an AC bus service with 2+2 reclining seater seats built on single-axle Ashok Leyland chassis with a white or green livery.
- AC Sleeper: It is an AC bus service with 2+1 lower and upper berth sleeper seats built on single-axle Ashok Leyland chassis with a white livery.
- AC Seater cum Sleeper: It is an AC bus service with 2+1 reclining seater seats and 2+1 upper berth sleeper seats built on single-axle Ashok Leyland chassis with a white livery.
- Volvo AC Semi Sleeper: Volvo 9600 multi-axle AC 2+2 semi-sleeper bus was introduced to long-distance routes to enhance transportation services.

== Reservations ==
SETC provides booking and reservations on all of its routes. The reservation period is 60 days before the journey date. There are options to reserve tickets online at as well as at SETC counters at major Bus Stations. The travellers will be notified by SMS with a conductor's mobile number when the passenger list is printed at the originating station.
