= Cheyyur taluk =

Taluk in Tamil Nadu, India

Coordinates: 12°21′N 80°00′E

Cheyyur taluk is a taluk of Chengalpattu district of the Indian state of Tamil Nadu. The headquarters of the taluk is the town of Cheyyur.

== Demographics ==
According to the 2011 census, the taluk of Cheyyur had a population of 203,719 with 102,128 males and 101,591 females. There were 995 women for every 1000 men. The taluk had a literacy rate of 66.68%. Child population in the age group below 6 was 9,587 Males and 9,070 Females.

== Administration ==
The taluk is administered by the Tahsildar office located in Cheyyur. Pin Code is 603302.

== Location ==
Chennai International Airport and Chengalpattu Junction Railway Station serve this area. Visitors can access Cheyyur from Madurakantam, which can be reached by road either from Chennai or Chengalpattu. Private taxis and regular buses are available from Madurakantam to Cheyyur and 7 km from ECR(Ellai amman Kovil-Nainarkuppam), Cheyyur is located 65.7 km distance from its District Main City Kanchipuram Cheyyur.

== History ==
Cheyyur, near chennai is a quaint town situated 29 km from Madurantakam, at Chengalpattu in Kanchipuram District of Tamil Nadu. This tiny hamlet was earlier called Jayamkonda-Cholapuram, Seyyur and Belapuri. In the early days, this area was a dense forest and kept as a reserve for the Chola kings to hunt.

An ancient temple called Cheyyur Shiva Temple, 800 years old, constructed during the reign of the Chola kings, is the major attraction. Near the Shiva Temple is another shrine dedicated to Muruga as an infant. In Tamil 'Sei' denotes 'infant' and the name of the village (Seyyur, later Cheyyur) is derived from this fact.

This taluk was earlier, a part of the Kanchipuram district until the district was bifurcated and a new Chengalpattu district was created.

== List of places in Cheyyur Taluk ==
1. Adayalacheri
2. Agaram
3. Akkinambattu
4. Alambari
5. Amanthankaranai
6. Ammanambakkam
7. Ammanur
8. Anaikattu
9. Andarkuppam
10. Arappedu
11. Arasur
12. Arkadu
13. Atchivilagam
14. Attupattukottapanjai
15. Ayakkunnam
16. Cheyyur
17. Chinnavelikkadu
18. Chittarkadu
19. Chunampet
20. Gangadevankuppam
21. Gurumpirai
22. Illeedu ( main place ) in chunampet
23. Indalur
24. Iraniyasitti
25. Irumbali
26. Isur
27. Kadalur
28. Kadapperi
29. Kadugapattu
30. Kadapakkam
31. Kadukalur
32. Kalkulam
33. Kanattur
34. Kannimangalam
35. karukkamalai
36. Karuppur
37. Kayapakkam
38. Kazhiyur
39. Kesavarajanpettai
40. Kilacheri
41. Kilarkollai
42. Kilmaruvathur
43. Kodapattanam
44. Kodur
45. Kokkaranthangal
46. Kottaikkadu
47. Kulattur
48. Kuvathur
49. Lathur
50. Madavilagam
51. Madayambakkam
52. Makundagiri
53. Malarajakuppam
54. Mambakkam
55. Manapakkam
56. Manikkakuppam
57. Maruderi
58. Melmaruvathur
59. Mudhaliyarkuppam
60. Mugaiyur
61. Murukkanthangal
62. NainarKuppam
63. Nedumaram
64. Nelvoy
65. Nelvoypalayam
66. Nemandam
67. Nerkunam
68. Nerkurapattu
69. Nilamangalam
70. Ottivilagam
71. Odhiyur
72. Pachambakkam
73. Pakkaranai
74. Pakkur
75. Pakkuvancheri
76. Palur
77. Panayadivakkam
78. Paramankeni
79. Parameswaramangalam
80. Parasanallur
81. Parukkai
82. Pavanjur
83. Perambakkam
84. Periyakilakadi
85. Periyavelikkadu
86. Perukkaranai
87. Periyakattupakkam
88. Perumalcheri
89. Perumbakkam
90. Perunthuravu
91. Poigainallur
92. Polambakkam
93. Pondur
94. Ponkunran
95. Poongunam
96. Pooriampakkam
97. Porur
98. Puduppattu
99. Puliyani
100. Punnamai
101. Pupupatti
102. Puraiyur
103. Puranjeri
104. Puttirankottai
105. Sattamangalam
106. Satyamangalam
107. Sembur
108. Sengattur
109. Sevur
110. Sikkinamkuppam
111. Sirukalathur
112. Sirukalathur
113. Sirumayilur
114. Sirunagar
115. Siruvalambakkam
116. Siruvankundram
117. Sittamur
118. Sivadi
119. Sothupakkam
120. Tandalam
121. Thondamanallur
122. Tattampattu
123. Thenpakkam
124. Thandarai
125. Thenpattinam
126. Tiruppurakkovil
127. Tiruvadur
128. Tuduvakanbattu
129. Uludamangalam
130. Vadakkuvayalur
131. Vadappatanam
132. Vanniyanallur
133. Vayalur
134. Vedal
135. Vellankondagaram
136. Velur
137. Vembanur
138. Venmelaguram
139. Veppancheri
140. Vettaikarankuppam
141. Vettamperumbakkam
142. Vilambattu
143. Vilambur
144. Villangadu
145. Virabhogam

== Economic activity ==
MARG Swarnabhoomi-new chennai, an integrated township, with two special economic zones is located in the Cheyyur Taluk. The Government of India has proposed to develop a 4000 MW Ultra Mega Power Plant (UMPP) at Cheyyur .
