= Vadel =

Vadel may refer to:

- Bernard Lamarche-Vadel (1949–2000), French writer, poet, art critic and collector
- Mohamed Bouye Ould Cheikh Mohamed Vadel (born 1977), Mauritanian politician, diplomat, and Member of Parliament
- Philippe Vadel, competitor on the 2011 Open de la Réunion
- Vadel Haidara, karateka competing for Mauritania at the 2019 African Games

== See also ==
- Vedal (disambiguation)
