= Kurumpirai =

Coordinates: 12.435°N 79.871°E

Kurumpirai is a village in the Cheyyur taluk under Polambakkam postal area of Chengalpattu district, Tamil Nadu, India. It is located 92 kilometres from Chennai and 7 kilometres from Melmaruvathur.
