= Tiruvalithayam Tiruvallesvarar Temple =

Shiva temple in Chennai district, Tamil Nadu, India

Tiruvalithayam

- Location in Tamil Nadu

Religion
- Affiliation: Hinduism
- District: Chennai
- Deity: Valleswarar (Shiva); Jagathambikai (Parvathi)

Location
- Location: Padi
- State: Tamil Nadu
- Country: India
- Interactive map of Tiruvalithayam
- Coordinates: 13.0973°N 80.1871°E

Architecture
- Type: Tamilan architecture

Tiruvalithayam Tiruvallesvarar Temple is a temple dedicated to the Hindu deity Shiva, located at Padi, a north-western neighbourhood of Chennai, India. Shiva is worshiped as Thiruvalleswar meaning as Divine (Thiru) God (Eeswar) of Valiyan (Sparrow), referring to Maharishi Bharadwaj, and is represented by the lingam and his consort Parvati is depicted as Jagathambikai. The presiding deity is revered in the 7th-century Tamil Saiva canonical work, the Tevaram, written by Tamil poet saints known as the nayanars and classified as Paadal Petra Sthalam.

The temple is associated with sage Bharadwaja, who worshipped the presiding deity in the form of a sparrow, giving the name Thiruvalithayam to the temple. There are many inscriptions associated with the temple indicating contributions from Cholas. The oldest parts of the present masonry structure were built during the Chola dynasty during the 11th century, while later expansions, are attributed to later periods.

The temple houses a three-tiered gateway tower known as gopuram. The temple has numerous shrines, with those of Tiruvalleswarar and Jagadambiga being the most prominent. The temple complex houses many halls and two precincts. The temple has four daily rituals at various times from 6:30 a.m. to 8 p.m., and five yearly festivals on its calendar. The Brahmotsavam during the Tamil month of Chittirai is the most prominent festival celebrated in the temple. The temple is now maintained and administered by Hindu Religious and Charitable Endowments Department of the Government of Tamil Nadu.

== Legend ==
As per Hindu legend, the sage Bharadwaja worshipped the presiding deity in the form of a Valiyan or sparrow. The place was hence called Valithayam, meaning the one worshipped by a sparrow. Padi historically is referred to the place used to store armory. Shiva has been worshipped by Rama, Bharadwaja, Hanuman, Surya, Chandra, Indra, and Valiyan here. During the medieval times, the place was the site for multiple wars, which razed the structure of the temple. As per Tamil, the Tiruvaipaadi is called Padi, which led to the modern name of the place. The historic name of the place is Thiruvalidayil, which went on to become Thiruvalithayam.

== History ==
The original structure of the temple have been built by The temple is closely associated with Rajaraja Chola III. There are 14 inscriptions from the Chola empire, with the oldest dating back to Tribuvana Chakravarthy Vijayakanda Gopalan who donated multiple jewels to Nachiyar. The inscriptions are counted as 214-28 of 1910. As per the inscriptions, during the regime of Rajaraja III, the temple was in a place called Chintamanipuram. The temple is referred as Ambattur Nadu, Puzhar kottam and Jayamkonda Cholapuram in various inscriptions. The inscriptions denote the presiding deity as Thiruvalithamudaya Nayanar and the Ambal as Thiruveethi Nachiyar. During the period of Rajaraja, a devotee named Chalukya Naranan Yathavarayan of Eastern Chalukyas donated two houses and two gardens to the temple. The other inscriptions indicate gifts in the form of lamps, food and gold to the temple by various devotees and ruling kings.

== Architecture ==
The temple is located in Padi, a neighbourhood in Chennai and the nearest railhead, Korattur is 2.2 km away from the temple. The temple covers an area of close to an 1 acre (0.40 ha). The temple has three prakarams (closed precincts of a temple) and many mandapams (halls). The temple faces east and is entered via a three-tiered pyramidal rajagopuram (gateway tower). The presiding deity in the form of lingam is housed in the sanctum in Gajabrashta shape (sitting pose of an elephant). The attached hall, the ardhamandapa or semi-circled hall measures the same width as the sanctum, while its length is twice the sanctum. The ardhamandapa projects towards the east. The Mukhamandapa or primary hall has a square structure. There are five devakoshtas that cover the exterior walls of the sanctum. The images of Dakshinamurthy and Brahma are the only ones remaining out of the five. There is a separate shrine of Somaskanda in the temple. The presiding deity of the temple is Tiruvallesvarar, housed in the sactum. The consort is Jagadambika is located in a parallel shrine. There is a view point from where both the deities can be viewed. The temple has a separate shrine for Dakshinamurthy (Guru).

== Worship practices and religious importance ==
Thiruvalithayam temple Gajabrastha viamana

Tirugnana Sambandar, the 7th-century Tamil Saivite poet, venerated Thiruvalleswarar, which are compiled in the Tirumurai.

The temple is frequented during Guruvaaram (day of Brihaspati/Guru) or Thursdays by devotees as it is counted as the Guru Stala in Chennai.

== See also ==
- Heritage structures in Chennai
