= Villangadu =

Coordinates: 12°32′53″N 79°41′07″E

Villangadu is a village in Cheyyur taluk, Chengalpattu district, Tamil Nadu, India. It is located 110 km from the state capital of Chennai. The main local language is Tamil. The closest railway station is at Melmaruvathur, 17 km distant.
