= Aksheeswaraswamy Temple, Acharapakkam =

Atcheesva swamy Temple, Acharapakkam
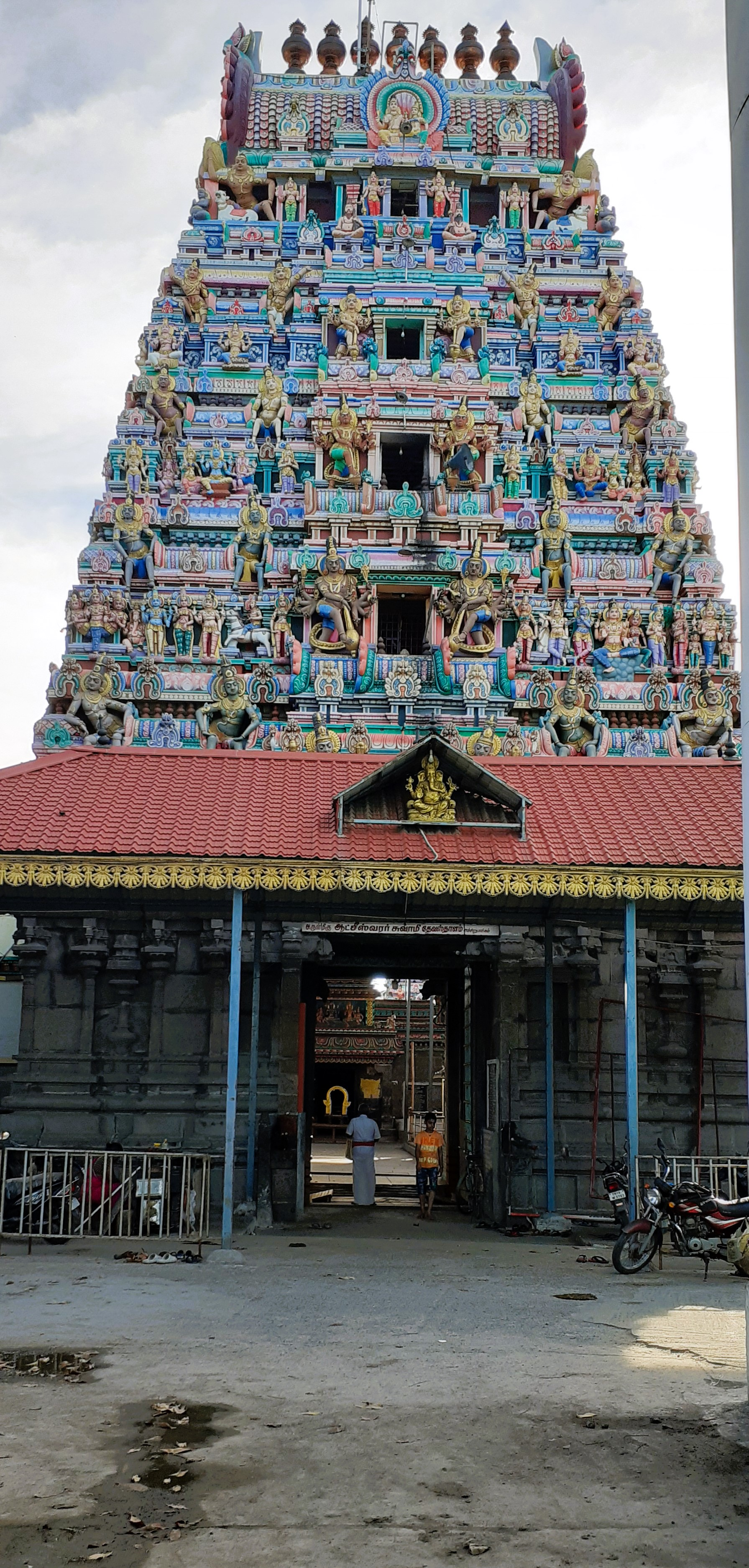

- Location in Tamil Nadu

Religion
- Affiliation: Hinduism
- District: Kanchipuram
- Deity: Aksheeswarar (Shiva) Ilamkili Nayaki (Parvathi)

Location
- Location: Acharapakkam
- State: Tamil Nadu
- Country: India
- Coordinates: 12°24′3.24″N 79°49′3.36″E

Architecture
- Type: Dravidian architecture

Website
- hrce.tn.gov.in/hrcehome/index_temple.php?tid=1755

Atcheesvara Swamy Temple, Acharapakkam is a Hindu temple dedicated to Shiva located in Acharapakkam, Tamil Nadu, India. Shiva is worshiped as Aksheeswaraswamy or Atchikontantar, and is represented by the lingam and his consort Parvati is depicted as Sundaranayagi. The presiding deity is revered in the 7th-century-CE Tamil Saiva canonical work, the Tevaram, written by Tamil saint poets known as the nayanars and classified as Paadal Petra Sthalam. The temples has several inscriptions dated to the period of Kulothunga Chola I (1070-1120 CE).

The most important festival of the temple is the Chittirai Brahmotsavam that lasts ten days during the Tamil month of Chittirai, between April and May. The temple is maintained and administered by the Hindu Religious and Charitable Endowments Department of the Government of Tamil Nadu.

== Legend ==
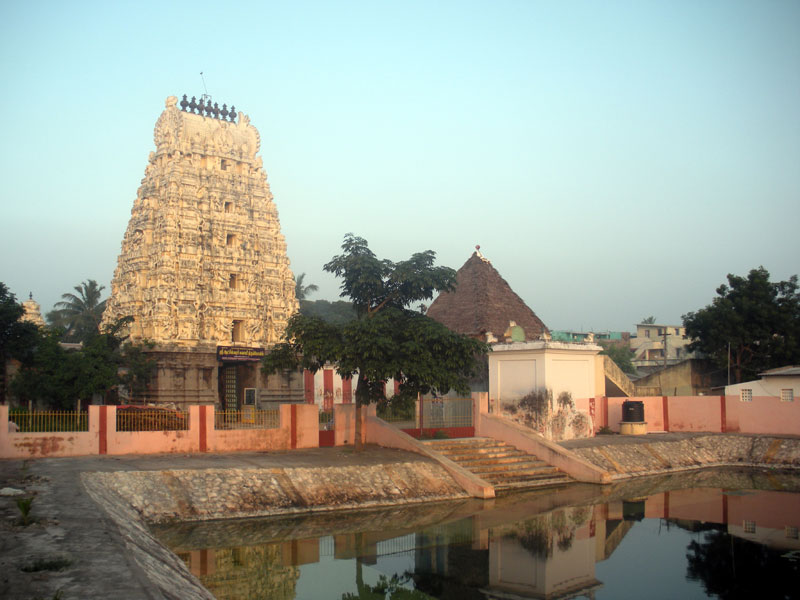
Lake view of the temple

The all-powerful Asuras, Tarakan, Kamalatchan and Vithvan Mali built palaces in gold, silver and iron respectively and were troubling the Devas more frequently. The Devas along with Vishnu and Brahma worshipped Shiva. Shiva personified sky as the roof, ground as base, Surya & Chandra as Wheels, Four Vedas as horses, Merumalai as the Bow, Vasuki as the string and Thirumal himself as the arrow. Brahma was steering the Chariot. Shiva's son Vinayagar (Lord Ganesha) grew angry as he was not a part of the war and broke the caster bolt of the chariot. Shiva gave good deeds to Vinayagar and went ahead winning the Asuras at Thirvathikai. Since the Achu (caster bolt) was broken into pieces (Pakkam), this place is called Achirupakkam. During Tripurasamharam, the killing of Tripurantaka, Shiva forgot to worship Ganesha before setting out for the battle. He realized it and came back to worship Ganesha and went ahead to win the demon. The same legend is associated with Thiruvathigai Veerattaneswarar Temple and Thiruvirkolam Sri Tripuranthaka Swami temple.

As per another legend, sages Gautama and Kanva worshiped Shiva at this place. There is another legend which indicates that a Pandya king found a golden iguana which disappeared under a tree. While digging under the tree, he found a linga. He requested sage Trinedhrathari to build a temple who built two sanctums, one for Uamiyatchivarar and other for Aatcheesvarar.

== History ==
Imitated amphorae have been found in the temple in many excavations in the same context of the imported variety. They are found to be used continuously in Tamil Nadu in 6-7th century mainly in Thondai mandalam, which flourished as a prominent political centre under the Pallavas after the Sangam period. The inscriptions are dated to the period of Kulothunga Chola I (1070-1120 CE) where Shiva is referred as Accukkontu Aruliya Tevar. The inscriptions talk of generous contributions of land, gold and sheep to the temple.

== Architecture ==
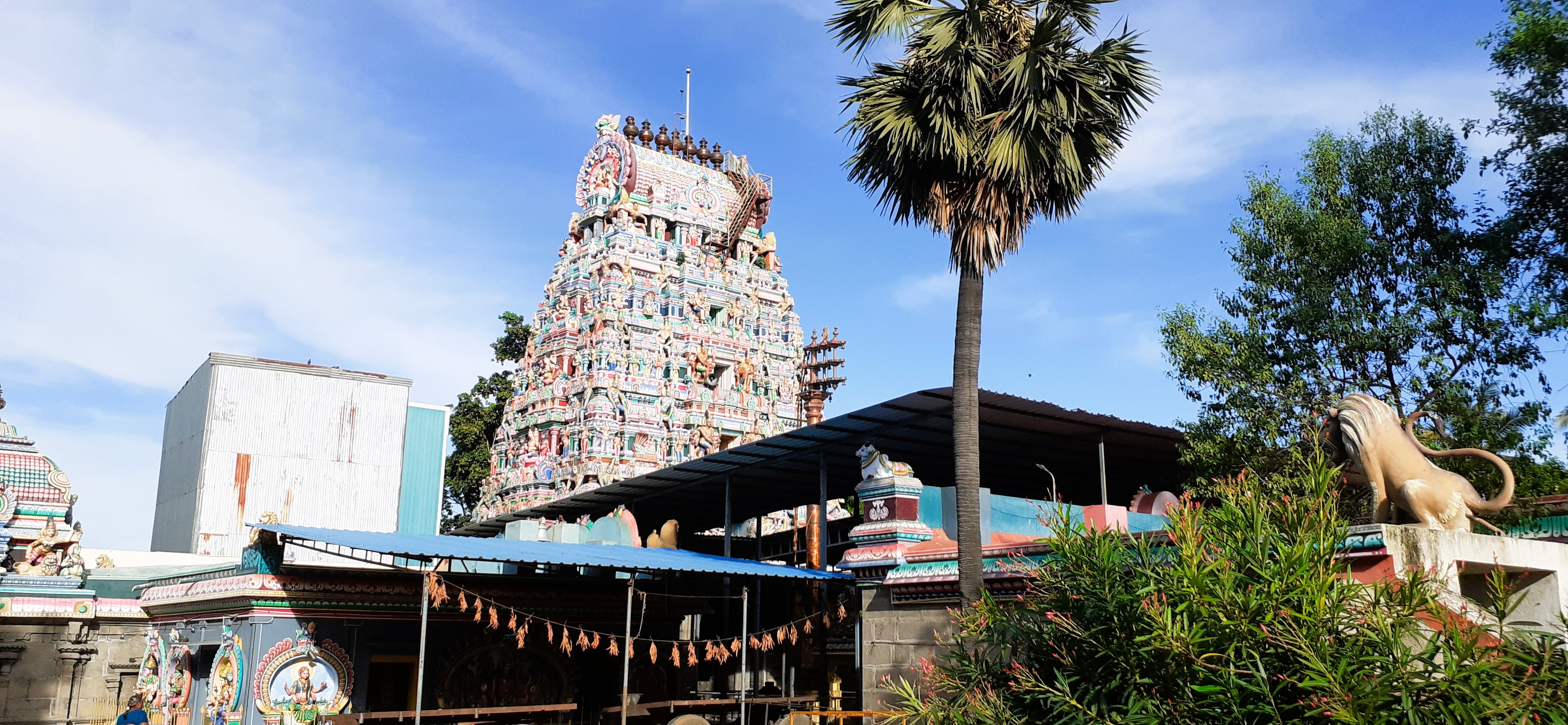
Temple campus

Acharapakkam is located on the 79th km of Trichy-Chennai National Highway (NH45) and 10 km from Maduranthakam. Acharapakkam has its own railhead on the Trichy-Chennai railway line. The temple covers an area of around 1.21 acres (0.49 ha). The temple has a five tiered raja gopuram and a tank in front of it. All the shrines of the temple are enshrined in concentric rectangular walls, with the shrine of Aksheeswaraswamy being the most prominent. The sanctum is set axial to the flagstaff and gopuram. The image of the consort, Sundaranayaki is enshrined in a west facing shrine. There are images of Saraswati, Lakshmi, Saptamatrika and Ayyappa in the first precinct around the sanctum. It is believed that there was a well in front of the sanctum, which can be seen during the times of monsoon even during modern times. The sculptural representation of Karaikkal Ammaiyar walking with her hands and the hunter Kannapa Nayanar sculpted under the image of Somaskanda are noteworthy.

== Worship and festivals ==
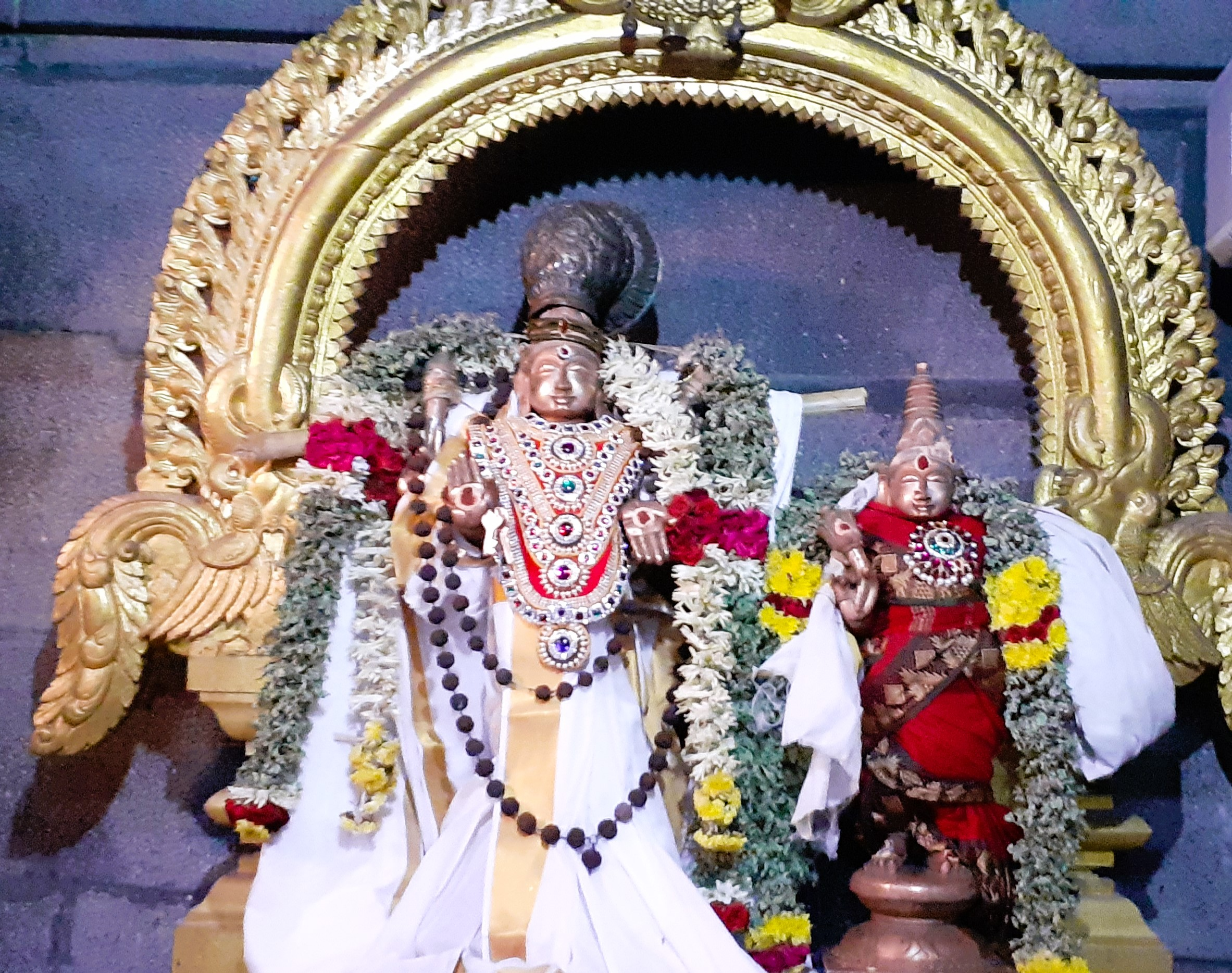
Festive image of the deity

The temple priests perform the pooja (rituals) during festivals and on a daily basis. Like other Shiva temples of Tamil Nadu, the priests belong to the Shaivaite community, a Brahmin sub-caste. The temple rituals are performed four times a day; Ushathkalam at 6:30 a.m., Ucchikalam at 10:00 a.m., Sayarakshai at 6:00 p.m., and Ardha Jamam at 10:00 p.m. Each ritual comprises four steps: abhishekam (sacred bath), alankaram (decoration), naivedyam (food offering) and deepa aradhanai (waving of lamps) for the pedestal of Ekambareswarar. Since it is a Lingam made of sand mound, all the ablution is done only to the pedestal. The worship is held amidst music with nagaswaram (pipe instrument) and tavil (percussion instrument), religious instructions in the Vedas read by priests and prostration by worshippers in front of the temple mast. There are weekly rituals like somavaram and shukravaram, fortnightly rituals like pradosham and monthly festivals like amavasai (new moon day), kiruthigai or on krittika nakshatram, pournami (full moon day) and chaturthi.

The temple celebrates many festivals throughout the year. The most important of these is the Chittirai Brahmotsavam that lasts ten days during the Tamil month of Chittirai, between April and May. There are various processions during the ten days with the festive images of presiding deities of the temple carried in various mounts around the streets of the temple.
