= Vedal, Chengalpattu =

Vedal
- Village
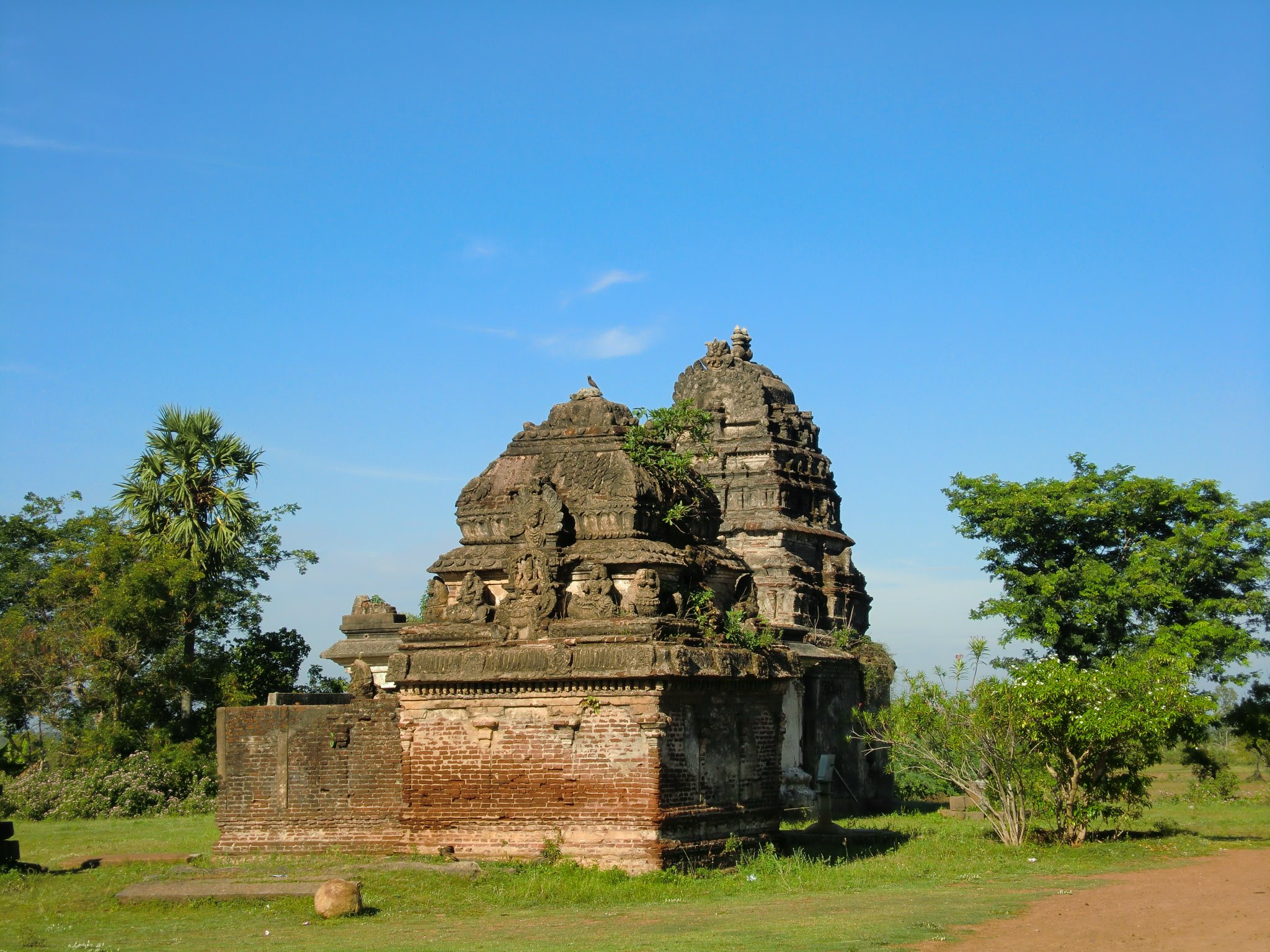
- Shiva temple

- Location in Tamil Nadu, India Vedal (India)
- Coordinates: 12.300853°N 79.961025°E
- Country: India
- State: Tamil Nadu
- District: Chengalpattu

Area
  - Total: 13.4 km^{2} (5.2 sq mi)
- Elevation: 31 m (102 ft)

Population (2021)
  - Total: 2,472
  - Density: 184/km^{2} (478/sq mi)

Languages
  - Official: Tamil
- Time zone: UTC+5:30 (IST)
- PIN: 603304

Vedal is a village in the Cheyyur taluk of the Chengalpattu district of Tamil Nadu, India. In 2011, it had a population of 2,472: 1,221 male and 1,251 female.

== History ==
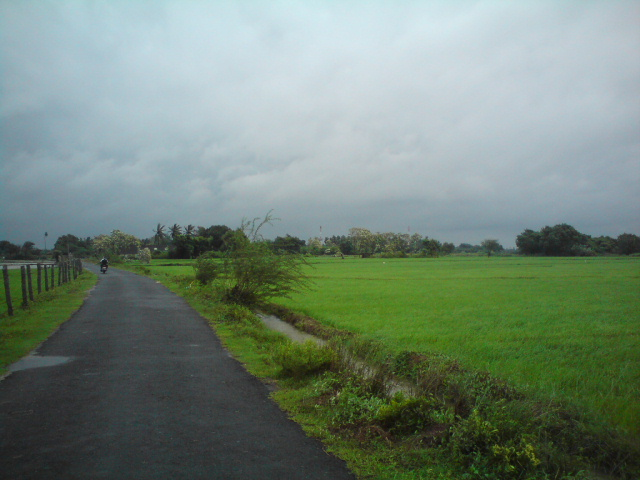
Vedal during Monsoon

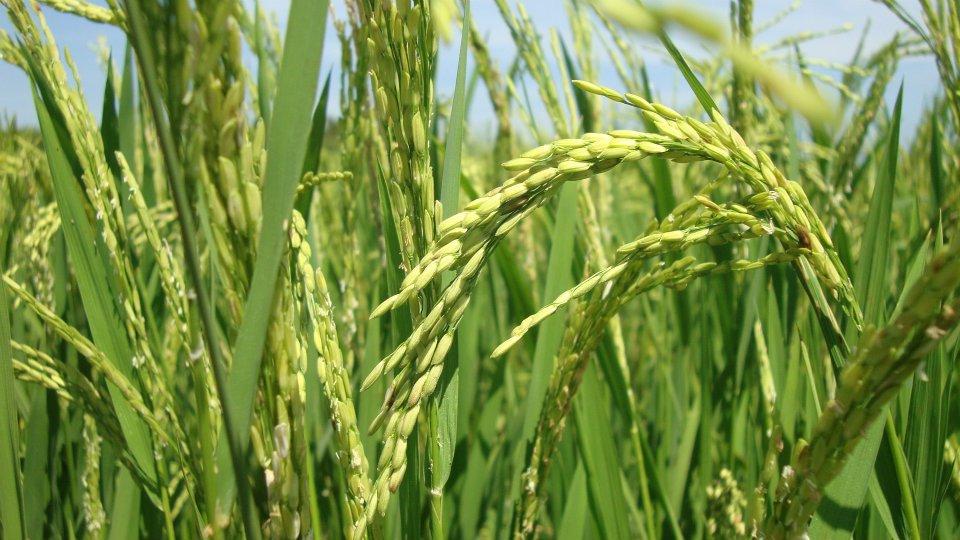
A lush paddy field at Vedal

Vedal was earlier known by the name Chola Kerala Chaturvedi Mangalam. The Vadavamuganeeswarar (or Vadavā-mukhāgnīśvara) temple, built in the Gajapristha style and dedicated to Shiva, is located here. According to INTACH, on stylistic basis, the temple can be dated to the late Pallava or early Chola period (8th-9th century). The Cholas converted several Gajapristha-style brick temples into stone temples, but the Vedal Shiva temple remained a brick temple. The main shrine is dedicated to Vadavamukhagneeswara (Shiva), also known as Vadavayilnayagar ("guardian of the northern entrance"). Another shrine, dedicated to his consort Vasanthanayaki, features two statues of the goddess.

The following Tamil-language inscriptions have been discovered at the temple, and refer to the place as Viḍāl:

- A 994 CE inscription from the reign of Rajaraja I, records gifts of lands by a woman named Kulirkoyil, who also installed the image of the deity Uma-bhattalaraki at the temple.
- A 1012 CE inscription from the reign of Rajendra I, beginning with the king's title Tirumanni valara
- A 1032 CE inscription from the reign of Rajendra I records by Tuttan Viratungan; it refers to the place as Śōla-kērla-chaturvēdi-maṅgalam alias Vidal.
- A 1043 CE inscription from the reign of Rajendra I an undertaking by the local assembly (maha-sabha) to provide food offerings and lamps to the deity Advallar with help of a donation from Malaiya-kulantakapperiyariaiyan
- Two c. 11th century inscriptions, dated to the 16th regnal year of king Para-kesari-varman (a Chola title), record gifts of land by Arangan Namiyandani (or Namiyanandi)
- Another 11th century inscription, records a land grant to support organization of festivals at Vidal
- Three other 11th century inscriptions record the gift of a lamp, a land grant to maintain a lamp, and a gift of gold to maintain the lamp

In 2008, Vedal was selected as a location for one of the Ultra Mega Power Projects, but local residents raised ecological objections to the construction of a new coal power plant. Opponents pointed to the presence of several water retention basins that would be affected by pollution from the project, noting that Vedal's tank was over 1,000 years old. The project was suspended in December 2019, primarily over cost concerns. The government instructed the developers they may reapply for clearance, but that a new ecological impact study would be needed, along with opportunities for public comment.

== Demographics ==
Population as of the 2011 census
Category	Population
Male	1,221
Female	1,251
Total	2,472
