= Vedal =

Vedal may refer to:

== People and fictional characters ==
- Vedal, also known as Vedal987, creator of Neuro-sama
- Vedal, fictional character in Kaun Hai?

== Villages in Tamil Nadu, India ==
- Vedal, Chengalpattu
- Vedal, Ranipet
- Vedal, Tiruvannamalai

== See also ==
- Vadal (disambiguation)
- Vadel (disambiguation)
- Vidal (disambiguation)
