= Acharapakkam =

- Town
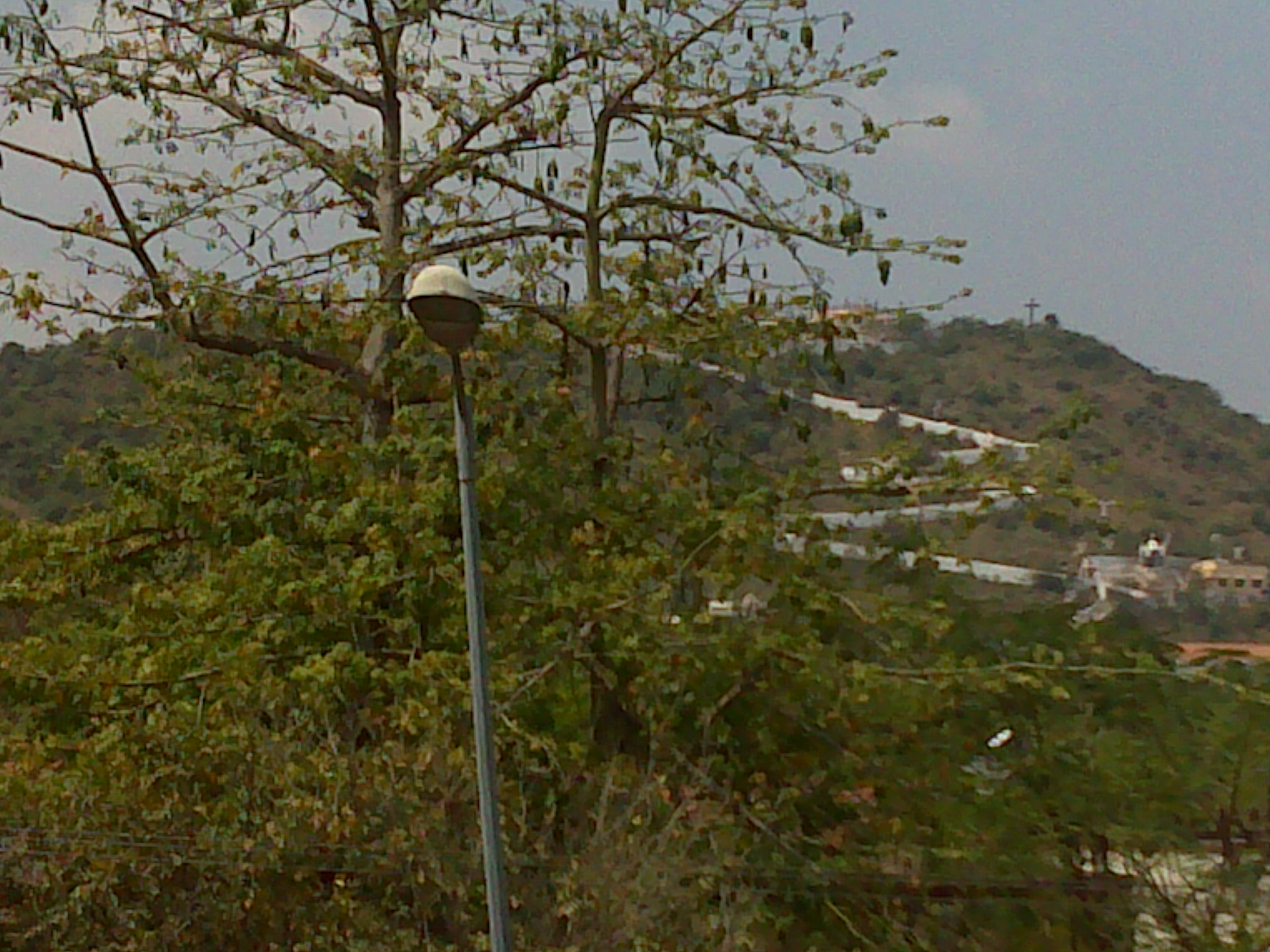
- Acharapakkam hill along NH45

- Location in Tamil Nadu, India
- Coordinates: 12.3959°N 79.8091°E
- Country: India
- State: Tamil Nadu
- District: Chengalpattu
- Metro: Chennai

Population (2016)
  - Total: 30,000

Languages
  - Official: Tamil
- Time zone: UTC+5:30 (IST)
- PIN: 603301
- Telephone code: 91-44
- Vehicle registration: TN-19

Acharapakkam is a panchayat town in the Chengalpattu district in the Indian state of Tamil Nadu. It is famous for its ancient Shiva temple, namely Aksheeswaraswamy Temple which is one of the Tevaram temples. Acharapakkam is about 96km south-west from Chennai, which is now included with the Chennai Metropolitan Area limits. Aksheeswaraswamy Temple is dedicated to Lord Shiva located near Acharapakkam, Tamil Nadu, India. The temple is praised in the hymns of Saint Tirugnanasambandar. This is the 29th shrine in the Thondai region praised in Thevaram hymns. This temple is around 1000–2000 years old. It is believed that Aksheeswaraswamy Temple is associated with the legend of Tripurasura (related to the legend associated with Tiruvatikai Veerattaanam). Legends state that when Lord Shiva was travelling in his chariot to destroy the Tripurasura, the axle of the chariot broke in this village into two pieces. Lord Shiva recollected that he didn't pray to Lord Ganesha before setting out for travel.

It is also said that a Pandya King, who was on his way to bring soil from the Ganges River's banks for construction of a dam on a local river nearby happened to pass through this village in his chariot. While passing, the axle of his chariot is also said to have broken in this very village in to two pieces. Hence the name of this village came to being as Achu Iru Paagam, which means "Axle into two pieces." Later this name eventually became Achirupakkam and then to Acharapakkam.

The town is also famous for the Mazhai Malai Madha Church, which is visited by thousands of Christians every year. The church is popular with people of other faiths too. According to locals, in 1969, as severe drought prevailed in the region, a car procession was organised for Mother Mary at the Acharapakkam Hill and prayers were offered. But astonishingly, even before the car procession ended, the place saw a heavy downpour, with thunder and lightning. Mother Mary was honored by locals as 'Mazhai Malai Madha' (Mountain Rain Mary) and a grotto was built at the place. The shrine we see today is built at the same spot.

The church has become very popular with people of all faiths and has become a tourist attraction. For Christian devotees, walking up the stairs, which leads to the top of a small hillock is considered a 'must-do' activity.

== Location ==
Acharapakkam is located along the busy Chennai-Tuticorin National Highway (NH32) or GST Road, 3 km from the famous temple town Melmaruvathur. Taluk Headquarters is in Madurantakam.

The police station in Acharapakkam is one of the oldest police stations in Tamil Nadu, witnessing over 100 years of its existence.

== Demographics ==
As of the India census, Acharapakkam had a population of 9013. Males and females each have an equal percentage of the population. Its literacy rate of almost 73% is higher than the national average of 59.5%; with 56% of the males and 44% of females being literate. 10% of the population is under 6 years of age.

== Transportation ==
As Acharapakkam lies on the busy NH45, this place is easily reachable from any part of the state. TNSTC-VPM operates buses between Acharapakkam and major parts of the district, and also to some deep interior villages. Although long-distance buses (SETC and others) don't stop at Acharapakkam, due to its proximity to Melmaruvathur, one can easily access Acharapakkam by alighting at Melmaruvathur. Both government and private buses serve Acharapakkam.

== Politics ==
Acharapakkam (SC) (State Assembly Constituency) is not a constituency at present, but is part of Chengalpattu (Lok Sabha constituency). Currently Kancheepuram Lok Sabha Constituency
