= ACMEC =

Adhiparasakthi Charitable, Medical, Educational and Cultural Trust is a charitable organization in Tamil Nadu, India. It was founded in 1978 in Melmaruvathur by Bangaru Adigalar; it funds colleges and a hospital.
