= Adhiparasakthi Siddhar Peetam =

Hindu temple in Melmaruvathur, India

Coordinates: 12.431424°N 79.831378°E

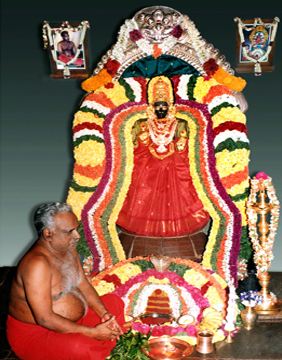
Adhiparasakthi Siddhar Peetam

Arulmigu Adhiparasakthi Siddhar Peetam is a Hindu temple in Melmaruvathur, approximately 92 km from Chennai (Formerly known as Madras) in the southern state of Tamil Nadu, India. Tamil Nadu is the place where 21 Siddhars (saints), men as well as women from different religions, had their Jeeva-Samadhis (meaning, the Siddhars left their human forms behind, yet still alive as holy spirits). The divine mother Adhi Parashakti transmigrates into Arulthiru Bangaru Adigalar in Adiparashakti Siddhar Peetam.

== History ==
Where the current temple's sanctum sanctorum stands today, there was nothing but a neem tree in the 1960s. Unlike other neem trees, which bear bitter tasting fruit, this tree secreted and dripped a sweet nectar. Residents of that village found that they had an urge in their mind to taste this nectar whenever they passed by this tree. Since many passers got cured of their illnesses and diseases after tasting this nectar, the word spread swiftly to the entire village and its neighborhoods. It became customary for these villagers to take a drop of this nectar to ailing friends and relatives. They treated this as a medicinal tree and protected it from grazing cattle and wood cutters.

In 1966, a severe storm uprooted this neem tree, which exposed the Swayambu underneath, a self emerging, naturally formed oval shaped object carved of rock, to the villagers for the first time. People built a small hut on top of this Swayambu and started conducting poojas to it.

This place is known as Siddhar Peetam (Siddhar in Tamil language means enlightened or evolved souls. Peetam means throne. Thus Siddhar Peetam means The Throne of Evolved Souls or Great Spiritual Masters/Gurus) where 21 Siddhars are laid in Jeeva Samaadhi.

Swayambu alone was worshipped for many years. The idol of Mother Adi Parashakti was installed later in the sanctum sanctorum on the 25th of November, 1977. The idol of the beautiful goddess is three feet tall, seated on a thousand-petalled lotus seat, with her right leg folded and left leg resting on the lotus petals. The thousand petal lotus has significance in meditation. In this idol form, she holds the bud of a lotus in her right hand, the mudhra (sign) of knowledge in her left. Her hair is plaited and knotted upwards like a crown.

== Principles of the Siddhar Peetam ==
The basic tenet of Melmaruvathur Adhiparasakthi Siddhar Peetam is One Mother, One Humanity, meaning that the whole human race is one and all human beings who inhabit this vast earth are children of the Mother Goddess. Amma has revolutionized the concept of spirituality, entering the sanctum sanctorum, and performing the daily rituals and prayers to the Mother Adhiparasakthi. The main objective for which the Siddhar Peetam strives for is the Sakthi movement. That is, the whole of humanity is born of one omnipotent Mother, and hence the whole humanity is one, should be upheld, and each and everyone's grievances should be removed.

At the Melmaruvathur Adhiparasakthi Siddhar Peetam, Adigalar is associated with the practice of Arulvakku (oracle). Devotees believe that during Arulvakku, Adhiparasakthi speaks to them through Adigalar. The practice is regarded by devotees as a significant feature of worship at the Siddhar Peetam.

Arul Thiru Bangaru Adigalar is called by his devotees as AMMA (means Mother), here in Siddhar Peetam whatever "AMMA" says is the law and it is administered under the guidance of 'AMMA' which is a divine administration. In Melmaruvathur, women are permitted to perform poojas in the sanctum sanctorum.

== The layout of the Temple is as follows ==
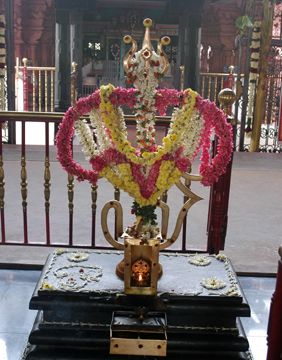
OM Sakthi Stage

The Om Sakthi Stage at the entrance. On the highway in front of the Siddhar Peetam there is a stage with the mantra of "OmSakthi" on it. Soolam (Trishul - Trident) of the Mother is erected on this stage. The devotees entering the Peetam to worship the Mother, first go round this stage thrice and then enter the Peetam. Since the AdhiParaSakthi is the Mother Origin of everything, there is no Nava Grahas (9 Planets) that are usually found in all other Hindu Temples. The Mother has ascertained, "Those who surrender to me, need not pray to the planetary Lords. They are my officers who carry out the work of implementing my Law of Karma. The Sanctum Sanctorum faces the entrance where OM Sakthi stage is located. Inside this sanctorum is the Swayambu and Mother's idol. The sanctorum is only about 10X10 feet room."

== Putrumandapam ==
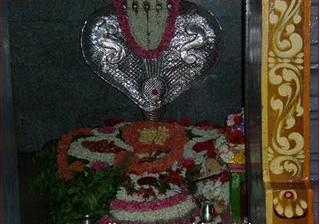
Putrumandapam

The Mother in order to keep blessing people at all times, dwells in the snake pit (putrumandapam) in the form of a cobra. The Mother appears before the devotees who stay in the mandapam (Hall) at nights, in the form of a snake till this day. It is the putrumandapam where the Mother gives her Oracle.

== Saptha Kanniyar ==
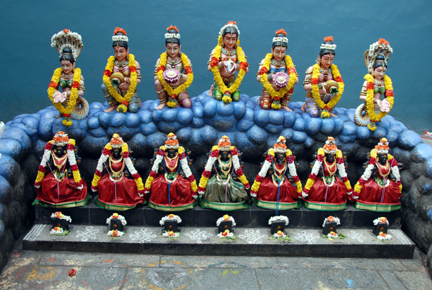
Saptha Kanniyar Kovil

Saptha Kanniyar Kovil (The Temple of Seven Virgins) to the right of putrumandapam. Normally the temple of the virgins will never have a roof. So also this temple of the virgins, with wall on four sides has no roof. To ascertain the fact that all are her children and that She doesn't differentiate between any of us, the Mother ordained the local Harijans (considered to be low caste people in India) to construct the Saptha Kanniyar (Saptha means seven and Kanni means virgin. Kanniyar is plural for virgins) worship center within the Temple.

In 1974, the Saptha (Seven) Kanni (Virgin Angels) Sannidhi (Temple) was consecrated in Melmaruvathur Adhiparasakthi Siddhar Peetam, Tamil Nadu, India. As with everything else in Melmaruvathur, Saptha Kanniyar (Virgin Mothers) and their Temple is also unique, transcends the traditional and emphasizes the fundamental Universal Nature of these Mothers. Seven Angels are Saptha Matre, Saptha Matrikas, Saptha Kannikas, etc. Also, some of these sources attempt to differentiate between Matrikas, Matre and Virgin Angels, although in reality, they are one and the same.

In all Hindu scripts and Devi Mahatmyam, one will note that Saptha Kannikas are mentioned as Parivaara Devataas of Aadhi paraa shakti. Among the millions of Parivaara Devataas, these Seven Virgin Mothers carry special place in Aadhi para shakti as depicted in Sri Yantra (Sri Chakra). The seven nodes in the middle line of the First Enclosure (Prathama Aavaranaa) are occupied by the Saptha Kannikas, namely Brahmi, Mahe’shwari, Kowmaari, Vaishnavi, Vaaraahi, Indraani, and Chaamundi . The eighth node is occupied by Mahalakshmi. Traditionally, all the Hindu Temples in villages and rural areas of India, these seven virgin mothers are consecrated as seven stones and worshipped as formless. These shrines are often called “Kanni Kovil” meaning “Virgin Temples”.

== Special Features ==
- With a view to show divine miracles, supernatural and spiritual powers and to talk to common man, the Adhi parasakthi had appeared in the form of Arul thiru, Bangaru Adigalar at Melmaruvathur.
- Melmaruvathur is the adobe of 21 Siddhas who are said to be in Jeeva Samathi here.
- All people irrespective of caste, creed, community or religion, can go inside sanctum sanctorum and worship the goddess.
- Ladies also can go inside sanctorum for worshipping and perform pooja.
- During Adipooram, Adigalar is doing Angaprathatchanam in the temple.
- During 1st day of Navarathiri, Adigalar lights the holy Agandam.
- For the welfare and betterment of the family and wipe out sins, lights are lit in the lime fruits at Nagapeetam.
- In this temple. Angaprathatchanam is considered to be the best way of showing Divinity for one's welfare.
- Angaprathatchanam during Adipooram, and worshipping holy agandam in Navarathiri are considered best for Papa Vimochanam.
- During Adipooram people themselves can do Ablution (Abishekam) to Swayambu with milk.
- People are allowed to do Poojas according to their religious practice in this temple.
- Agama, silpa Rules are not followed in this peetam. What Adigalar dictates is veda and practice and a Divine Administration is held in this temple.
- Tamil Mandras, velvis and kalasa, vilakku Poojas are conducted periodically.
- There is a separate sanctum for Adarvana Badrakali who expels all evil activities and removes all enchantment.
- What all-religious practices exist in books brought in to practice in this temple.
- Poor feeling, supplying clothing and industrial equipments to down trodden, free marriages to poor, help to widows, giving aid, wheel chairs, tricycles to disabled etc. are being done on important festivals towards socio economic service to the community.
- Spiritual conferences are held for world peace, thus getting wealth from those who possess and distribute it to those who need it.
- Sakthi Peetams and Mandrams are started throughout the world to spread spirituality and also to do social works. There are Sakthi Peetams all over world and over 5000 Mandrams in India, Malaysia, Sri Lanka, Singapore, Nigeria, America, Zambia, France, etc.
- All of these are mainly based on Adigalar's Arulvakku only.
- Arul Vakku is the prime capital, Adigalar is the prime sustainer for this organization.
- In this place, who ever do meditations 108 times with proper fasting & carry Irumudi 9 times are not affected with bad evils.

== Festivals at Siddhar Peetam ==
1. Thaipoosam - January
2. His Holiness’ Birthday - 3 March
3. Ugadi - April
4. Tamil New Year's Day - April
5. Chitra Pournami - April
6. Adi pooram - August
7. Navarathri - October
8. All Full Moon Days and New Moon days throughout the Calendar Year

== The Daily Routine ==
The people who serve in the Siddhar Peetam are normally the devotees clad in red dress. They come from outstations, render services and return home. To serve at the sanctum sanctorum, each one of the weekly worshipping centers (mandrams) is allotted a day and informed sufficiently early. Accordingly, all mandrams compete with one another in rendering the best service. Every day Abhishekam at the sanctum sanctorum takes place at 4:00 am. After this, idol of the Mother is decorated followed by aradhana. The Mother's blessed prasadam (proceeding of the prayer) is then offered to the devotees. Everyday around 11:00 AM free food is distributed to all visiting devotees. Besides, on the new moon and full moon days, Adigalaar is given a special welcome and the free food distribution is done on a large scale.
