= Kazhiyur =

Coordinates: 12.6543°N 79.5746°E

Kazhiyur or Kaliyur is a village in the Cheyyur taluk of the Chengalpattu district in the Tamil Nadu state of India. It is located on the way from Kancheepuram to Cheyyar. Chengalpattu is the district headquarters.

== Demographics ==
The clans who have this small village as their place of origin have the name of the village added to their name as their last name. This village houses the temple of "Adhi Kesava Perumal". Its Postal Index Number is 604407.
