= Vidal (disambiguation) =

Vidal is a surname and given name.

Vidal may also refer to:

== Places ==
- Parque Vidal, Santa Clara, Cuba
- Saint-Vidal, France
- Valle Vidal, New Mexico, United States
- Vidal, California, United States
- Vidal Ramos, Brazil
- Vidal Rock, near Greenwich Island, South Shetland Islands
- Vidal Valley, California, United States

== Other uses ==
- HMS Vidal, a Royal Navy survey ship
- Vidal blanc, a white wine grape
- Maria Vidal, music album
