= Bangaru Adigalar =

South Indian spiritual guru (1941–2023)

Personal life
- Born: 3 March 1941 Melmaruvathur, Madras Province, British India
- Died: 19 October 2023 (aged 82) Melmaruvathur, Tamil Nadu, India

Religious life
- Religion: Hinduism

Bangaru Adigalar (3 March 1941 – 19 October 2023) was an Indian spiritual guru and the president of the Adiparasakthi Charitable Medical Educational and Cultural Trust. He was called "Amma", meaning mother in Tamil, by his followers and devotees of the Adhiparasakthi temple.

Adigalar was believed by his followers to be the Poorna Avatar (holding all 16 qualities of an Avatar) as well as the incarnation of the supreme power Adhiparasakthi. Adigalar treated his followers equally, regardless of gender, caste, or religion.

== Income tax raid ==
Adigalar's educational institutions, his residences, and trust offices were raided by income tax officials on 2 July 2010. The search began at 11.30 a.m. and lasted until 4:00 a.m. the next day. ₹9 crore (equivalent to ₹20 crore or US$2.1 million in 2023) was confiscated from Adigalar's home, while ₹3 crore (equivalent to ₹6.7 crore or US$700,000 in 2023) was found at his trust offices. His son Anbazhagan's house was raided and ₹40 lakh (equivalent to ₹90 lakh or US$93,000 in 2023) and gold jewellery was found.

== Death ==
Bangaru Adigalar died peacefully in Melmaruvathur, on 19 October 2023, at the age of 82.

== Awards ==
The Government of India awarded him Padma Shri in 2019 for his service to humanity.
