= Maduranthakam Lake =

- Maduranthakam Aeri
- Location within Tamil Nadu Location within India
- Location: Maduranthakam, Chengalpattu district, Tamil Nadu, India
- Coordinates: 12°31′30″N 79°52′30″E
- Type: Artificial lake
- Basin countries: India
- Surface area: 2,400 acres (970 ha)
- Settlements: Maduranthakam

Maduranthakam Lake or Maduranthakam Aeri, is a lake spread over 2400 acres in Maduranthakam, Chengalpattu district, Tamil Nadu, India.

== Geography ==
Maduranthakam aeri is an artificial lake and is the largest lake in the district of Chengalpattu and second largest lake in the state of Tamil Nadu. This lake with a live storage capacity of 16.08 MCM (million cubic meters) as on 2005 has been mentioned in the Government records as one of the oldest impounded lakes in the country since 1798

After decades of siltation that reduced its storage capacity by 24%, a major restoration project worth ₹163 crore was undertaken. As of early 2026, the project is nearly complete, with storage capacity increased by 45%—from 694 million cubic feet (mcft) to 1,000 mcft. Modern automated gates have been installed for efficient water management. The Water Resources Department confirmed the lake is on track to be fully functional by February 2026. [4]

== See also ==
Rejuvenation efforts at Madurantakam lake after many decades https://www.thehindu.com/news/national/tamil-nadu/rejuvenation-efforts-on-at-madurantakam-lake-after-many-decades/article65844111.ece

- Water management in Chennai
