= Madurantakam railway station =

Railway station in Tamil Nadu, India

Mathuranthakam
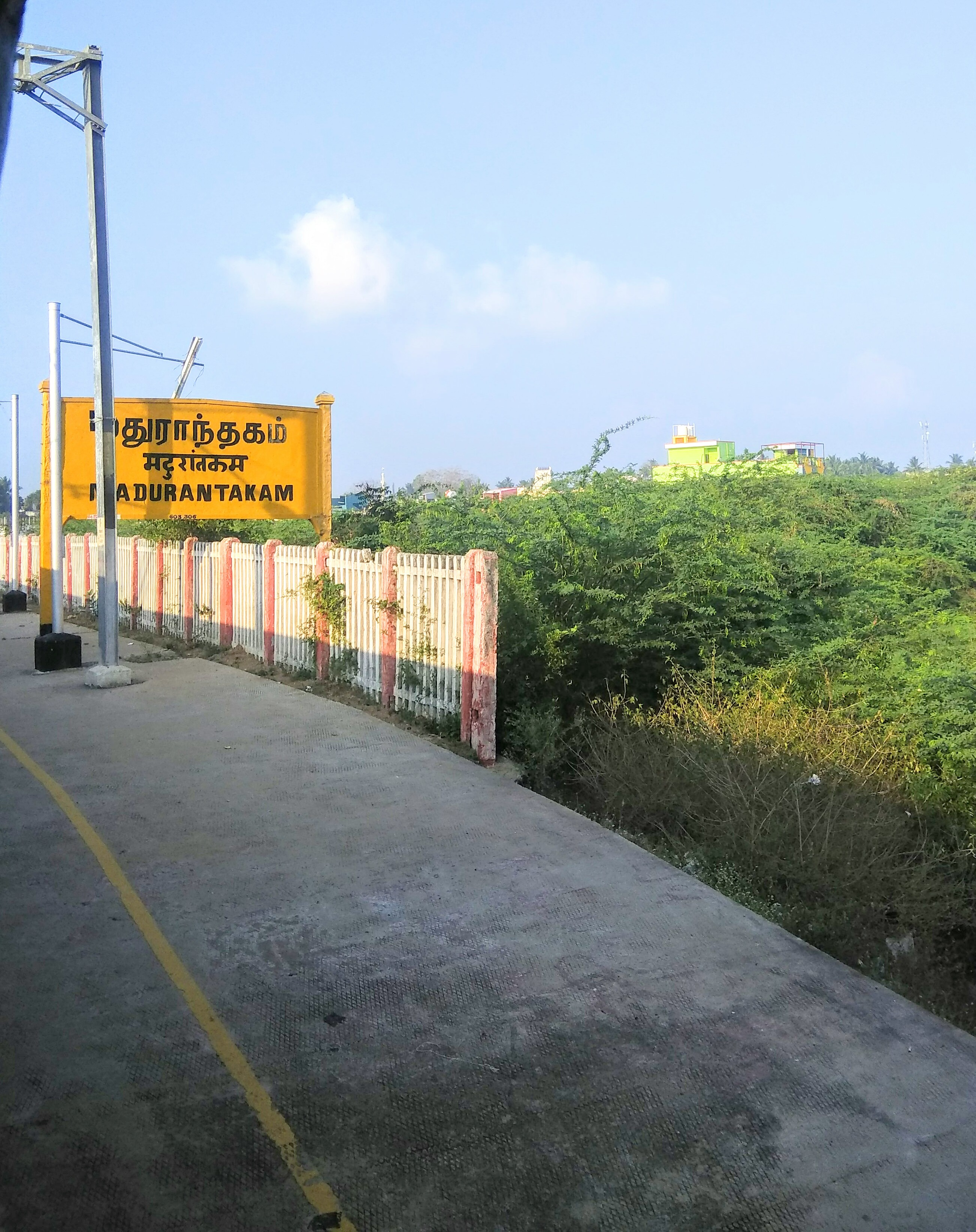

General information
- Location: SH 117, Maduranthakam, Chengalpattu district, Tamil Nadu; India
- Coordinates: 12.5044°N 79.8933°E
- Elevation: 31 metres (102 ft)
- System: Indian Railways station
- Owner: Indian Railways
- Operator: Southern Railway zone
- Line: Chennai–Viluppuram line
- Platforms: 3
- Tracks: 2
- Connections: Auto rickshaw, Taxi

Construction
- Structure type: Standard (on-ground station)
- Parking: Yes

Other information
- Status: Functioning
- Station code: MMK
- Zone(s): Southern Railway zone
- Division(s): Chennai

Services
Preceding station	Chennai Suburban	Following station
Karunguzhi towards Chengalpattu Junction, Tambaram or Chennai Beach	South Line	Pakkam towards Villupuram Junction
Route map
Chennai Beach — Villupuram
Location

Madurantakam railway station (station code: MMK) is an NSG–6 category Indian railway station in Chennai railway division of Southern Railway zone. It serves Madurantakam, located in Chengalpattu district of the Indian state of Tamil Nadu.

All passenger and local trains have a halt at the station while only a few express trains halt here, with most of the remainder express services halting at Melmaruvathur railway station instead, which is situated 10 kilometres (6.2 mi) away and is also within Madurantakam taluk.
