= Eri-Katha Ramar Temple =

Hindu temple in Tamil Nadu, India

Yeri Katha Ramar Temple
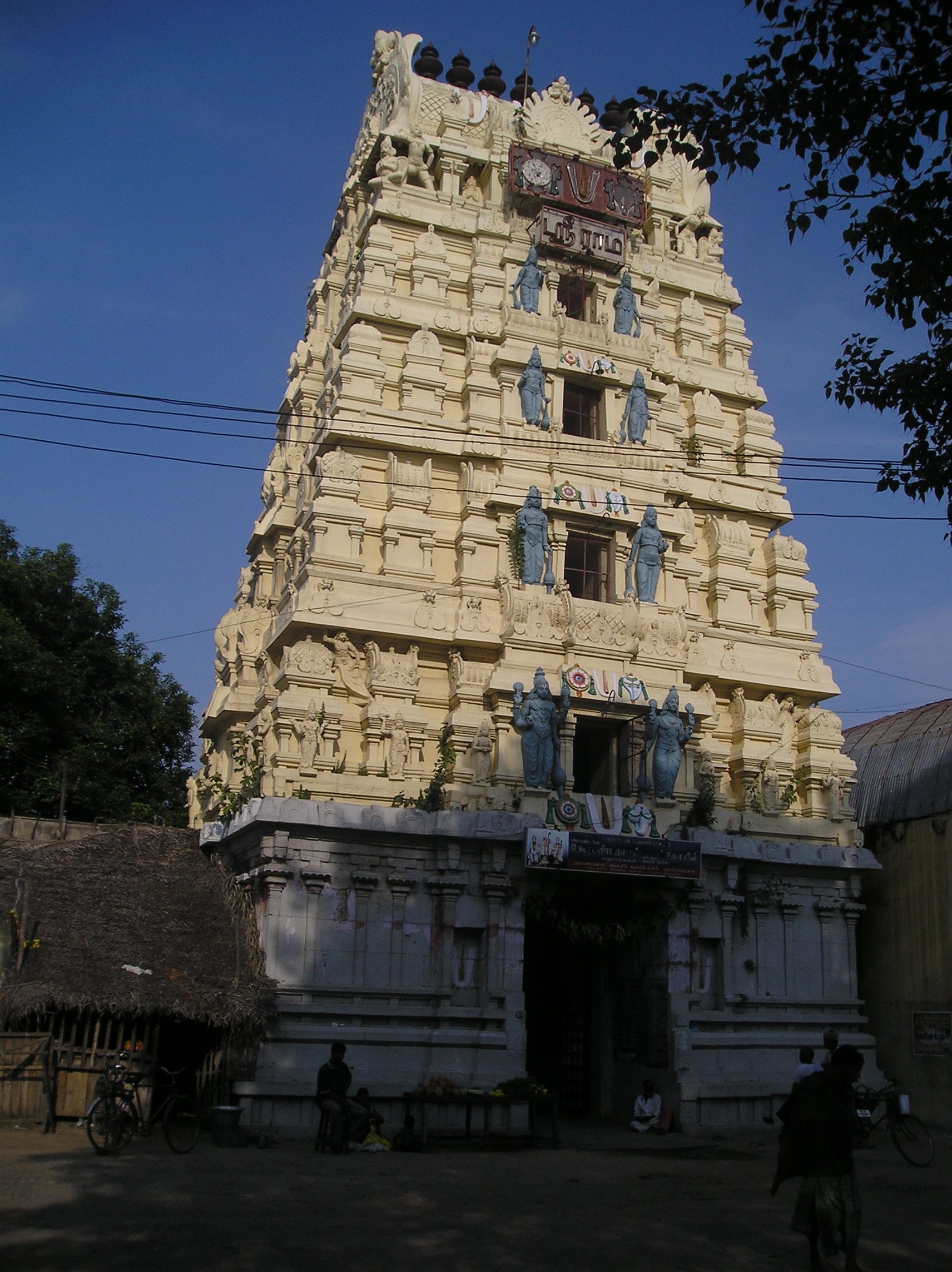

Religion
- Affiliation: Hinduism
- District: Chengalpattu district
- Deity: Rama

Location
- Location: Maduranthakam
- State: Tamil Nadu
- Country: India
- Interactive map of Yeri Katha Ramar Temple
- Coordinates: 12°29′11″N 79°53′28″E

Eri-Katha Raamar Temple is a Hindu temple dedicated to Rama located in the town of Maduranthakam, Tamil Nadu, India. The temple is glorified by Ramanujar, Thirumalisai Alvar and classified as one of the 108 Abhimana Kshethrams of the Vaishnavate tradition. This is the sthalam (place) where Udayavar (the presiding deity) was named Ramanuja. The temple is also known by other names such as - Mathuranthaka Chaturvedi Mangalam, Vaikunda Varthanam, Thirumathurai, Thirumanthira Tirupathi, Karunagara Vilagam. Thirumalisai Alvar attained siddhi (enlightenment) in this sthalam (place). Also, Sri Ramanujar was instructed the Pancha Samskara Mantram at this place.

== History ==
The temple was built during the Pallava era, and is estimated to be 1600 years old. The Moolavar (presiding deity) of the temple is Rama, thus making this one of the oldest temples of Rama in South India. The temple has inscriptions indicating generous gifts from Chola king Parantaka I. The place was once famous during the rule of Cholas who ruled this place as Maduranthaga Chaturvedi Mangalam after the Chola ruler Madurantaga Uttama Chola (973–985 CE). It is believed that Gandaraditya donated the village to the Vedics (Chaturvedi - one who knows all four vedas) of the place and hence it came to be known as Chaturvedi Mangalam.

== The Temple ==
The presiding deity of the temple is Rama with his consort Sita and his brother Lakshmana. The images are made of stucco as is the case in some of the temples like Ulagalantha Perumal Temple, Kanchipuram. The Moolavar is in a standing position facing east and is around 8 feet (2 m) tall.

There are different shrines around the sanctum and one of them is that of Sita who is worshipped as Janakavalli.

== The Legend of Erikatha Ramar and Janakavalli Thayar of the temple ==
This temple is situated near the Madhuranthakam lake shore. The temple also houses an image of Karunakaramurthi.

During the period between 1795 and 1799 the Collector of Chingleput District was a British officer called Colonel Lionel Blaze. During his collectorship, Blaze had witnessed two breaches to the huge tank. The enormity of the problem can be appreciated only when we know of the massive size of the tank. Having an area of 13 square miles (34 km^{2}) and a depth of 21 feet (6 m), the breaching of the tank following torrential downpour was any official's nightmare. Wanting to take preemptive action in the year 1798 the Collector camped in Madurantakam. During his sojourn the Collector was exploring ways and means to undertake urgent repairs of the breaches if and when they happened. During the course of his inspections, he happened to see a large collection of granite and other stones in the precincts of the Rama temple. The Collector mentioned to his subordinates that these could be put to use in restoration of the bunds. Hearing this the temple priests submitted that the stones were meant for constructing a separate shrine for Janakavalli Thayar and since there was paucity of funds the construction could not commence.

Hearing this the Collector is said to have remarked that where was the need for a separate shrine when more urgent work like repairing the bunds was crying for resources. He also asked the priests jestingly as to why the Lord was not able to save the tank each year? The priests replied saying that the Lord was always known to answer a sincere prayer from the heart. The rains came and it poured. Within a few days the tank was full to the brim and a breach seemed imminent. That night a worried Collector camped near the tank hoping against hope that the bunds would hold. As he was inspecting, Colonel Blaze saw a miraculous sight. He saw two warriors bearing bow and quiver guarding the bunds. The British officer went on his knees and prayed, for he knew it was none other than Lord Rama and his divine brother Lakshmana. It was indeed strange that nobody else who was a part of the Collector's retinue saw the Lord. After a while the vision evanesced and the rain stopped. The grateful Collector undertook the building of the shrine for Janakavalli thayar and Lord Rama in the temple came to be known as the Erikatha Ramar (Rama who saved the tank (Eri)). The edict with the Collector's name citing him as a benefactor can be seen even today in the Madurantakam temple.

== Ramanuja ==
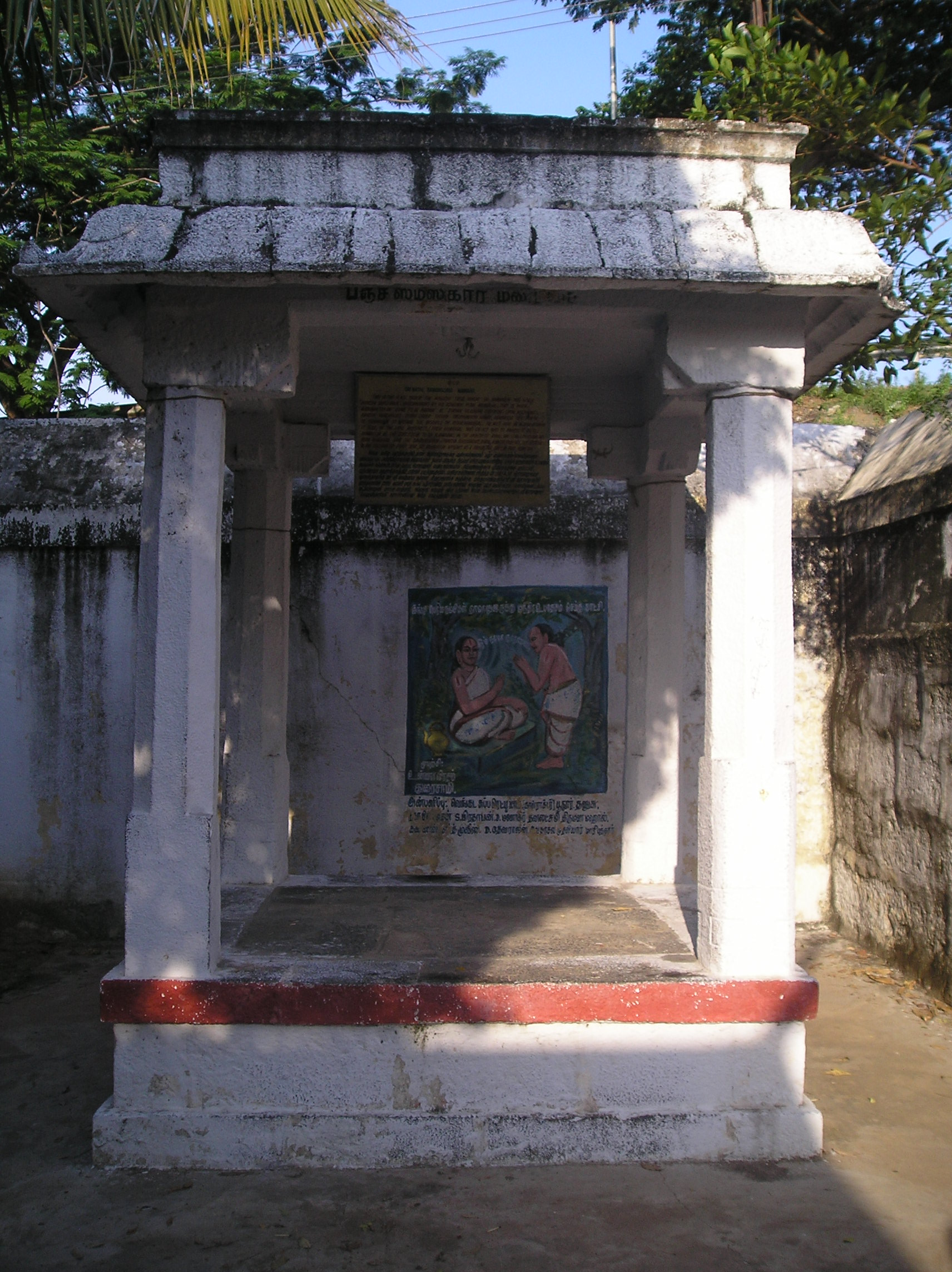
Place where Ramanuja was given the Pancha Samskaram (Divine syllable)

Under the Magizha tree is a shrine where the saint Ramanuja was given "Pancha Samskaram" (initiation) by his teacher Peria Nambigal, following which Maduranthakam was given the name "Dvayam Vilindha Tirupathi". As per the legend, upon receiving Kanchi Varadarajar's divine order through Tirukachi Nambi, the Vaishnava saint Ramanuja set forth for Srirangam to become the disciple of Peria Nambigal. Peria Nambigal was on his way to Kanchipuram to install Ramanuja as the successor of Yamunacharya. Ramanuja wanted to meet Periya Nambi and he started from Kanchipuram, while Periya Nambi started from Srirangam. They are believed to have met in Maduranthakam temple, in the lake precincts. In the month of Avani, on the Sukla Panchami, Peria Nambigal gave the Samasrayanam or Pancha Samskaram called Dvaya Mantropadesam (divine syllable). The festival is celebrated every year. Ramanuja is believed to have obtained Pancha Samskaram from Periya Nambi in the four pillared hall around the sanctum. This is the only place where Ramanuja can be seen as a Grihastha (family man).

The major festival of the temple is the Rama Navami festival, which commemorates the birth of Rama. Ani Brahmostavam celebrated during the Tamil month of Aani (July - August) and Panchasamskaram festival to commemorate the sanctification of Ramanuja are other major festivals celebrated in the temple.
