= Indalur =

- metropolitan area
- Location in Tamil Nadu, India Indalur (India)
- Coordinates: 10°47′5.35″N 79°8′31.3″E
- Country: India
- State: Tamil Nadu
- District: Thanjavur
- Region: Cauvery Delta

Government
  - Type: Panchayat
  - Body: Thanjavur City Municipal Corporation
  - President: Mayil

Area
  - Total: 15 km^{2} (5.8 sq mi)
- Elevation: 88 m (289 ft)

Population (2011)
  - Total: 1,862
  - Density: 120/km^{2} (320/sq mi)

Languages
  - Official: Tamil
- Time zone: UTC+5:30 (IST)
- PIN: 613102
- Telephone code: 04362
- Vehicle registration: TN 49
- Literacy: 75%

Indalur is a village in the Thanjavur taluk of Thanjavur district, Tamil Nadu, India.

== Landmarks ==
Two rivers namely "Kallanai Kaalvaai" and " Vennar" are located in Indalur. There is a very famous Karuppu Swamy Kovil. There are nearly about 10 temples around there.

== Demographics ==
According to the latest 2011 census, Indalur has a population of 1862 divided into 474 families. Male population is 912 and that of female is 950. Indalur has an average literacy rate of 75.59 percent, lower than state average of 80.09 percent, male literacy is 82.20 percent, and female literacy is 69.33 percent. In Indalur, total population of 178 is under 6 years of age. Out of the total population, 935 are engaged in work or business activity. 94.87 percent of the total population describe their work as their main job, 79 as cultivators and 588 agriculture labourers. The village is administrated by a Sarpanch.

Caste composition
Caste	Percent
SC	27.01%
Others†	72.99%
Caste composition † Other Backward Class and Forward caste.

== Transportation ==
The nearest railway station is Solagampatti (SGM). Frequent buses are available to Thanjavur, Thiruchhirappalli, Karur, Pudukkottai, Madurai, Chennai and Cochin.
