= Kottaikkadu =

- village
- Interactive map of Kottaikkadu
- Coordinates: 8°37′38″N 78°0′44″E
- Country: India
- State: Tamil Nadu

Languages
  - Official: Tamil
- Time zone: UTC+5:30 (IST)
- PIN: 628 802

Kottaikkadu is a small village in Tuticorin district (Tamil Nadu), belongs to Srivaikundam Taluk and Siruthonda Nallore panchayat.

== Etymology ==
All four sides of the village are bounded by forest, so the village is named as Kottai Kadu. In Tamil, Kottai means "Fort" and Kadu means "Forest".

- Nearest Town : Eral, Tuticorin
- Nearest Railway Station: Tuticorin / Kurumbur / Tirunelveli / Tiruchendur
- Nearest Airport: Tuticorin / Madurai / Trivandrum
- STD Code: +91-4630

== Village economy ==
Total number of houses are 180 and population is more than 800, with 56% of Male and 44% of female.

== Education ==
All people have completed their primary education. Nowadays, all people have completed their 8th standard. A primary school is there, around 90 students (also from the nearby villages) are learning their primary education at this school. For higher education, they are going to various places like Eral (2 km), Sawyerpuram(6 km), Panikkanadarkudiyiruppu (8 km).

Around 20 persons have completed their graduation in engineering and 5 persons have completed their graduation in medicine. Every year at least 4 students are getting graduation in various disciplines of arts and science. Others went to different countries for their higher studies and job opportunities.
