= Kanthaswamy temple, Cheyyur =

Kanthaswamy Temple
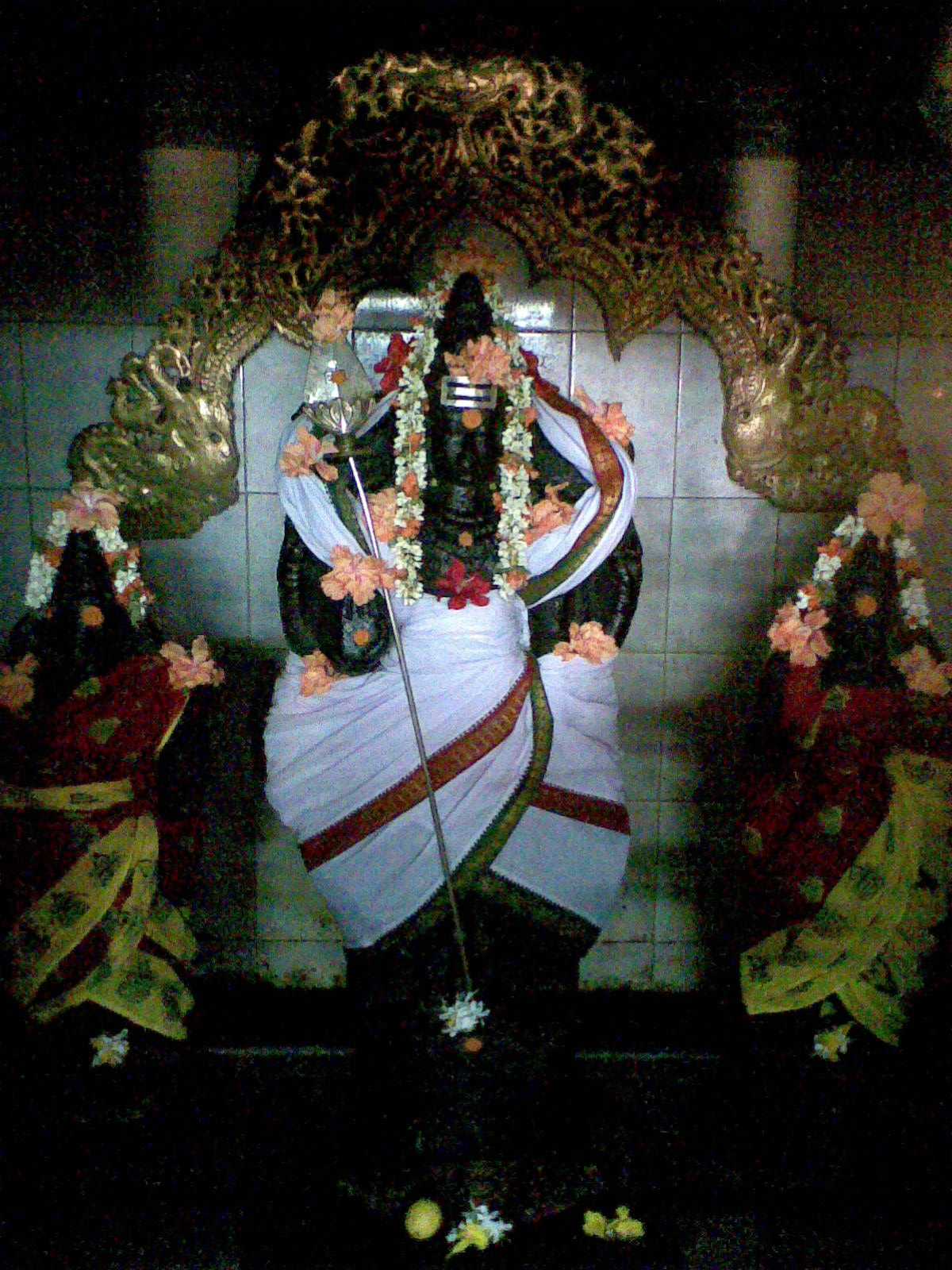

- Location in Tamil Nadu

Religion
- Affiliation: Hinduism
- District: Chengalpattu
- Deity: Kanthaswamy (Murugan) Valli, Deivasena

Location
- Location: Cheyyur
- State: Tamil Nadu
- Country: India
- Interactive map of Kanthaswamy Temple
- Coordinates: 12°21′09″N 80°02′22″E

Architecture
- Type: Dravidian architecture

Kanthaswamy Temple in Cheyyur, in Chengalpattu district in the South Indian state of Tamil Nadu, is dedicated to the Hindu god Murugan. Constructed in the ancient Tamil style of architecture, the temple was constructed during the Cholas during the 10th century. Murugan is worshipped as Kanthaswamy along with his consorts Valli and Deivasena. A granite wall surrounds the temple, enclosing all its shrines.

The temple is open from 6 am - 12:30 pm and 4:30 - 8:00 pm on all days. Four daily rituals and many yearly festivals are held at the temple, of which the Vaikasi Visagam, Kanthasasti festival, Soorasamharam, Thaipoosam festival and Panguni Uthiram festival being the most prominent being the most prominent. The temple is maintained and administered by the Hindu Religious and Endowment Board of the Government of Tamil Nadu.

== Legend ==
As per Hindu legend, Muruga obtained the Vel (spear) from his mother Parvathi from Sikkal Singaravelan Temple. He slayed Sooran, the demon, the event called Soorasamharam at Tiruchendur. During the war, the Bhutaganas, Shiva's army, is also believed to have helped Murugan. Since Murugan killed Sooran and his son Iranyeswaran, he attained Dosha (sin). To propitiate himself from the sin, he is believed to have installed the image of Shiva as Somanatha at this place and worshipped Shiva. Since the son of Shiva (called Sei) worshipped him, the place is called Cheyyur. The 27 Bhutaganas are personified to the 27 stars as per Hindu mythology.

== History ==
The place was believed to be ruled by a Chola emperor named Valanvan and the place came to be known as Valavapuri. From the inscriptions in the temple, it is believed that it was constructed by the Cholas during the 10th century. The inscriptions from the Vijayanagar Empire during the 15th century indicate that Muslims were employed in the office of the kings. They also indicate that lands were endowed to the temple by the Muslims. The shrine of Meenakshi was added by the benevolent contribution by a devotee in 1937. The temple is believed to have been visited by Arunagirinathar, a 15th-century Murugan devotee and composed Thiruppugazh at this place.

== Architecture ==
Kanthaswamy temple has a flat rajagopuram in the North, piercing the rectangular granite walls around the temple. The presiding deity Kanthaswamy, is housed in the East facing sanctum, with Valli and Deivasena on either of his sides. The sanctum is approached from the main entrance through the flag staff hall, Maha mandap and Artha mandap. There is a 5 ft (1.5 m) granite Vel in front of Kanthaswamy. The flag staff is located in the flagstaff hall axial to the sanctum. An image of peacock, the vehicle of Muruga and Surya faces the main shrine in the Maha Mandap. There are shrines of Vinayaga before the Mahamandap and the sanctum is guarded by Brahma and Vishnu, which is an unusual feature in Murugan temples. The shrine of Tiripurasundari is located in the second precinct. There are separate shrines of Valli and Deivasena in South facing shrines diagonally opposite to the sanctum. The image of Somanathar and Meenakshi are in the temple. The images of the 27 Bhutaganas, each 2 ft (0.61 m) tall are sculpted in the niches around the sanctum. The first precinct around the sanctum houses the images of Nrithuya Kanthar, Bala Kanthar, Brahma Sastha, Sivagurunathar, Veduvar and Navagrahas. There are several pillars without roof in the precinct indicating the presence of large halls in the temple earlier. A hall called Vadya Mandapa which was used for recitals of Nadaswaram is not existent anymore.

== Festival ==
The temple follows Saivite tradition. The temple priests perform the pooja (rituals) during festivals and on a daily basis. The temple rituals are performed four times a day: Kalasanthi at 7:00 a.m., Uchikalam at 12:30 p.m., and Sayarakshai at 6:00 p.m.. During the Arthajamam between 8:30 - 9:00 p.m, Kanthaswamy is believed to offer his worship Somanatha along with the 27 Bhoothagans and it is enacted every day. Each ritual has three steps: alangaram (decoration), neivethanam (food offering) and deepa aradanai (waving of lamps) for both Kanthaswamy and Tiripurasundari. There are weekly, monthly and fortnightly rituals performed in the temple. The temple is open from 6 am - 12:30 pm and 4-9:00 pm on all days. The temple has many festivals in its calendar, with the Vaikasi Visagam, Kanthasasti festival, Soorasamharam, Thaipoosam festival and Panguni Uthiram festival being the most prominent. Sarva vadyam is a music instrument used in the temple from historic times during the festive occasions. Chengalvaraya Sastri, a historical musician is believed to have composed songs praising the presiding deity. The practise of singing his songs during the rituals is continued in modern times.
