= Puzhal Kottam =

Puzhal Kōttam was an administrative subdivision (kōttam) of Tondaimandalam which is known from inscriptions particularly from the period when Tondaimandalam, also known as Jayamkondacholamandalam, was a viceroyalty of the Chola Empire.Though the boundaries of Puzhal Kottam varied greatly, the district of Puzhal Kōttam roughly corresponded to North Chennai and suburbs that encompass North Chennai. Each kōttam might have had a fort as its administrative centre and the commander of the fort probably exercised civil as well as military authority over the towns and villages within his assigned territory. The fort (kōttam) that formed the administrative centre of Puzhal Kottam might have been located in Puzhal

== Sub-divisions ==
Just like other kottams of the Chola Empire, Puzhal Kottam was sub-divided into many nadus. K. V. Raman compared kōttams with present-day districts and nadus with talukas.

- Akudi Nadu
- Ambattur Nadu
- Athoor Nadu
- Elumur Nadu (present-day Egmore)
- Nayaru Nadu (present-day Parry's Corner, Sowcarpet, Fort St George, Thiruvottriyur, Kattupalli).
- Puzhal Nadu (present-day Puzhal)
