= Vidal Rock =

Island in the South Shetland Islands

- Location of Greenwich Island in the South Shetland Islands

- Location within Antarctic Peninsula Location within Antarctica

Geography
- Location: Antarctica
- Coordinates: 62°30′S 59°43′W

Administration
- Administered under the Antarctic Treaty System

Demographics
- Population: Uninhabited

Vidal Rock or Vidal Islote, is a rock 1.5 kilometres (0.8 nmi) west of Ferrer Point in southern Discovery Bay, Greenwich Island, South Shetland Islands. It was named by the first Chilean Antarctic Expedition (1947) for mariner Osvaldo Vidal, in charge of echo sounding on the frigate Iquique.
