= Vadal =

Vadal may refer to:

- Vadal, Gujarat, a village and petty former princely state on Saurashtra peninsula in Gujarat, India
- Vadal Alexander (born 1994), American NFL offensive guard
- Vadal Peterson (1892–1976), American basketball coach

== See also ==
- Nedre Vådal, near Røra, Nord-Trøndelag county, Norway
