= Mohamed Bouye Ould Cheikh Mohamed Vadel =

Mauritanian politician (born 1977)

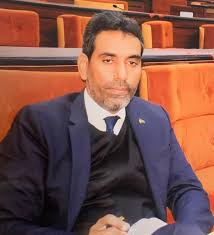
MP Mohamed Bouye Cheikh Mohamed Vadel

Mohamed Bouye Ould Cheikh Mohamed Vadel (born 31 December 1977) is a Mauritanian politician, diplomat, and Member of Parliament. During his career, Vadel criticized government corruption, abuses of power, and systemic inequality. Supporters describe him as a leading voice for social justice and democratic accountability.

In 2023, Vadel gave a parliamentary speech that was deemed insulting to the President of the Republic. In response, the government withdrew Vadel's constitutional parliamentary immunity and arrested him. Opposition parties, civil society groups, human rights organizations, and MPs from both the opposition and the ruling majority denounced these sanctions as unlawful and unprecedented in Mauritania's history. The case triggered a major political crisis, nationwide protests, and sparked international commentary.

== Early life and career ==
Mohammed Vadel was born into a well-known religious and scholarly family with a long tradition of civic leadership. He grew up in an environment of moral discipline and social responsibility. Later he pursued studies in Saudi Arabia before entering public service.

He served in various diplomatic roles, including assignments in Saudi Arabia, and later worked as an advisor within the Mauritanian Ministry of Foreign Affairs. In 2015, he became President of the Mauritanian Diplomatic Federation.

== Parliamentary career ==
Vadel was first elected to the National Assembly in 2018, representing a Nouakchott constituency, and was re-elected in 2023. He became known for sharp interventions, detailed scrutiny of government policy, and a highly direct style of political expression. His efforts to expose systemic corruption, advocate for social justice, and defend the rights of workers, teachers, nurses, and low-income communities contributed significantly to his popularity. Vadel championed anti-corruption initiatives, accountability mechanisms, and the protection of vulnerable groups. He submitted proposals relating to pay increases for public sector workers, improvements in social welfare, and measures aimed at reducing inequality. His supporters describe him as “the voice of the voiceless” for his commitment to marginalized communities and his willingness to challenge entrenched interests.

=== Wild Boar Intervention ===
In July 2019, Vadel held an intervention in the National Assembly, widely known as the “Wild Boar” intervention. During the speech, he used the metaphor of a wild boar to criticize then-President Mohamed Ould Abdel Aziz and what he described as widespread corruption and mismanagement. In response, the president and ruling party condemned Vadel's remarks, and a parliamentary committee was formed to investigate. The national broadcasting authority removed the speech from state television, and the High Authority for Press and Audiovisual prohibited media outlets from publishing or airing the intervention.

The episode ignited widespread public debate and went viral on Mauritanian social media, with commentators noting that it marked a turning point in Vadel's political influence.

=== 2023 Constitutional Crisis ===
In July 2023, Vadel delivered a parliamentary address during a session attended by the Prime Minister. The speech was denounced by members of the ruling party and government officials, who described it as disrespectful to the President of the Republic. The Prime Minister responded at length, and the head of the ruling party declared a political state of emergency. The High Authority for Press subsequently removed the speech from national broadcasts.

==== Suspension and immunity lifting ====
Following the controversy, Vadel was suspended from parliamentary activity. On 29 July 2023, the National Assembly voted to remove his parliamentary immunity. Political parties, civil society organizations, human rights groups, and several MPs from the ruling majority characterized the move as “an unprecedented action in the history of the country”, “a coup against the constitution”, “a death announcement for democracy”, and “an institutional coup against an elected MP”. The episode triggered widespread political backlash, with analysts noting that it represented a major rupture in Mauritania's democratic development.

==== Arrest and detention ====
Vadel was arrested on 31 July 2023. On 7 August, he was remanded to prison, where he remained for nearly three months. His arrest and detention triggered nationwide protests in cities such as Nouakchott, as well as demonstrations among Mauritanian diaspora communities abroad.

Demonstrators were violently dispersed, with numerous reports of arbitrary arrests, beatings, and serious injuries. Some protesters were hospitalized with broken limbs and other trauma, and activists who publicly supported Vadel reported intimidation and threats. Civil society observers criticized the crackdown as excessive and abusive.

During his detention, reports from independent media and civil society groups stated that his health deteriorated significantly. He was transferred to a hospital multiple times. The Hope Alliance (تحالف أمل موريتانيا) publicly held the government responsible for safeguarding his health, while his lawyers warned that he required urgent medical intervention.

The case drew condemnation across the political spectrum. Human rights organizations criticized the lifting of his immunity as non-constitutional, and members of the official opposition described the situation as a coup against parliamentary protections. The majority of MPs refused to participate in the committee that voted to remove his immunity. MP Mohamed Lemine Ould Sidi Maouloud, chair of the Human Rights Committee in the Arab Parliament, stated that the events represented “one of the darkest days in the history of the National Assembly and of Mauritania.”

==== Release and aftermath ====
On 2 November 2023, Vadel was granted provisional release. In remarks after his release, he declared that his arrest had “Nothing to do with the parliamentary speech,” asserting instead that he was targeted because of his five-year campaign against corruption and his role in exposing governmental abuses. Many political parties and civil society organizations echoed this view, describing his case as politically motivated.

== Humanitarian work ==
Beyond politics, Vadel had engaged in a number of humanitarian initiatives. He organizes annual distributions of food baskets to vulnerable families, assisting thousands of households. During the COVID-19 pandemic, he provided free transportation for kidney-failure patients during curfew hours to ensure access to dialysis centers. His charitable work has contributed to his popularity, especially among low-income communities.
