= Cheyyur =

Town in Tamil Nadu, India

Coordinates: 12°21′N 80°00′E

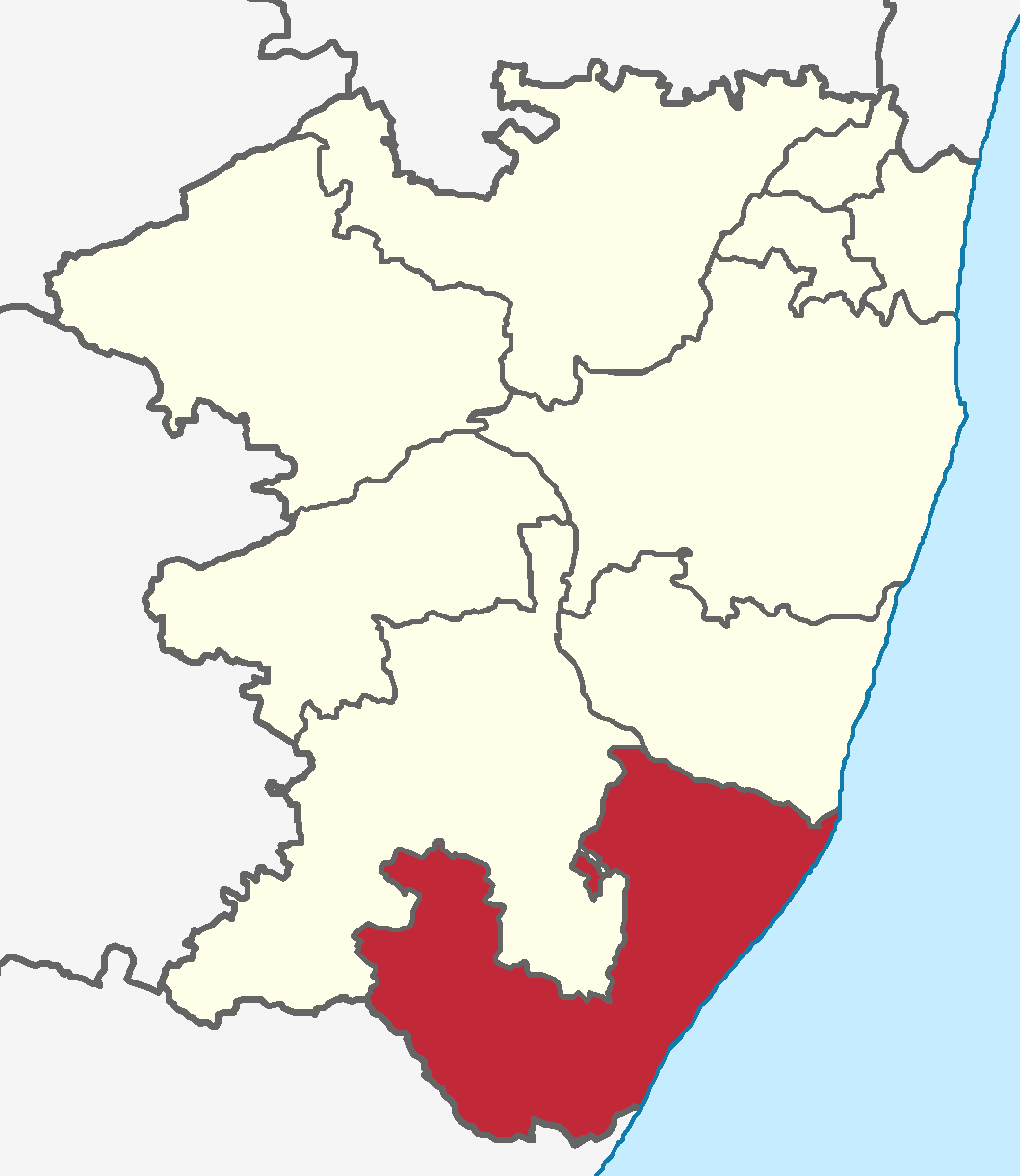
Cheyyur Geographical Representation

Cheyyur (Tamil: [sɛjjuːr]) is a town in Chengalpattu district in the Indian state of Tamil Nadu. Cheyyur is surrounded by four sub-areas: North, East, South and West Cheyyur. The town has a Taluk Office (administrative offices) and a regional treasury centre. It is the administrative capital of the taluka of Cheyyur and it is the seat of the Member of Legislative assembly of Cheyyur Constituency in Tamil Nadu State. Cheyyur also host the District Munsif-cum-Judicial Magistrate Court. Cheyyur also is supported by the Fire and Rescue Station and a Police Station under the Superindent of Police, Chengalpattu. There is a taluka government hospital and a veterinary hospital available in the town.

== Geography ==
Cheyyur is a gate of Chennai in south. It is situated 29 km from Madurantakam, Chengalpattu district. Cheyyur is located on the SH 115 . Cheyyur has Odiyur Lake and its Backwaters to its south east and surrounded by small lakes and water bodies all around.

== History ==
The town has been renamed multiple times in the past. It was previously called Jayamkonda Chola Nallur, Veerarajendra Nallur, Jayamkonda-Cholapuram, Seyyur, Seigaiyampathy, and Valavappuri. The area originally consisted of dense forests used for hunting by the Chola kings.

== Population ==
Census Parameter Census Data Total Population 10664 Total No of Houses 2626 Female Population % 50.5% ( 5390) Total Literacy rate % 74.4% ( 7936) Female Literacy rate 35.1% ( 3746) Scheduled Tribes Population % 1.2% ( 131) Scheduled Caste Population % 48.6% ( 5188) Working Population % 43.2% Child(0 -6) Population by 2011 1024 Girl Child(0 -6) Population % by 2011 47.8% ( 489)

== Transport ==
Cheyyur is accessible by public transport (bus) from Madurantagam, From GST Road through Southupakam (Melmaruvathur) and Chitamur & through East Coast Road Cheyyur junction (Ellai amman temple). The nearest railway station is Melmaruvathur and the nearest airport is Chennai.

== Economy ==
A weekly market called "Sandhai" has been hosted in Cheyyur every Thursday for centuries. With Cheyyur being the major economic hub for the surrounding hamlets, villagers come and used to barter their goods. Fishing and agriculture, Salt Production are the most common activities.

== Temples ==
Sri Kandaswamy Temple before called seiyur murugan temple, also called the Cheyyur Shiva Temple, is an 800-year-old temple. It was built during the reign of the Chola kings. A shrine near the Shiva Temple is dedicated to Lord Muruga. The origin of the town's name is connected to this shrine. Previously, the town's name was pronounced as "Seyyur", from the word "Sei", meaning "infant".

== Churches ==
The Our Lady of Good Voyage Church was established in 1716 and is one of the standing relics of the missionary services. Local missionaries contributed to economic and academic development by starting or supporting schools and skill development centers as well as providing medical services. The Church of South India in Asia and a Pentecostal church represented by Assemblies of God. The biggest denomination of ECI built a church at Pakkur Manalmeadu.

=== Sisters of Cluny ===
The Foundation at Cheyyur is the 16th House of Cluny in India. It was the first missionary post for French Sisters in rural India. At the request of Reverend Fr. Grandjanny, MEP, the Parish Priest of Cheyyur, four Sisters of St. Joseph of Cluny arrived in Cheyyur from Tindivanam on 24 March 1904. A house and dispensary for the Sisters was built and furnished by Fr. Grandjanny. A Grotto was constructed near the Dispensary and was blessed on 8 September 1912. A bell was sent from France by the Mother General to facilitate common life in the convent. On 22 November 1916 and 28 May 1917, cyclones hit and robbers broke into the house. On 13 December 1999, 6 Sisters were killed when the roof collapsed around 1:30 a.m. Only one nun escaped.

== Industries ==
- Marg Swarnaboomi (New Chennai township) Project.
- Zwelling India private Ltd.
- Altek Beissel Needles Ltd.
- The Government of India has proposed to develop a 4000 MW Ultra Mega Power Plant (UMPP) at Cheyyur.

== Education ==
Below are a few local educational institutes.

- Govt Boys Higher Secondary School
- Govt Girls Higher Secondary School
- Little Flower Girls Higher Secondary School
- St. Mary's Boys Higher Secondary School
- Marg Institute of Design & Architecture Swarnabhoomi, Cheyyur
- Adhiparasakthi Polytechnic College
- Adhiparasakhthi College of Pharmacy
- MARG Navajyothi Vidyalaya - CBSE School
- Crescent Matriculation Higher Secondary School
- Panchayat Union Primary Schools
- Sri Ramakrishna Vidyalaya Metric Higher Secondary School
- Saint Exupery metric Higher Secondary School
- Layola Metric Higher Secondary School
- Thondamanallur Panchayat Middle School

== Tourist Place ==
- Othiyur Lake
- Muthaliyar kuppam Boat house
- Alamparai Fort Kadappakam
- Lake view Road
- Kandhaswamy Temple
- Kurumbarai
