= Gajabrishta =

Gaja in Sanskrit means elephant. 'Brishta' is the back or hip portion of a sitting elephant. The later Cholas of the Chola Empire in the Indian subcontinent, especially the ones in Thondai Mandalam around the North Tamil Nadu area constructed temples which had vimanas in this style.

The sanctum sanctorum of these temples, especially Shiva temples, had this style of vimana.

== See also ==
- Shiva Temples of Tamil Nadu
