= Melmaruvathur =

Neighbourhood in Chengalpattu district, Tamil Nadu in India

- town
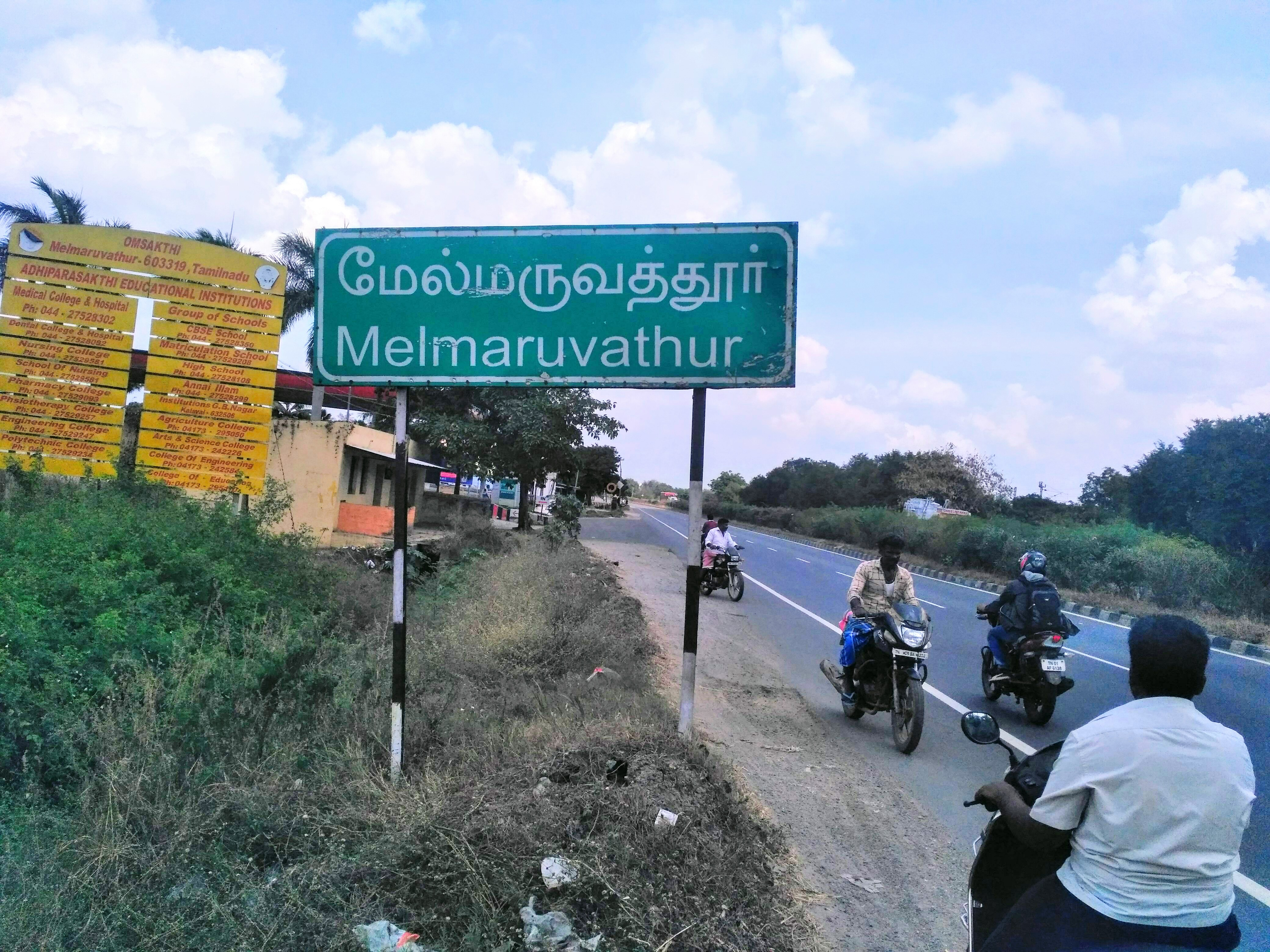

- Melmaruvathur, Chengalpattu, Tamil Nadu
- Coordinates: 12.4268°N 79.8300°E
- Country: India
- State: Tamil Nadu
- District: Chengalpattu
- Elevation: 83 m (272 ft)

Population (2011)
  - Total: 3,367

Languages
  - Official: Tamil, English
- Time zone: UTC+5:30 (IST)
- PIN: 603319
- Telephone Code: +9144xxxxxxxx
- Other neighborhoods: Chengalpattu, Maduranthakam, Acharapakkam
- District Collector: A. R. Rahul Nadh, I. A. S.
- Website: https://chengalpattu.nic.in

Melmaruvathur is a town in the Cheyyur Taluk of Chengalpattu district, Tamil Nadu, India. It is the site of the shrine of the Hindu goddess Adhi Parashakthi, the Om Shakti Temple.
