= Maduranthakam =

Madurantakam
- Town
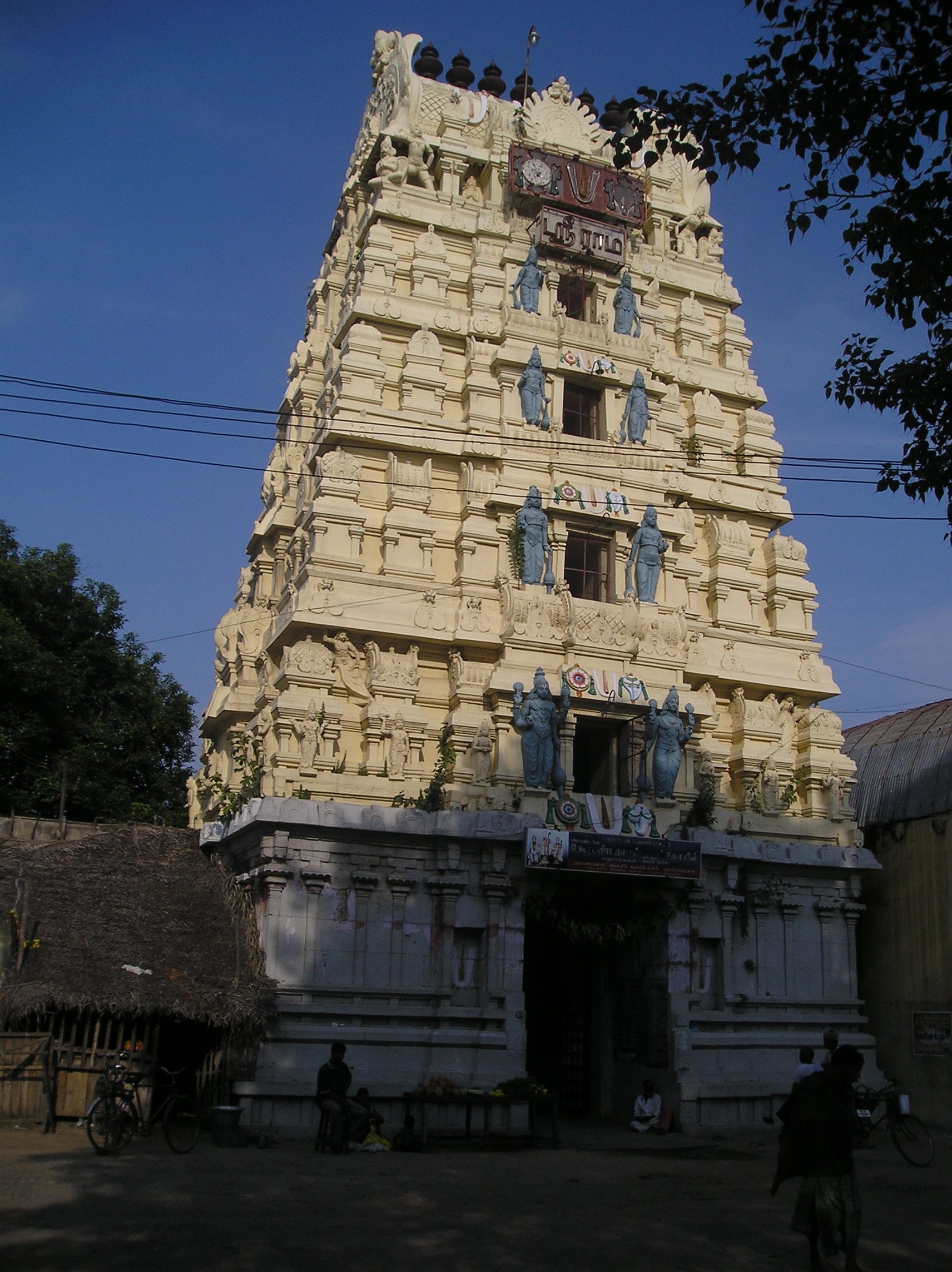
- Temple tower of Eri Katha Ramar temple

- Location in Tamil Nadu, India
- Coordinates: 12°30′36″N 79°53′16″E
- Country: India
- State: Tamil Nadu
- District: Chengalpattu

Government
  - Type: Second Grade Municipality
  - Body: Madurantakam Municipality

Population (2011)
  - Total: 30,796

Languages
  - Official: Tamil
- Time zone: UTC+5:30 (IST)
- PIN: 603306
- Telephone code: +91-44
- Vehicle registration: TN-19-BZ
- Nearest city: Chennai

Madurantakam ([madɯɾaːn̪daɡam]) is the southernmost suburb of Chennai city and a municipality in Chengalpattu district in the Indian state of Tamil Nadu. The town is known for the artificial and second largest lake in Tamil Nadu, the Madurantakam lake. It is said to have been built by the Chola King Uttama Chola, also called as Maduranthaka, during his reign. It is also home to the Eri-Katha Ramar Temple. As of 2011, the town had a population of 30,796.

== History ==
Madurantakam was ruled by Uttama chola Madurantaka (Chola King) 971–985 CE so, it is named as Madurantakam by the memory of the king .202.21.43.112 (talk) 17:27, 24 September 2022 (UTC) Madurantakam is one of the holy places visited by Ramanuja though it has not been sung by the Alvars. The place is also unique in that Ramanuja's statue is found dressed in white on all days while in almost all temples the saint is dressed in ochre. Ramanuja’s life’s biggest incident took place here much before he became a saint. It is here Ramanuja and Periyanambi met each other while Periyanambi was on the way to Kanchi to take Ramanuja home to Srirangam with him to start him teaching.(Ramanuja was on his way to Srirangam too, but both of them happened to take a break at the same EriKaatha Raamar Temple ) Ramanuja and Periyanambi did not want to waste a single minute thereafter and so Periyanambi performed panchasamaskara for Ramanuja here in the temple and thus Ramanuja became his disciple.

In two of his poems, Manavala Mamunigal asks everyone who wants to cast away his past sins to worship the Lord at this place. There are separate shrines for Lakshmi Narasimhar, Periya Nambi and Ramanuja, Andal, Sudarsana and Vedanta Desika. The holy tank is opposite the temple with a separate shrine for Anjaneya on its banks.

== Geography ==
The main town of Madurantakam is situated from its district headquarters Chengalpattu about 25 kilometres and state capital Chennai about 82 kilometres. It serves as the headquarters for Madurantakam taluk. It is just 40 minutes travel to Singaperumal Koil which is nearby Mahindra WorldCity.

The reservoir near Madurantakam irrigates more than 1000 small villages in and around the town. Kiliyar is a small river that originates from the Madurantakam reservoir which will be flooded when the reservoir is full. The Kiliyar river joins Palar before entering the Bay of Bengal.

Madurantakam almost lies in Coromandel coast and gets rains in north-east monsoon season. In the south-west monsoon season, little showers may occur during evenings.

Small hills found in Madurantakam taluk such as Vaiyavoor hill, Malaipalayam hill, Chitravadi hill, Perumberkandigai hill etc.

The soil is black in nature. Also, red soil is found near coastal areas.

== Transportation ==
Madurantakam is serviced by a local bus network that facilitates connectivity within the town and neighboring villages. All buses operate from the centrally located Bus stand in the town center. Additionally, the State Express Transport Corporation runs buses linking Madurantakam to various destinations such as Chennai, Chengalpattu, Kanchipuram, Uthiramerur, Thirukazhukundram, as well as locations along the ECR routes like Cuddalore, Cheyyur, Chithamur, and Chunampet.

Madurantakam railway station belongs to the Chennai railway division and is officially coded as MMK. All passenger and local trains in Chennai–Villupuram route have a halt here and only a few express trains halt.

MEMU services proceed in the southern direction from Chengalpet on the line towards Villupuram. The Chennai Beach to Melmaruvahtur MEMU halts at Maduranthakam.

The Comprehensive Transportation Study proposed to extend some Chengalpattu bound EMUs to Maduranthakam.

== Economy ==
The major occupation of the inhabitants of the town and surrounding regions is agriculture. There are number of Rice mills available.

== Chennai's Global City ==
Tamil Nadu Industrial Development Corporation (TIDCO) has floated a tender to select a consultant for preparing a master plan for the development of a ‘Global City’ at Madurantakam Taluk.

The proposed Global City will feature a planned mix of commercial, residential, institutional, recreational, and cultural zones, supported by next-gen.

== Education ==
A number of educational institutions are available inside the town and surrounding.

=== Arts and science ===
- Sri Malolan College of Arts and Science
- Aksheyaa College of Arts And Science

=== Dental ===
- Karpaga Vinayaga Institute of Dental Science

=== Nursing ===
- Karpaga Vinayaga Institute of Nursing
- Om Sakthi Paramedical & Nursing College

=== Engineering ===
- Shri Andal Alagar College of Engineering
- Karpaga Vinayaga College of Engineering and Technology
- A.C.T. College of Engineering and Technology

=== Teacher training college ===
- Subham College of Education

=== Schools ===
- Vetri Vidyalaya Nursery Primary School
- Hindu Higher Secondary School
- St Joseph's Matric Hr Sec School
- Vivekananda Vidyalaya Matriculation Higher Secondary School
- Vivekananda Vidyalaya CBSE School
- DR. V. Genguswamy Naidu Matric School
- Vm Vidya Kendra Matriculation School
- Janakavalli International Montessori school
- CSI High School
- R.C Primary School
- Subham Vidhyalayaa CBSE School

== Religious sites ==
=== Temples ===
- Sri Kodanda Rama, also known in this region as Eri Katha Rama (the one who saved the village from flooding from Madurantakam lake), is enshrined in the Eri-Katha Ramar Temple. The temple is about 1300 years old. Sita resides in the temple as Sri Janaki Valli. The other deities enshrined are Sri Chakrathalwar, Sri Ramanuja, Sri Lakshmi Narasimha and Sri Hanuman.

The Kodandaramaswamy temple has two sets of utsavar idols of the presiding deity and His consort, and Lakshmana. While one deity is named Rama, the other is known as Karunakaran.

There is also a separate shrine for Goddess Sita, known as Janakavalli Thayar, which is claimed to be very rare. This shrine was built by an English Collector, Colonel Lionel Blaze who assured the people that he would build a shrine for Devi if the newly built surplus water weirs withstood the fury of monsoon rains. The huge tank with immense storage capacity would breach every year after the monsoon rains and wash away the rough stone-built outlet of the tank. While camping at Madurantakam during a monsoon night, the tank was full and almost overflowing. The Collector visited the tank bund and is said to have seen Rama and Lakshmana keeping guard at the tank. The construction of the shrine for the Goddess began the very next morning and the Lord is known as Eri Katha Ramar as he saved the tank bund from collapsing.

- Thiru-Venkateswarar Temple near Madurantakam railway station, too a renowned temples in the town. It was built by a king whose skin disease was relieved when he bathed in the tank; then he realized his wonder and built this temple during British Raj;
- Pidari Sri Setrukal Chelliamman Temple near the bye-pass entrance (from Chennai) is an old temple that has been renovated.
- Aruaaleeswarar Temple, AE Koil street
- Murugar Temple, Murugar Koil street
- Sri Purani Pushkala Iyyanarappan Temple, GST Road
- Narasimha Perumal Temple, near Power station Road
- Renukapara-meswari Temple, Chunampet Road
- Northern-thiru-nallar and Sri Ragavendrar temple and a Vishnu cum Anjaneya temple on the Karunguzhi mountain; then Prasana Venkateswarar temple in Malai Vaiyavoor near Padalam were in the perimeter of Madurantakam.

=== Churches ===
- Global Blessing Centre, GST Road, next to the bank
- St. Antony's Church, Mandabam Street
- CSI Simpson Memorial Church, GST Road
- The Pentecostal Mission, AE Koil Street
- Our Lady of Lourdes Gandhi Nagar

=== Mosques ===
- Masjid-E-Walajah Railway station Road
- Masjid E Darus Salam, GST Road
- Town Jamiya Masjid, GST Road
- Masjide Noorul Uloom, Rajagopal Street

== Theatres ==
- Alankar
- RK - V Creations
- Anand
- Gayathri (GK Cinemas)

== Places of interest ==
=== Bird sanctuary ===
About 12 kilometres (7.5 mi) north-west of Madurantakam lies the Vedanthangal Bird Sanctuary and Karikili Bird Sanctuary, home to many rare and endangered species of migratory birds.

== Demographics ==
Religious census
Religion	Percent(%)
Hindu	89.2%
Muslim	6.69%
Christian	2.87%
Jain	0.79%
Buddhist	0.07%
Sikh	0.02%
Other	0.36%
No religion	0.0%

According to 2011 census, Madurantakam had a population of 30,796 with a sex-ratio of 1,019 females for every 1,000 males, much above the national average of 929. A total of 3,184 were under the age of six, constituting 1,615 males and 1,569 females. The average literacy of the town was 75.4%, compared to the national average of 72.99%. The town had a total of 7,699 households. There were a total of 12,135 workers, comprising 158 cultivators, 1,040 main agricultural labourers, 283 in house hold industries, 8,066 other workers, 2,588 marginal workers, 21 marginal cultivators, 1,031 marginal agricultural labourers, 106 marginal workers in household industries and 1,430 other marginal workers. As per the religious census of 2011, Madurantakam had 89.2% Hindus, 6.69% Muslims, 2.87% Christians, 0.02% Sikhs, 0.07% Buddhists, 0.79% Jains, 0.36% following other religions and 0.0% following no religion or did not indicate any religious preference.

== Politics ==
Madurantakam (SC) is a state assembly constituency in Tamil Nadu, India newly formed after constituency delimitation. It is included in the Kancheepuram parliamentary constituency. K. Maragatham from Tamilaga Vetri kalagam is the current MLA.

== Other attractions ==
Weekly Market (வாராந்திர சந்தை) - There is a weekly market every Monday near Govt Hospital and which sells all things like vegetables, groceries, fruits, fish, etc.
