= List of tech parks in Chennai =

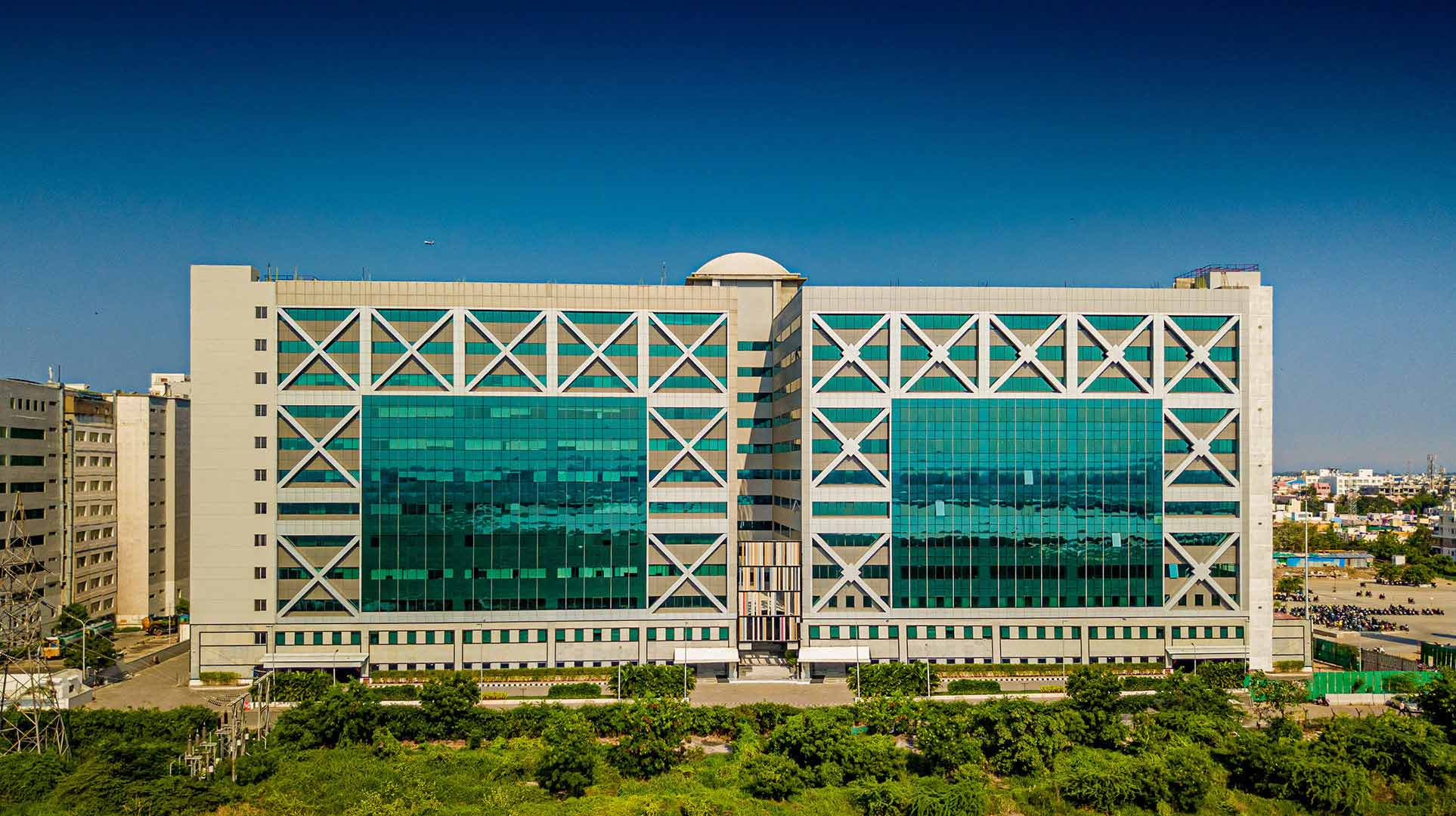
Chennai One IT SEZ

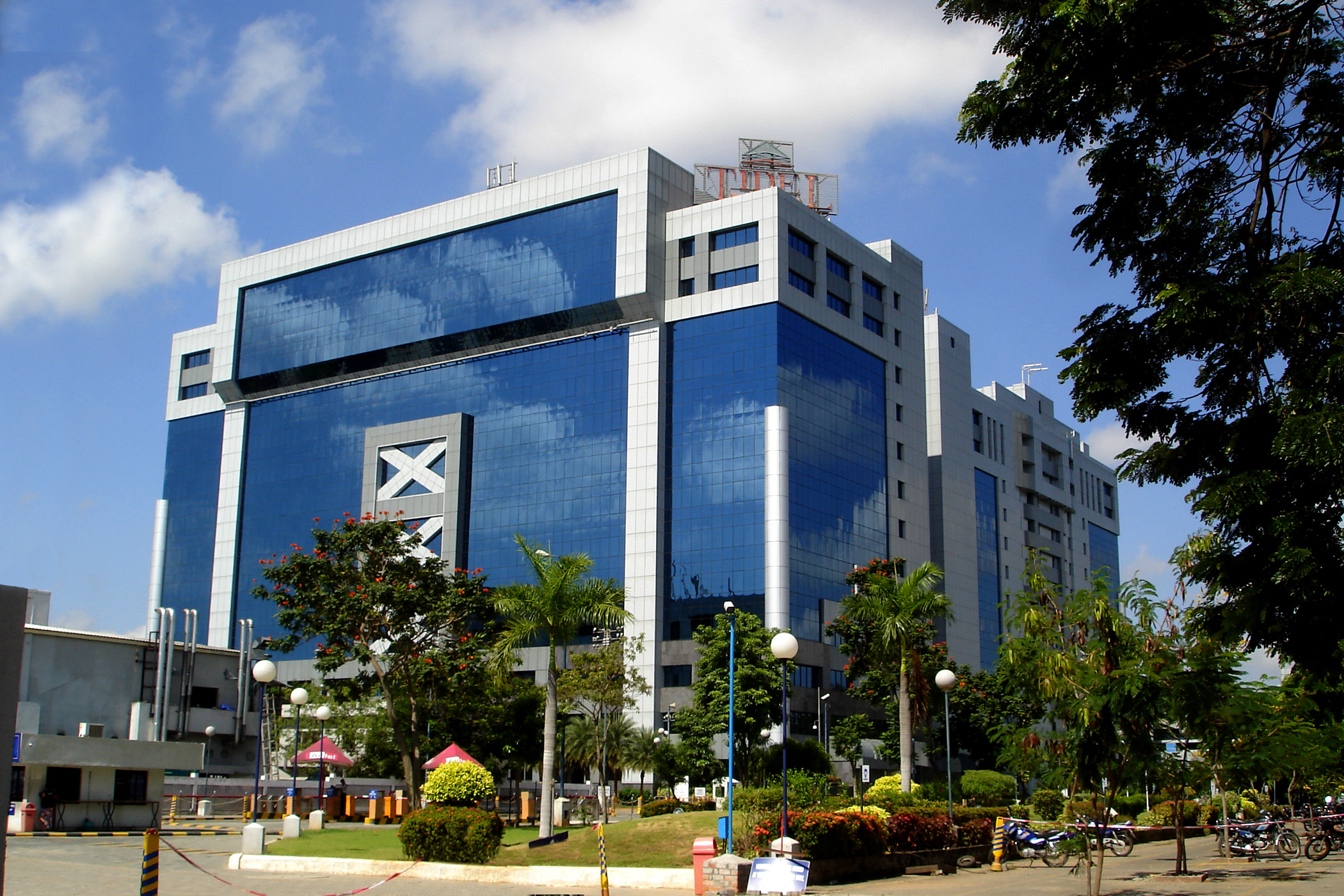
TIDEL Park

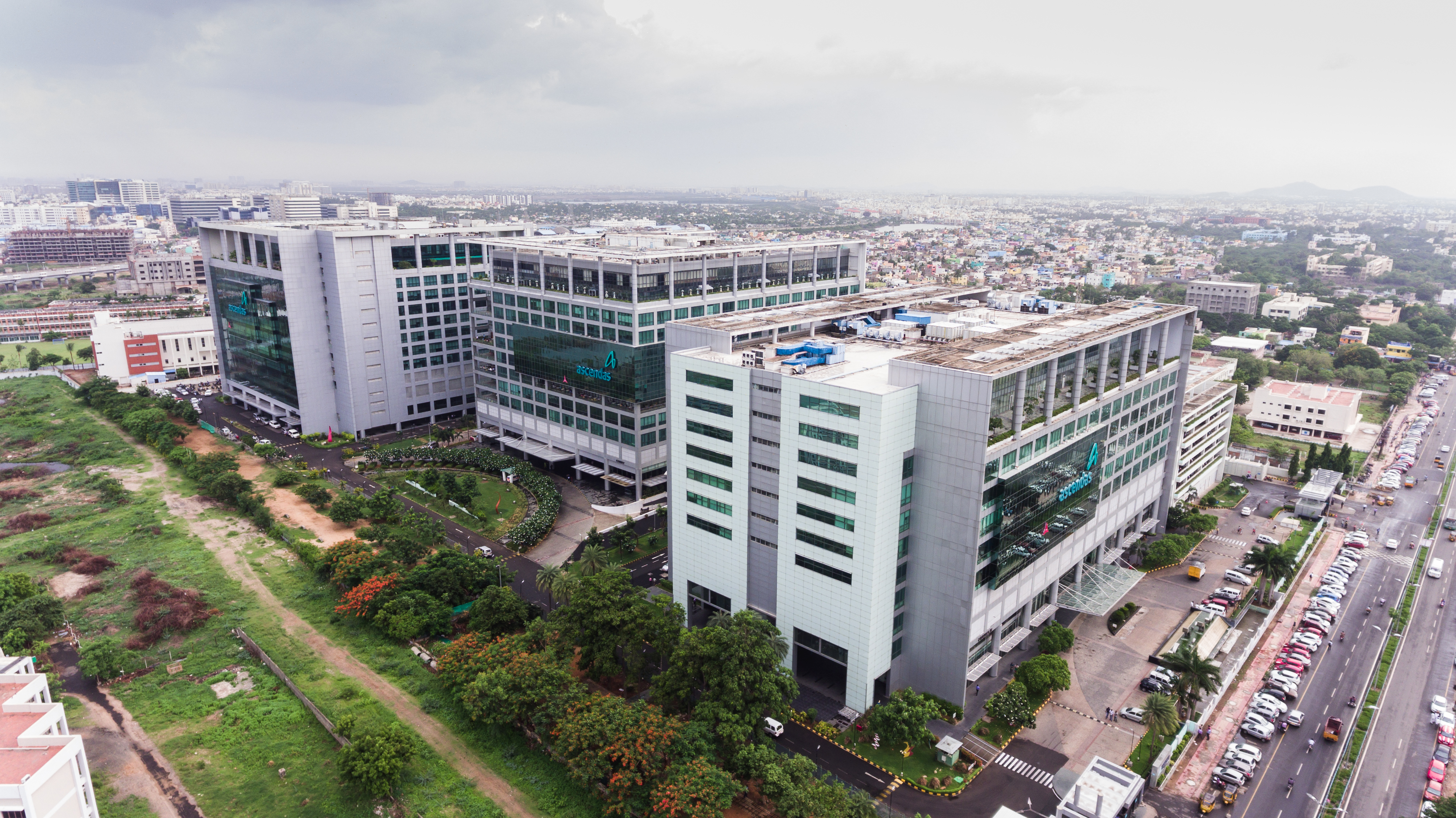
International Tech Park, Chennai

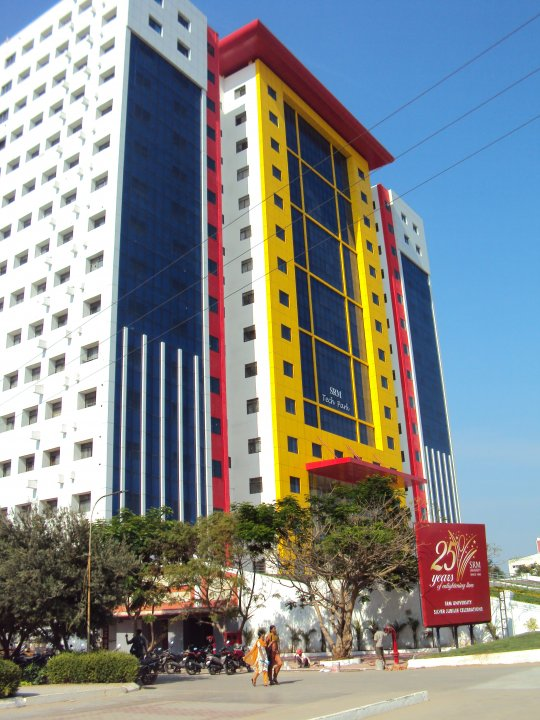
SRM Tech Park

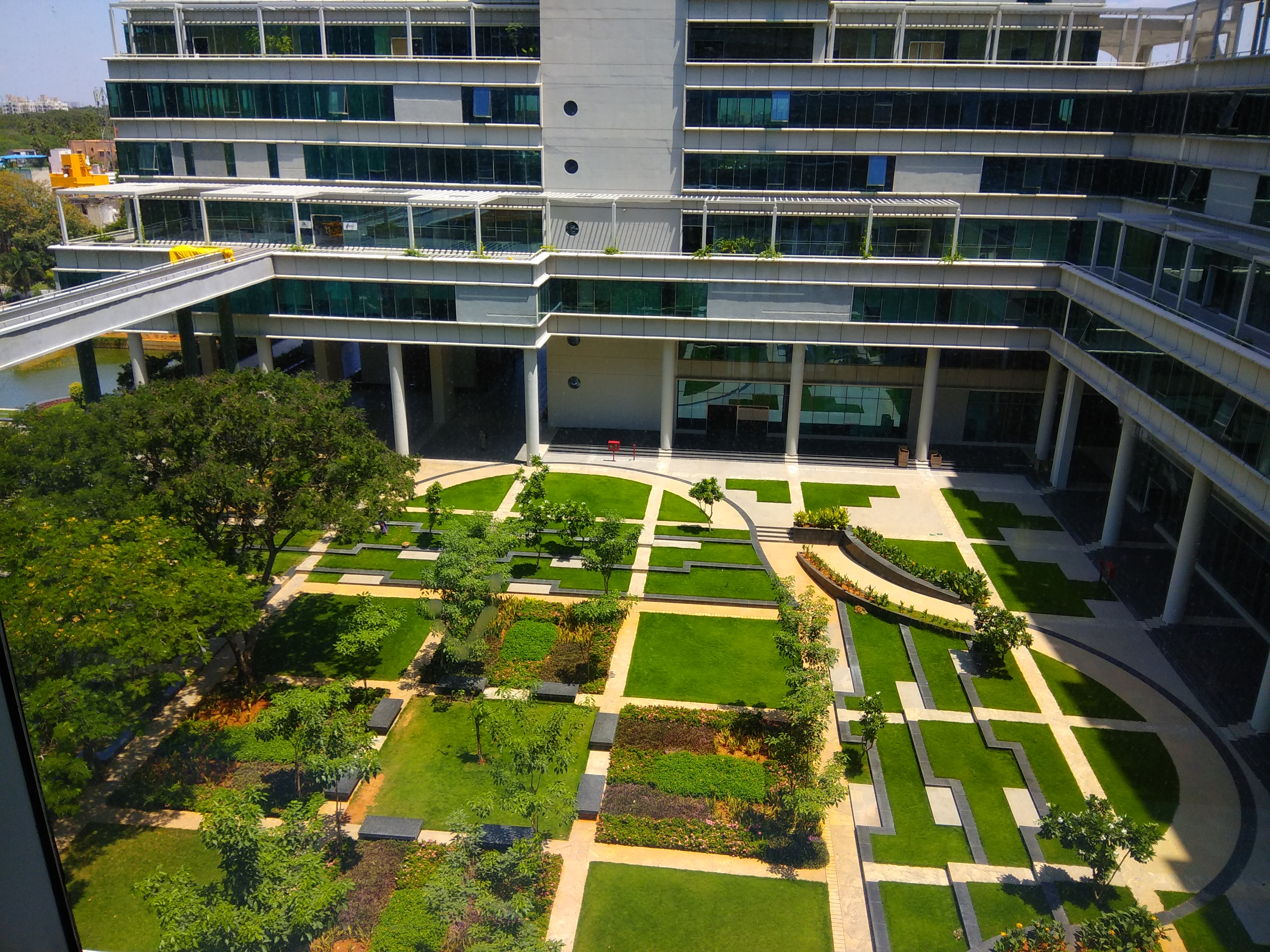
IIT Madras Research Park

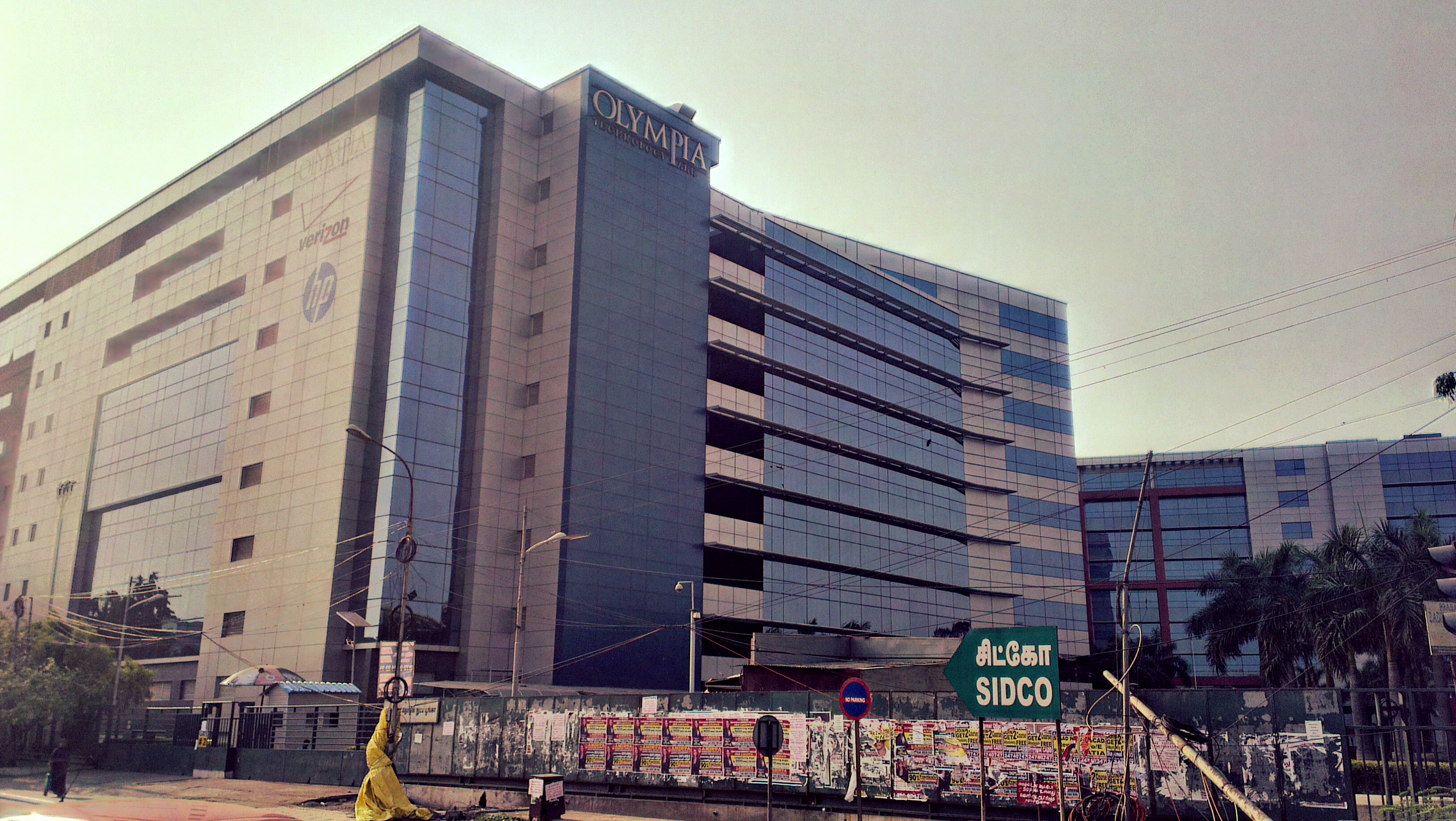
Olympia Tech Park

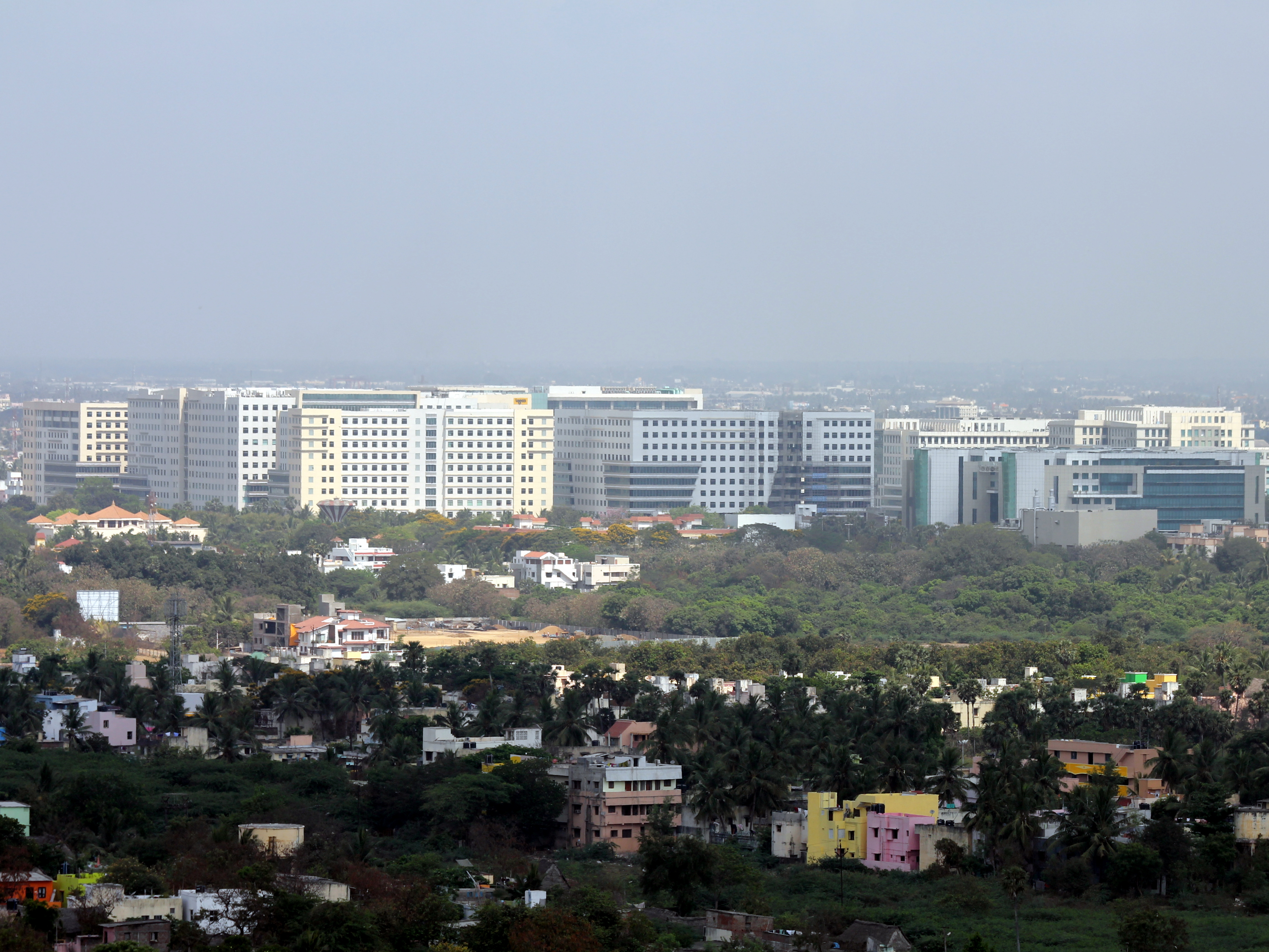
DLF Cybercity Chennai

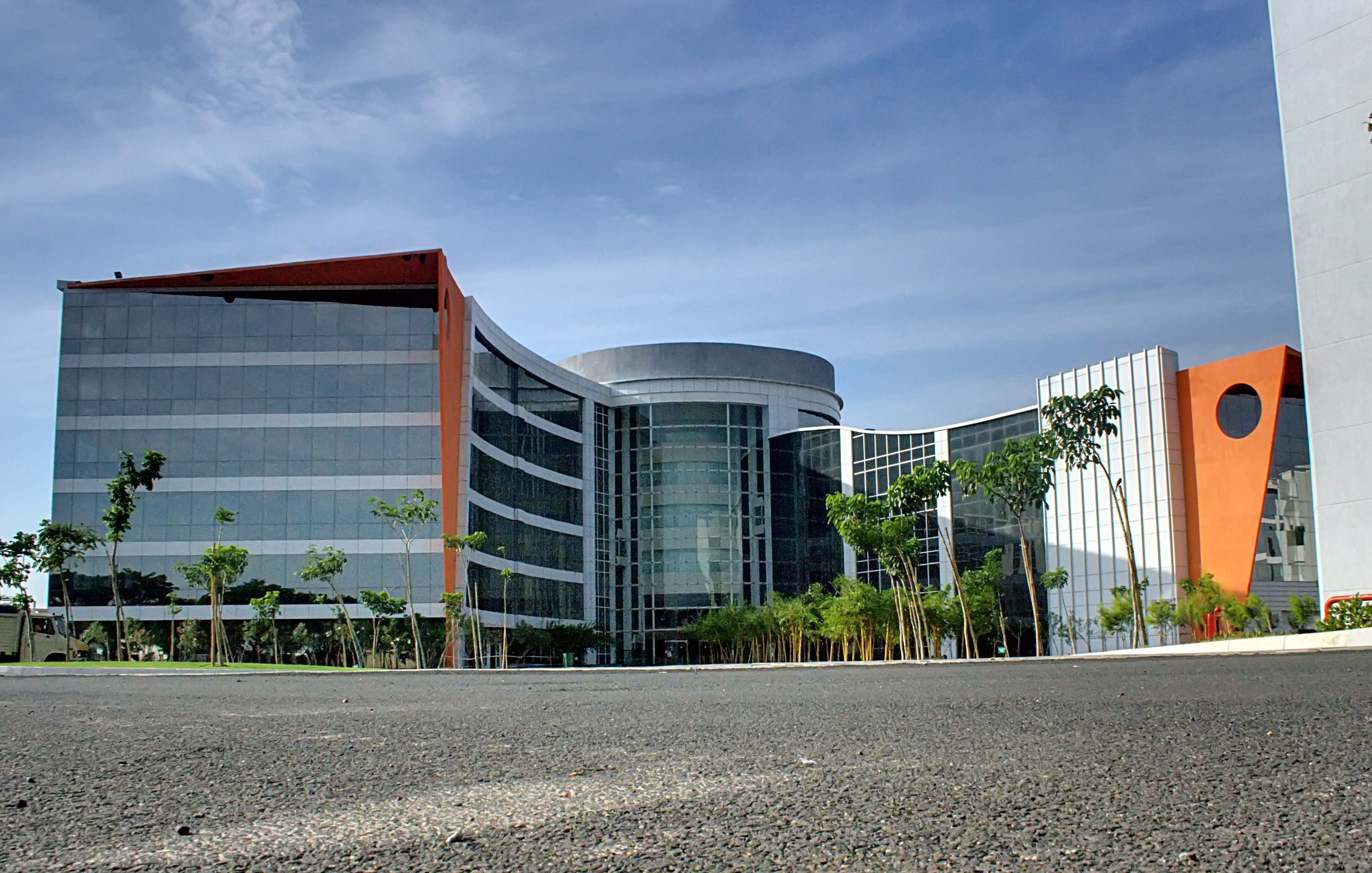
Infosys

Ramco Systems Corporate Office, Chennai

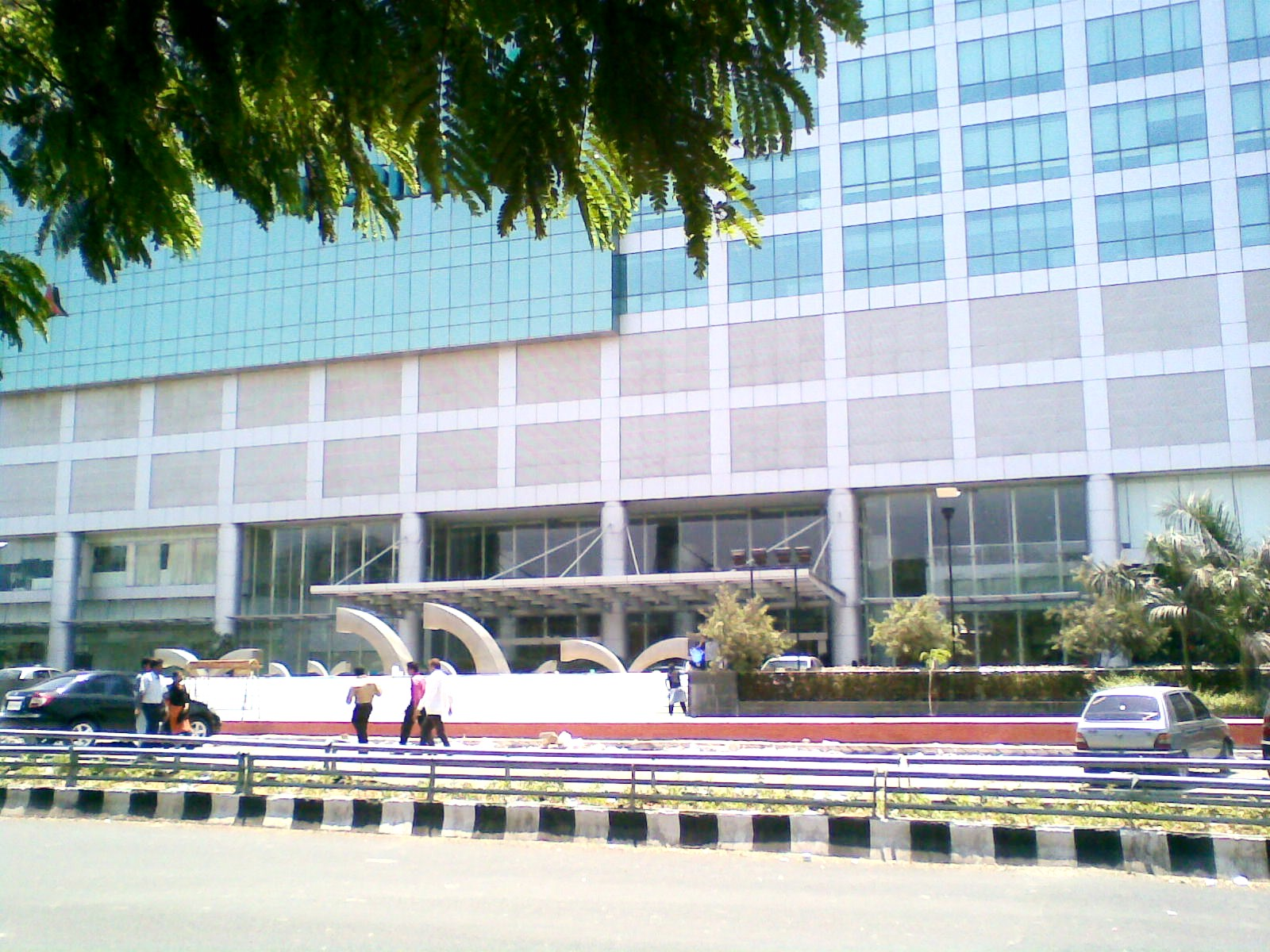
Ascendas IT Park Taramani

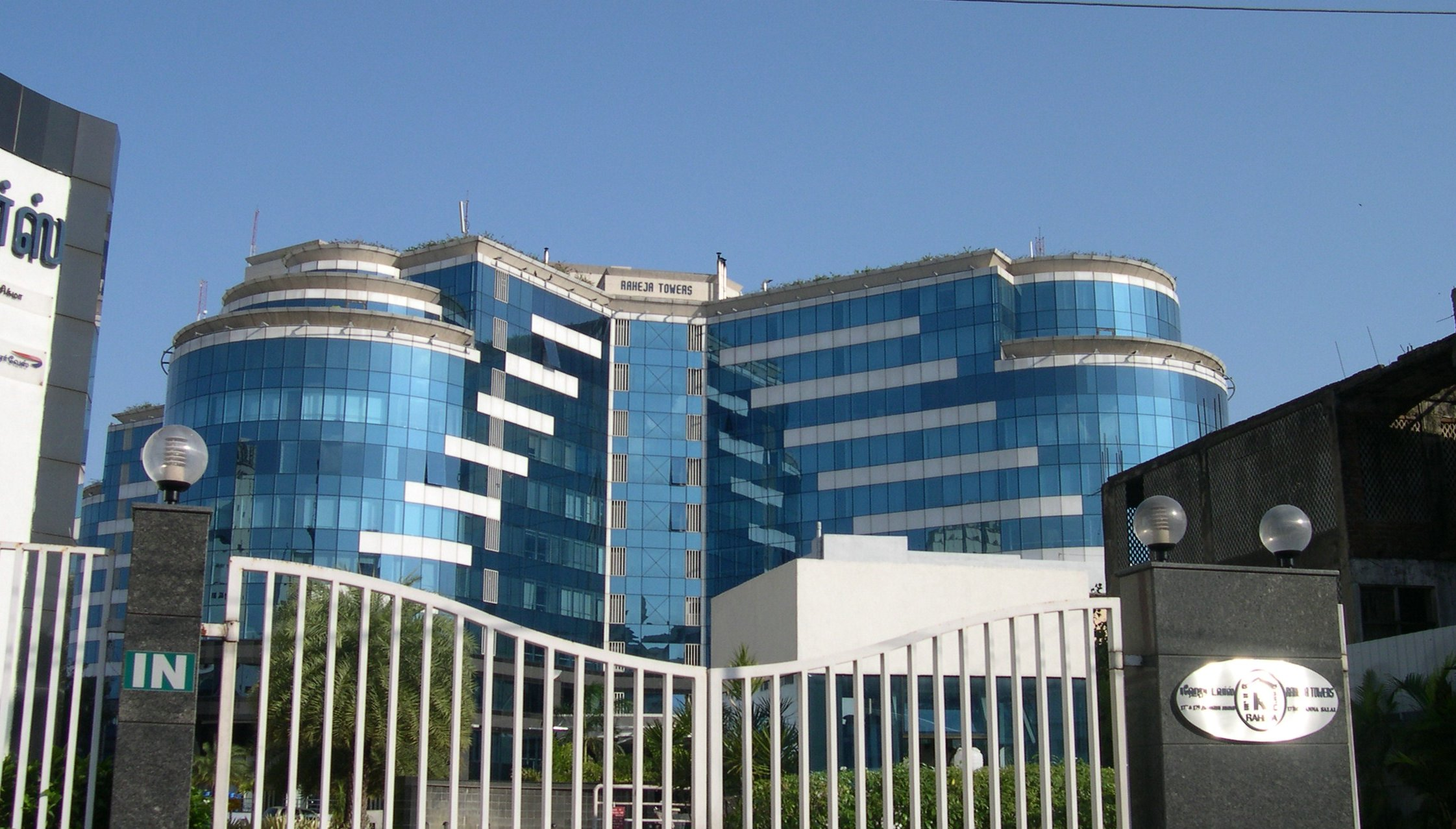
Raheja Towers, Chennai

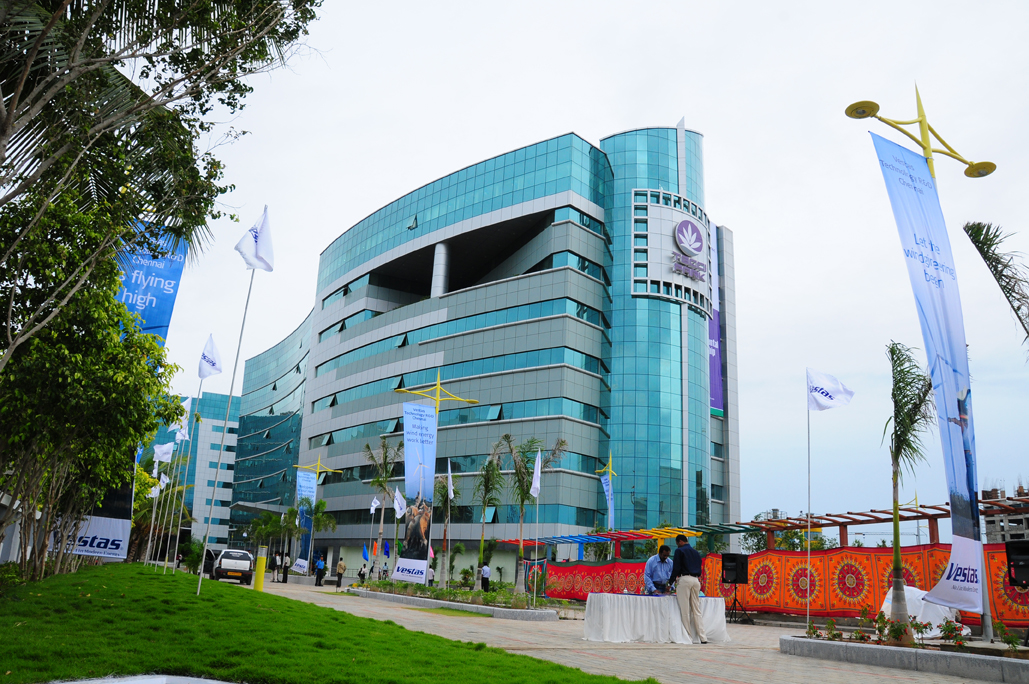
TECCI Park

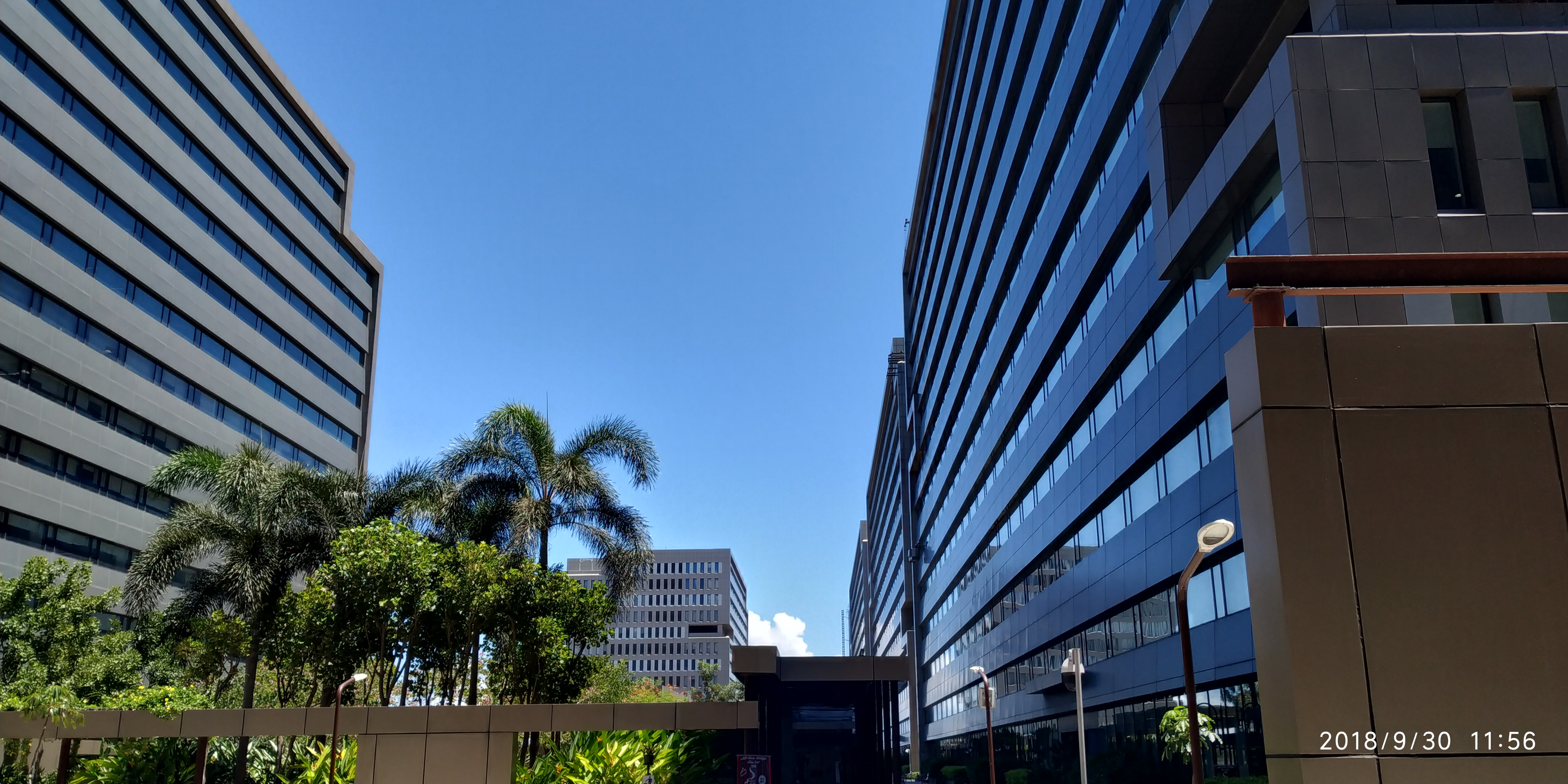
Ramanujan IT City, Tharamani

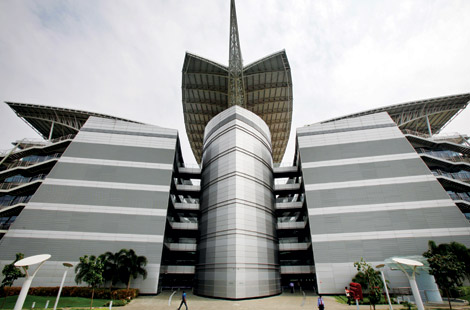
Tata Consultancy Services

The south Indian city of Chennai is fast emerging as a destination for information technology outsourcing and has seen a growing number of IT parks being built here. Most of the upcoming complexes are being built along the IT Corridor and the southern suburb.

== List ==
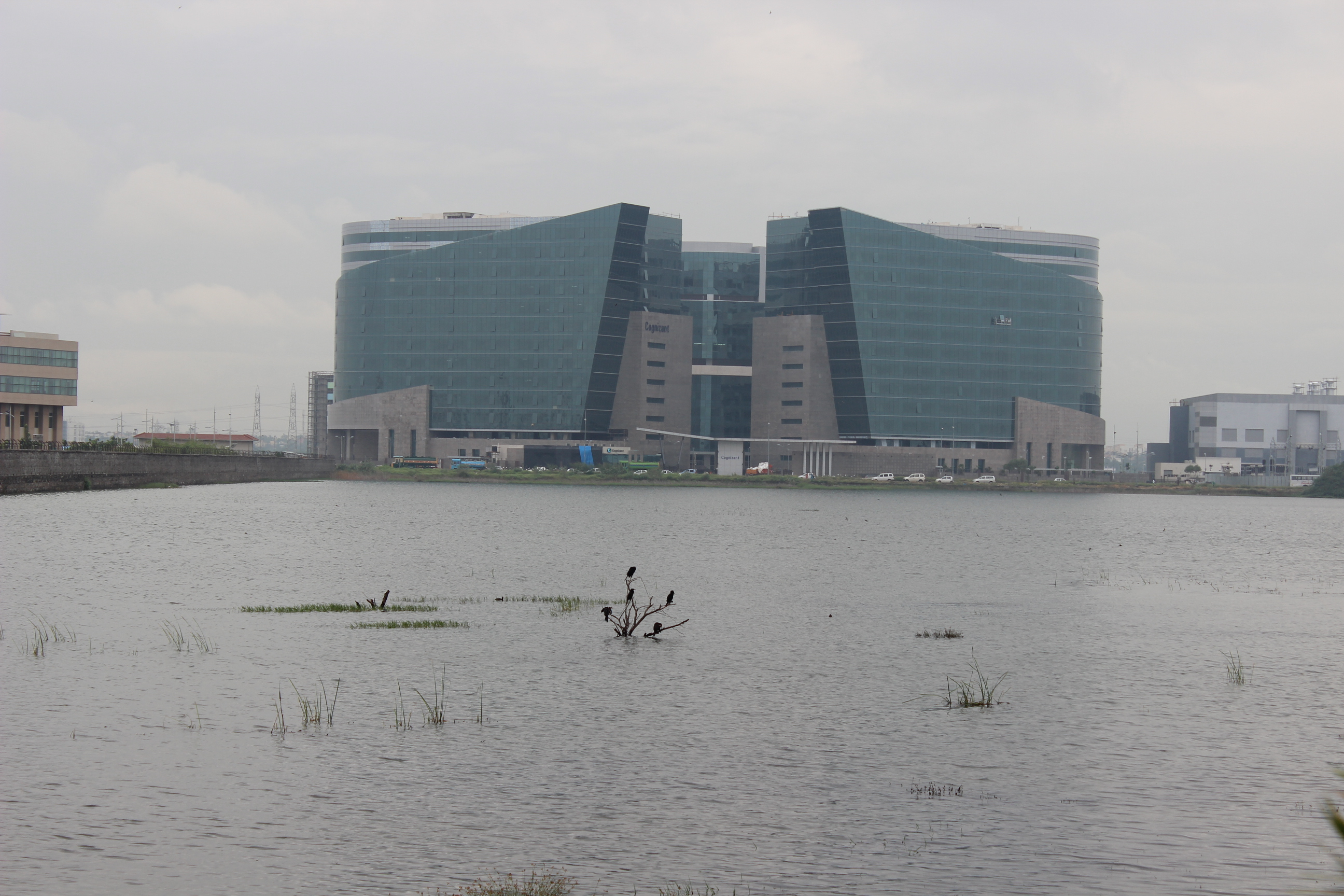
Cognizant at Pallikaranai

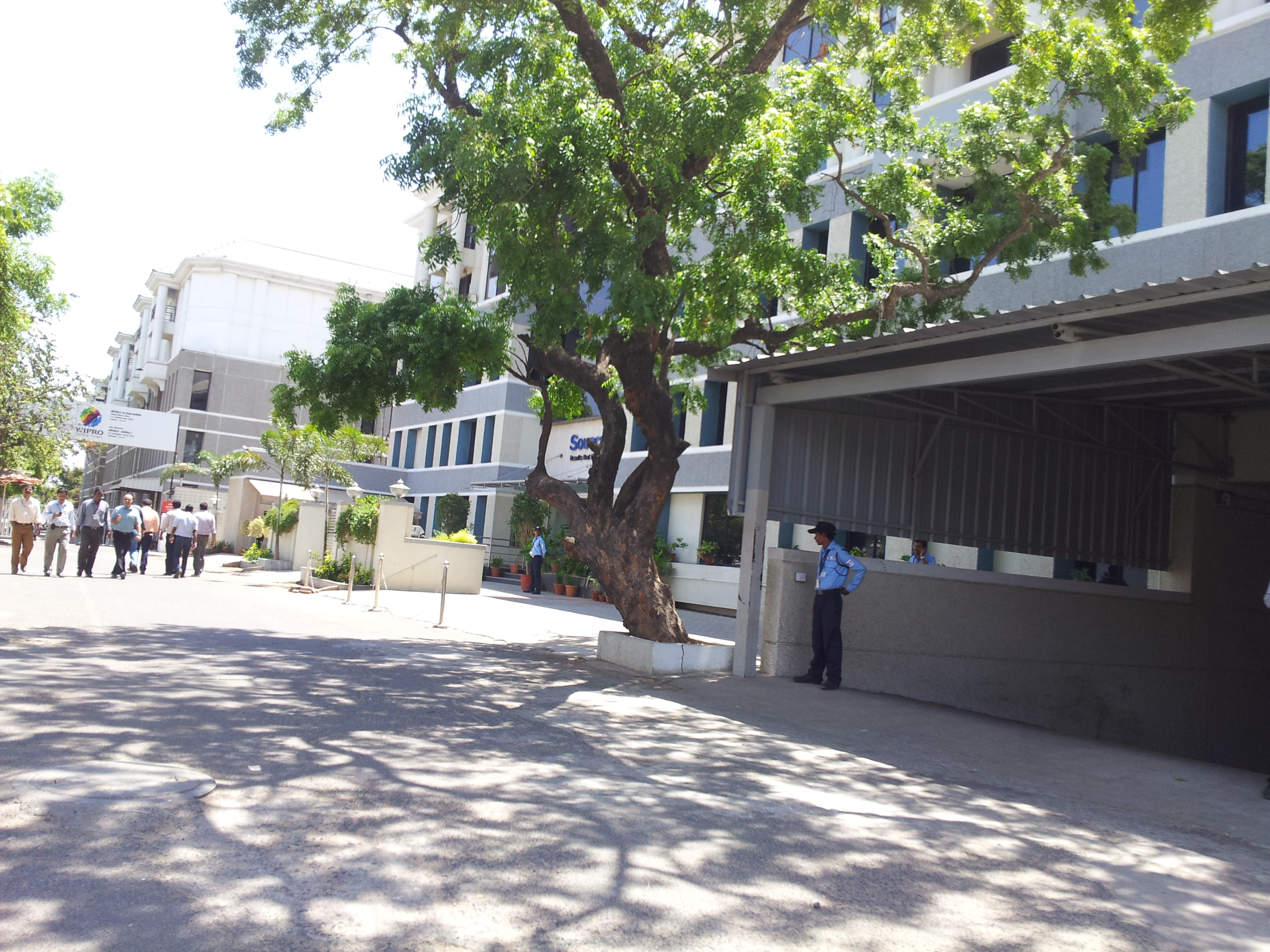
Wipro

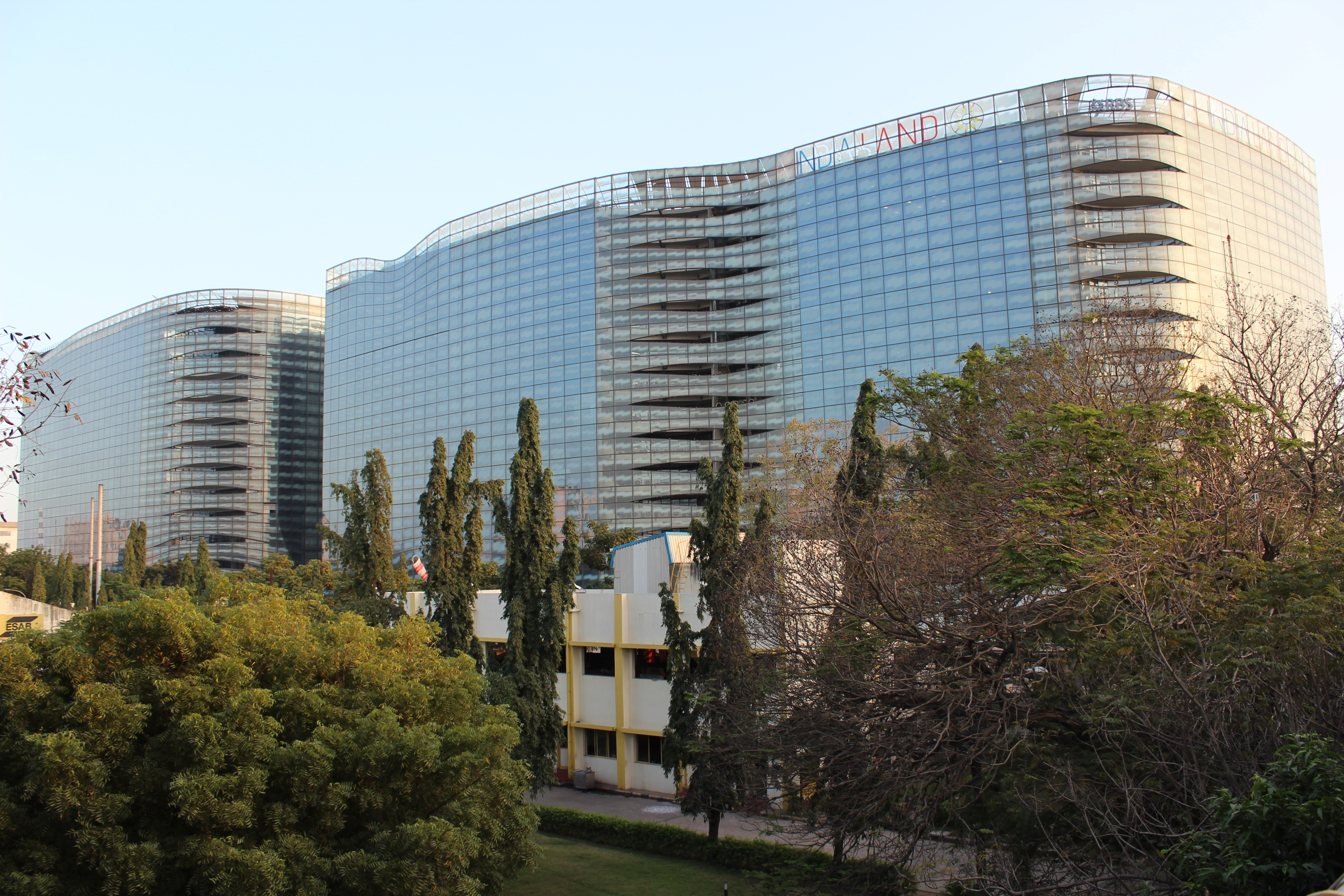
One Indiabulls Park

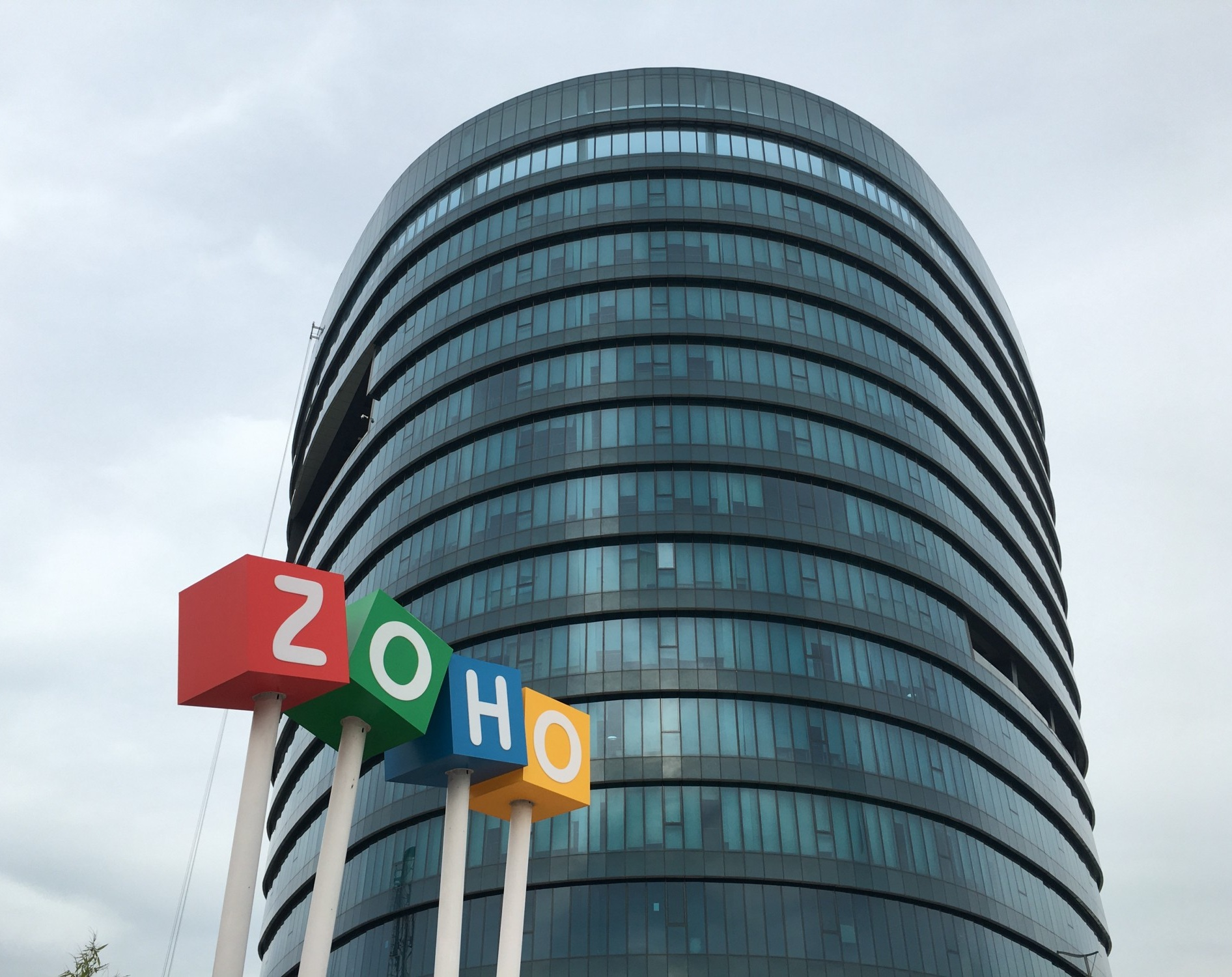
Zoho Corporation

Company name	Lakh sqft	Address	Investment	Start date current status	Notable clients			
TIDEL Park	15	Taramani		2000	Cisco Systems, Sify, Tenneco, Trimble			
TIDEL Park Pattabiram (Phase 1)	5.57	Pattabiram (Avadi)	230 crores	2024				
International Tech Park, Chennai	20	Taramani		2011	Amazon, Siemens, Caterpillar, Inautix, Visual Graphics, Dow Corning			
Olympia Tech Park	13	Guindy	240	2006	HP, Verizon, ABN Amro, Visteon, Hewitt, Merril, AIGSS, Force10 Networks, iSharp, RBS, DXC			
Mahindra World City, New Chennai				2002	Infosys, BMW, Braun, TTK Group, Capgemini, Njmestronics, Renault-Nissan, Tech Mahindra, Wabco, NTN, Husky, Lincoln Electric, Timken, cyber vole and TVS Group			
SRM Tech Park		Potheri		2008				
Bahwan CyberTek IT Park	1.8	Thoraipakkam		2006	Zafin Labs, Beroe Consulting India, Identiv Technologies India			
IITM Research Park	8.2	Taramani		2008	ZedBee Technologies Private Limited, Chakra Network Solutions, Saint-Gobain, Centre of Excellence in Wireless Technology (CEWiT), Tata Consultancy Services, Cognizant Technology Solutions India, ARCI, AMADA Soft India, EPMCR, Maveric Systems, ThinkEquity, NMS, TCOE, GoodEarth Maritime, Madras Engineering Industries, Net Access (India), TATA Elxsi, Villgro, XMOS Semiconductor India, Converteam, Vortex Engineering, One Fourth Labs			
Ceedeeyes Tech Park	1.48	Thoraipakkam		2006	TCS			
Chennai One SEZ		Thoraippakkam		2006	Comcast India, TCS, SIEMENS (ATOS), Vembu Technologies, GMT, GDES, Sutherland, HCL, Polaris, Ford, Prodapt, Wells Fargo			
TEK Meadows	6.35	Sholinganallur, Taramani	5	2006	Aviva, EDS, Ford, Flextronics			
Quanta Engineers	0.89	Teynampet		2006	Kanbay (Cap Gemini)			
ASV suntech Park	4	Okkiyam Thoraipakkam		2006	Cognizant (CTS), Capgemini, Ajuba, US Technology, Cisco			
Marg Digital Zone II	2	Karappakkam	90	2006	TCS			
Marg square	2	Karappakkam		2006				
L&T Estancia IT SEZ		Guduvancheri, GST Road			Zoho Corporation			
Bascon IT park	1.2	T.Nagar		2006	Scope, Airtel, Irevna			
Prince Infocity	3	Kandanchavadi		2006	KLA Tencor, D&B Transunion, Maersk Global Service Centres			
Prince Info City II	8	Kandanchavadi		Completed	Proretention Technologies India, Prodapt Solutions, Tata Teleservices, Thinksoft Global Services, Atmel R&D India, Episource India, Birlasoft			
Arihant Technopolis	2.3	Perungudi		2006	HCL			
ASV Ramana Tech Park		37 & 38 Venkatnarayana Road Chennai -17		2007	DS - Simulia India			
A.R Foundations - Acropolis	2.1	149. Dr. Radhakrishnan Salai Mylapore		2007	Oracle, Geo logistics, Thomson Reuters, Visual Graphics India/Mckinsey & Company Global F&A SSC			
Pioneer Asia - Tamarai Tech Park	4.4	Guindy Industrial Estate		2007	Dow Chemicals, Ericsson India Global Services, ABCO Advisory Services India, Softura			
ETA Ascon - (ETA Tech Park-SEZ)	4.4	Chennai-SEZ ETA-Navalur		2007	HCL			
Ramaniyam - Baid Hi-Tech Park	0.8	Tiruvanmiyur		2007	Extreme Networks, TnQ Books & Journals			
Appaswamy/XS real - The futura	5.7	334 OM Road (opp MTL) Sholinganallur		2007	PayPal, MBit Wireless			
Rayala corporation - Rayala Technopark	1.4	Kottivakkam		2007	Alcatel, e4e, R Systems International Limited, Beroe Consulting India Pvt. Ltd.			
Citilights freedom/pacifica	11	Navalur		2008				
RMZ Millenia - Phase II	17	Taramani		2008	Flex, Ford, Shell, Saipem			
MPL SILICON TOWERS	1.6	Pallikaranai		2009	Barry Wehmiller, Prizm, Scintel			
Prince Info Park (IT)	3	Ambattur Industrial Estate		Completed	Poletus Bics Global, Optimus, Slash Support, Datamark Prodapt, Lasersoft, Sparsh BPO, Intelenet and First Source.			
Global Infocity (Mapletree)	18	Kandanchavadi		Completed	World Trade Centre	18	Perungudi Completed	Ericsson Global, Hapag-Lloyd, Amazon, Lister Technologies, Saksoft, HSBC, Citi, QBurst, Siemens, Ripit solutions, ViaSat, Ford, Hcl
Prince foundations - Technopark	3	Semmencherry		UC				
Aroha e-serve	0			Planning				
Allied Investments & housing - (unnamed)	3	Ekattur		PLANNING				
Prestige Polygon IT park			1500	2013	Durr, RR Donneley			
DLF—IT park (SEZ)	70	Porur		2007	Boeing India, eNTRUST, Aptiv, L&T Technology Services, L&T Infotech, Groupon, PearsonEnglish, TCS, iGate Patni, IBM, Symantec, NTT Data, Zifo Rnd Solutions, E-serve, CSC, Dell Services, Syntel, Secova, Petrofac, Virtusa, GRO, Photon Interactive, Plintron Mobility Solutions, Cognizant, Sutherland, Mphasis, Technosoft, Logica, Barclays, Thirdware, MulticoreWare			
Embassy Splendid Tech Zone	40	Pallavaram		Completed	BNY Mellon, Finserv			
Alliance Orchid Tech Park	2.5	Ambattur		PLANNING				
TNPL	4	Ambattur	80	PLANNING				
Puravankara Primus	1.71	148, OMR, Okkiyam, Thoraipakkam, Chennai-96		Completed				
Narendra Properties- Devi		LB road		PLANNING				
RMZ Guindy (HTPL Site)	16	Guindy		PLANNING				
Navin's WSS Towers		107, Harris Road, (erstwhile Chitra Talkies), Mount Road, Chennai-600 002, Call: 9841046609		Completed	HCL, ONGC			
RCTECH		3D, Mercury Apartments, Pantheon Road, Egmore, Chennai – 600 008. India						
Ramky wavoo developers	2.5	Siruseri		UC				
Olympia Tech Park II-Pallavaram	8	Pallavaram		PLANNING				
ceebros - IT park		Thorappakkam		PLANNING				
Vishranthi homes Oceanic tech park	3	40 South Canal Bank Santhome		UC				
S.P. Ramesh IT City	2.18	LB Road, Tiruvanmiyur		UC				
Rattha co - TEK heights				UC				
ROVERCO (rattha)- Times square	3.25	MRC Nagar		UC				
RR Towers Industries phase 4	2.2	Guindy industrial estate		Completed				
TVH - Agnitio	6	Perungudi		Completed				
KG Builders - 360 degrees	2	232/1 Dr. MGR SalaiNorth Veeranam Salai OMR Bypass Road Perungudi		Completed	Temenos			
Bharathkumar Kamdar - (Prince Tech park?)	1.9	Thoraippakkam		UC				
Maansarovar properties - Techno creek	2.5	Kottivakkam		UC				
Ceebros (Seshachalam building??)	2.3	76 Anna salai Teynampet		UC				
Bhanumathi & others - (unnamed)	0.93	Perungudi		UC				
Rajiv Sampat & others (co??) - (unnamed)	0.8	402/403 Pantheon Rd Egmore		UC				
Keyaram Hotels - (unnamed)	1.09	1 Harrington Rd Chetpet		UC				
R. Ramanathan (co??) - (unnamed)	0.71	70 Spurtank Rd Chetpet		UC				
Lancor Gesco - (unnamed)	2	Alwarpet		UC				
Exceed ESPEE IT park	1.86	ekkaduthangal guindy industrial estate		Completed	Calsoft Labs, Lycatel, Triplepoint			
Pradeep Bhandari (co??) - unnamed	0.7	Whites Road Royappet						
Chaitanya group - (unnamed)	0.6	venkatnarayana rd T.Nagar		UC				
Arihant insight	3.3	PlotNo.24 Ambattur Industrial Estate		UC				
ESPEE IT Park	1.3	Plot-5 NP Jawaharlal Nehru road, Chennai		UC				
ESTRA SEZ	45	Porur - Ayyapanthangal Opposite Ramachandra Medical College (Will be employing 50,000 people)		UC				
TCG group/WS - IT park	1.7	Porur		UC	HP has taken up this whole IT Park			
Vishranthi homes Jayanth Techpark	2.4	Porur - Nandambakkam		Completed	HTML Global Solutions (1200 Seats), Larsen & Toubro Limited Global Engineering Services			
Mayfair Exports - (unnamed)	1.24	Porur - Manappakkam		UC				
Shanthi Builders - (unnamed)	2.08	113/114 Kamaraj Salai Mylapore		UC				
Ramaniyam - Bristol	0.8	Guindy		Completed	Airtel, India Property, HQ10			
Akshaya Homes - stanz park	1.9	Kazhipattur		UC				
Ascendas Mahindra city IT park	10.5	Mahindra city		UC				
Reliance Tech Park	4	Koyambedu		UC				
Shriram The Gateway SEZ	50	Perungalathur, GST Road	2500	2008	Accenture, Redington, Sutherland, Mahindra Satyam, ReDIM Information Systems, Mobius, Sybrant, Take, Trianz, Redington			
RR skyline	24	Ambattur industrial Estate	510	UC				
Alpha city -SSPDL	4.8	Navalur		2008	IBM-Daksh, National Management School, Newt Global, Psibertech Solutions			
Ramaniyam - Kamak towers	0.5	Ekkaduthangal		Completed	Contus (company), GE Countrywide, Converteam			
Arihant - (unnamed)	1.4	Tiruvanmiyur		UC				
Ampa Infospace	5	Nelson Manickam Rd	105	UC				
Ramaniyam Greeta	2.8	Perungudi		Completed				
Global Infocity	2.7	Perungudi Tharamani Link Road off OMR (Old Mamallapuram Road)		Completed	Amazon.com, Chronus Corporation, Athenahealth, SolarWinds, Lister Technologies, ChargeBee, TechAfiinityGlobal			
Menakur Infrastructure (e-Platinum)	8	Navalur		UC				
Prestige Cybertowers	5	Sholinganallur		UC				
Robin estates Bridgetown IT park	1.25	OMR		UC				
Indus cityscape - Techscape towers	2.5	OMR		UC				
Rattha Tek Towers			250	Completed				
Jayasree Financiers - (unnamed)	1.43	Sholinganallur		UC				
R.Rajagopal (co??) - (unnamed)	1.4	Okkiam Torappakkam		UC				
Harindar singh & others (co??) - (unnamed)	1.73	Okkiam Torappakkam		UC				
Tirupurasundhari & others (co??) - (unnamed)	1.3	Pallikaranai		UC				
Aravind IT park	0.5	Karappakkam		UC				
Landmarvel IT park		Siruseri		UC				
Maansarovar properties - Maan sarovar Heights	3.9	Semmenchery		UC				
Resurgent Investments- (unnamed)	1.9	Sholinganallur		UC				
Ambattur Clothing Co (The Ambit)	12	Ambattur		2008	CSS, iOpEx			
Appaswamy/Chaitanya - e-gate	2.5	292 OM Road Sholinganallur		UC				
KK agarwal co - (unnamed)	2.4	Sholinganallur		UC				
Krishnan Sivagami Trust	0.98	Keelkottaiyur village (Kelambakkam)		UC				
Arun Fabricators - (unnamed)	1.6	Navalur		UC				
Kerry jost engg co - (unnamed)	1.5	Ambattur industrial estate		UC				
Yekediar farms - (unnamed)	2.1	Okkiam Torappakkam		UC				
Matrix towers - (SSPDL)	2.5	Perungudi		Completed				
Succons OKI Infotech Park	1.20	Navallur						
One IndiaBulls Park	24	Ambattur Industrial Estate		2010	Royal Bank of Scotland, Vodafone Essar, Telebuy, KONE Elevators, Dell, HCL, TCS and ICICI Bank - Head office			
TECCI Park	6	OMR, Karapakkam, Chennai-600083		Completed	Uninor, Vestas, Valeo, First source, Qmax, Pathfinder.			

== See also ==
- List of tech parks in Kolkata
- Software industry in Chennai
