= ITPC =

ITPC may refer to:

- International Tech Park, Chennai, a high-tech park in Taramani district of Chennai, India
- Iraqi Telecommunications and Post Company, a government-owned and operated corporation responsible for providing telecommunication and mail services in Iraq
- ITPC, an application protocol used by iTunes for podcasts
- ITPC : IT Project Circle of Bharat Sanchar Nigam Limited
