= Software industry in Chennai =

Third largest software exporter in India

Chennai is the third largest software exporter in India, next to Bengaluru and Hyderabad. India's largest IT park is housed at Chennai. Software exports from Tamil Nadu during 2017–2018 rose 8.8% per cent to touch 1,11,179 crore, involving a workforce of 780,000, and the city is the hub for deep tech startup companies. Many software and software services companies have development centres in Chennai, which contributed 14 percent of India's total software exports of ₹ 14,42,140 lakh during 2006–07, making it the third largest Indian city software exporter following Bengaluru, Hyderabad and the city is the home for 7 top rated IT companies out of 15 in India. The Tidel Park in Chennai was billed as Asia's largest IT park when it was built. Major software companies have their offices set up here, with some of them making Chennai their largest base. Chennai is the largest hub for e-publishing, as there are 67 e-publishing units registered with the STPI and many Rs.8300-Cr data centers, digital hubs are in the process of development. A major reason for the growth of the Software industry are the top engineering colleges in Tamil Nadu, of which Chennai is a major contributor, have been a major recruiting hub for the IT firms. According to estimates, these engineering colleges and universities consistently generate about 50 per cent of the human resource requirements for the IT and ITES industry was being sourced from the state, particularly from Chennai. The total employment in the Tamil Nadu’s technology sector crossed the one million (10 lakh) mark in the quarter ended June 2022.

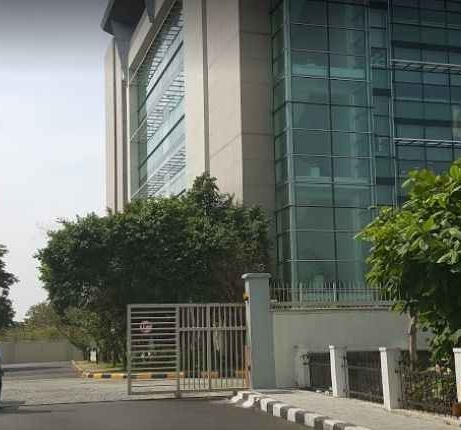
World Bank Office in Chennai

Since the late 1990s, software development and business process outsourcing and more recently electronics manufacturing have emerged as major drivers of the city's economic growth. Chennai has been rated as the most attractive Indian city for offshoring services according to A T Kearney's Indian City Services Attractiveness Index 2005. After Bengaluru Chennai leads No. 2 in software space absorption.

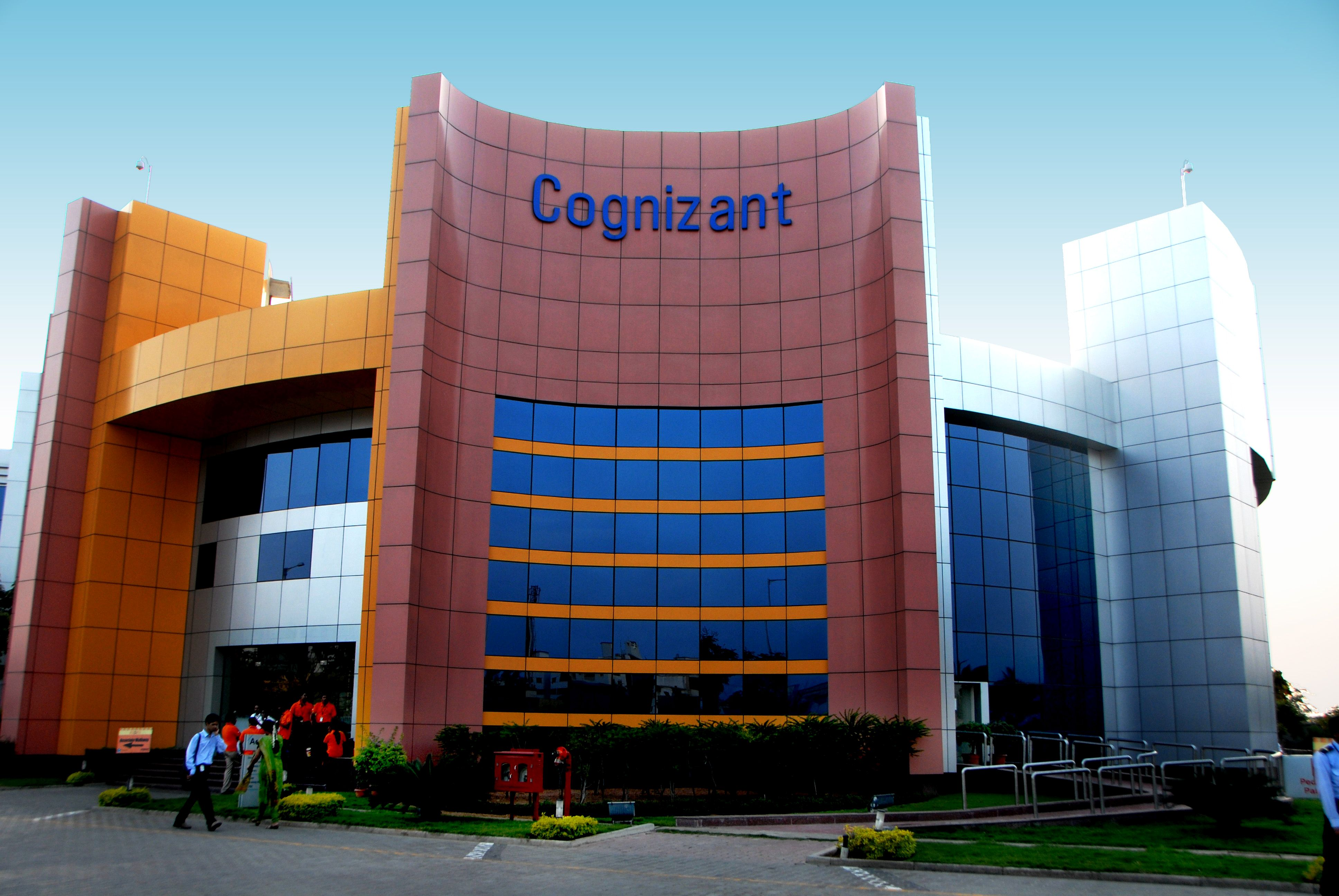
Cognizant's corporate headquarters in Chennai

== Major software companies in Chennai ==
Major software and software services companies including Capgemini Engineering, Accenture, Cognizant, Capgemini, DXC Technology, SAP SE, Oracle Corporation, Cisco Systems, HCL Technologies, Hewlett Packard Enterprise, IBM, CGI Inc., Infosys, Sopra Steria, Gen Digital, Tata Consultancy Services, Verizon, Wipro, Virtusa, UST Global, Atos, Dassault Systèmes, Fujitsu, NTT Data, LTI, Honeywell, VMware, Intel, Amazon, Tech Mahindra, Fiserv, Adobe Inc., AT&T, Philips, AstraZeneca, Wolters Kluwer, TransUnion, Ernst & Young, L&T Technology Services, Mindtree, Shell plc, Athenahealth, Ford Global Technology & Business Center, Ramco Systems, Optimum Infosystem, Deloitte, Microsoft, Temenos AG, Tech4LYF Corporation, Synechron: Technology and AI Consulting for Business, KPMG, PayPal have development centres in the city. The city is now the second largest exporter of IT and IT enabled Services in the country behind Bangalore.

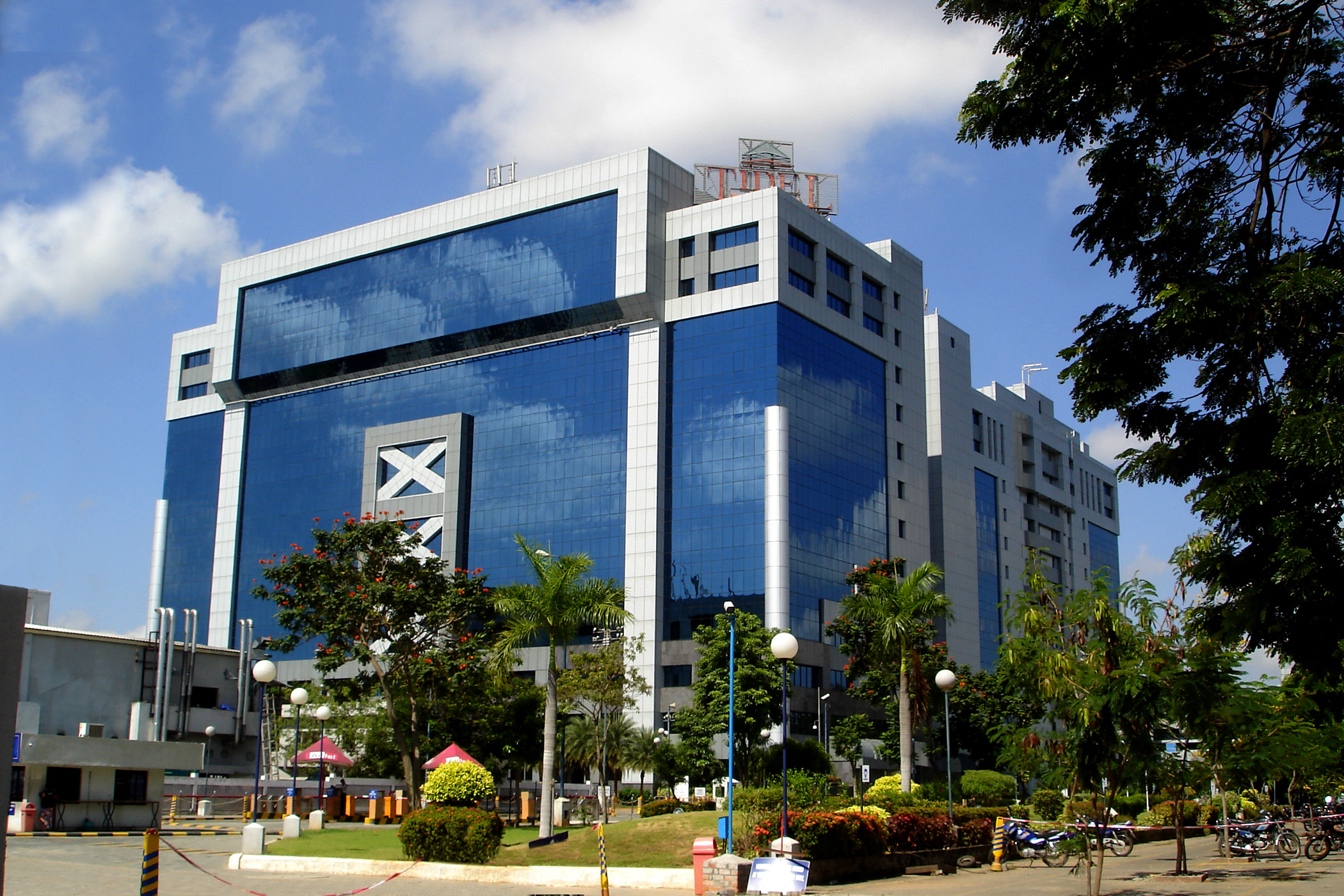
Tidel Park—one of the largest software parks in Asia—was set up on 4 July 2000 in Chennai.

The IT Corridor, on Old Mahabalipuram Road in the southeast of the city houses several technology parks, and, when completed, will provide employment to close to 300,000 people. Besides the existing Tidel Park, two more Tidel Parks are on the anvil in the IT corridor. One is under construction at the Siruseri IT Special Economic Zone ("SEZ") and the other one is being planned at the current location of MGR Film City which is just before the existing Tidel Park, in Taramani on the IT Corridor. A number of SEZ have emerged in and around Chennai. The Mahindra World City, Chennai, a Special Economic Zone (SEZ) with one of the world's largest high technology business zones, is currently under construction in the outskirts of Chennai. It also includes the World's largest IT Park by Infosys.

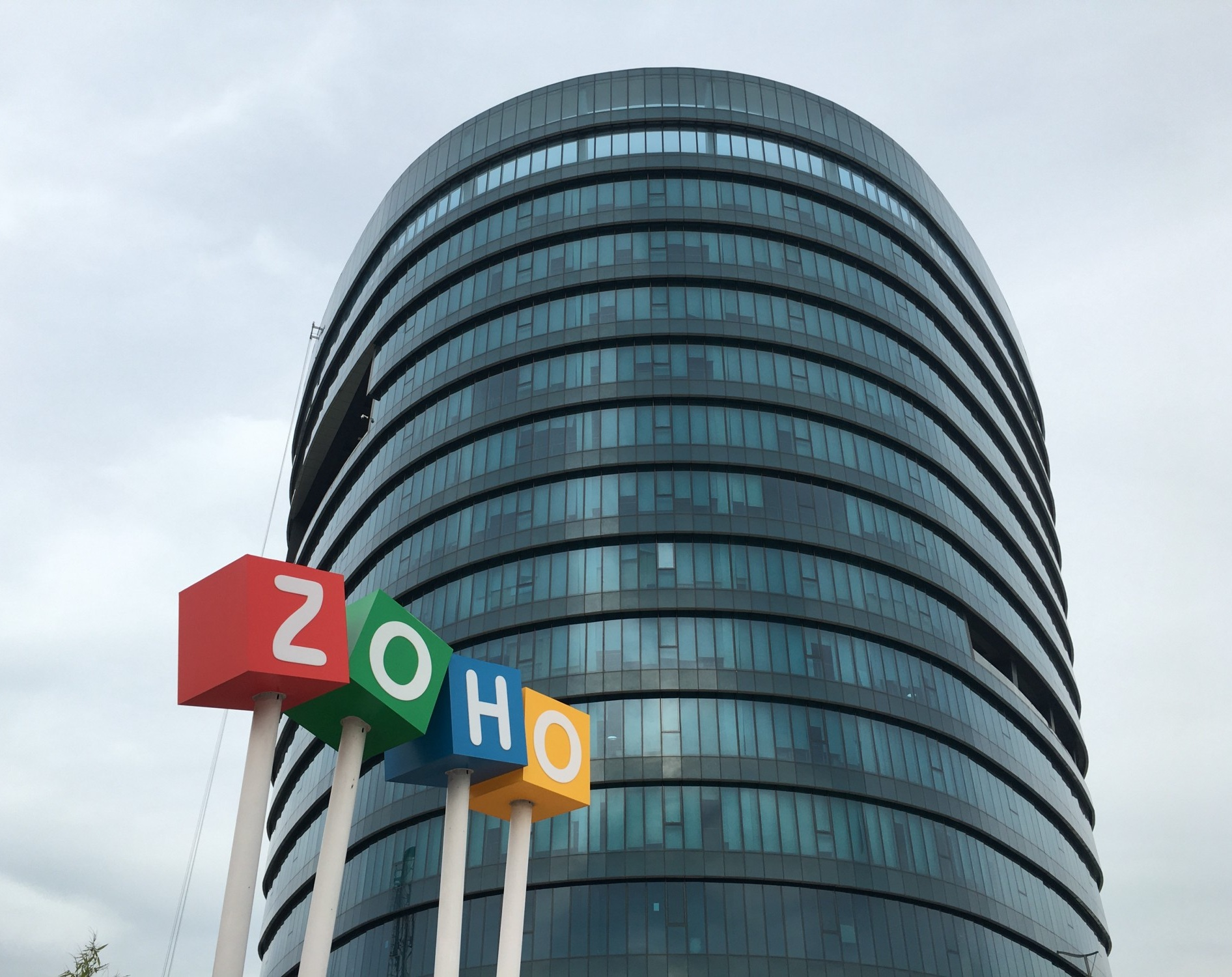
Zoho headquarters in Chennai

== Special economic zones ==
A number of Special Economic Zones (SEZ) projects has emerged along the Grand Southern Trunk Road (NH 45), making it the SEZ corridor of Chennai. It includes MEPZ SEZ established in 1984, Mahindra World City, Chennai, Shriram Properties's Gateway SEZ, Estancia SEZ and ETL Infrastructure. It is also emerging as a major IT SEZ region with a number of huge investments by Infosys. Infosys has set up its largest development center in Mahindra SEZ while India Land Tech Park is developing a massive 500-acre (2.0 km^{2}) SEZ which is estimated to have 20,900,000 sq ft (1,940,000 m^{2}) office space for both IT and Electronics use. Shriram The Gateway SEZ, is an integrated township with IT/ITeS SEZ residential and mall, which is also home for IT majors like Accenture, ReDIM Information Systems, later the IT park is expanded to 4.6 million sft in association with Xander Group and EISL is an IT/ITES SEZ by ETL Infrastructure at Chengalpattu on 260 acres (1.1 km^{2}) is in the process of development.

== Software backend services ==
Chennai houses the permanent back office of the World Bank, which is one of the largest buildings owned by the bank outside its headquarters in Washington, D.C. The Chennai office, administrative and IT services of the bank, including the bank's software based analytical work in bond valuation which is estimated to be US$100 billion.

== Software as a service ==
Chennai has emerged as the "SaaS Capital of India" (SaaS is jargon for "software as a service". The SaaS sector in/around Chennai generated US$1 billion in revenue and employed about 10000 personnel in 2018.

== See also ==
- DLF Cybercity Chennai
- TIDEL Park
- SIPCOT IT Park
- International Tech Park, Chennai
- Olympia Tech Park
- One Indiabulls Park
- Economy of Chennai
- Information technology in India
- List of Indian IT companies
