= TIDEL Park =

Tech Park in Chennai, India

Coordinates: 12.9896946°N 80.2487258°E

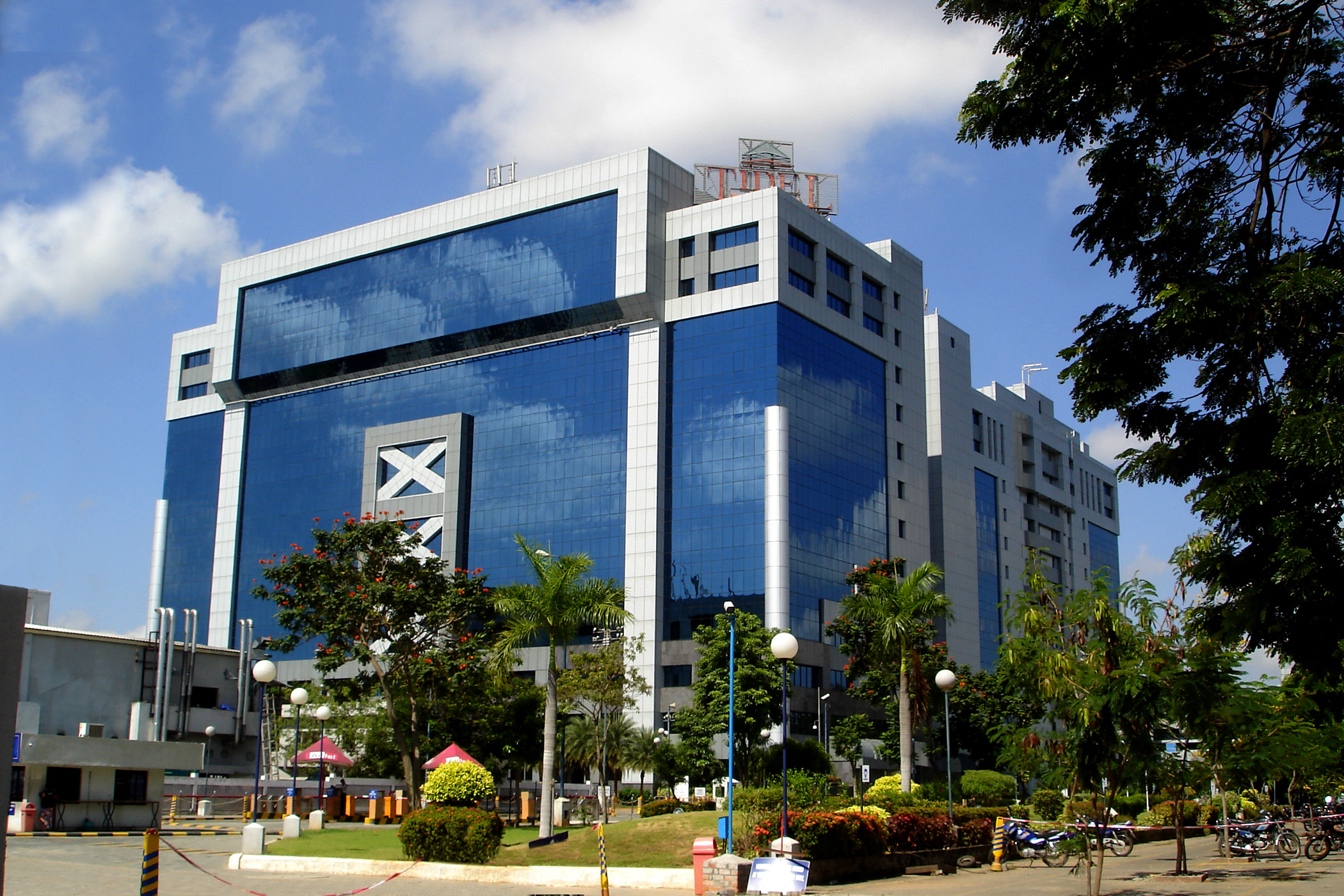
- Front facade
- Interactive map of the TIDEL Park area

General information
- Type: IT Special Economic Zone
- Location: Taramani, Chennai, India, 4, Rajiv Gandhi Salai
- Construction started: 1998
- Completed: 2000
- Inaugurated: 4 July 2000
- Cost: ₹3.2 billion (equivalent to ₹14 billion or US$140 million in 2023)
- Owner: TIDEL Park Limited

Height
- Roof: 169.55 ft (51.68 m)
- Top floor: 12

Technical details
- Floor count: 15
- Floor area: 1,280,000 ft^{2} (119,000 m^{2})
- Lifts/elevators: 19

Design and construction
- Architect: CRN Architects
- Developer: TIDCO and ELCOT
- Main contractor: Hyundai Engineering

TIDEL Park is an information technology (IT) park in Chennai, India. It is located on Rajiv Gandhi Salai in the southern locality of Taramani. The building was developed by the Tamil Nadu government agencies TIDCO and ELCOT. It was opened in 2000, and was amongst the first and largest IT parks in South Asia.

== Location ==
TIDEL Park is located along the Rajiv Gandhi Salai in the southern suburb of Taramani in Chennai. It is located close to the high traffic junction of the road connecting Thiruvanmiyur, opposite to Thiruvanmiyur railway station on the Chennai MRTS line.

== Planning and construction ==
The Government of Tamil Nadu planned to establish an Information technology (IT) Special Economic Zone in the late 1990s to cater to the growth of the industry. The government assigned TIDCO and ELCOT for the planning of the project. In 1996, suitable locations were scoured and plans were made to utilise eight acres of state land in Taramani. The foundation stone for the construction was laid on 21 August 1998. The building was constructed by Hyundai Engineering. It was inaugurated by then Indian prime minister Vajpayee on 4 July 2000.

== Financials ==
The project was built at an estimated cost of ₹3.2 billion (equivalent to ₹14 billion or US$150 million in 2023). The project had an equity share of ₹0.94 billion (US$9.8 million), of which ₹0.4 billion (US$4.2 million) was held by the state government. The project has a debt to equity ratio of 2.4:1 and the remaining cost was financed through debt.

== Design ==
The building has a built up area of 1,280,000 ft^{2} (119,000 m^{2}) including about 850,000 ft^{2} (79,000 m^{2}) of office space. The park was amongst the first and largest IT parks in South Asia. The building is divided into eight sections, four each on north and south sides of the structure. The front and back sections are separated by an atria in the middle. The building has 13 floors including the ground floor and two additional basement floors. It is equipped with 19 elevators and 2 escalators. The design of the building provides office space of various sizes ranging from 4,000–9,000 ft^{2} (370–840 m^{2}).

The building has a 650-seat auditorium, a 130-seat conference hall, and a 16,000 ft^{2} (1,500 m^{2}) food court. There is a parking space for 4,000 two-wheeler and 1,200 cars in the basement. The building is equipped with central air conditioning, a telephone exchange, and dedicated internet lines. An integrated building management system is used for the management of the building. Electricity is provided by the Tamil Nadu Electricity Board through a dedicated substation.

== Other projects ==
Several other TIDEL Parks have been established across the state. In 2010, a TIDEL park was established in Coimbatore. Spanning 914,000 ft^{2} (84,900 m^{2}), it was built at a cost of ₹4.07 billion (equivalent to ₹9.1 billion or US$95 million in 2023). The park was built on a 9.5 acres (3.8 ha) plot near arterial Avinashi road in Peelamedu. Conceived in August 2006, foundation stone for the Park was laid in February 2007, and the construction began in September 2008. The park has five floors apart from three underground floors. In 2024, a new TIDEL Park complex was opened in the western suburb of Pattabiram in Chennai. The 21-storey building spanning across 557,000 ft^{2} (51,700 m^{2}) was constructed at an estimated cost of ₹2.85 billion (US$30 million).

The state government has planned to expand the existing TIDEL Park in Coimbatore on an adjoining 9 acres (3.6 ha) plot at a cost of ₹2.5 billion (US$26 million). Parks have also been planned at other cities such as Madurai, Tiruchirappalli. Smaller neo parks have also been planned in Tiruppur, Vellore, Salem, Thanjavur, Thoothukudi, and Sivagangai with the first such park inaugurated in Villupuram in 2024.

== See also ==
- List of tallest buildings in Chennai
- Architecture of Chennai
- Software industry in Chennai
