= TIDEL Park Pattabiram =

Tech Park in Chennai, India

Coordinates: 13.12421°N 80.06073°E

TIDEL Park Pattabiram, Avadi
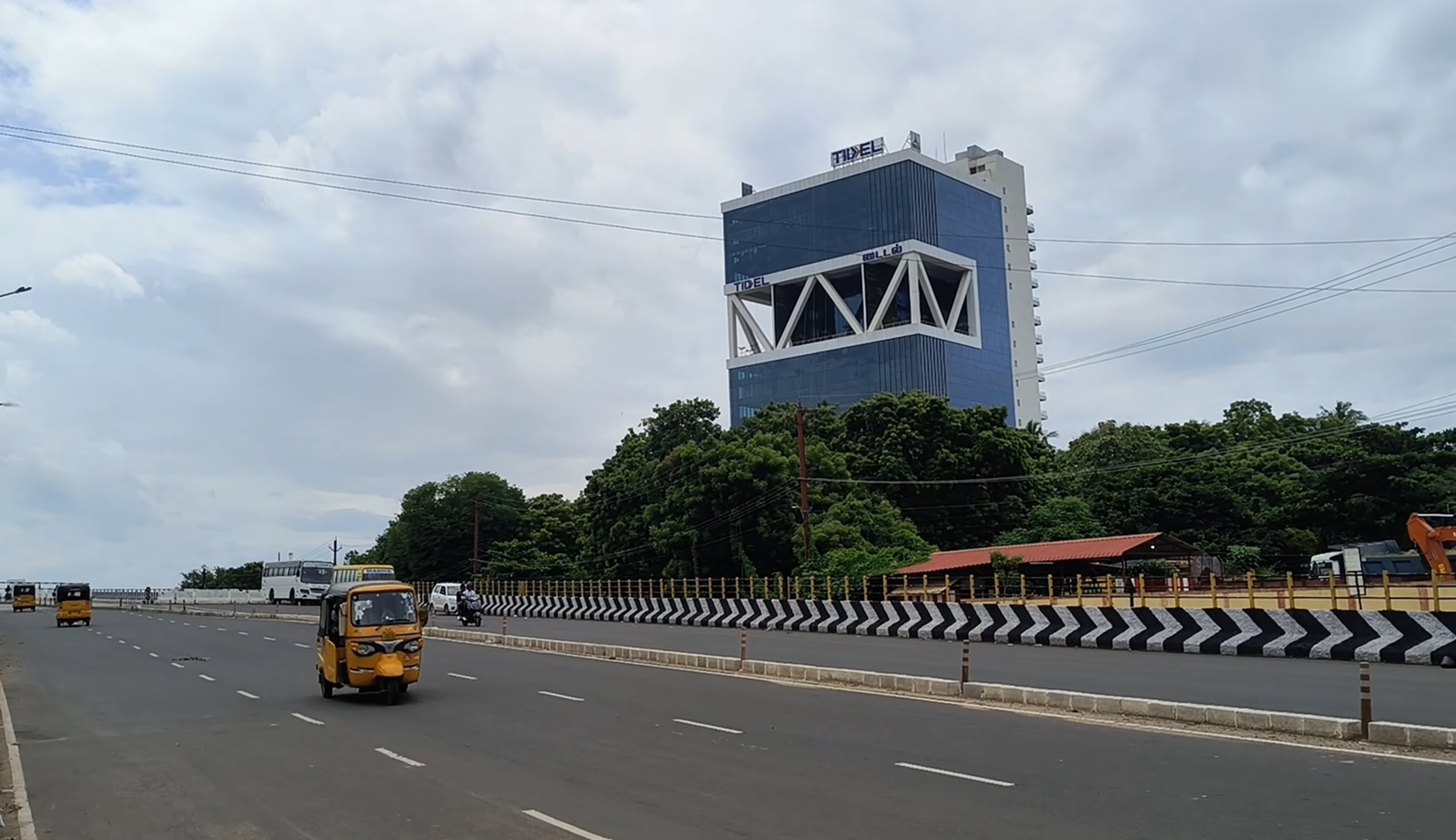
- View of TIDEL park from CTH Road
- Interactive map of the TIDEL Park Pattabiram, Avadi area

General information
- Type: Information Technology Park
- Location: Pattabiram, Avadi, Chennai, India, 43F6+G73, Chennai–Tiruvallur High Road, Pattabiram, Avadi, Chennai, Tamil Nadu 600 072, India
- Construction started: 2020
- Completed: 2024
- Inaugurated: 22 November 2024
- Cost: ₹ 3,300 million
- Owner: TIDEL Park Ltd

Height
- Roof: 60 m (200 ft)
- Top floor: 21

Technical details
- Floor count: 22
- Floor area: 557,000 sq ft (51,700 m^{2})

Design and construction
- Developer: TIDCO and ELCOT

TIDEL Park Pattabiram, Avadi is an information technology (IT) park in situated in the city of Chennai, India. The name TIDEL is a portmanteau of TIDCO and ELCOT. It became operational in November 2024 to foster the growth of information technology in the state of Tamil Nadu by the TIDEL Park Ltd, a joint venture of TIDCO and ELCOT.

== History and Location ==
The third TIDEL Park is located on the Chennai–Tiruvallur High Road in Pattabiram, Avadi a western suburb of Chennai. The idea of this TIDEL park was conceived in 2016 by the then Chief Minister J. Jayalalithaa and a 45-acre plot was selected at the suburb. The construction began in 2020 and was completed in 2024. The IT park was inaugurated in 2024 by the chief minister of Tamil Nadu M. K. Stalin.

== Infrastructure ==
The Pattabiram TIDEL Park is a 21-storied building constructed on a 11.41-acre plot. The building has a built-up area of 557,000 sq ft (51,700 m^{2}).

The IT park is capable of accommodating 6000 employees and has provisions for office spaces ranging from 6,000 sq. ft. to 100,000 sq. ft. Provisions in the building include complete DG backup, open car parking, auditorium, promotional spaces, meditation hall, EV charging stations, a medical center, and a multi-cuisine food court in a separate block on the campus. The building also features large murals in the main lobby, a gym and indoor games on the 12th floor, and a hanging garden between the 15th and 19th floors.

== See also ==
- List of tallest buildings in Chennai
- Architecture of Chennai
- Software Industry in Chennai
