= Tharamani =

- Neighbourhood
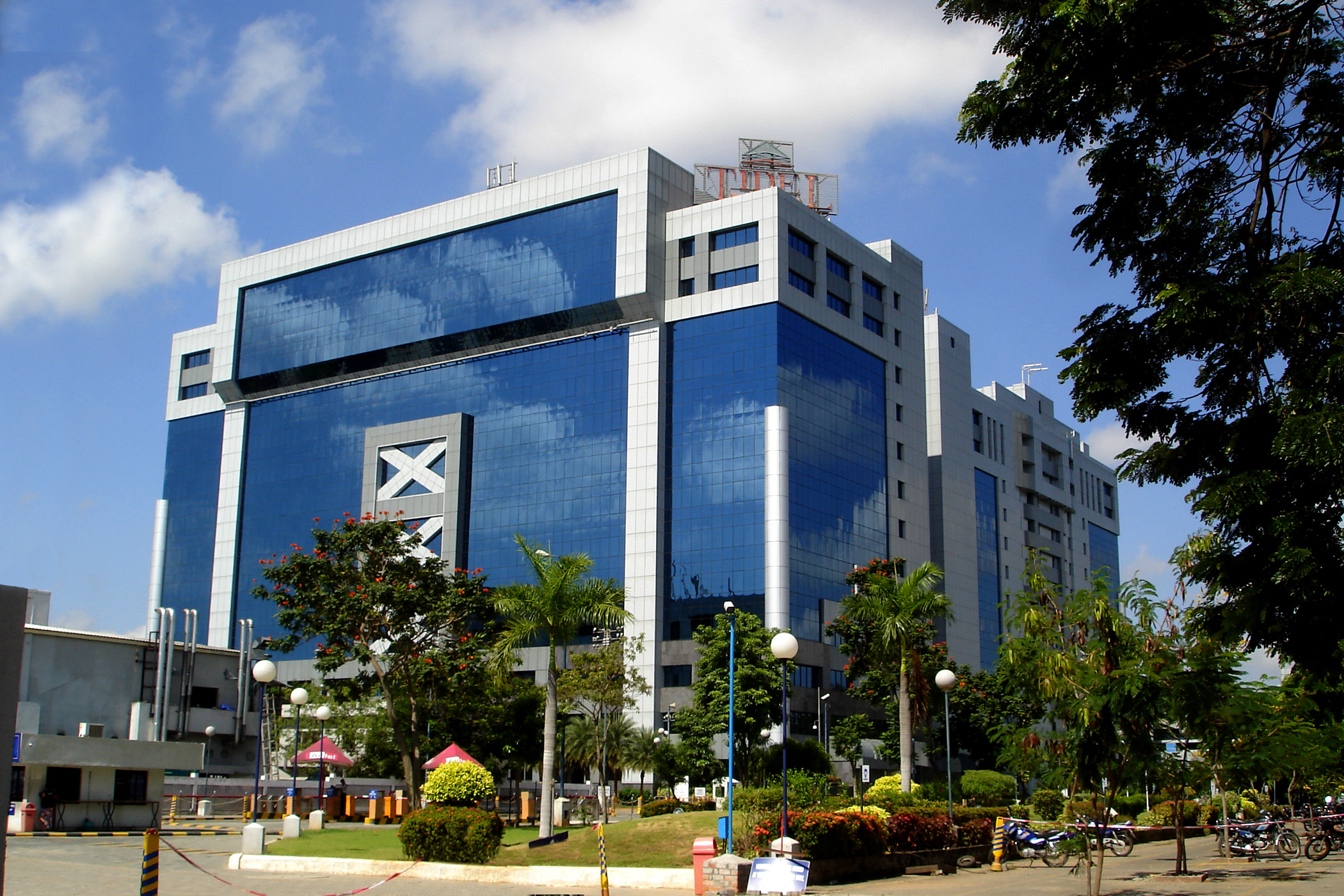
- TIDEL Park

- Tharamani (Chennai) Tharamani (Tamil Nadu) Tharamani (India)
- Coordinates: 12.9863°N 80.2432°E
- Country: India
- State: Tamil Nadu
- District: Chennai
- Metro: Chennai

Government
  - Body: Chennai Corporation
- Elevation: 20.5 m (67 ft)

Language
  - Official: Tamil
- Time zone: UTC+5:30 (IST)
- PIN: 600113
- Vehicle registration: TN-07
- Planning agency: CMDA
- Civic agency: Chennai Corporation
- Website: www.chennai.tn.nic.in

Tharamani is an area in the south Indian city of Chennai. It is known for the presence of the city's first IT parks and numerous government educational and research institutions. It is located adjacent to the posh residential area of Adyar and Besant Nagar in South Chennai. It is an Estate with Express IT Companies, making it a massive located neighbourhood in the IT Expressway.

== Location ==
The temple of Madhya Kailash, at the junction of the Old Mahabalipuram Road and Sardar Patel Road, marks the beginning of Tharamani. Tharamani adjoins Adyar, Besant Nagar, Thiruvanmiyur, Velachery and Perungudi. The arterial road, often described as an IT corridor, is Rajiv Gandhi Salai, formerly known as Old Mahabalipuram Road. Another important road in the area is the Tharamani Link Road which connects Tharamani with Velachery. It runs from SRP Tools Junction on Rajiv Gandhi Salai to Vijayanagar bus terminus in Velachery, where it merges with Velachery Main Road, which goes from Little Mount Junction in Saidapet to Tambaram via Medavakkam. This is being widened into a six-lane road because of the enormous increase in traffic.

== Educational and research institutions ==
Tharamani is home to several research labs and institutions such as:

- American International School–Chennai
- Adyar Film Institute
- Asian College of Journalism
- Central Polytechnic Chennai
- Central Leather Research Institute
- Central Electronics Engineering Research Institute
- University of Madras
- Institute of Mathematical Sciences
- Indian Institute of Technology, Madras
- Institute of Textile Technology, Madras
- Institute of Printing Technology, Madras
- Institute of Chemical Technology, Madras
- Institute of Polymer Technology, Madras
- Institute of Leather Technology, Madras
- MS Swaminathan Research Foundation
- National Environmental Engineering Research Institute
- National Institute of Fashion Technology
- National Institute of Technical Teachers' Training and Research, Chennai
- Tidel Park
- Society for Applied Microwave Electronics Engineering & Research (SAMEER)—Chennai
- The School of Excellence in Law, The Tamil Nadu Dr. Ambedkar Law University, Chennai
- IIT Research Park
- TICEL biopark

Japanese School Educational Trust of Chennai (チェンナイ補習授業校 Chennai Hoshū Jugyō Kō), a weekend Japanese school, is at American International School Chennai. It moved to AIS Chennai in 2003.

== Transport ==
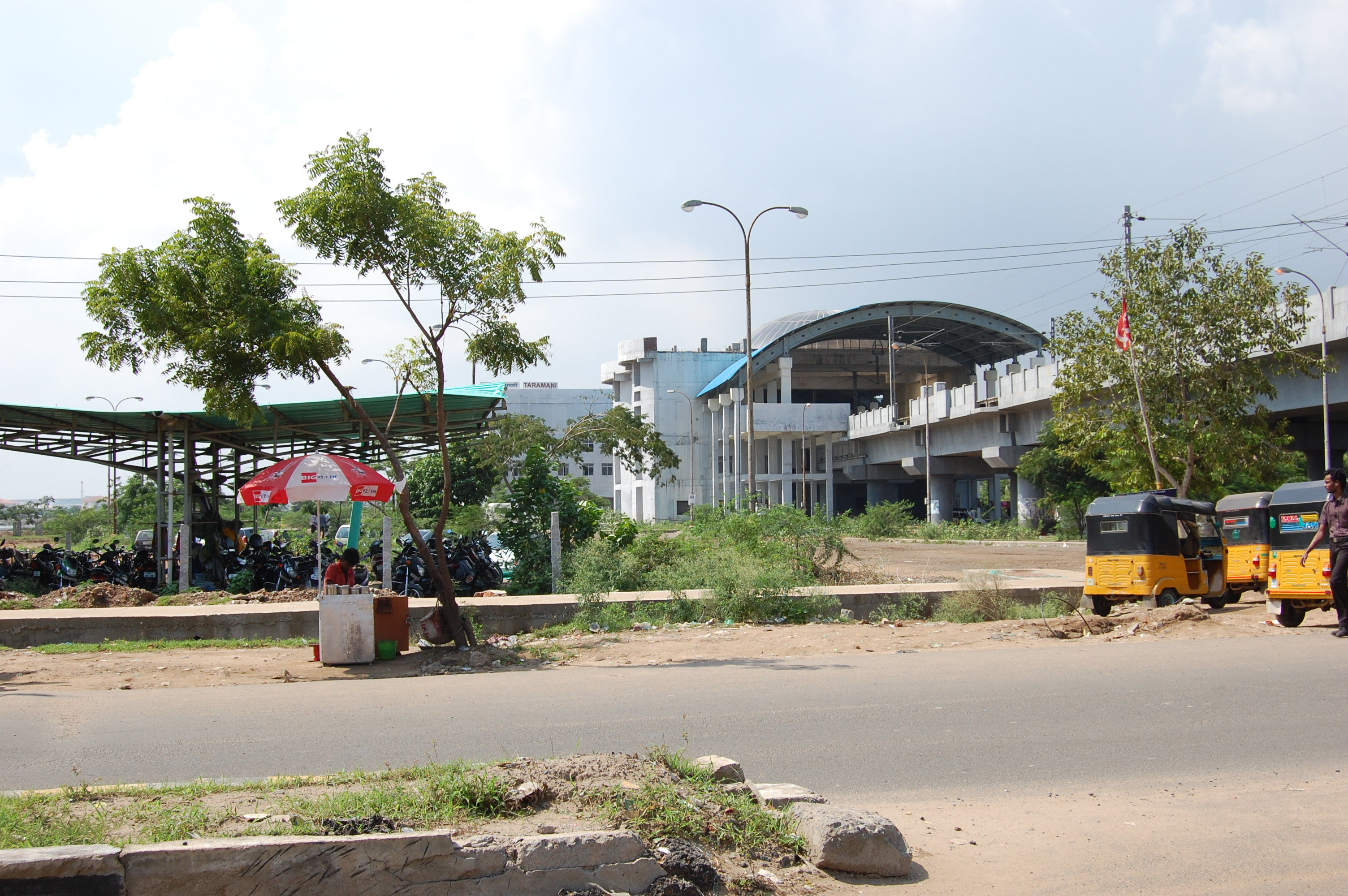
MRTS station at Taramani

There is a bus terminus in Tharamani. There are also two MRTS in the area, Thiruvanmiyur and Taramani.

== Film City ==
The MGR Film City was constructed in Tharamani in 1996. The Film City was a major project of Tamil Nadu Chief Minister J. Jayalalithaa during her first term in office. Recently, there have been news reports that it is being converted into a "Knowledge Park".

== Religion ==
There are several temple, mosque and churches in the area.
