= Tamil Nadu Industrial Development Corporation =

Government agency in Tamil Nadu, India

- Formation: 21 May 1965; 61 years ago
- Type: State owned
- Coordinates: 13.066486°N 80.259661°E
- Region served: Tamil Nadu
- Owner: Government of Tamil Nadu
- Website: tidco.com

Tamil Nadu Industrial Development Corporation (TIDCO) is a governmental agency in the state of Tamil Nadu, India. It is responsible for the development of industries in the state and often partners with companies in the Indian government's Small Industries Development Corporation program as TANSIDCO. The managing director is Sandeep Nanduri. It is also responsible for the formation of TPIPL, TICEL & TIDEL parks in partnership with ELCOT & SIPCOT.

TIDCO at 9th Bengaluru Space Expo 2026, BIEC

== History ==
TIDCO was established on 21 May 1965 as a wholly owned Government of Tamil Nadu enterprise. On 26 July 1984, TIDCO collaborated with the Tata Group and established Titan Watches Ltd., which has been known as Titan Company since 2013. Titan inaugurated its first watch factory in a SIPCOT promoted area in Hosur on 11 March 1988.
