= Thiruvanmiyur =

- neighbourhood
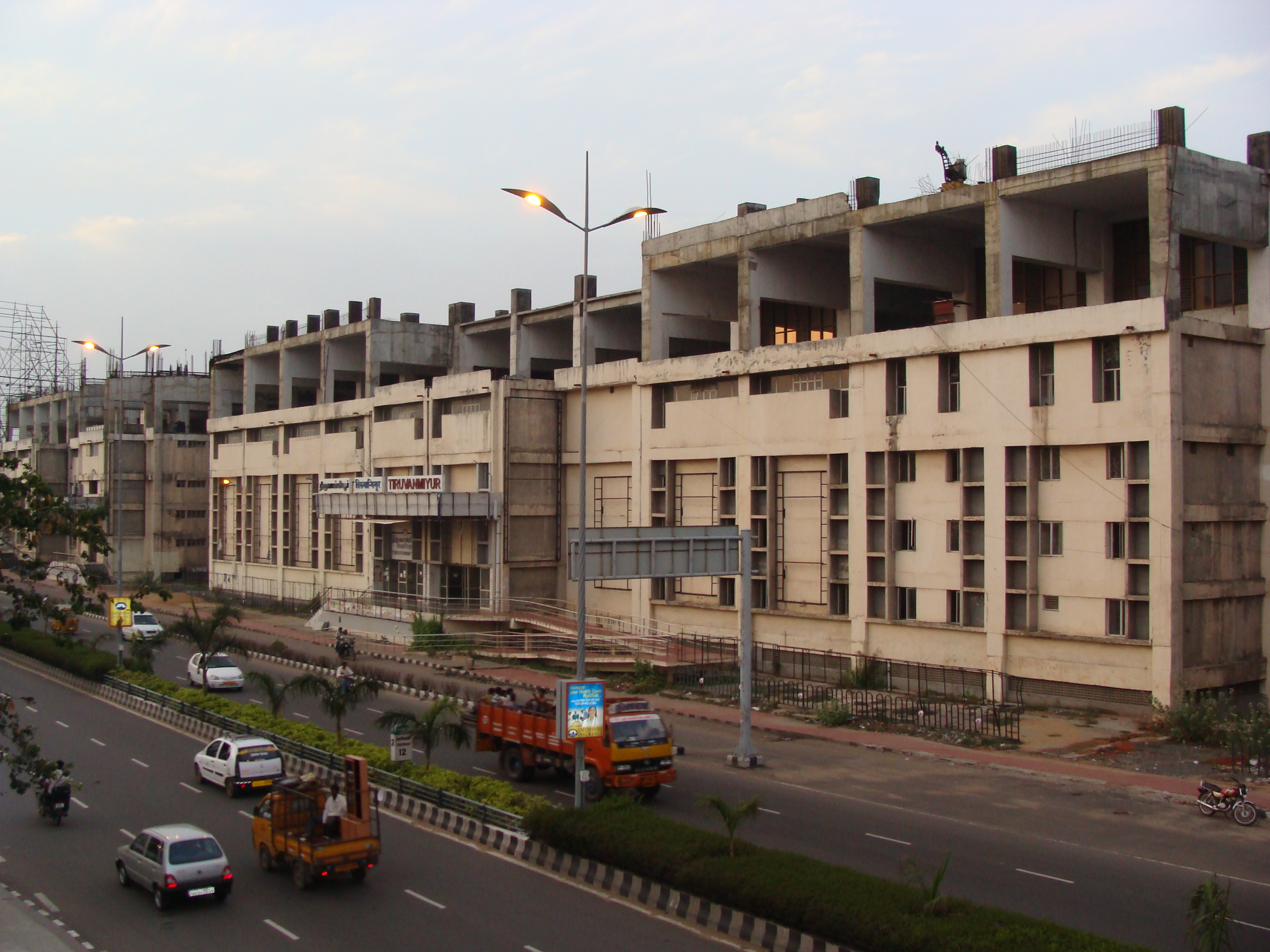
- Thiruvanmiyur MRTS station

- Location within Chennai Location within Tamil Nadu Location within India
- Coordinates: 12.9856°N 80.2614°E
- Country: India
- State: Tamil Nadu
- District: Chennai
- Taluk: Velachery
- Metro: Chennai
- Zone: Adyar
- Ward: 155

Languages
  - Official: Tamil
- Time zone: UTC+5:30 (IST)
- PIN: 600041
- Vehicle registration: TN-07
- Lok Sabha constituency: Chennai South
- Vidhan Sabha constituency: Velachery
- Website: https://tourismtn.com/thiruvanmiyur-beach/

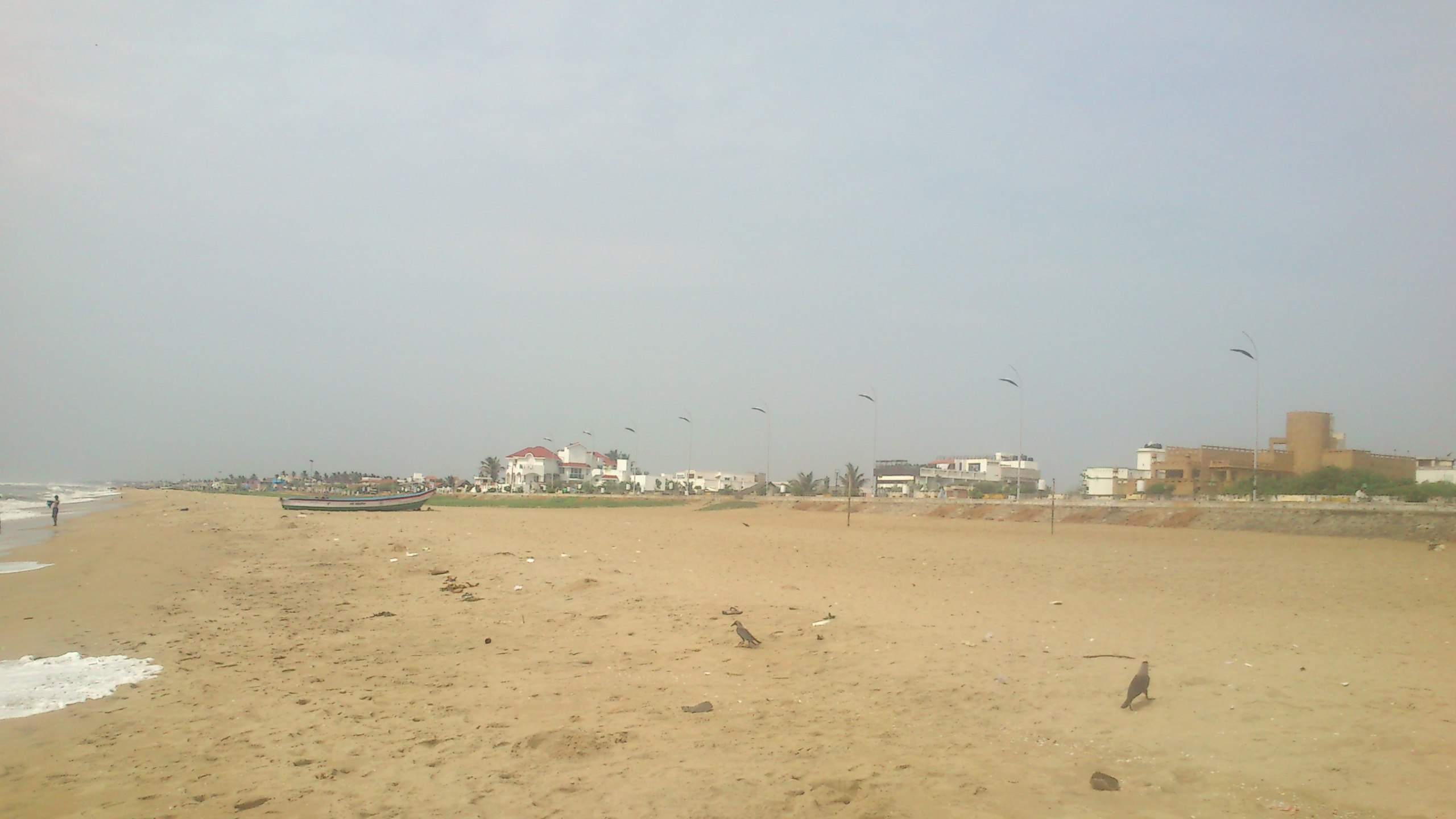
Thiruvanmiyur beach

Thiruvanmiyur is a largely residential neighborhood located in the south of Chennai, Tamil Nadu, India. Thiruvanmiyur witnessed a spike in its economy with the construction of Chennai's first dedicated technology office space, the Tidel Information Technology Park in neighboring Taramani. The subsequent rise of several information technology businesses, research centres and offices around Tidel park proved fortuitous for Thiruvanmiyur, as many of the workers at these offices often made Thiruvanmiyur their home. The Marundeeswarar Temple, dedicated to Shiva previously defined the area, leading it to be mentioned in Sangam Tamil epics. It is also commonly referred to as the MICO layout of Chennai city. Other Famous Temples are Ashtalakshmi Temple and Aarupadai Murugan Temple.

== Etymology ==
- This name is likely to be derived from Thiru-aamai-yur. A 895 AD relic of Nrupatunga Varman found in Ambur has an inscription about 'Aamiyur' situated in mel-adayaru of Paduvurkottam. The name literally means city of turtles. This town's beach is an important turtle habitat.
- Folklore around the place also say it might derives its name from Thiru-Valmiki-Ur, meaning location of the temple of Valmiki.

== Road and Transport ==
=== Buses ===
The area is easily accessible by Metropolitan Transport Corporation (MTC) buses and has a sprawling bus terminus. The MTC bus stops in the area are Jeyanthi Theatre, Thiruvanmiyur Bus Stand, Marundeeswarar temple, R.T.O office and Tidel park. SETC buses heading towards Pondicherry passes through the area and has a bus stop.

=== Railways ===
Thiruvanmiyur Railway station, opposite to Tidel Park, is on the Mass Rapid Transit System Railway line which connects Velachery and Beach via Chennai Central(Park Station). STPI, also known as Software Technology Parks of India, located near Tidel Park, is another hub for Information Technology companies.

Thiruvanmiyur also shares a metro station (in progress) near its MRTS station making it one of the major transportion hubs. The phase 2 of metro brings Thiruvanmiyur together with rest of the north-central chennai

=== Road ===
The East Coast Road starting in Thiruvanmiyur leads to Mahabalipuram and Pondicherry.

== Facilities and attractions ==
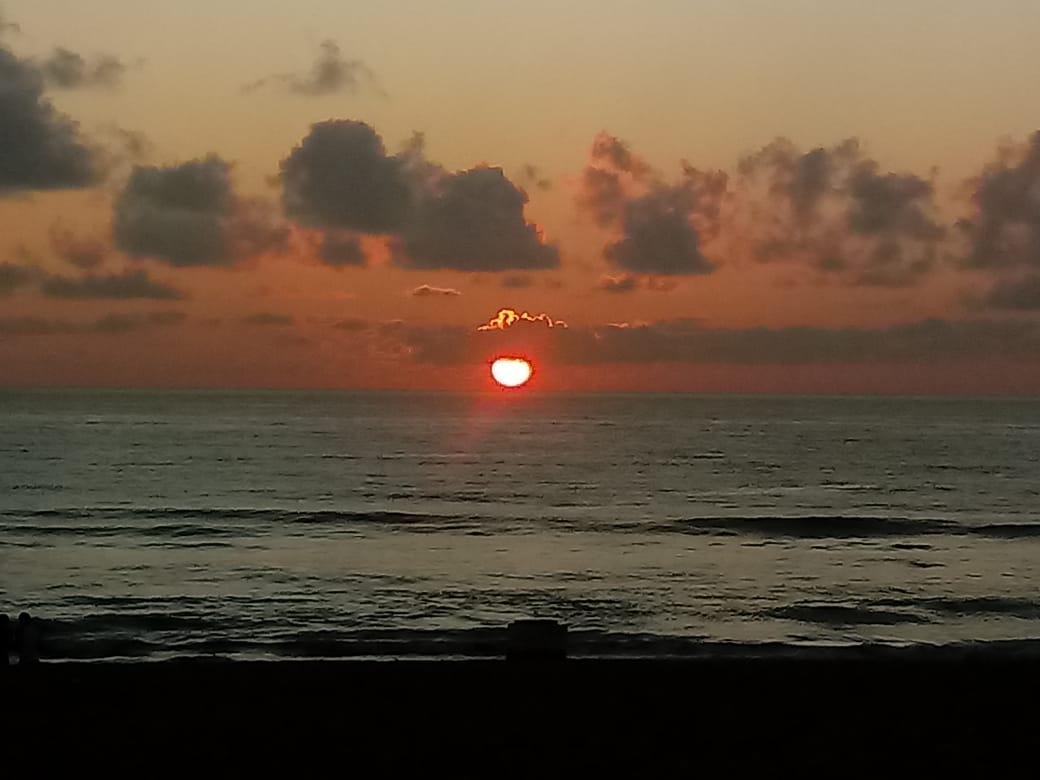
Sunrise at the Thiruvanmiyur beach

The main post office is located east of Lattice Bridge (LB) Road, around 100 meters before it meets Old Mahabalipuram Road. The two main theatres in the area are the Jayanthi (currently demolished to make way for a housing project) and the Theyagaraja / Sathyam S2. The South Chennai RTO is also located here on ECR. Kamarajar Hall is the biggest Auditorium present here.

Thiruvanmiyur Beach or RTO Beach is a popular attraction and the beach line is 1 km from East Coast Road. The Beach Walkers promenade is very popular with the local residents. The beach is a maintained clean with active support from the local community. The local community with the support of cotton house, has made an elderly walker's resting spot named after Dr. A.P.J.Abdul Kalam (the former president of India).

Schools: CBSE-Shraddha Children's Academy, Kottivakkam, K.S.N Senior Secondary School. State Board-Nellai Nadar Matriculation School, Sri Sankara Vidyashram matriculation higher secondary school.

== Places of worship ==
=== Temples ===
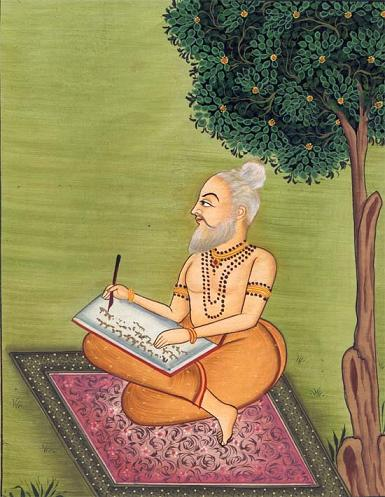
Sage Valmiki

- The Valmiki temple
- Marundeeswarar Temple, Thiruvanmiyur, Marundeeshwarar Temple
- The Pamban Swamigal Temple
- The Puthuranganni Amman Temple
- Thiruveethi Amman Temple
- Aarupadai veedu murugan temple
- Shirdi Sai Baba Temple, Kamaraj Nagar, Thiruvanmiyur
- Sarkarai Ammal Temple
- The 'Srinivasa Perumal' temple also known as Mangani Vinayakar Temple
- Vembuli Amman Temple,
- Kasiviswanathar Temple,
- Krishnamandiram Temple, Canal Road.
