= Olympia Tech Park =

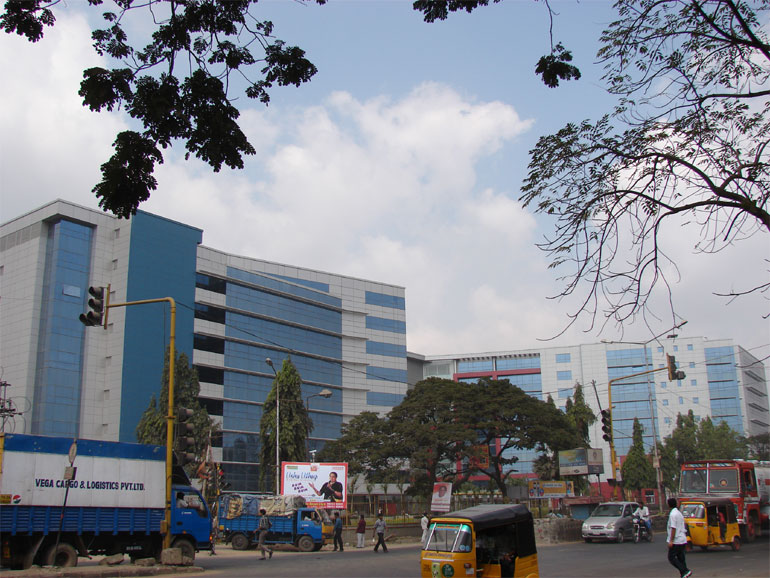
- Olympia Tech Park, as viewed from the Inner Ring Road

General information
- Type: Information Technology Park
- Location: Guindy, Chennai, Olympia Technology Park, Plot No.1, SIDCO Industrial Estate, Chennai, Tamil Nadu 600032

Technical details
- Floor count: 10

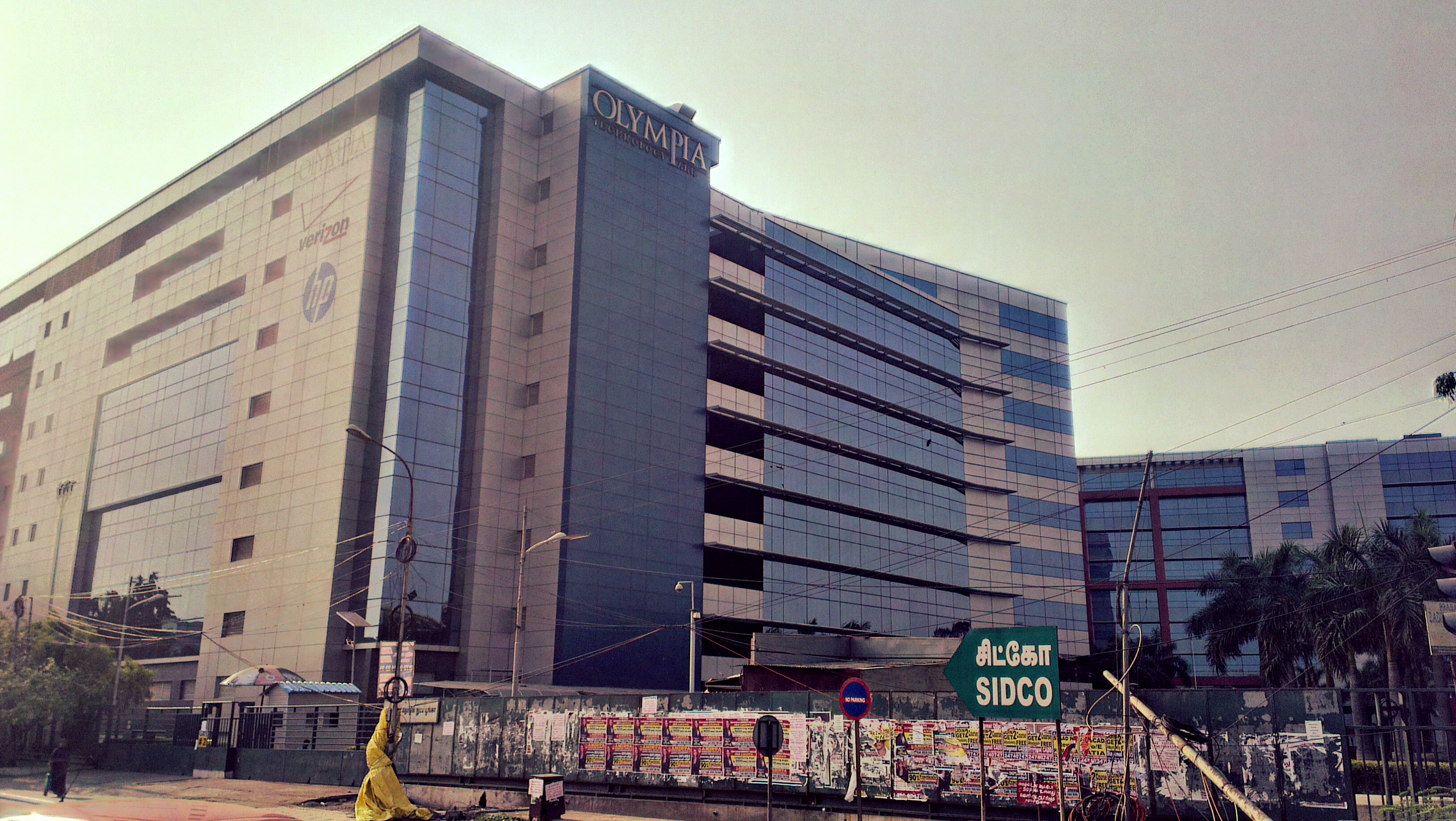
Olympia tech park, guindy, Chennai

Olympia Tech Park is the largest and one of the oldest Information Technology office locations in Chennai, India. Various companies have acquired office space in this business park, including Fortune 100 companies. It is located in the Inner Ring Road, Chennai just near the TANSIDCO Industry and the Kathipara Junction. With about 1.8 million sq. ft. area, it is also the first large green building in the city.

== The buildings ==
The technology park consists of three towers (phases), namely, Citius, Altius and Fortius. The park was completed in 2006, comprising a total area of 8 lakh square feet. Unlike the other major technology giants who have established themselves in the IT Corridor and Velachery, Olympia has gone all the way by creating a name in the Inner Ring Road where fewer IT Parks are present. It is located about 5 km from the Airport and 1.2 km from the Guindy Bus Station.

== Occupants ==
- AIGSS
- Alight Solutions
- Celestica
- CohnReznick Professional Services Private Limited
- Dedalus India, a division of Dedalus Global
- Dell
- DXC Technology
- FE fundinfo
- Guna Solar Private Limited
- Hewlett Packard Enterprise (HPE)
- Hewlett-Packard
- Halla Visteon Climate Control (HVCC)
- IBM
- Indium Software
- Innoppl Technologies
- Jency Technologies
- Kavin Raj Technologies
- Kumaran Systems Private Limited
- Logitech Engineering and Design, division of Logitech
- Mastech Infotrellis
- Merrill
- Motorq
- NatWest Group
- Naveen Raj Technologies
- The people's gym (for OTP Company employees)
- Rapid Info
- Regus
- Softura
- Thangareju Inc
- Unicol Technologies
- Verizon
- Visteon
- Wipro
