= International Tech Park, Chennai =

Technology park in south India

Coordinates: 12.985688°N 80.246061°E

International Tech Park Chennai, Taramani
- ITPC
- Interactive map of the International Tech Park Chennai, Taramani area

General information
- Type: Information Technology Park
- Location: Taramani, Chennai, India, Rajiv Gandhi Salai, Taramani, Chennai, Tamil Nadu 600 113, India
- Owner: CapitaLand

Technical details
- Floor area: 2,012,000 sq ft (186,900 m^{2})

Design and construction
- Developer: TIDCO and CapitaLand

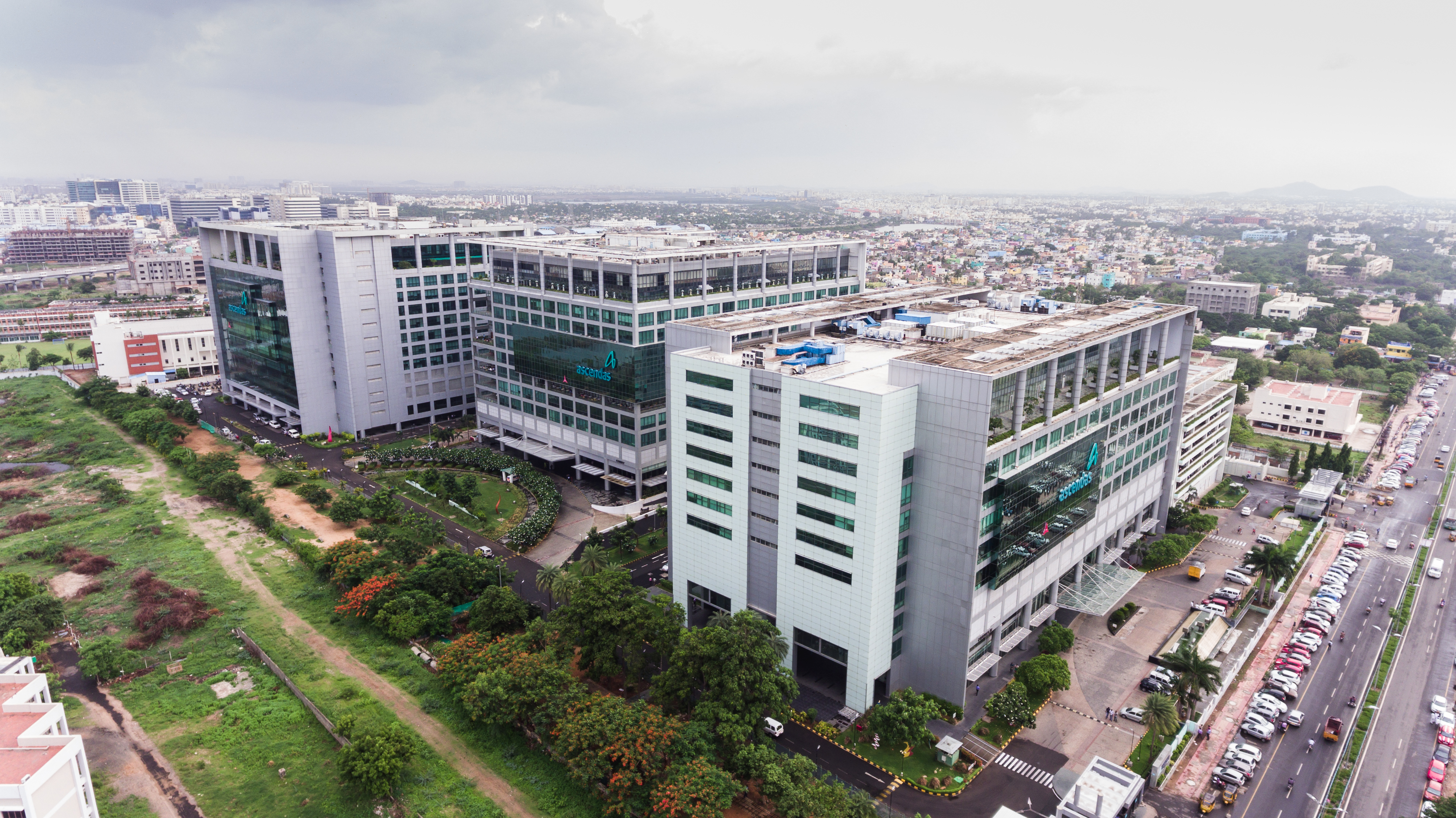
Located in Chennai's IT Corridor, International Tech Park Chennai – Taramani (ITPC Taramani) is a 15-acre IT Park with approx. 2 million sq.ft. of office space.

The International Tech Park Chennai, Taramani or ITPC (as it is popularly known) is an hi-tech park in Taramani, Chennai.

Located in Chennai's IT Corridor, it spans 15 acres, offering approximately 2 million sq ft of office space. Over 40 IT/ITES companies are operating out of the park. It has received various certifications including: PEER – Gold certification by US Green Building Council

== Phases ==
Pinnacle

This is the first phase of ITPC with a super build up area of about 540,000 sq ft (50,000 m^{2}).

Crest

This is the second phase of ITPC with a super build up area of about 730,000 sq ft (68,000 m^{2}).

Zenith

This is the third phase of ITPC with a super build up area of about 742,000 sq ft (68,900 m^{2}).

== LEED certification ==
In September 2011, ITPC's first phase building, the Pinnacle, earned the LEED Silver certification in the category "Existing Buildings: Operations & Maintenance (EB:O&M), version 2009 standard". This was the first multi-tenanted building in India to be awarded the LEED Silver certification.

In October 2012, ITPC was awarded the LEED Gold certification for Phase II, the Crest building, in the same category as the Phase I building. The certification was awarded in the category of Existing Buildings: Operations & Maintenance, version 2009 standard. It is the first multi-tenanted building in India to be certified LEED Gold under the new version. The building is the second of the three buildings at the tech park and offers 730,000 sq ft of office space. The building has made several modifications and retro-fits to conserve energy and water and reduce harmful greenhouse gas emissions.

In 2018 it received the PEEER Gold certification. the following year it received the Guinness record certification for successfully conducting ‘Preserve and Conserve Natural Resources program.’

== CyberVale ==
CyberVale -- located within Mahindra World City -- is a one hour drive from Chennai city. The park is located on GST road, which is in close proximity to manufacturing hubs such as Oragadam and Sriperumbadur.

== See also ==
- Economy of Chennai
- Rajiv Gandhi Salai
- International Tech Park, Bangalore
- The V, Hyderabad
- Cyber Pearl, Hyderabad
