= One Indiabulls Park =

Building in India

Coordinates: 13.0688266°N 80.2710856°E

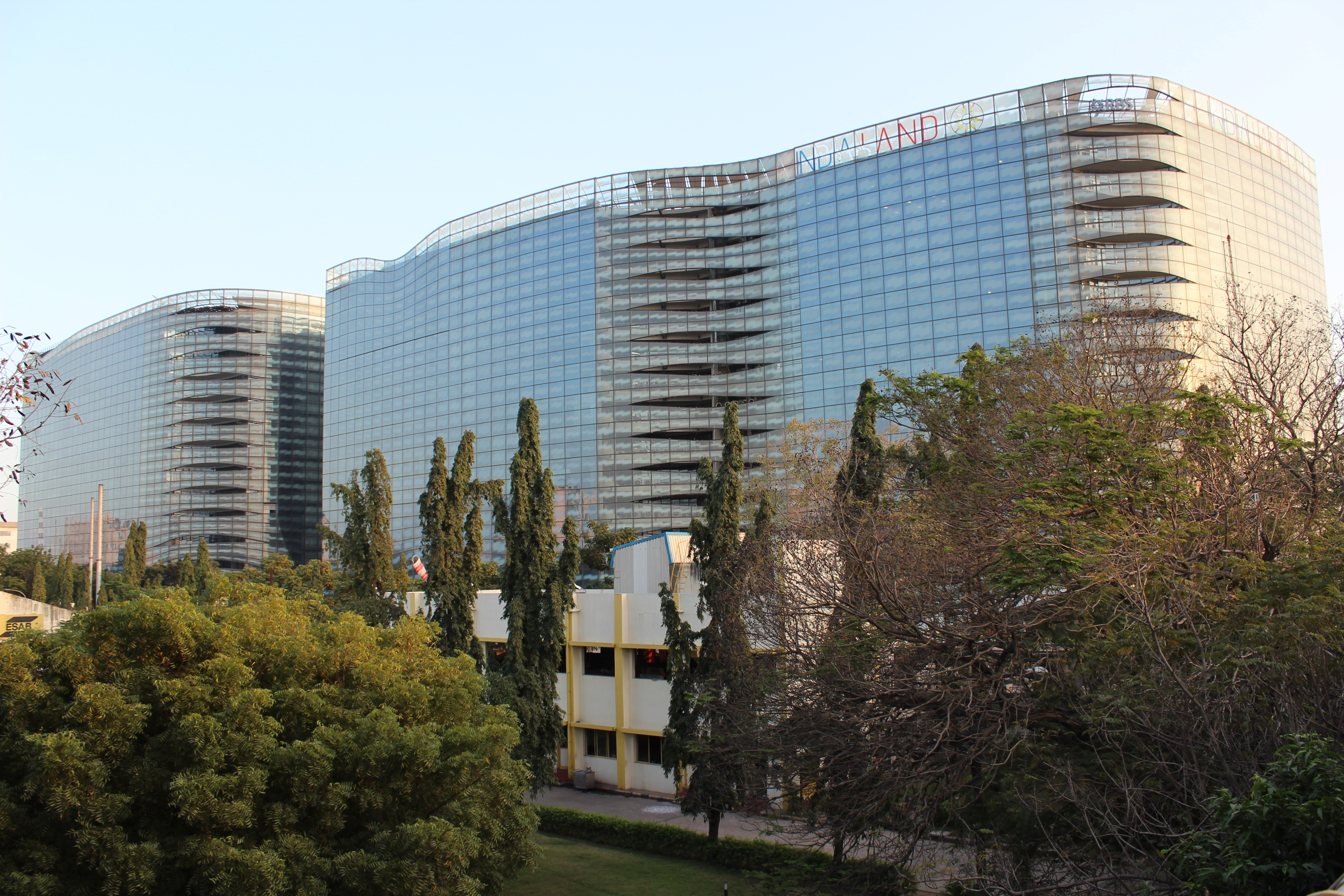
- One Indiabulls Park
- Interactive map of the One Indiabulls Park area

General information
- Type: Office
- Architectural style: Modernism
- Location: Ambattur, Chennai, India, Ambattur Industrial Estate, Chennai
- Construction started: 2006; 20 years ago
- Completed: 2010; 16 years ago
- Cost: ₹ 3,750 million

Technical details
- Floor count: 17
- Floor area: 2,400,000 sq ft (223,000 m^{2})

Design and construction
- Architects: Zaha Hadid (United Kingdom) and Cheralathan Associates, Chennai, India
- Developer: India Land and Properties (Americorp Group)
- Structural engineer: Buro Engineers (I) Private LTD., INDIA
- Main contractor: Shapoorji Pallonji

One Indiabulls Park is a 17-storied building at the Ambattur industrial estate in Chennai, India. It is the first skyscraper built in the neighborhood of Ambattur and is built on land measuring 10 acres. It has a total built-up space of 2.4 million sq ft and was built at a cost of ₹ 3,750 million.

== History ==
The building was constructed by India Land and Properties, a part of Americorp, and was designed specially to cater to IT and ITeS companies. In November 2014, Indiabulls Distribution Services Ltd, a subsidiary of Indiabulls Securities Ltd bought the complex for ₹ 600 crore and renamed the building as "One Indiabulls Park."

== Design and structure ==
The building has three towers each with 16 floors, including four levels in the basement for car parking, with a total constructed area of 2.4 million sq ft and leasable area of two million sq ft. The total office area of two million sq ft is divided between the three towers—Tower A (420,000 sq ft), Tower B (630,000 sq ft), and Tower C (950,000 sq ft). The total cost of the building was ₹4,500 million. The balance space in the building is used for parking, retail and landscaping infrastructure.

== Tenants ==
Tenants of the complex include Royal Bank of Scotland (RBS) (which occupies 420,000 sq ft, leasing out Tower A). Hinduja Global Solutions Limited, Kone, Access Healthcare Services, Britannia Industries, Ajuba, BankBazaar, MSC-Technology, Singapore's Bean Balls, Germany's Modisch, and Etisalat (50,000 sq ft) occupies tower B. The Back Office of Yes Bank occupies 4 floors of Tower C. KnackForge, a software development company, is located on the first floor of Tower C.

== In popular culture ==
One Indiabulls Park features in Tamil movies. It was one of the most common and most shown shooting spots for the Tamil film Kaththi, in which the place features as the office of Neil Nitin Mukesh's character.

== See also ==
- List of tallest buildings in Chennai
- Architecture of Chennai
