= List of tallest buildings in Chennai =

Skyscrapers in Chennai, India

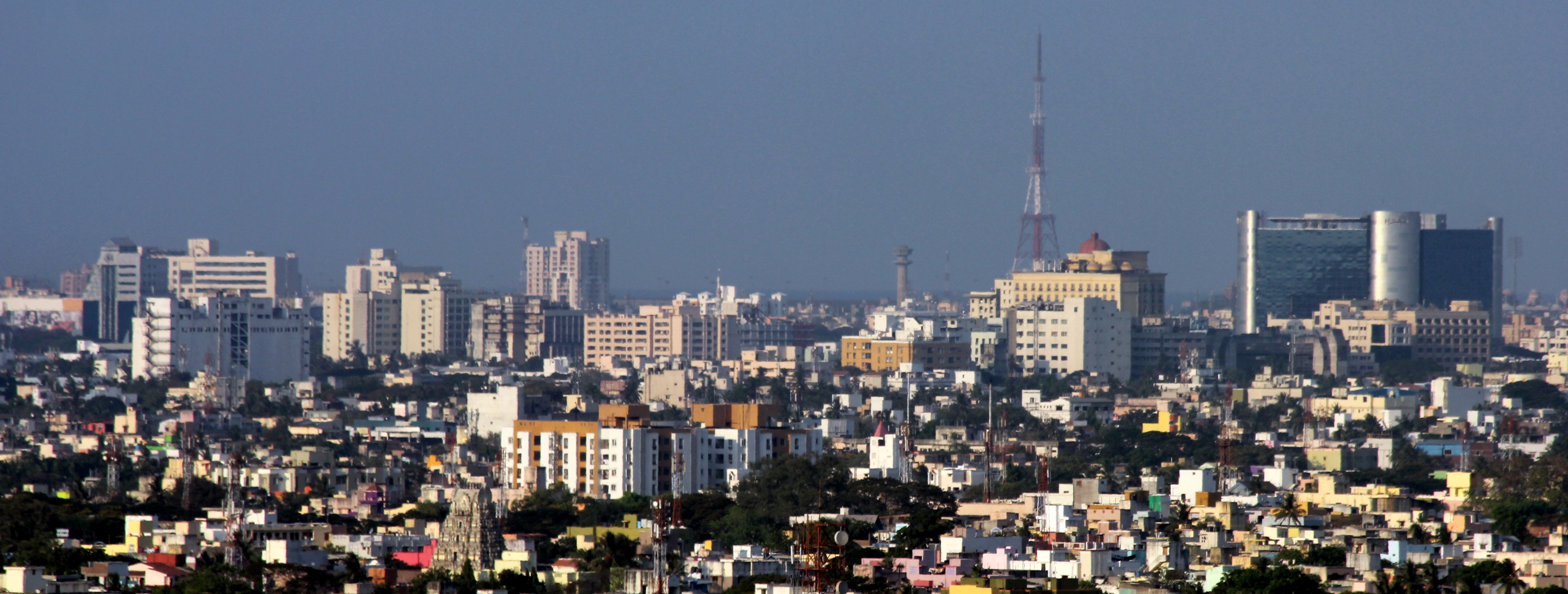
A portion of Chennai's skyline, showing taller buildings dotting Anna Salai.

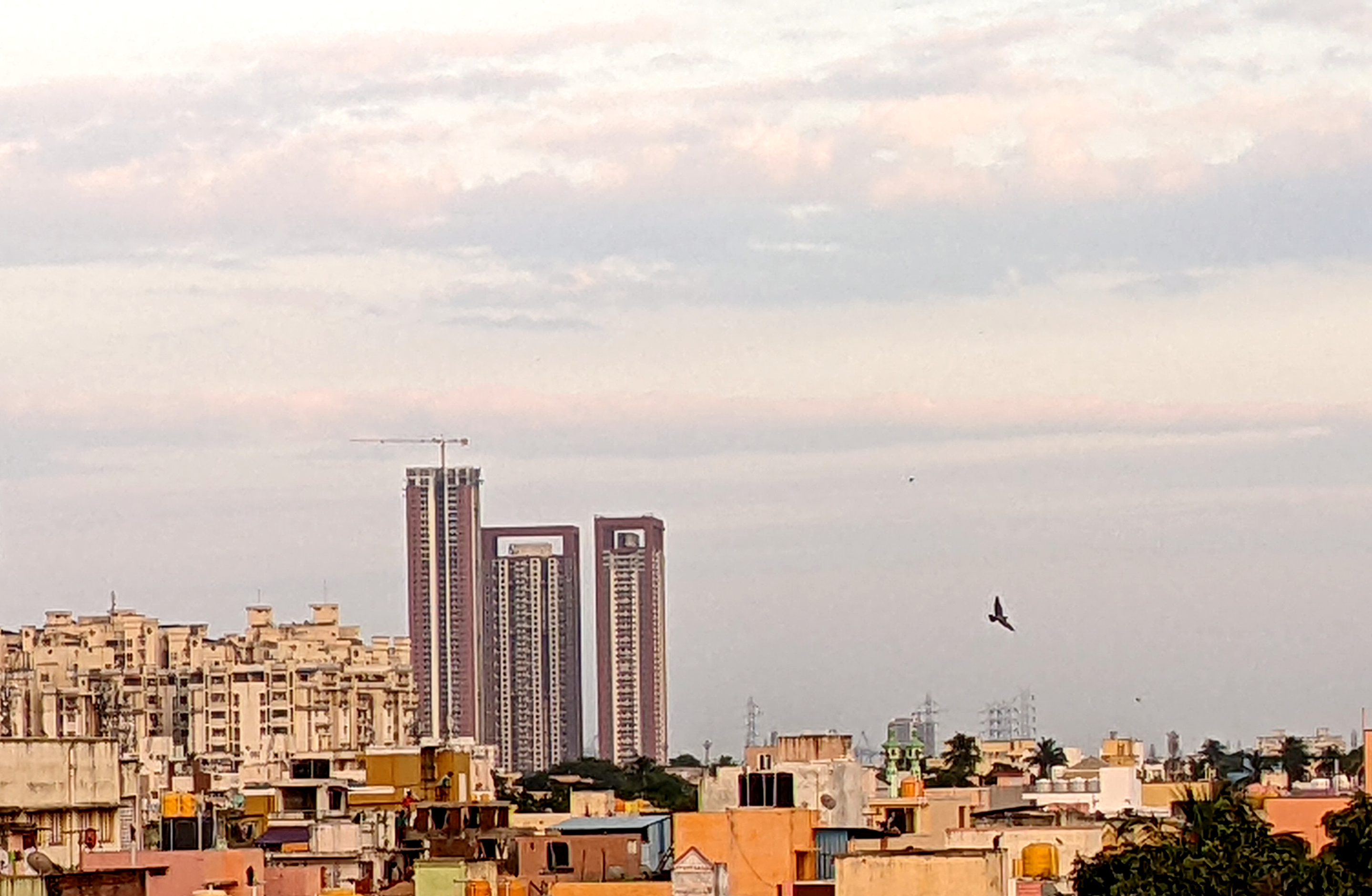
SPR Highliving District Towers, the tallest Building in Chennai as of January 2022

This list of tallest buildings in Chennai ranks high-rise and skyscraper buildings in Chennai, India, based on official height. LIC Building in the city was the tallest high-rise in India when it was inaugurated in 1959. Since the 2010s, Chennai is witnessing a huge high-rise boom with many high-rises being built in different parts of the city. SPR City Highliving District at Perumbur is the tallest building in the city with a height of 172 metres (561 ft) and 45 floors. The World Trade Center at Perungudi, the Houses of Hiranandani in Egattur, the TCS Signature Towers at Siruseri, the TVH Ouranya Bay at Padur, the LIC Building at Mount Road, Hyatt Regency Chennai at Teynampet and Arihant Majestic Towers at Koyambedu are some of the various prominent high-rises in the city.

Despite being a port city and a major commercial center, Chennai does not have any supertall skyscrapers like other major cities in India due to the presence of weather radar placed in the city by the Indian government.

== Background ==
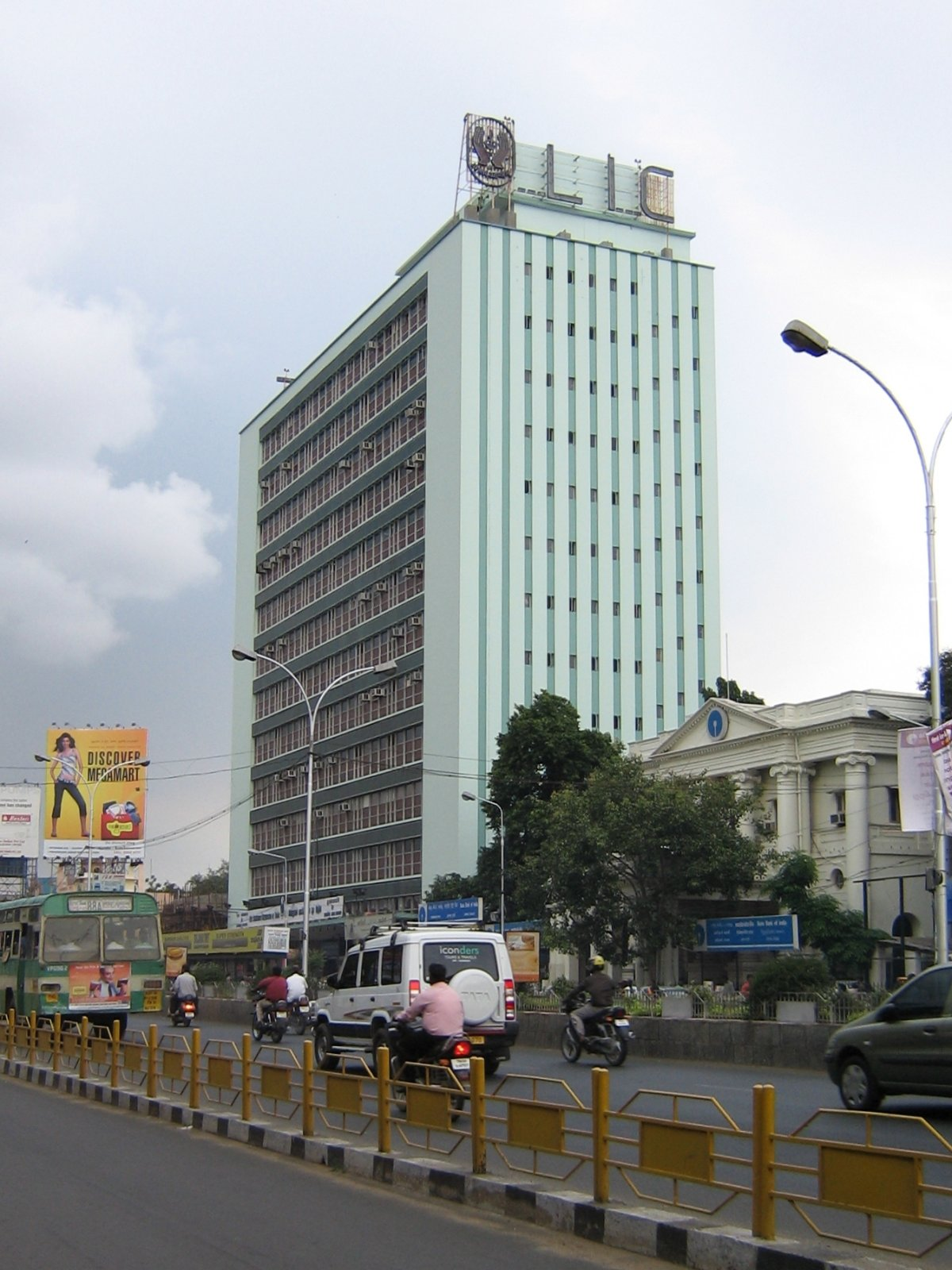
LIC Building, the first high-rise of Chennai and the tallest in India when opened in 1959

Unlike other metropolitan cities in the country, Chennai continues to experience a horizontal growth (that is, expanding continuously in its area) rather than a vertical growth by means of building more skyscrapers, owing to the presence of weather radar at the Chennai Port, which prohibits construction of taller buildings beyond its permissible limits. The maximum permissible building height in Chennai was limited to 40 m until 1998, when it was increased to 60 m. This restriction continued until the second master plan of the Chennai Metropolitan Development Authority was rolled out in 2008, after which the restriction was lifted, allowing buildings taller than 60 meters to be built. Until then, the LIC Building on Anna Salai, with 15 floors, dominated the city's skyline for almost four decades. Even the next tallest building, a 10-storied residential tower of the Tamil Nadu Housing Board (TNHB) at Nandanam, was not built until almost a decade later in 1968. However, after the big companies started building tall concrete structures in the city in the first and second decades of the twenty-first century, the skyline started changing, especially along the periphery, and more so in south Chennai along the Old Mahabalipuram Road, Egattur, Perumbakkam, and the East Coast Road. According to realty portal Commonfloor.com, as of 2014, there were 96 high-rises (buildings with 10 or more storeys) and 148 buildings under construction or planned.

As of 2020, SPR city Highliving Tower H remains the tallest building in Chennai with a maximum height of 172.5 metres (566 ft) and 45 floors. Many more high-rises are already under construction in the city and dozens are proposed. However, the height of the buildings in the central business district has seldom gone beyond 20 floors. Almost 500 high-rises have already been constructed in the city, of which the majority are residential.

== Tallest buildings ==
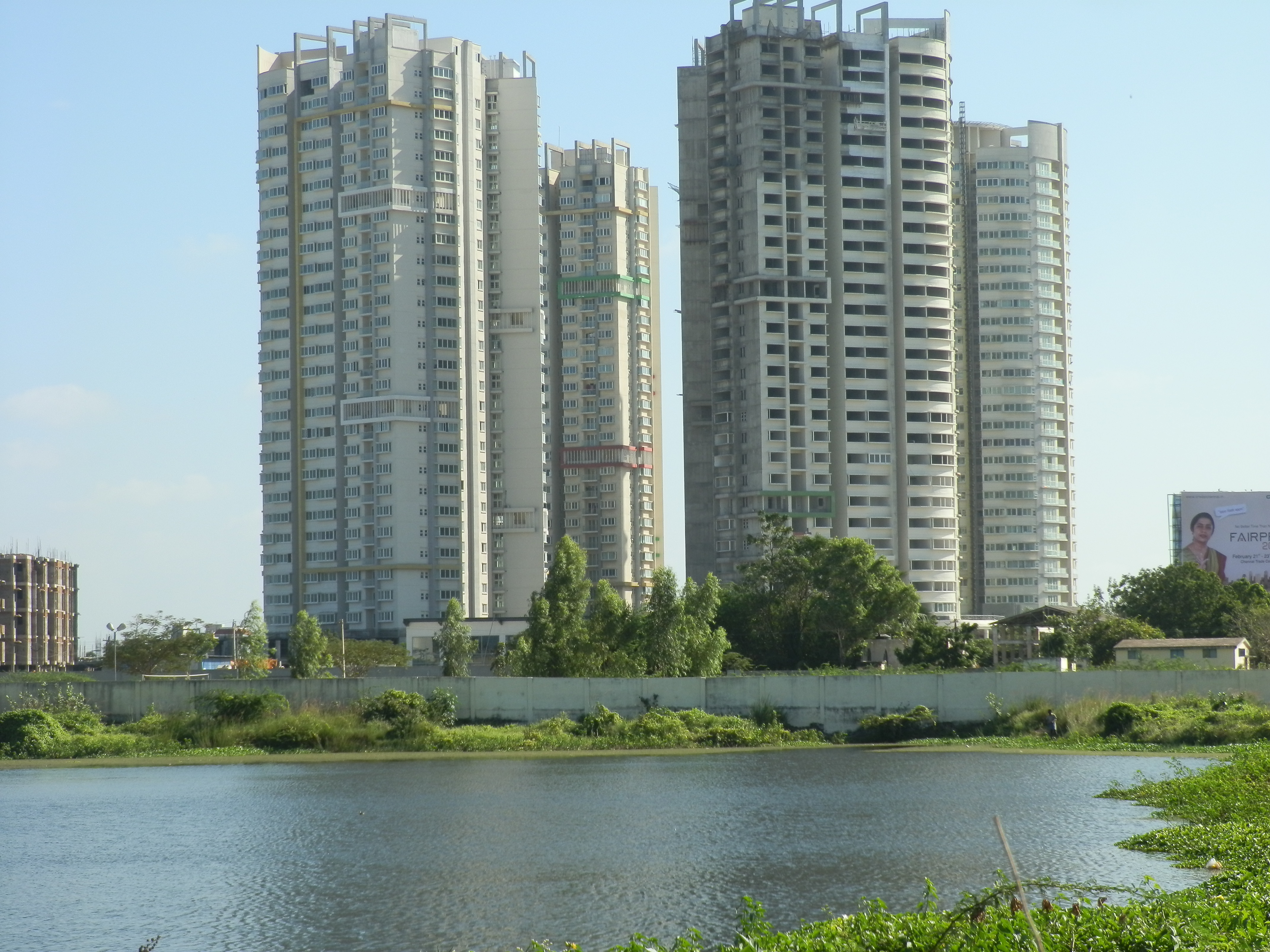
The 30-storied TVH Ouranya Bay

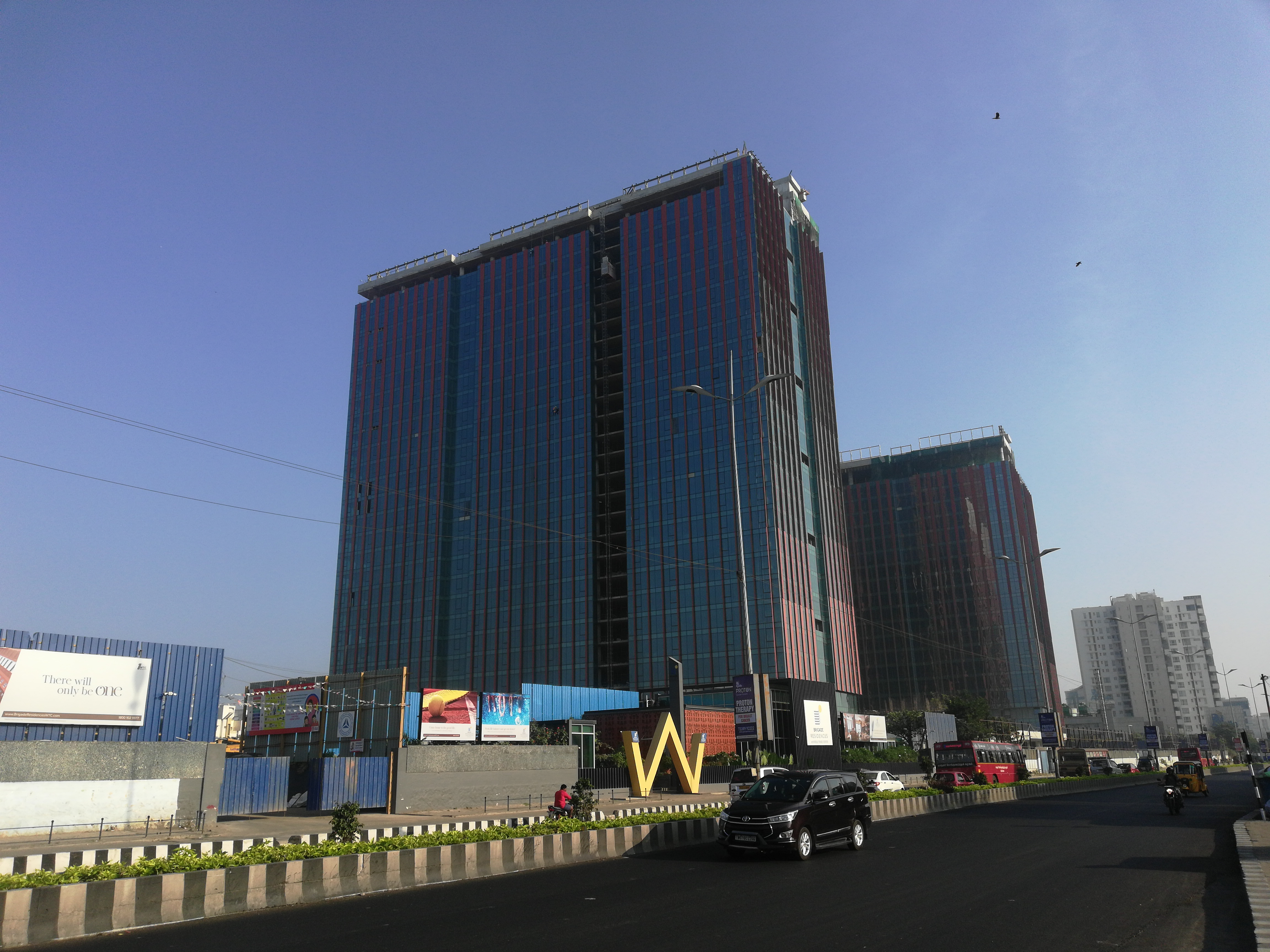
World Trade Center, Chennai

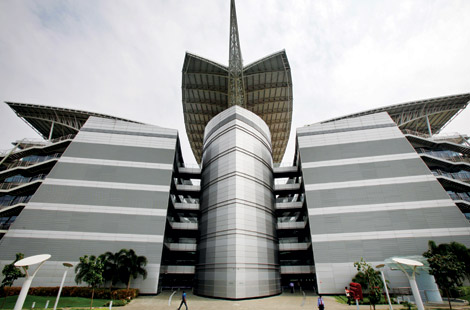
TCS Signature Tower at Siruseri, Chennai

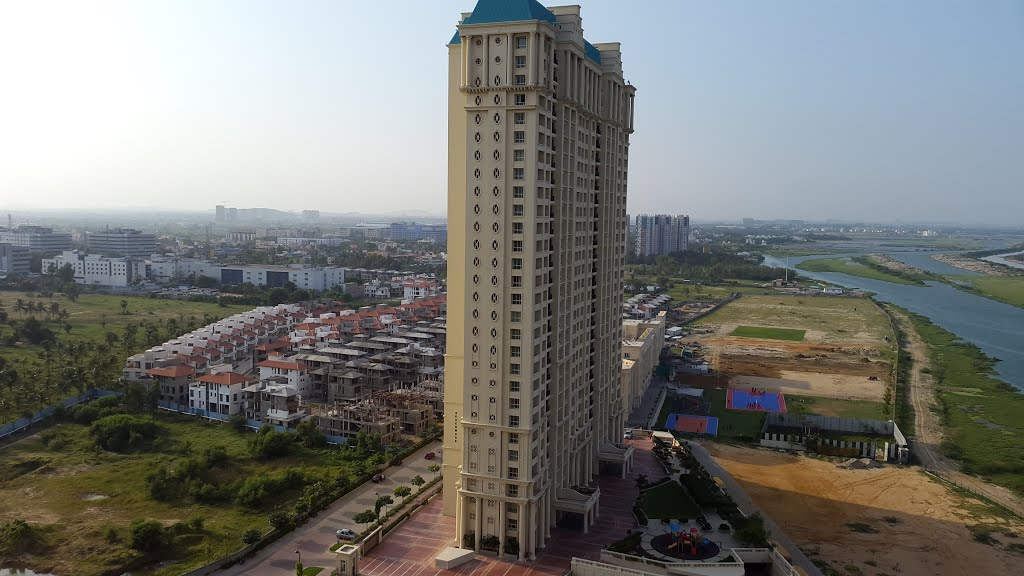
A 29-storied skyscraper in southern Chennai

This lists ranks buildings in Chennai according to height. All the buildings listed below rise at least up to a height of 100 metres (328 ft).

Name	Image	Locale	Height	Floors	Building type	Year
Highliving District Tower-H—SPR City	SPR City Highliving Chennai	Perambur	172 metres (564 ft)	47	Residential	2020
Anchorage, House of Hiranandani		Egattur	161 metres (528 ft)	45	Residential	2019
Highliving District Tower-A-SPR City		Perambur	144 metres (472 ft)	38	Residential	2020
Highliving District Tower-B-SPR City		Perambur	144 metres (472 ft)	38	Residential	2020
Appasamy Altezza Tower 1		Perungudi	138 metres (453 ft)	40	Residential	2024
Bayview House of Hiranandani		Egattur	134 metres (440 ft)	40	Residential	2015
Amalfi House of Hiranandani		Egattur	130 metres (427 ft)	36	Residential	2015
Tiana House of Hiranandani		Egattur	130 metres (427 ft)	34	Residential	2019
TCS Signature Tower		Siruseri	130 metres (427 ft)	28	Office	2015
Edina House of Hiranandani		Egattur	115 metres (377 ft)	31	Residential	2015
Dinesh Vihar AWHO, OMR Tower 1		Semmanchery	112 metres (367 ft)	30	Residential	2018
Dinesh Vihar AWHO, OMR Tower 2		Semmanchery	112 metres (367 ft)	30	Residential	2018
Dinesh Vihar AWHO, OMR Tower 3		Semmanchery	112 metres (367 ft)	30	Residential	2018
Dinesh Vihar AWHO, OMR Tower 4		Semmanchery	112 metres (367 ft)	30	Residential	2018
Dinesh Vihar AWHO, OMR Tower 5		Semmanchery	112 metres (367 ft)	30	Residential	2018
Dinesh Vihar AWHO, OMR Tower 6		Semmanchery	112 metres (367 ft)	30	Residential	2018
TVH Ouranya Bay 1		Padur	111 metres (364 ft)	30	Residential	2013
TVH Ouranya Bay 2		Padur	111 metres (364 ft)	30	Residential	2013
TVH Ouranya Bay 3		Padur	111 metres (364 ft)	30	Residential	2013
TVH Ouranya Bay 4		Padur	111 metres (364 ft)	30	Residential	2013
TVH Ouranya Bay 5		Padur	111 metres (364 ft)	30	Residential	2013
TVH Ouranya Bay 6		Padur	111 metres (364 ft)	30	Residential	2013
Baashyaam Pinnacle Crest Tower 1		Sholinganallur	111 metres (364 ft)	30	Residential	2016
Birchwood by House of Hiranandani		Egattur	110 metres (361 ft)	29	Residential	2011
Greenwood by House of Hiranandani		Egattur	110 metres (361 ft)	29	Residential	2011
Seawood by House of Hiranandani		Egattur	110 metres (361 ft)	29	Residential	2011
Brentwood by House of Hiranandani		Egattur	110 metres (361 ft)	29	Residential	2011
Oceanic by House of Hiranandani		Egattur	110 metres (361 ft)	29	Residential	2011
Pinewood by House of Hiranandani		Egattur	110 metres (361 ft)	29	Residential	2013
Voora Oceans 27 (Tower 1)		Tondiarpet	108 metres (354 ft)	27	Residential	2024
Voora Oceans 27 (Tower 2)		Tondiarpet	108 metres (354 ft)	27	Residential	2024
Baashyaam Crown Residencies Signature Tower		Koyambedu	108 metres (354 ft)	28	Residential	2024
Crown Residencies Tower 1		Koyambedu	108 metres (354 ft)	29	Residential	2024
Crown Residencies Tower 2		Koyambedu	108 metres (354 ft)	27	Residential	2024
Crown Residencies Tower 3		Koyambedu	108 metres (354 ft)	29	Residential	2024
Crown Residencies Tower 4		Koyambedu	108 metres (354 ft)	29	Residential	2024
Crown Residencies Tower 5		Koyambedu	108 metres (354 ft)	30	Residential	2024
Crown Residencies Tower 6		Koyambedu	108 metres (354 ft)	30	Residential	2024
Crown Residencies Tower 7		Koyambedu	108 metres (354 ft)	28	Residential	2024
Crown Residencies Tower 8		Koyambedu	108 metres (354 ft)	30	Residential	2024
Crown Residencies Tower 9		Koyambedu	108 metres (354 ft)	30	Residential	2024
Crown Residencies Tower 10		Koyambedu	108 metres (354 ft)	28	Residential	2024
Crown Residencies Tower 11		Koyambedu	108 metres (354 ft)	29	Residential	2024
Crown Residencies Tower 12		Koyambedu	108 metres (354 ft)	29	Residential	2024
Windsor Hiranandani Palace Gardens		Oragadam	106 metres (348 ft)	28	Residential	2017
Wilton Hiranandani Palace Gardens		Oragadam	106 metres (348 ft)	28	Residential	2017
Belvoir Hiranandani Palace Gardens		Oragadam	106 metres (348 ft)	28	Residential	2017
Belchamp Hiranandani Palace Gardens		Oragadam	106 metres (348 ft)	28	Residential	2017
Emami Tejomaya Tower 1		Egattur	105 metres (344 ft)	27	Residential	2017
Emami Tejomaya Tower 2		Egattur	105 metres (344 ft)	27	Residential	2017
Emami Tejomaya Tower 3		Egattur	105 metres (344 ft)	27	Residential	2017
World Trade Center Tower 1		Perungudi	122 metres (400 ft)	28	Commercial	2020
Brigade Residences Tower 1 World Trade Center		Perungudi	102 metres (335 ft)	26	Residential	2024
Brigade Residences Tower 2 World Trade Center		Perungudi	102 metres (335 ft)	26	Residential	2025
Sinovia House of Hiranandani		Egattur	100 metres (328 ft)	26	Residential	2015
Baashyaam Pinnacle Crest Tower 2		Sholinganallur	100 metres (328 ft)	27	Residential	2016
TNHB Mall		Ashok Nagar	84.5 metres (277 ft)	23	Residential + small retail	Topped out - May 2025
Navins Starwood Towers Phase-2 and 3(Cedar and Maple)		Medavakkam	73.45	22	Residential	

== Tallest under construction or proposed ==
=== Under construction ===
This lists buildings that are under construction in the city and are planned to rise at least up to a height of 70 metres (230 ft). Buildings that are only approved or proposed are not included in this table.

Name	Locale	Height	Floors	Building type	Year
SPR BINNY SKY - THE CAPITAL DISTRICT Residential Tower	Perambur	161 metres (528 ft)	45	Residential	
Highliving District Tower-C-SPR City Phase 2	Perambur	161 metres (528 ft)	45	Residential	structure around 42nd floor
Casagrand Mercury—Galaxy 2, Tower 2	Perambur	162 Meters	43	Residential	
Brigade Altius (pfizer) 3 Towers B2+S+43	Sholinganallur	155 meters	44	Residential	u/c
Brigade Icon Residential Tower	Anna Salai/Whites Road	138.5 Meters	38	Residential	U/C
Royal Land Developers Altima -3 blocks	Kelambakkam/Padur	155 AAI NOC 122 per plan	36	Residential	U/C
Central Square Building	Park Town	135 metres (443 ft)	27	Commercial	U/C
Voora ONE SEA	ECR(Kanathur)	133.10	42X2 13X1 (1X40+ future)	Residential	U/C
Casagrand Mercury—Galaxy 1, Tower 1	Perambur		36	Residential	
Casagrand Mercury—Galaxy 1, Tower 2	Perambur		36	Residential	
Casagrand Mercury—Galaxy 2, Tower 1	Perambur		36	Residential	
Casagrand Mercury—Galaxy 3, Tower 1	Perambur		36	Residential	
Casagrand Suncity Ph1 - 4 Towers	Kelambakkam	135	37	Residential	
Baashyam Enchante	Perungudi	130 AAI NOC 113.40 per Plan	33	Residential	U/C
DLF Downtown Tower 4,5	Tharamani	128 (EC)	29	Commercial	U/C
Royal Land Developers Altima -3 blocks	Kelambakkam/Padur	122 - block1 (155 NOC)	36 X1 (UC) 36X2 future	Residential	U/C
Altis OceanCliffs	Kanathur, ECR	124.95	1X35 2X34	Residential	U/C
Akshaya Abov	Padur	132 metres (433 ft) 150 (nov 2025 AAI NOC)	38	Residential	Halted at 26 Floors
Sattva IT Towers X 3 towers	Perungudi	98.4	22,21&21	Commercial	U/C
Bollineni Zion Block A	Semmanchery	108 metres (354 ft)	28	Residential	
Bollineni Zion Block B	Semmanchery	108 metres (354 ft)	28	Residential	
Bollineni Zion Block C	Semmanchery	108 metres (354 ft)	28	Residential	
Bollineni Zion Block D	Semmanchery	108 metres (354 ft)	28	Residential	
Bollineni Zion Block E	Semmanchery	108 metres (354 ft)	28	Residential	
Bollineni Zion Block F	Semmanchery	108 metres (354 ft)	28	Residential	
Bollineni Zion Block G	Semmanchery	108 metres (354 ft)	28	Residential	
Bollineni Zion Block H	Semmanchery	108 metres (354 ft)	28	Residential	
Bollineni Zion Block J	Semmanchery	108 metres (354 ft)	28	Residential	
Bollineni Zion Block K	Semmanchery	108 metres (354 ft)	28	Residential	
Bollineni Zion Block L	Semmanchery	108 metres (354 ft)	28	Residential	
Bollineni Zion Block M	Semmanchery	108 metres (354 ft)	28	Residential	
Bollineni Zion Block N	Semmanchery	108 metres (354 ft)	28	Residential	
Casagrand Aquagrove	Surapet	106 (CMDA) 110 AAI NOC	1X29 2X27	Residential	U/C
Ampa HILIFE Ampa TAJ + TAJ residences	Amijikarai	101 meters (EC certificate)	24 23	Hotel Offices+Res	~15 Flrs
Asta properties @ Hotel President site	RK Salai	91.95 (CMDA PP-HRB-S-0275-2025)	23	Residential	Approved by CMDA
ASV Alwarpet	Alwarpet	80	22	Residential	CMDA approved
ASTA AVM ph-2	Saligramam	80	23	Residential	
Urbanrise clover land(whispers of sky)	Sholinganallur	90	2 X S+24	Residential	Approved
Brigade Perumbakkam 1X25, 1X19, 1X14	Perumbakkam	90	25	Residential	U/C
Brigade Icon Commercial+Retail Tower	Anna Salai	88 Meters	18	Commercial	U/C
Jains Westminster rebuild	Vadpalani	81	22	Residential	
Amara - Koyambedu	PH road, Koyambedu	88.05	25	Residential	CMDA approved
Prestige Palm courts	Madhavaram, Chennai	78(CMDA plan)	5XG+22	Residential	RERA approved
Radiance Eternity	Thoraipakkam, OMR	78.5	23	Residential	Approved -U/C
casagrand platinum Joy	Kundrathur	76	22	Commercial	U/C
Casagrand Primrose	Mannivakkam, near Perungulathur		22	Residential	U/C
ETA Techno Park 2 (ETA Techno Park)	Navalur	82 metres (269 ft)	22	Commercial	Temporarily stopped
M One by Lokaa	Madhavaram	79.5 metres (261 ft)	23	Residential	Structure Completed
Casagrand Massimo	Kundrathur	72.45	22	Residential	
casagrand skytech	perungudi	72.5	14	IT	cmda approved
La Verde Mare Antareeksh 9 Towers (Jains)	Perungudi	74 metres (243 ft)	20	Residential	Few constructed Rest U/C

=== Proposed ===
This lists buildings that are only proposed or approved in the city and are planned to rise at least up to a height of 60 metres (197 ft).

Name	Locale	Height	Floors	Building type	Year
Highliving District Tower-D-SPR City Phase 2	Perambur	243 metres (797 ft)	70	Residential	Approved
Emami Tejomaya II	Egattur	200		Residential	AAI NOC approved
Emami Mirai	Siruseri	210		Residential	AAI NOC
Sobha project next to smidth, OMR	Egattur	160	47,46,2X42	mall+Residential	
Highliving District Tower-E-SPR City Phase 2	Perambur	161 metres (528 ft)	45	Residential	Approved
Highliving District Tower-F-SPR City Phase 2	Perambur	161 metres (528 ft)	45	Residential	Approved
Highliving District Tower-G-SPR City Phase 2	Perambur	161 metres (528 ft)	45	Residential	Approved
Brigade Toledo (5 towers)	Perambur	160	50 44 42 41 39	Residential	AAI NOC approved, EC sought
Casagrand project	Santhome (behind DGP ofc)	150			AAI NOC
Urbanise Karappakkam - 6 Towers	Karappakkam	142.21	1 X S+39 4 X S+37 1 X S+34+3 club floors	Residential	EC approved
Baashyam Haddows Road	Nungambakkam	149(per EC)	36 x 3		AAI NOC approved
Ceebros OMR	Thoraipakkam, next to Park Plaza hotel)	130	5 X G+39 (RES) 1XG+15 (COMM)	Commercial + Residential	EC approval IP
Brigade @YMCA Trillium Office Tower + JW marriot	Perungudi	130 AAI NOC	G+27	Commercial + Hotel	EC Filed
Prestige FORUM one + Moxy @ YMCA	OMR, Perungudi	125 AAI NOC	G+17	Mall+Offices+Hotel	EC granted, AAI NOC approved
Bagmanae @ Cognizant site	Karappakkam		27	commercial	Demolition completed
Incor PBEL city Phase 3	Kelambakkam	120	4X31 8X14	Residential	AAI NOC approved
Baashyam Crowne Plaza	Alwarpet	111	G+26	Residential	ECobtained
Ritz Carlton	MRC Nagar	106	TBD	Hotel+Commercial	AAI NOC received. CRZ approved
Arihant Commercial tower	saidapet	100 AAI NOC	-	Commercial	AAI NOC received
MKR estates (MGM group) Office Tower+Hilton	Egmore	96(AAI NOC MKR)	24(Office) 21(Hotel)	Commercial	EC sought for revised plan
Colt Datacenter (next to Kosmo one)	Ambattur	92.5	11 levels 9 levels	Data Center	EC sought
Casagrand (Behind Int'l school)	perumbakkam	90	2X27	residential	EC granted
Southgate project	vandalur-Oragadam		25	residential	EC sought
Jains Ananta - 3 Towers	Korattur		24,20&12	Residential	EC applied
ashiana housing	Paranur		8X23	Residential	EC applied
Casagrand PH road	Kattupakkam (13°03'17.2"N 80°07'13.0"E)	70	21	Residential	cmda approved
Coromandel Intl(Murugappa Group)	Kotturpuram	75	-	Commercial	AAI NOC received. EC sought
RR skyline revival (Chettinad group project)	Ambattur	75		Commercial	AAI noc Jan 2026
Casagrand highcity	Thirumudivakkam	72.5	23	Residential	CMDA approved
Navin Hill view ph2	Thirumudivakkam	81 AAI	22	Residential	EC sought
Jains Aadhya	Semmencheri		22	Residential	approvals sought
Shriram Koyambedu	Koyambedu	66+stack	17	Residential	CMDA approved
Casagrand IT Park	Sholinganallur	~55	11	Commercial	EC approved
House of Hiranandani Richmond	Egattur	165	TBD	Residential	AAI NOC approved
House of Hiranandani Icon	Egattur	165	TBD	Residential	AAI NOC approved
Prestige Arihant JV	Padi	120	12X35	Residential	AAI NOC, EC sought
Pragyna Eden park phaseIII	Siruseri		8X33	Residential	EC sought
House of Hiranandani Nautica	Egattur	161	TBD	Residential	AAI NOC approved
Casagrand Suncity Ph-2&3 Towers 5–8	Kelambakkam	163	1XG+36 3XG+39	Residential	EC amendment
Appollo Medical city	Karapakkam	150 AAI		Hospital	AAI NOC obtained Ground prep IP
Brigade, Pee&Dee lands holdings. 3 towers	Thiruvanmiyur Jn	145		TBD	AAI NOC obtained
Prestige Medavakkam	Medavakkam Ramco site	144			AAI NOC
Brigade @ Dairy Road	Korattur	107		TBD	AAI NOC obtained
Casagrand Udayamm hotel+Res	KK Nagar/Ashok Nagar	70	17	170key hotel+Res	EC filed
Rattha residential	Aminjikarai	TBD	23	residential	EC sought
VRX 360	Thirumazhisai	60 metres (197 ft)	19	Residential	Approved
Arihant MGR Salai	Perungudi	128	35-40	Residential	AAI NOC, EC sought
Metrozone Tower (Metrozone)	Anna Nagar	111 metres (364 ft)	30	Residential	Approved
Urbania by House of Hiranandani	Egattur	112 metres (367 ft)	30	Residential	Approved
Sea Gull House of Hiranandani	Egattur	108 metres (354 ft)	29	Residential	Approved
Elina by House of Hiranandani	Egattur	108 metres (354 ft)	29	Residential	Approved
Marina by House of Hiranandani	Egattur	108 metres (354 ft)	29	Residential	Approved
Irina by House of Hiranandani	Egattur	108 metres (354 ft)	29	Residential	Approved
Casagrand Annanagar W (school Rd X E Main Rd)	Anna Nagar (W)	80 metres (262 ft)	TBD	Residential	AAI NOC
Urbanrise whispers of sky	nookampalayam		2X25	Residential	EC sought
casagrand residential 5X23	pazhanthandalam ORR	74.05	4X23	Residential	EC filed
Not tracking all other towers being proposed/planned under 75 meters Tall.

== Timeline of tallest buildings ==
Name	Image	Neighbourhood	Height	Floors	Years as tallest
LIC Building		Anna Salai	54 metres (177 ft)	15	1959–1998
Arihant Majestic Towers		Koyambedu	63.24 metres (207 ft)	17	1998–1999
Hyatt Regency Chennai		Anna Salai, Teynampet	71 metres (233 ft)	18	1999–2011
Birchwood		Egattur	104 metres (341 ft)	28	2011–2013
TVH Ouranya Bay		Old Mahabalipuram Road, Padur	108 metres (354 ft)	30	2013–2015
Bayview		Old Mahabalipuram Road, Egattur	140 metres (459 ft)	40	2015–2019
Anchorage		Old Mahabalipuram Road, Egattur	161 metres (528 ft)	45	2019–2020
Highliving District Tower-H—SPR City		Perambur	172 metres (564 ft)	45	2020–Present

== See also ==
- Architecture of Chennai
- List of tallest buildings in India
- List of tallest buildings in Asia
- List of tallest buildings
- List of tallest buildings in different cities in India
