= TVH Ouranya Bay Towers =

- Ouranya Bay
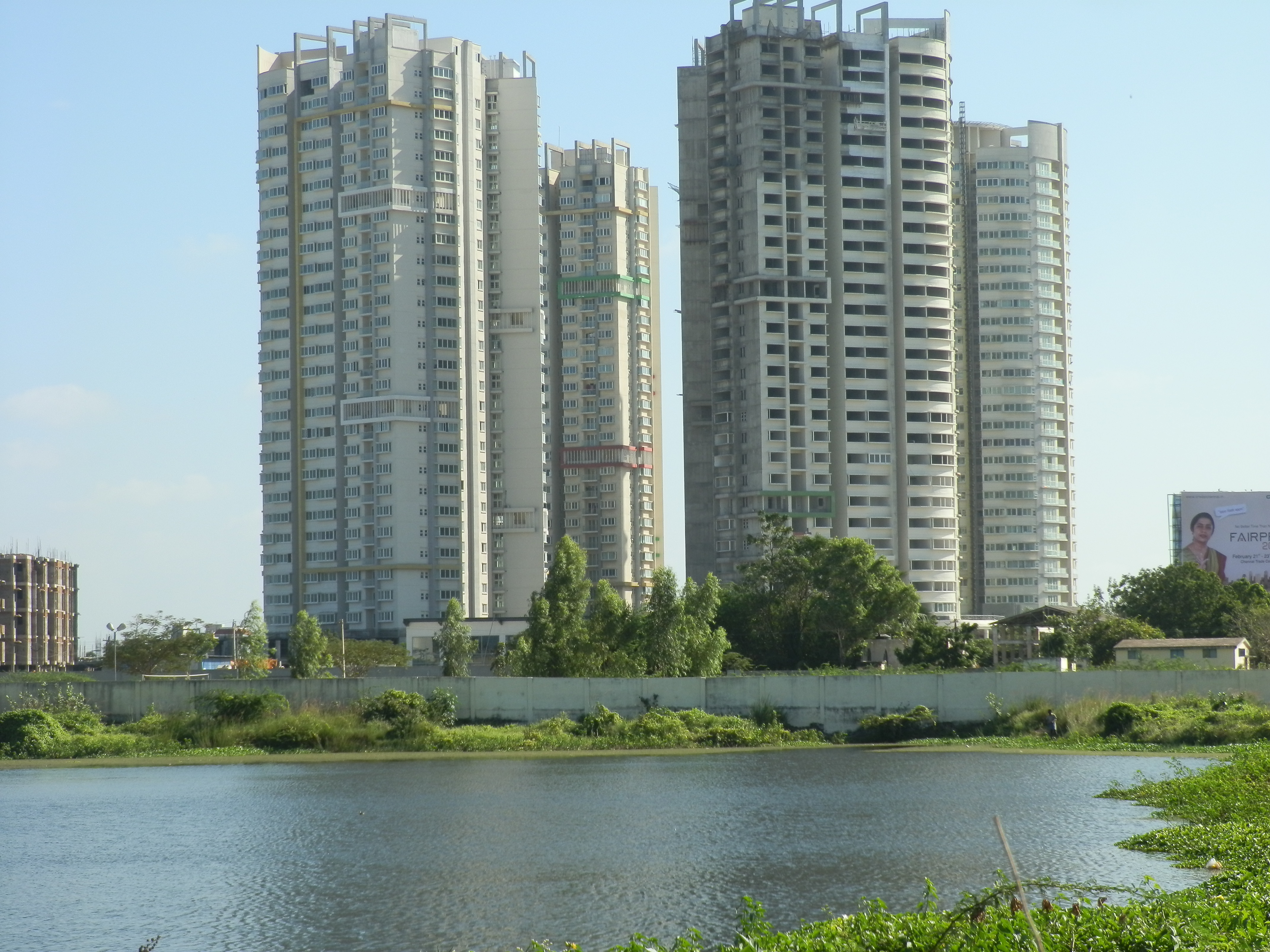
- Interactive map of the TVH Ouranya Bay Towers area

General information
- Type: Residential
- Architectural style: Modernism
- Location: Old Mahabalipuram Road, Padur, Chennai, India, Old Mahabalipuram Road, Padur, Chennai, Tamil Nadu, India
- Coordinates: 12°48′42″N 80°13′50″E
- Construction started: March 2008
- Completed: 2013
- Inaugurated: 2013

Height
- Roof: 108 m (354 ft)
- Top floor: 29

Technical details
- Floor count: 30

Design and construction
- Architect: Surbana International Consultants Pte. Ltd.
- Developer: True Value Homes

TVH Ouranya Bay Towers is a residential complex consisting of six 30-storied condominiums in Chennai, India. Located on Old Mahabalipuram Road, the towers were said to be the tallest residential buildings in Chennai at the time of their construction.

== History ==
The construction of the towers began in 2008 and was completed in 2013. The complex was designed by Surbana International Consultants Pte. Ltd. Arch.Jayakrishnan G Nair, then AVP at Surbana and subsequently Director of Jyan International Consultants Pte Ltd, Singapore was the principal designer.

== Location ==
The complex is located on Old Mahabalipuram Road at Padur in South Chennai. It lies about 500 feet away from the Muttukadu Lake, near the shore of the Bay of Bengal.

== The towers ==
The apartment complex contains six towers, each with 30 floors rising to 108 metres. It also contains a 7-storied club house covering 75,000 sq ft, a 4,000-sq-ft restaurant, and a 5,000-sq-ft banquet hall, in addition to 24 sky gardens, 30 serviced apartments, three swimming pools, and helipads for emergency exits.

== See also ==
- List of tallest buildings in Chennai
