= Akshaya Abov =

General information
- Type: Residential cum commercial
- Architectural style: Modernism
- Location: Padur, Chennai, India, Old Mahabalipuram Road, Padur, Chennai, Tamil Nadu, India

Height
- Roof: 132 m (433 ft)
- Top floor: 37

Technical details
- Floor count: 38
- Floor area: 23,650 m^{2} (254,600 sq ft)
- Lifts/elevators: 5 (2 passenger lifts, 1 bed lift, 1 service lift, and 1 retail area lift)

Design and construction
- Developer: Akshaya Homes
- Main contractor: Shapoorji Pallonji Group

Akshaya Abov is a residential-cum-commercial skyscraper in the neighbourhood of Padur in Chennai, India. The tower is 38 stories tall, with 31 residential units and 32 swimming pools. The tower is said to be the first building in the city to house one house per floor and the only building to have 31 homes with 32 swimming pools.

== History ==
The project was launched in October 2012 and construction began the same year. As of July 2019, 25 levels (of 38 levels) have been completed.

== Location ==
The tower is located on a plot of 1.66 acres in Padur, a southern neighbourhood of Chennai, on the Old Mahabalipuram Road.

== The tower ==
The tower is 132 m (433 ft) tall and has 38 floors, with floor plates of 6,700 square feet. The ground floor (Level 1) consists of the lobby and Levels 2 and 3 will have retail and commercial spaces, respectively. Levels 4 to 31 and Levels 35 and 36 will have residential condominiums, one per floor, besides a clubhouse on Level 34. Levels 37 and 38 are service floors. The tower has a total of 31 apartments, each with its own plunge pool, besides a common swimming pool for this residential skyscraper.

The tower also includes a restaurant, spa, clubhouse, private movie hall, and a business centre. The tower covers about 9 percent of the plot, with the remaining 1.5 acres used for landscaping.

== See also ==
- List of tallest buildings in Chennai
