= Padur, Chennai =

- Neighbourhood
- Padur, Chengalpattu district (Tamil Nadu)
- Coordinates: 12.807700°N 80.225800°E
- Country: India
- State: Tamil Nadu
- Metro: Chennai
- District: Chengalpattu
- Elevation: 31 m (102 ft)

Languages
  - Official: Tamil, English
  - Speech: Tamil, English
- Time zone: UTC+5:30 (IST)
- PIN: 603103
- Neighbourhoods: Siruseri, Kelambakkam, Navalur, Semmencherry, Thiruvidandai and Covelong
- District Collector: Mr. S. Arunraj, I. A. S.

Padur is a neighbourhood situated along the Old Mahabalipuram Road (OMR) in Chennai, Tamil Nadu. It lies approximately 35-40 kilometers south of Chennai city center and has become a popular area due to its proximity to the IT corridors of OMR, which house many technology companies, business parks, and educational institutions.

Padur is located at an altitude of about 31 m above the mean sea level with the geographical coordinates of 12.807700°N 80.225800°E. Padur is situated at about 2 km from Siruseri, one of the largest IT Parks in India.

Padur has a school viz., Hindustan International School. Also, it has an institution namely Hindustan Institute of Technology and Science (HITS) here in Padur.

Padur is served by a medical facility viz, Supreme Speciality Hospitals.

Krishnasamy alias Perumal Temple and Pazhandiyamman Temple here in Padur are under the control of Hindu Religious and Charitable Endowments Department Government of Tamil Nadu.
