= Arihant Majestic Towers =

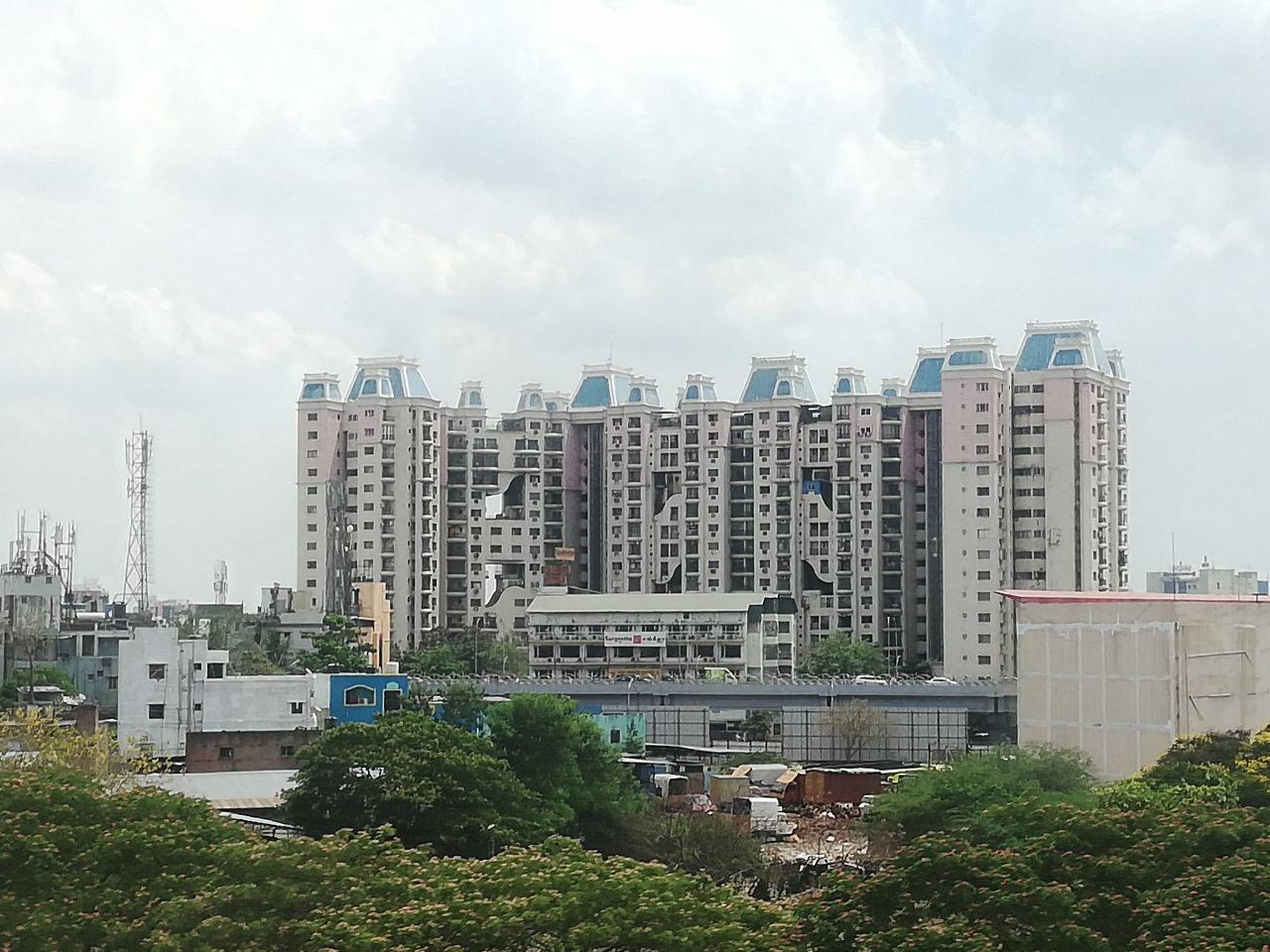
- Arihant Majestic Towers in April 2022

General information
- Type: Residential
- Architectural style: Modernism
- Location: Inner Ring Road, Koyambedu, Chennai, India, 216 Inner Ring Road, Koyambedu, Chennai, Tamil Nadu 600 107, India
- Coordinates: 13.07234°N 80.203395°E
- Construction started: January 2001
- Completed: March 2003
- Cost: ₹ 600 million

Height
- Roof: 63.24 m (207.5 ft)

Technical details
- Floor count: Ground + 16
- Floor area: 510,000 sq ft (47,000 m^{2})

Design and construction
- Architect: Deepak Mehta Associates
- Developer: Arihant Foundations & Housing Limited
- Main contractor: L&T Construction, Larsen & Toubro Limited

Arihant Majestic Towers is a 17-storied residential building in Chennai, India. At 63 meters, it is one of the first buildings that surpassed the LIC Building on Anna Salai as the tallest building in the city. It remained the tallest building in the city until the Hyatt Regency building was topped out.

== The towers ==
Located on the Inner Ring Road, opposite the Chennai Mofussil Bus Terminus, the complex consists of 310 housing units in 5 towers with a total built-up area of 510,000 sq ft. Built on 11.7 acres of land, the towers are 63 meters in height and have 16 floors. The complex includes amenities such as swimming pool, children's play area, library, and gymnasium.

== See also ==
- List of tallest buildings in Chennai
