= Chennai Central (disambiguation) =

Chennai Central is the main railway terminus in Chennai, Tamil Nadu, India.

Chennai Central may also refer to:

- Central Chennai, a part of the Chennai between the Coovum and Adyar rivers
- Central Square, city square around Chennai Central railway station
- Chennai Central (Lok Sabha constituency), a parliamentary constituency in Chennai
- Chennai Central metro station, an urban rail transit station in Chennai
- Vada Chennai, 2018 Tamil film, titled as Chennai Central in Hindi
