= Egattur (Chengalpattu District) =

- suburb
- Location in Chennai, India Egattur (Chengalpattu District) (India)
- Coordinates: 12.834063°N 80.228654°E
- Country: India
- State: Tamil Nadu
- District: Chengalpattu District
- Metro: Chennai

Government
  - Body: CMDA

Languages
  - Official: Tamil
- Time zone: UTC+5:30 (IST)
- Planning agency: CMDA

Egattur is a village in Chengalpattu district of Tamil Nadu, located on the southern outskirts of Chennai, India. It is a suburban area near the SIPCOT IT Park, Siruseri. It is located between Navalur and Kazhipathur along the Old Mahabalipuram Road parallel to Muttukadu on the East Coast Road.

== Geography ==
It also borders the Buckingham Canal that runs into the Muttukadu backwaters. Illegal dumping and environmental pollution have been serious concerns for Egattur residents.

== Transportation ==
The bus stop outside SIPCOT IT Park is the main bus stand of Egattur region.

== Education ==
The Mohammad Sathak A. J. College of Engineering is located in this region.

== Notable people ==
- Ekambaram Karunakaran
