= Central Square, Chennai =

Square in Chennai, Tamil Nadu, India

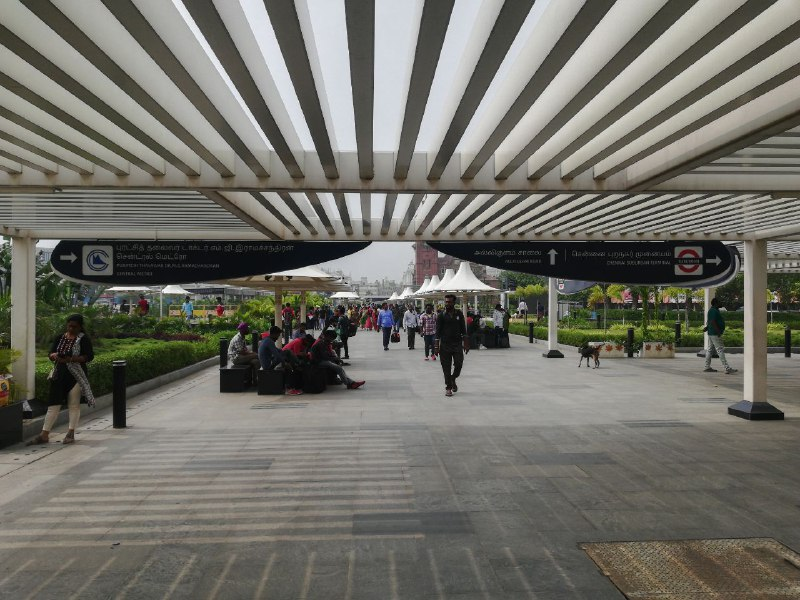
Ornamental trellis at Central Square Park

The Central Square is a city square and major intersection in Chennai. Areas surrounding the Ripon Building, Victoria Public Hall, Moore Market Complex, Chennai Central Railway Station, the Southern Railway Headquarters and the Government General Hospital are being developed as part of the Central Square. The total site area is estimated to be about 37,800 square meters (9.3 acres), and the development is estimated to cost about ₹4 billion (US$42 million) and will be funded by the CMDA.

== The square ==
The square will have a multi-storied parking lot in its basement, which will also form the foundation of the complex. The 3-storied parking lot will have the capacity to accommodate 1000 cars. The total area of the square will be 154,950 sq meters. A 119-meter-tall, 27-storey building will mark the center of the square. The Central Square is deemed to ease congestion along the Poonamallee High Road and integrate several modes of transportation in the city. Construction began in April 2019. In addition to underground passages and subways connecting people to Ripon Buildings, Park railway station, Park Town railway station, Chennai Central Railway Station, Moore Market Complex building, and the Rajiv Gandhi Government General Hospital, the intersection will have bus bays, auto stands, and taxi drop-off points to facilitate seamless travel from one mode of transport to another.

There are about 21 structures that are of historical importance in the Central Square area.

A Metro Rail museum showcasing the process that went into the construction of the city's Metro is being commissioned in Raja Sir Savalai Ramaswamy Mudaliar Choultry, a heritage building opposite the Chennai Central railway station.

== Progress ==
As of March 2020, fountains and beautification works were expected to be complete in three months and an underground parking and two pedestrian subways (renovation of the existing subway and construction of a new subway connecting Central Metro station) were expected to be complete in a year's time. The underground parking lot at the Chennai Park suburban railway station will have a capacity to accommodate more than 800 cars. Two more subways are under construction, one linking the Rajiv Gandhi Government General Hospital with Chennai Central and the other linking Evening Bazaar Road with Chennai Central.

Central Square was inaugurated by Chief Minister M. K. Stalin on 30 March 2022.

The foundation for 27-storied Chennai Central Square Tower to be built at a cost of ₹ 3500 million was laid in February 2025. Spread over 14,280 square metres, the 119-metre-high tower will have a mix of retail, office and business spaces. The lower floors (ground to 4th) will have retail and commercial outlets, while floors 5 to 24 will have office spaces. While the 25th floor will house service facilities, the top two floors will be premium business and commercial spaces. The four basement levels will accommodate parking and other facilities.

== See also ==
- List of city squares by size
