= SPR Highliving District Towers =

- SPR City
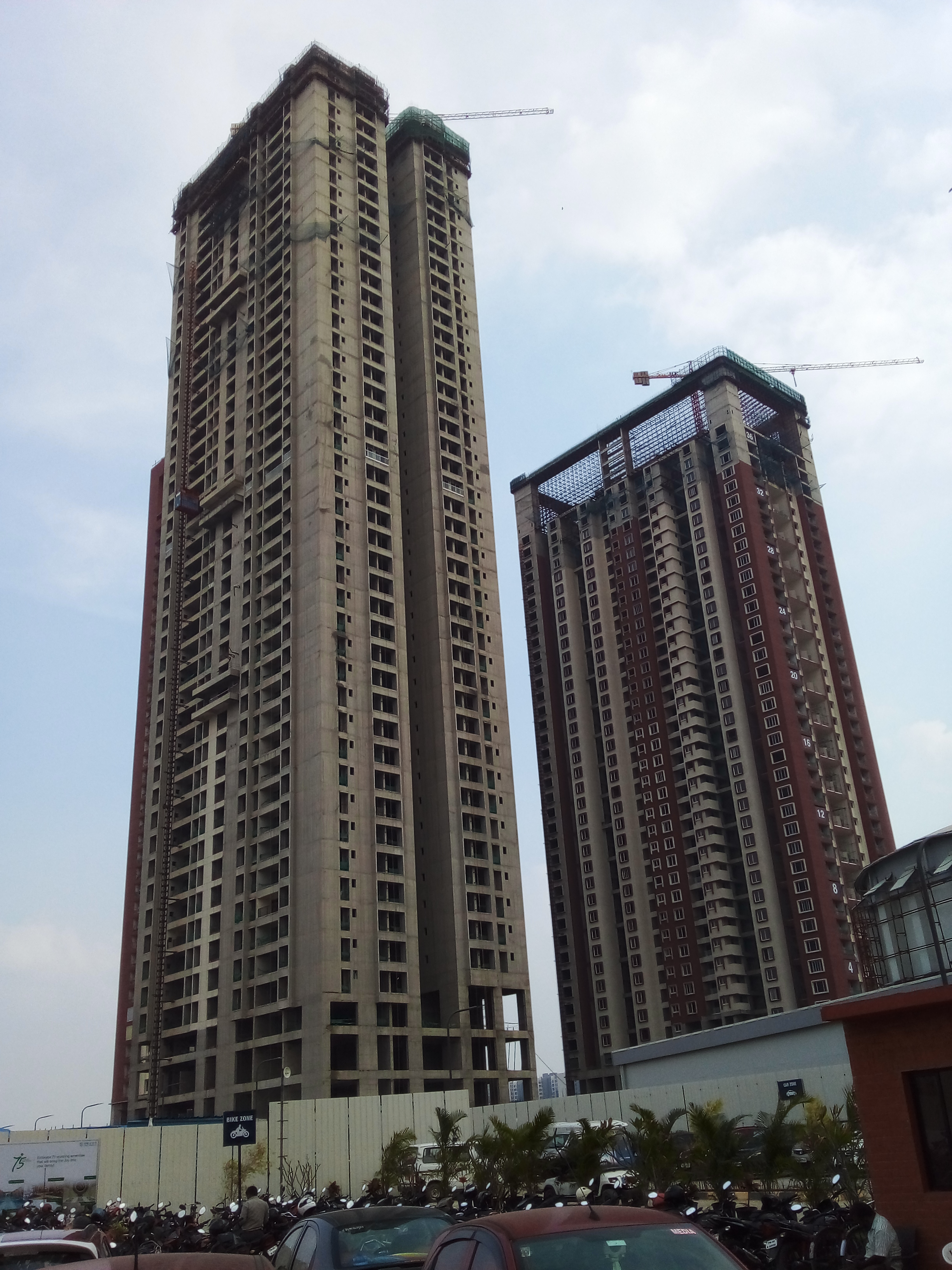

Record height
- Surpassed by: Ancourage, House of Hiranandani

General information
- Type: Residential
- Architectural style: Modernism
- Location: Perambur, Chennai, Tamilnadu, India
- Construction started: 2018
- Completed: 2020

Height
- Roof: Tower A: 144 m (472 ft); Tower B: 144 m (472 ft); Tower H: 172 m (564 ft)
- Top floor: Tower A: 36; Tower B: 36; Tower H: 45

Technical details
- Floor count: Tower A: 36; Tower B: 36; Tower H: 45

Design and construction
- Developer: SPR City

SPR Highliving District is a residential complex consisting of three residential skyscrapers in the neighbourhood of Perambur in Chennai, India. The tallest of them is a 45-storied building, which is the tallest residential building in Chennai.

== History ==
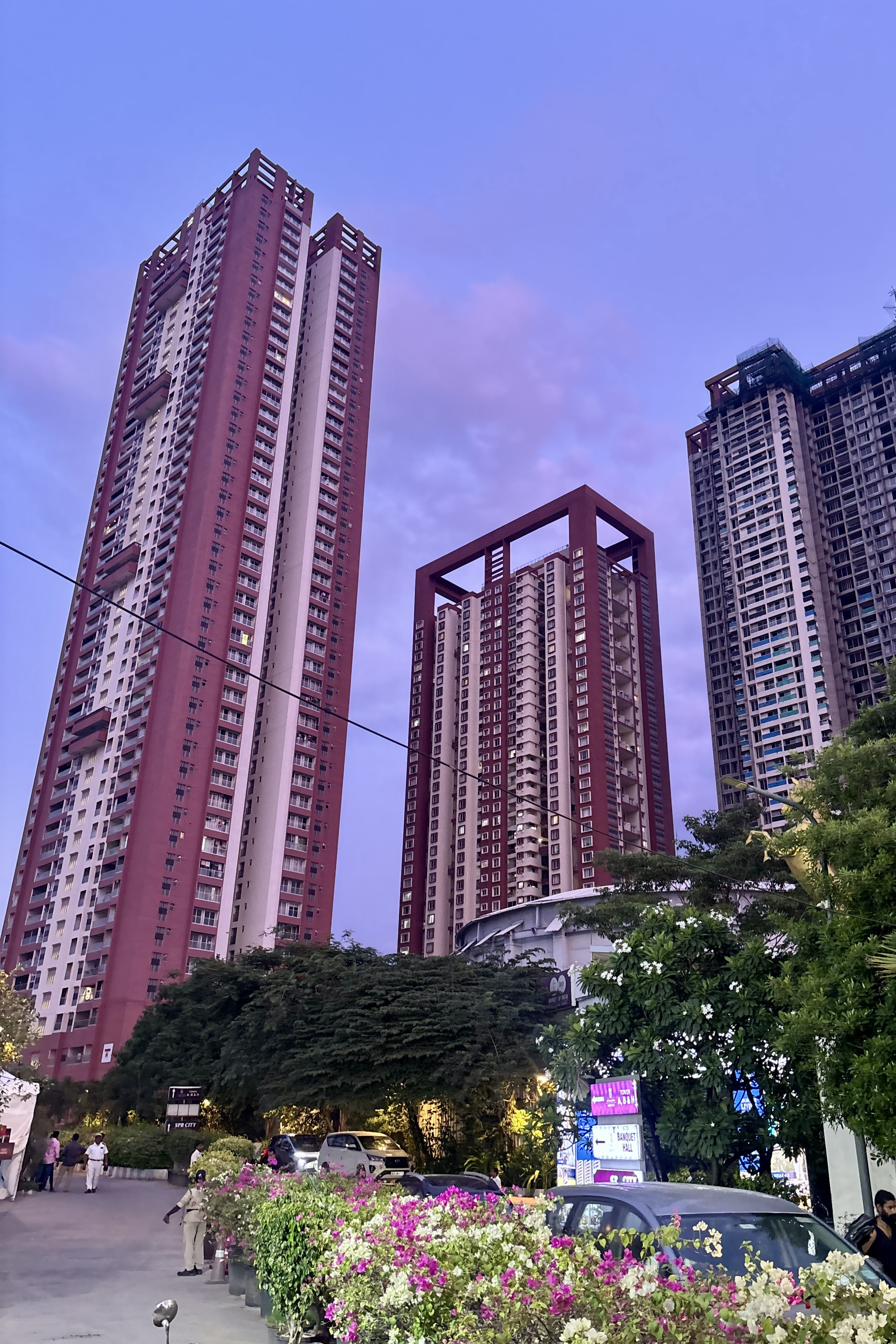
SPR City Highliving Chennai

In the 2019 Global Investors Meet, the SPR India, a real estate developer in South India, signed an MoU with the Tamil Nadu government to invest ₹55,000 million towards real estate projects in the state. Part of this investment is an approximately 65-acre integrated township at the Binny Mills in Perambur. Construction began in 2018 and was completed in 2020.

== Location ==
The towers are located on a plot of 18 acres known as the SPR Highliving Towers, which is part of the 63.89-acre SPR City Chennai's largest integrated township in Perambur. The residential apartments have three towers in the first phase and a 3.5-acre park, which is said to be the largest private park in the city.

== The towers ==
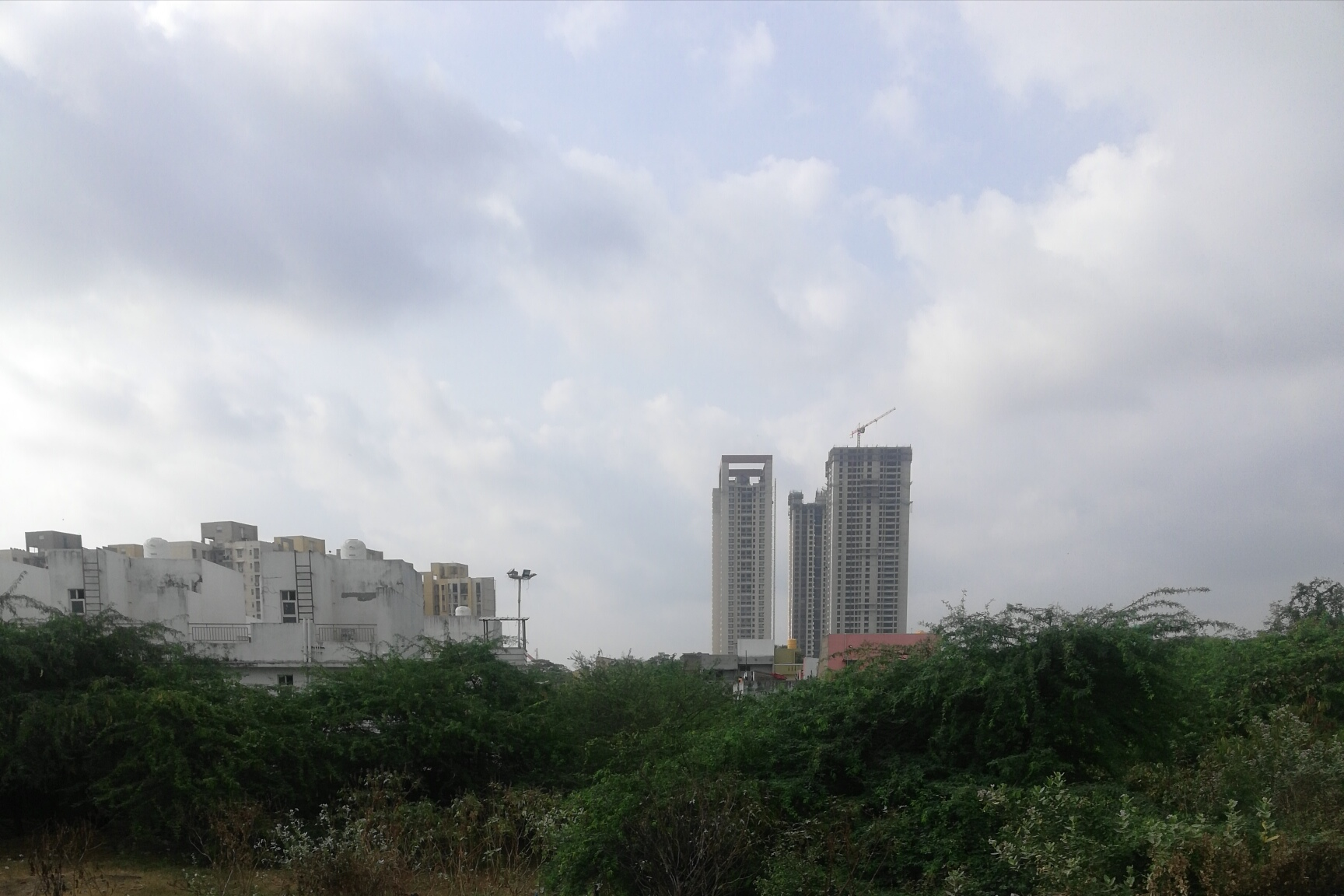
SPR City Highliving District Towers under construction

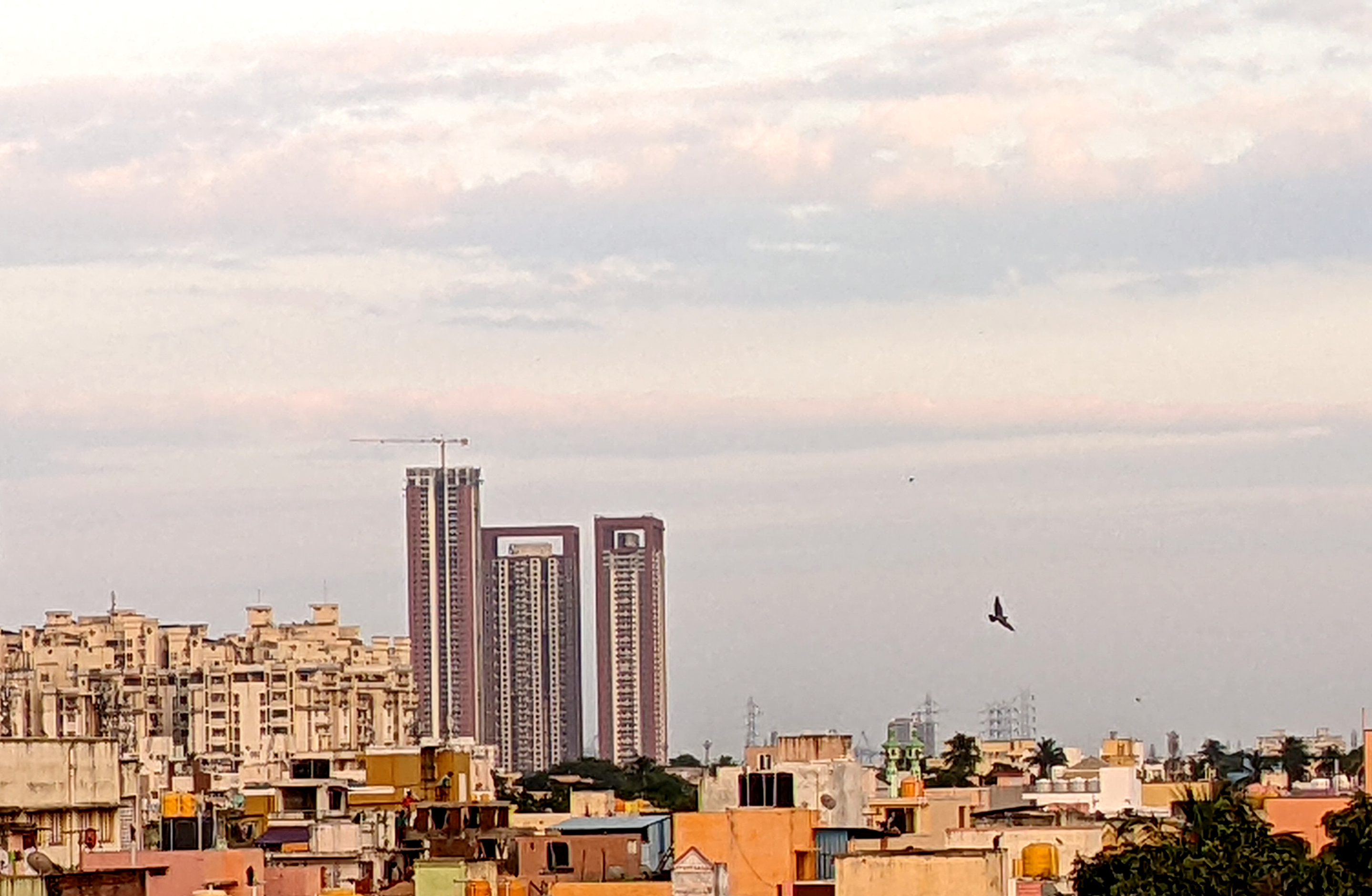
The towers as of January 2022

The three towers together have 684 apartments. Towers A and B have 36 floors each and are 144 m (472 ft) tall. Tower H has 45 floors and reaches a height of 172.5 m (566 ft). Tower A will have 216 apartments, Tower B will have 288, and Tower H will have 162.5. The towers will have double basement floor, ground floor and 2 upper floors for shops, and the residential floors rising up to 48 floors.

The township has a total built-up area of 5.5 million sq ft, including three million sq ft of shopping area and 2.5 million sq ft of residential infrastructure, warehousing and parking.

It also houses a leading cricket academy and a leading badminton academy. The Shri Ram Universal School has already commenced its operations in the township. The township also includes 11-screened theatre, commercial trade center, and the country's largest multi-commodity wholesale trade centre known as the Market of India, which will have more than 5,000 shops and 300 retail outlets. The integrated township project is expected to generate more than 133,000 employment opportunities, both direct and indirect.

After the completion of SPR City Phase 1, SPR City Phase 2 to have Towers C, E, F, G, I to soar to a height of 172 m (564 ft) with 45 floors each and Tower D to be the 65 storied tallest skyscraper with a height of 243 m (797 ft) . An approval from AAI for a maximum height of 243m has also been received. A hospital tower of 12 floors and a mall and an IT park have also been proposed as a part of Phase 2.

== Planned developments ==
Of the buildings planned to be built in the second phase of SPR City, Towers C, E, F, G will rise to a height of 161 m and Tower D to a height of 243 m. With 70 floors, Tower D will be the tallest skyscraper in the city upon completion.

== See also ==
- List of tallest buildings in Chennai
