= World Trade Center Chennai =

Skyscraper office buildings in Chennai

- WTC Office Towers and Residences

General information
- Type: Office
- Location: Perungudi, Chennai, India, 110 Old Mahabalipuram Road, Perungudi, Chennai 600096
- Coordinates: 12°57′42″N 80°14′43″E
- Construction started: 2013
- Completed: 2020
- Owner: Brigade Group, GIC

Height
- Antenna spire: 122 m (400 ft) (Tower 1); 88 m (289 ft) (Tower 2)
- Roof: 106 m (348 ft) (Tower 1); 81 m (266 ft) (Tower 2)
- Top floor: 27 (Tower A); 19 (Tower B)

Technical details
- Floor count: 28 (Tower A); 20 (Tower B)
- Floor area: 170,000 m^{2} (1,800,000 sq ft); Tower 1: 110,000 m^{2} or 1,200,000 sq ft Tower 2: 56,000 m^{2} or 600,000 sq ft

Design and construction
- Architects: HOK, New York
- Developer: Brigade Group (India) and GIC (Singapore)

References
- Tower 1 Tower 2

The World Trade Center, Chennai is a 28-storeyed commercial and residential centre in Chennai, India. Located at Perungudi, it was made operational in March 2020. The centre consists of 170,000 square metres (1,800,000 sq ft) of office space. The complex also includes a conference/exhibition centre. The towers are IGBC LEED Platinum and USGBC LEED Gold certified. The centre is a member of the World Trade Centers Association (WTCA). Tower A of the WTC complex is the tallest commercial establishment in the city. The development is part of the larger expansion of the Old Mahabalipuram Road (OMR) corridor as a major IT and commercial hub in Chennai.

== History ==
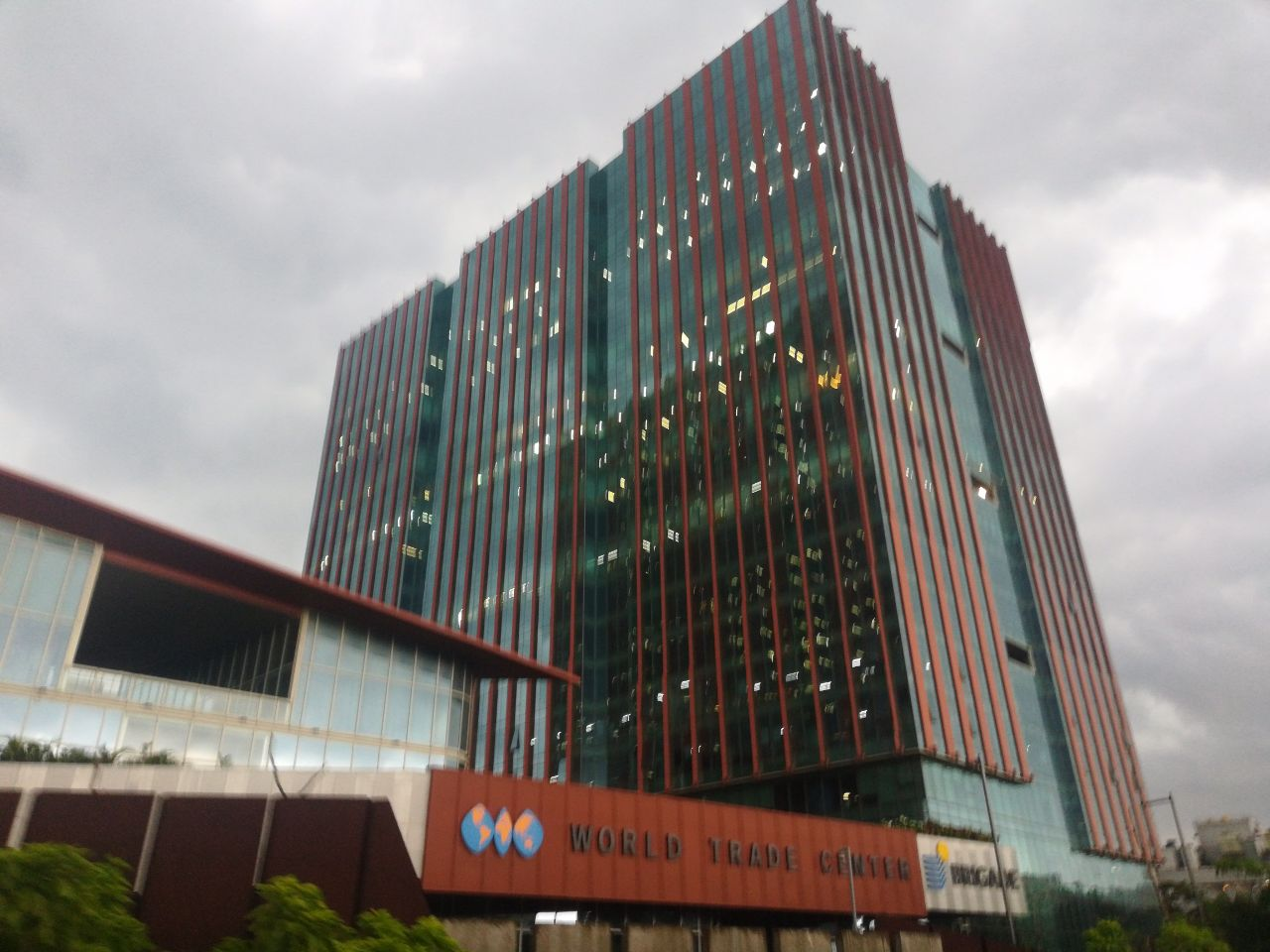
North Tower (Tower B) as in June 2024

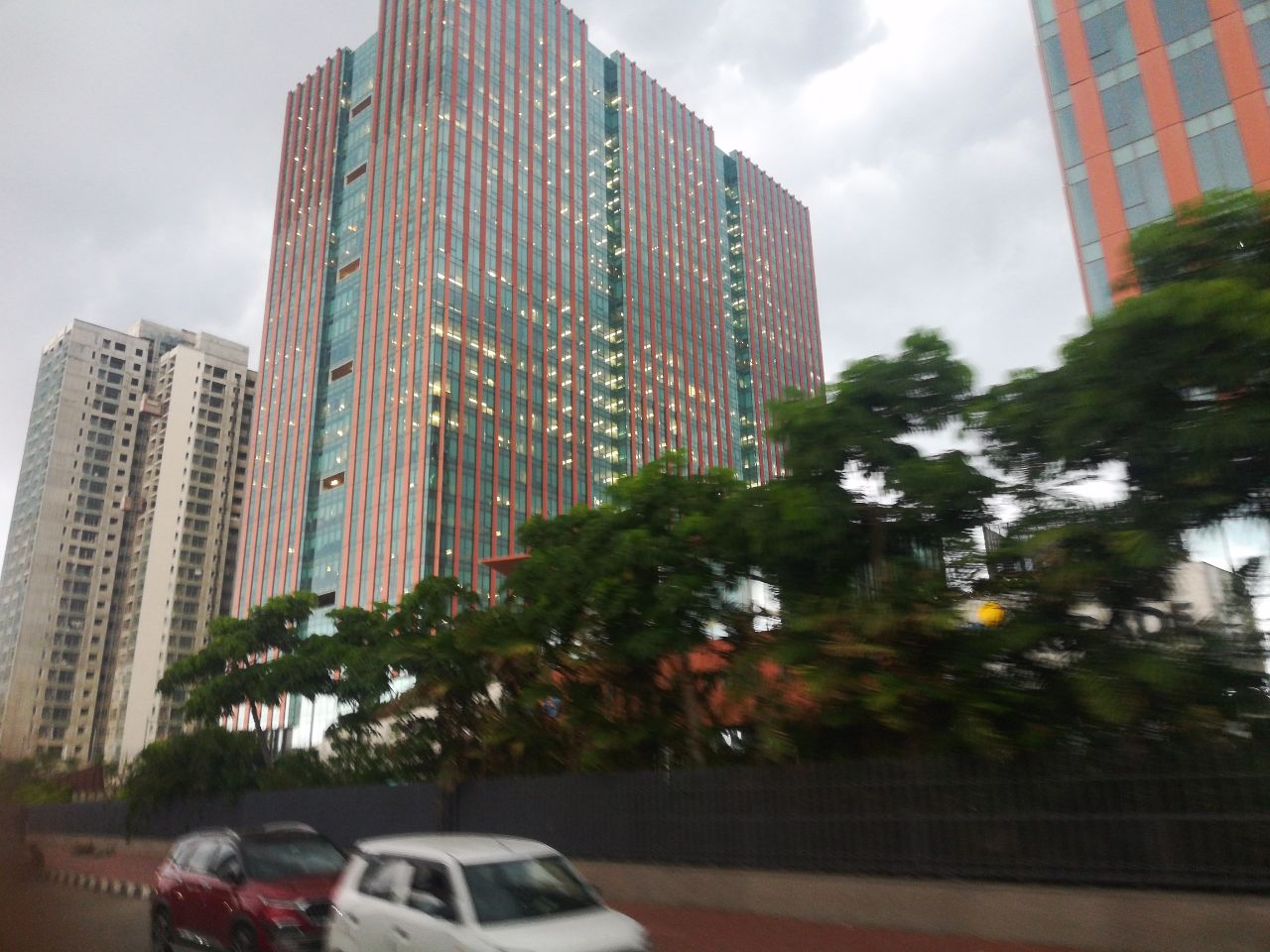
South Tower (Tower A) as in June 2024

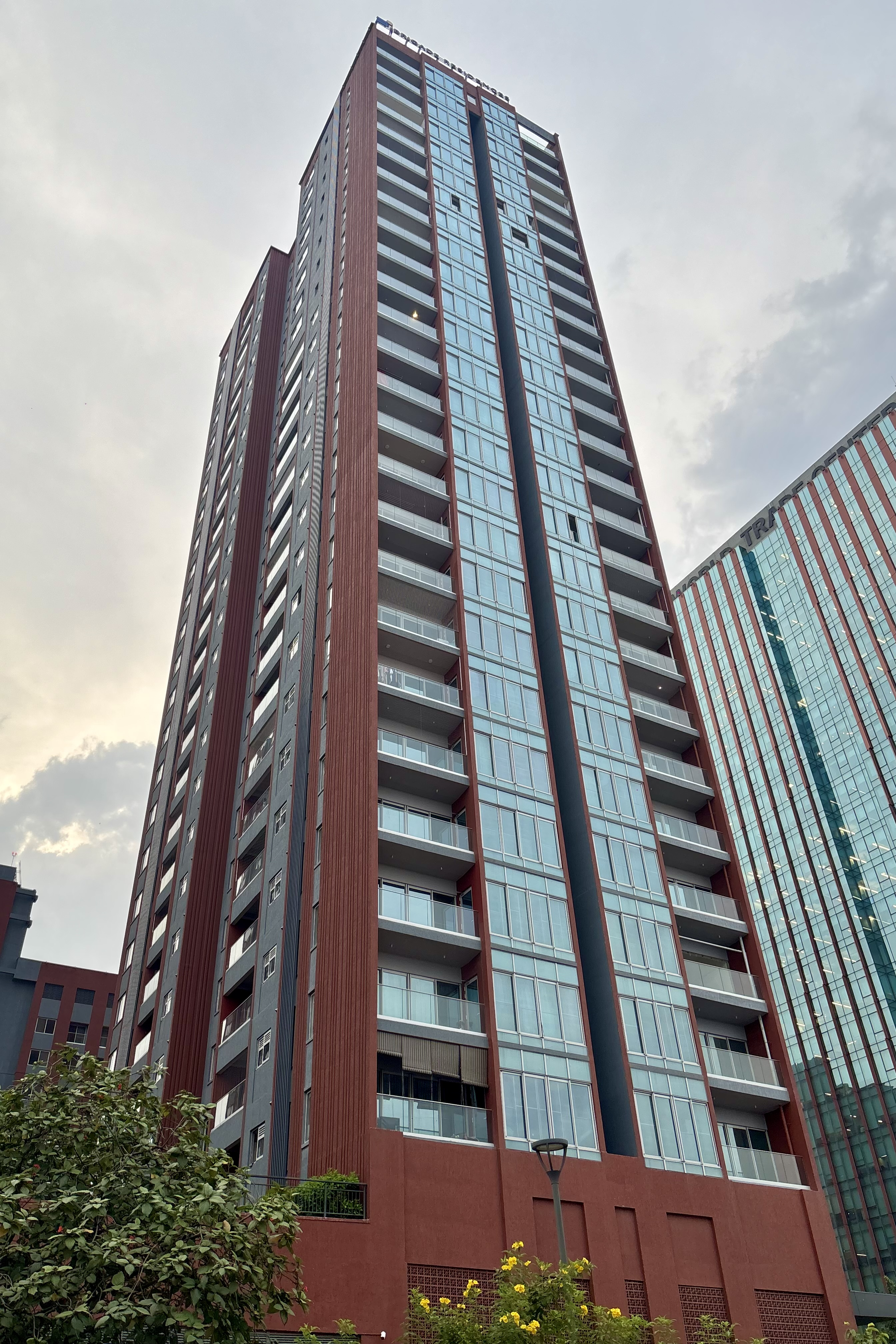
One of the Brigade Residences Towers, the 28-storied residential buildings within the WTC complex

In 2016, India's Brigade Group and Singapore's GIC, a sovereign wealth fund, jointly acquired a 6.5-hectare (16-acre) land parcel at Perungudi, purchased from Kansai Nerolac Paints for ₹5,378.6 million (equivalent to ₹8.4 billion or US$90 million in 2026). The land acquisition was facilitated by Perungudi Real Estates, a special purpose vehicle formed by Brigade Enterprises and GIC, with the help of real estate firm Jones Lang LaSalle (JLL). Construction of a world trade centre (WTC) and residential units, entailing an investment of more than ₹10 billion (equivalent to ₹16 billion or US$170 million in 2026) was planned on the land. The foundation stone was laid on 9 June 2017. Initially expected to be operational by March 2020, the centre became functional officially in September 2021. The project’s phased construction was aligned with Chennai’s growing commercial real estate requirements, with the WTC designed to serve both multinational tenants and emerging Indian technology firms.

== The complex ==
The complex consists of five towers, including two office towers, a hotel tower and two residential towers (the latter three are currently under construction). Built on a 6.1-hectare (15-acre) plot and developed as a Grade A++ commercial development, all the towers have three basements. The first office tower (Tower A) has 28 floors (ground and 27 floors) above the street, the second office tower (Tower B) 20 floors (ground and 19 floors), the third tower (hotel) 8 floors, and the fourth (restaurant) and the fifth (cafeteria and utility) towers 5 floors each. The total floor space of the construction would be 230,000 square metres (2,500,000 sq ft). The 28-storied Tower A has a total floor space of 0.11 million square metres (1.2 million square feet), with a typical floor area of 4,600 square metres (50,000 sq ft). Tower B has a typical floor area of 4,100 square metres (44,000 sq ft). The complex has three levels of combined basement and includes development of more than 0.17 million square metres (1.8 million square feet) of premium office space spread across two towers. The campus includes landscaped open areas, multi-level parking, and centralized amenities, consistent with WTCA’s standards for mixed-use business districts. Upon completion, Tower A will be the tallest commercial structure in Chennai. It consists of premium retail and hotel within the campus. The complex has a frontage of 350 metres (1,150 ft) on the Old Mahabalipuram Road. Once fully operational, the WTC can house 20,000 to 25,000 employees. 298-unit high-end residential apartments will also be constructed. The apartment block consists of 27-storeyed (G+26) twin towers to be built on 2.0 hectares (5 acres) of land. Besides, there will be another tower with 80 Marriott Exclusive apartments. These towers are to be completed by October 2024. A public park has also been constructed along with a basketball court.

The development will be led by the WTCA. The WTC has become an important landmark of Chennai city.

The total development potential of the complex is 0.24 million square metres (2.6 million square feet).

== Operations ==
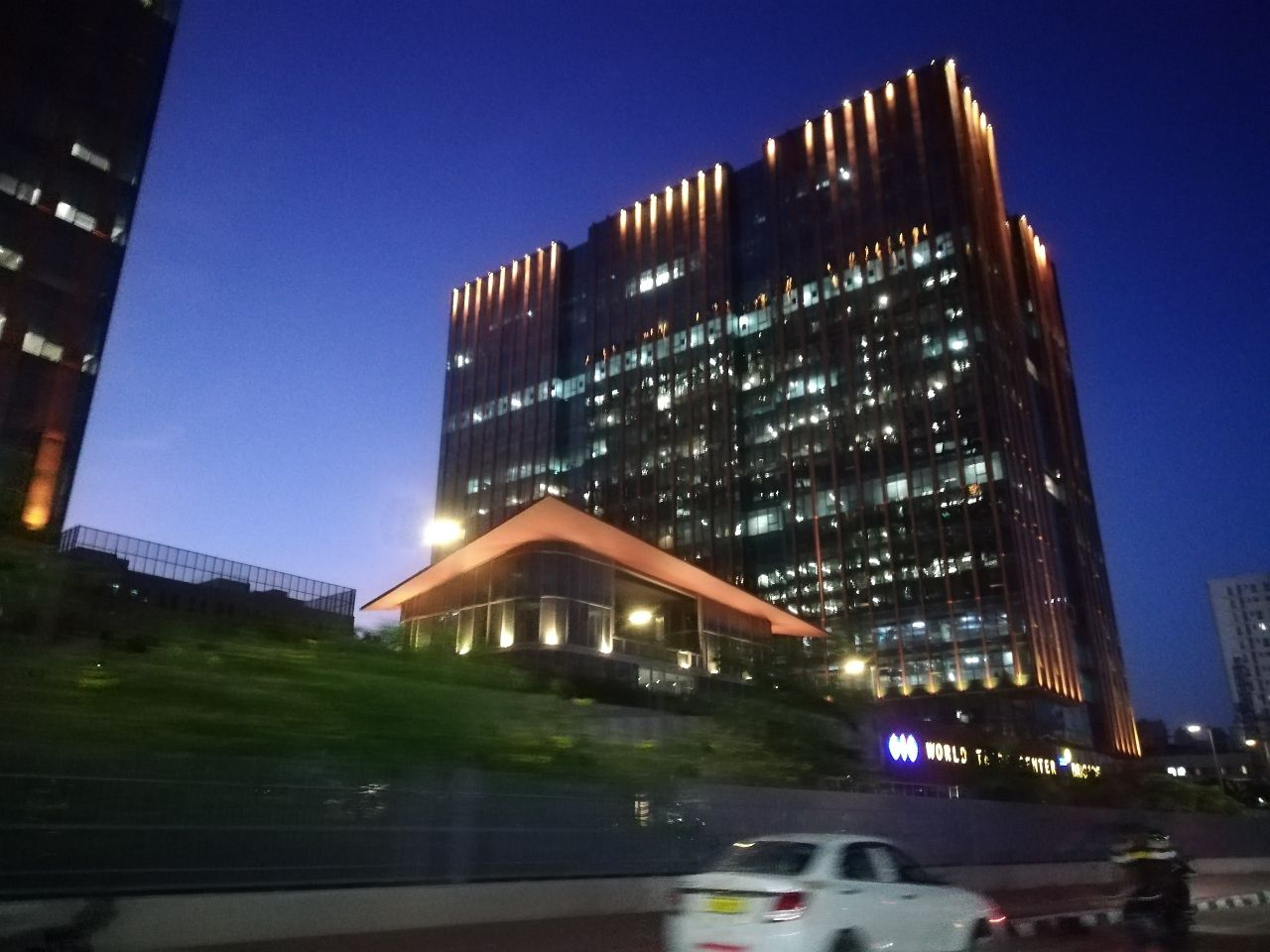
Night view of WTC Tower B

The WTC officially become functional in September 2021 with its first occupant, Kissflow Inc., a software-as-a-service (SaaS) company, moving its 350 employees into its WTC office. In March 2022, Amazon opened its office at the WTC, occupying 18 floors across 77,000 square metres (830,000 sq ft) to accommodate 6,000 employees. In November 2023, Hapag-Lloyd Technology Center began its operations at the WTC.

As of June 2024, the WTC is over 90% leased and houses marquee tenants.

== See also ==
- List of world trade centers
- List of tallest buildings in Chennai
- Architecture of Chennai
- List of twin buildings and structures
