= Hiranandani Parks, Chennai =

- Hirco Palace Gardens
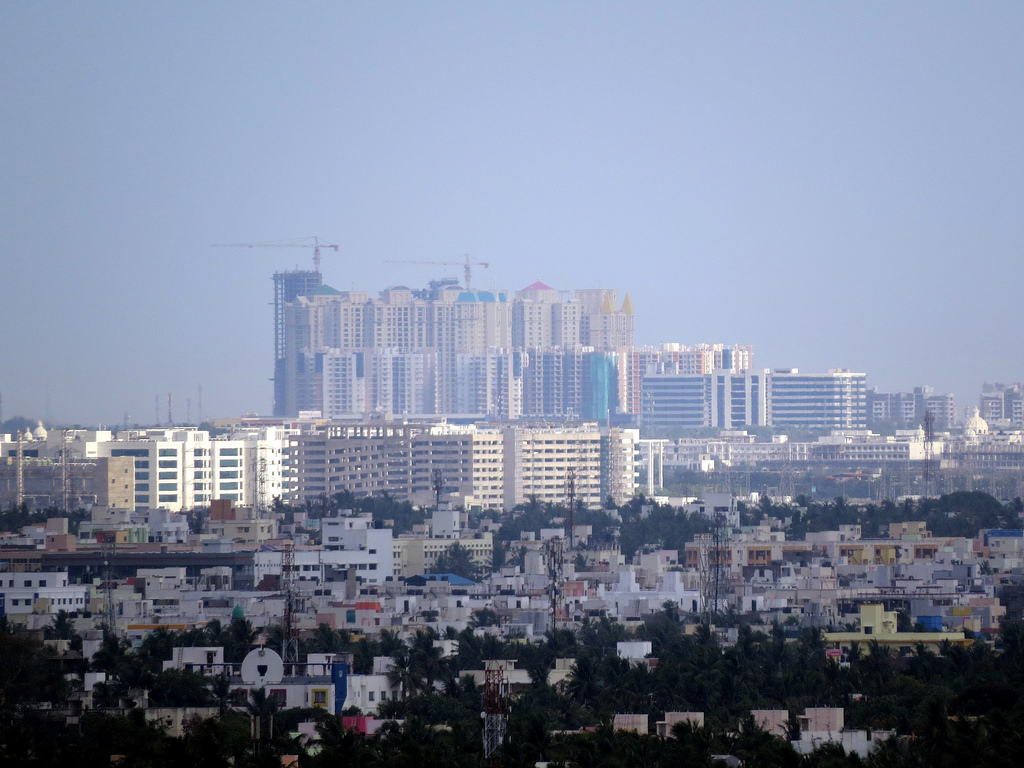
- The Hiranandani Parks towers dominating the skyline

General information
- Type: Residential
- Architectural style: Neo-classical
- Location: Oragadam, Chennai, India, Oragadam, Chennai, Tamil Nadu, India

Height
- Roof: 104 m (341 ft)

Design and construction
- Developer: Hiranandani Builders

Hiranandani Parks, formerly known as Hirco Palace Gardens, is a 149-hectare (369-acre) residential township consisting of several skyscraper condominiums in Chennai, India. It is located in the southern suburb of Oragadam.

== History ==
In 2006, the Mumbai-based real estate company Hiranandani Group bought close to 190 hectares (480 acres) of land in Palur village.

== Location ==
The township is located at Oragadam in South Chennai.

== The towers ==
Built on a 153-hectare (379-acre) plot, the complex consists of 27 high-rise towers ranging from 16 floors to 28 floors. The tallest towers are 104 m (341 ft) high.

A township has a 820-foot (250 m), 12-bay golf driving range, and a nine-hole, resort-style golf course planned on 20 hectares (50 acres).

The towers within the complex are listed in the table below:

S. No.	Name	Image	Height m (ft)	Floors	Year	Notes
1	Warwick			16		Stilt + 15 floors
2	Chartwell			16		Stilt + 15 floors
3	Chatsworth			27		Stilt + 26 floors
4	Clarendon			27		Stilt + 26 floors
5	Wilton		104 (341)	28		Stilt + 27 floors
6	Windsor		104 (341)	28		Stilt + 27 floors
7	Belvoir		104 (341)	28		Stilt + 27 floors
8	Belchamp		104 (341)	28		Stilt + 27 floors

== See also ==
- List of tallest buildings in Chennai
