= Ramee Mall =

Shopping mall in Chennai, India

Ramee Mall is a shopping mall in Anna Salai, Teynampet, Chennai, India. The mall with 2,25,000 sq.ft of built up area was opened in March 2012. Built by Dubai-based Ramee group, the mall occupies the first three floors of the property. The remaining 15 floors are occupied by Hyatt Regency Chennai. French sports goods chain Decathlon occupies the first two floors and is the only outlet in the mall.
