= Semmencherry =

- Neighbourhood
- Location in Chennai, India Semmencherry (Tamil Nadu) Semmencherry (India)
- Coordinates: 12.859293°N 80.226352°E
- Country: India
- State: Tamil Nadu
- District: Chennai
- Metro: Chennai

Government
  - Body: CMDA

Languages
  - Official: Tamil
- Time zone: UTC+5:30 (IST)
- PIN: 600 119
- Vehicle registration: TN-14
- Civic agency: CMDA

Semmencherry is a neighbourhood in Chennai, Tamil Nadu, India. It is situated in Chennai district, located south of the city about 30 km from the city centre, along the Old Mahabalipuram Road a.k.a. Rajiv Gandhi Salai. Semmencherry is located between Sholinganallur and Navalur. The suburb has experienced rapid development with the advent of IT companies along the Old Mahabalipuram Road.

Sri Srinivasa temple, a temple from the Pallava era and a notified heritage structure by the Archaeological Survey of India, is located in this suburb. One of the oldest temples along the 45 km stretch between Madhya Kailash and Mamallapuram, the temple was renovated in February 2009, for the first time since 1957.

The Elite Grand, a 5-star hotel, is located here.
