= Hyatt Regency Chennai =

Luxury hotel in Chennai, India

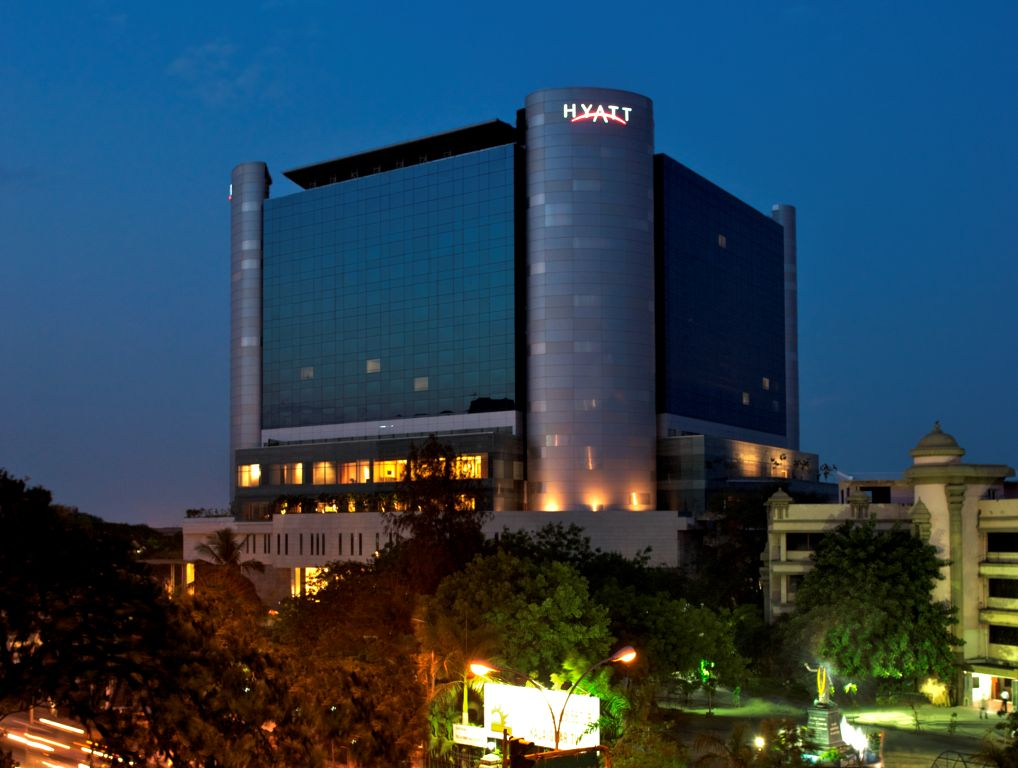
- Hyatt Regency Chennai
- Interactive map of the Hyatt Regency Chennai area
- Hotel chain: Hyatt Hotels Corporation

General information
- Location: India, 365, Anna Salai, Teynampet; Chennai, Tamil Nadu
- Coordinates: 13.042925°N 80.248569°E
- Opening: 2011
- Operator: Hyatt Hotels Corporation

Height
- Height: Total: 71 m (233 ft); Top floor: 62.76 m (205.9 ft)

Technical details
- Floor count: 18
- Floor area: 74,000 m^{2} (800,000 sq ft)

Design and construction
- Architect: P.G. Patki Associates

Other information
- Number of rooms: 327 (including 21 suites)
- Parking: 300 vehicles

Website
- chennai.regency.hyatt.com

Hyatt Regency Chennai is an 18-storey five-star luxury hotel located on Anna Salai at Teynampet in Chennai, India. Designed in 1986, the construction of the hotel started in the 1990s. However, the completion was delayed for nearly two decades and the hotel was opened on 10 August 2011 at a cost of ₹5.50 billion. Built on 18,510 square metres (199,200 sq ft) of land, it is the first Hyatt hotel in South India and has 327 rooms.

== History ==
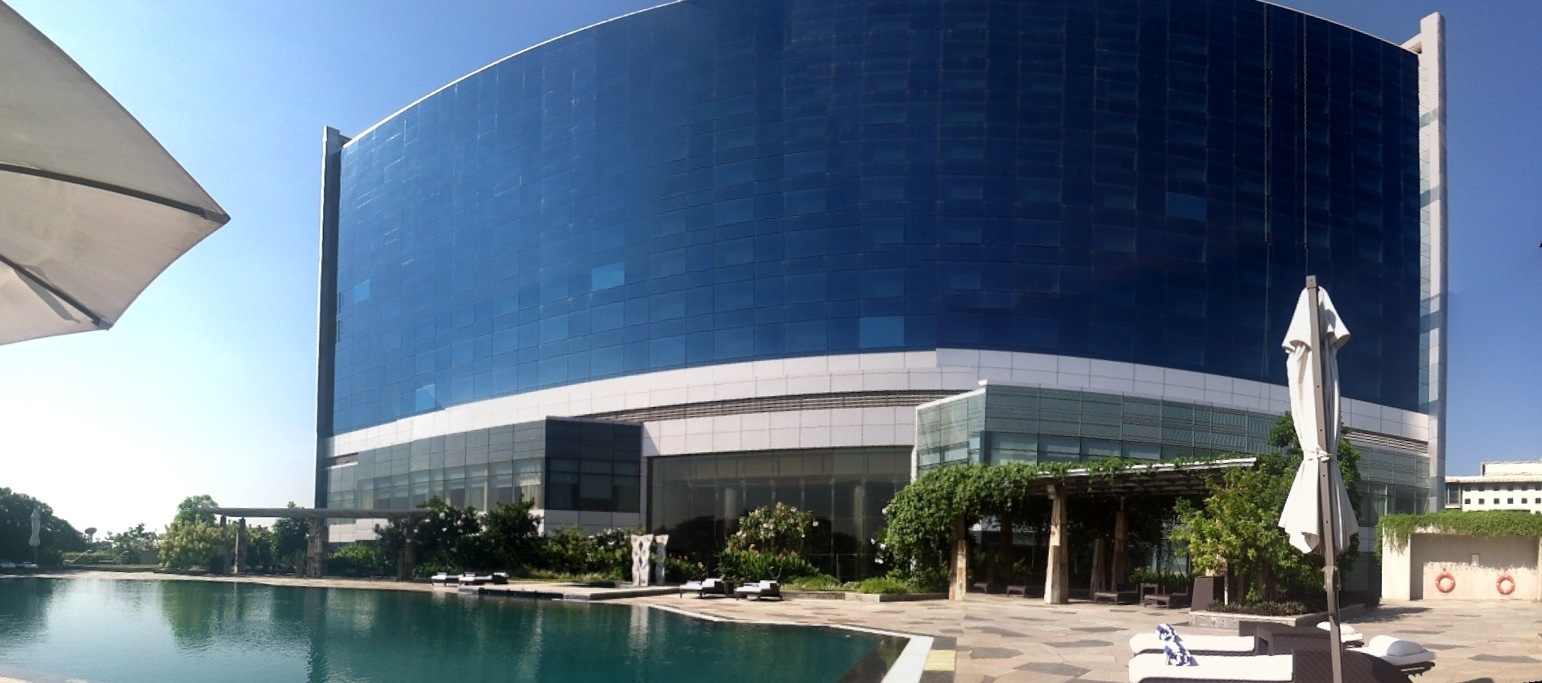
Swimming pool at the hotel

From a map of the city in 1942, the property can be traced back to a house called "Teynampet Villa", a government property allotted to P. S. Viswanatha Iyer, ICS, in the late 1940s. The area was then occupied by a bungalow named "Abbotsbury." In the 1950s, it was replaced by C. S. Loganatha Mudaliar with the city's first purpose-built community hall, which was later sold out to J. H. Tarapore. Soon the Tarapore property was given to the Sai Baba of Puttaparthi, who later sold it to Magunta Subbarami Reddy, the founder of the Balaji Group of Hotels. The structure was demolished to build a luxury hotel with a helipad with about 320 rooms and 23,000 m^{2} (250,000 sq ft) of commercial space. With the collaboration of the Oberoi Group of Hotels, Balaji Group of Hotels started building the structure in 1989 at a cost of ₹2.90 billion. However, after the murder of Magunta Subbarami Reddy in 1995, the group was caught in a financial crisis and the work on the project, initially named Magunta Oberoi, ceased in 2000 when about 75 percent of the work was complete. Consequently, the Oberois withdrew from the project the same year and it could not be completed in time. In 2006, the unfinished property was to be acquired by Lalit Suri, for ₹3.90 billion. However, after the death of Lalit Suri, Robust Hotels Private Limited, belonging to the Saraf Group, purchased the unfinished hotel development from IFCI and TFCI in mid-2007 and appointed Confluence, an international consultancy firm, to manage the completion of the project, which started remodelling the structure in 2008 and completed in February 2011. The retail space was bought from ICICI by Ramee Guestline Hotels. With the acquisition by the Saraf Group, the hotel was opened as Hyatt Regency Chennai on 8 August 2011.

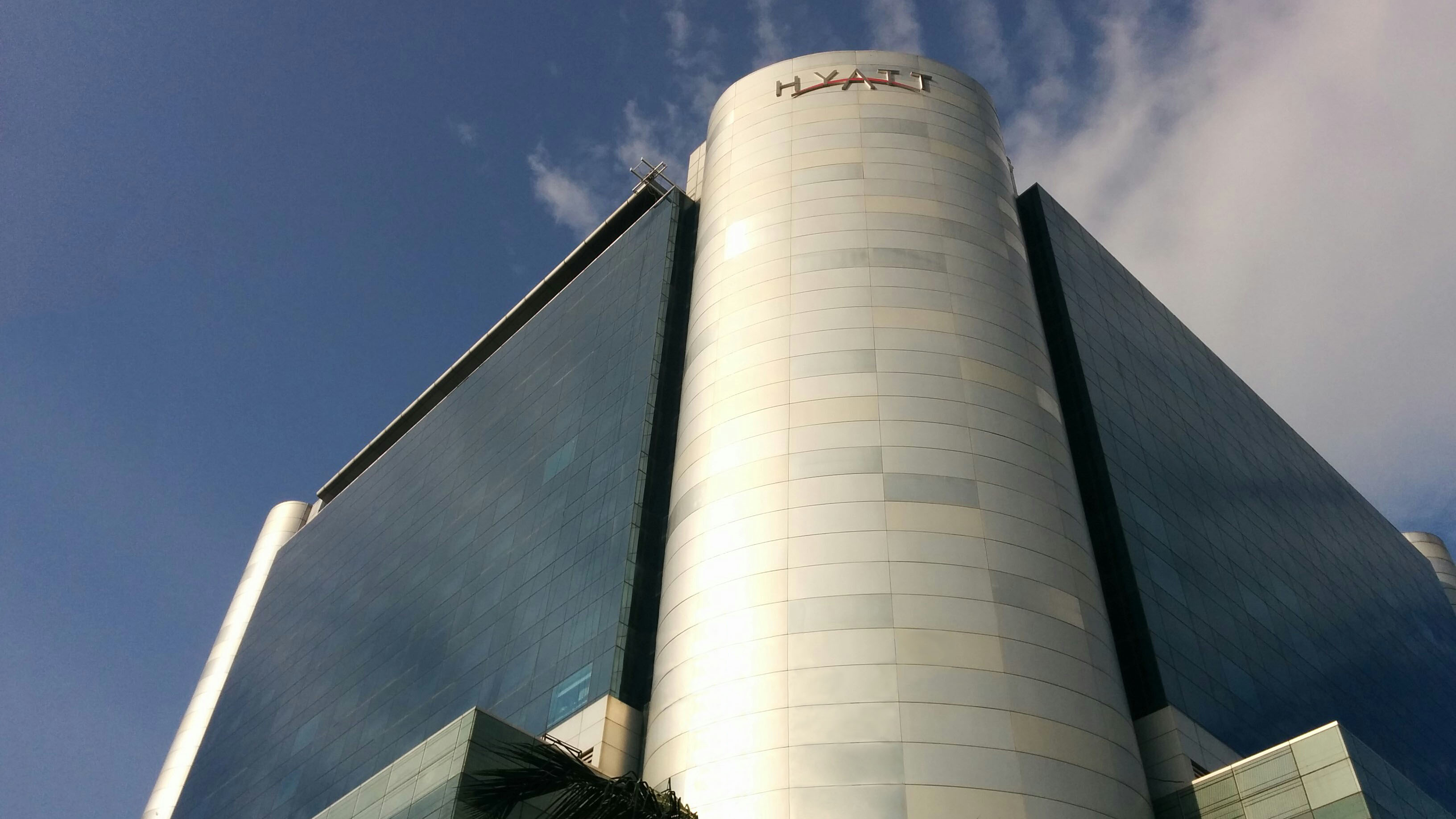
The hotel tower as seen from below

== The hotel ==
The hotel is 18 floors tall and has a total of 327 rooms, including 21 suites, and covers about 56,000 m^{2} (600,000 sq ft), with more than 1,900 m^{2} (20,000 sq ft) of versatile convention and event space and a sun-filled atrium lobby with water features and green landscaping. It also has a fitness centre; the Chic Lobby Lounge; Biscotti, the hotel's gourmet deli; Spice Haat, the 240-seat all-day-dining buffet restaurant; and Stix, serving authentic Chinese cuisine from the Sichuan region. The Spice Haat has five interactive kitchens across a space of over 840 m^{2} (9,000 sq ft). Each of the five live kitchens specialises in a specific culinary genre within the Indian Comfort food landscape. The Lobby Lounge, the 24-hour lounge, is set amidst the indoor green landscaping under the hotel atrium. The hotel also has an outdoor pool, which overlooks the city, and is set amidst custom-made art installations and lush landscaping. Additional hotel services and amenities include Regency Club, the Siddh Spa, the hotel's premium suites, specialty restaurant and a bar. The hotel also houses one of the largest collections of publicly displayed art installations in the country created by more than 40 national and international artists.

== The mall ==
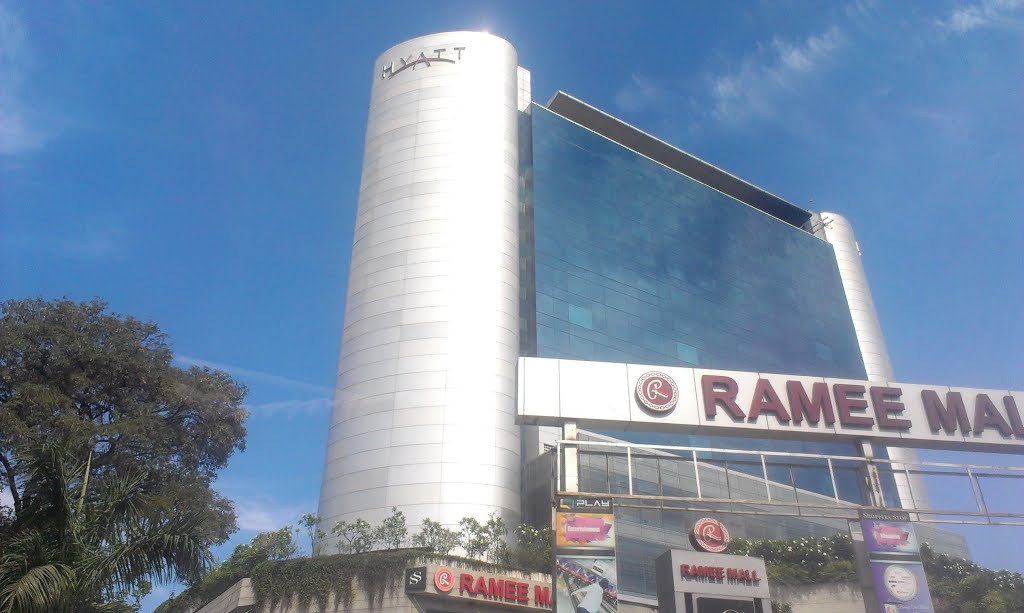
The mall-side entrance of the hotel

The first three floors, including half the ground floor and the first floor and the whole of the second floor, of the hotel building has been developed as a boutique shopping mall named as the Ramee Mall developed by Ramani Hotels Ltd at a cost of ₹1.20 billion. Designed by architect P. G. Patki, the mall has a gross leasable area of 14,000 m^{2} (150,000 sq ft) for 35 stores with a floor-to-floor height of 4.2 m (14 ft) and has a parking provision for 200 four-wheelers and 350 two-wheelers. The mall has 2 pairs of escalators and 4 passenger elevators, in addition to 2 separate service elevators for retail.

The total carpet area of retail space in the mall is about 20,300 m^{2} (219,000 sq ft): 4,100 m^{2} (44,000 sq ft) at the entrance, 4,600 m^{2} (50,000 sq ft) on the first floor, 7,000 m^{2} (75,000 sq ft) on the second floor and 4,600 m^{2} (50,000 sq ft) as parking space to be spread over two floors. A third of the retail space (4,600 m^{2} or 50,000 sq ft) has been leased out to Shoppers Stop and another 1,400 m^{2} (15,000 sq ft) has been occupied by a book store. Apart from the large-format stores, there are about 30 vanilla stores (small shops each occupying less than 93 m^{2} or 1,000 sq ft) and a 1,400 m^{2} (15,000 sq ft) food court in the mall, in addition to a dining restaurant, a spa and a salon.

== Events ==
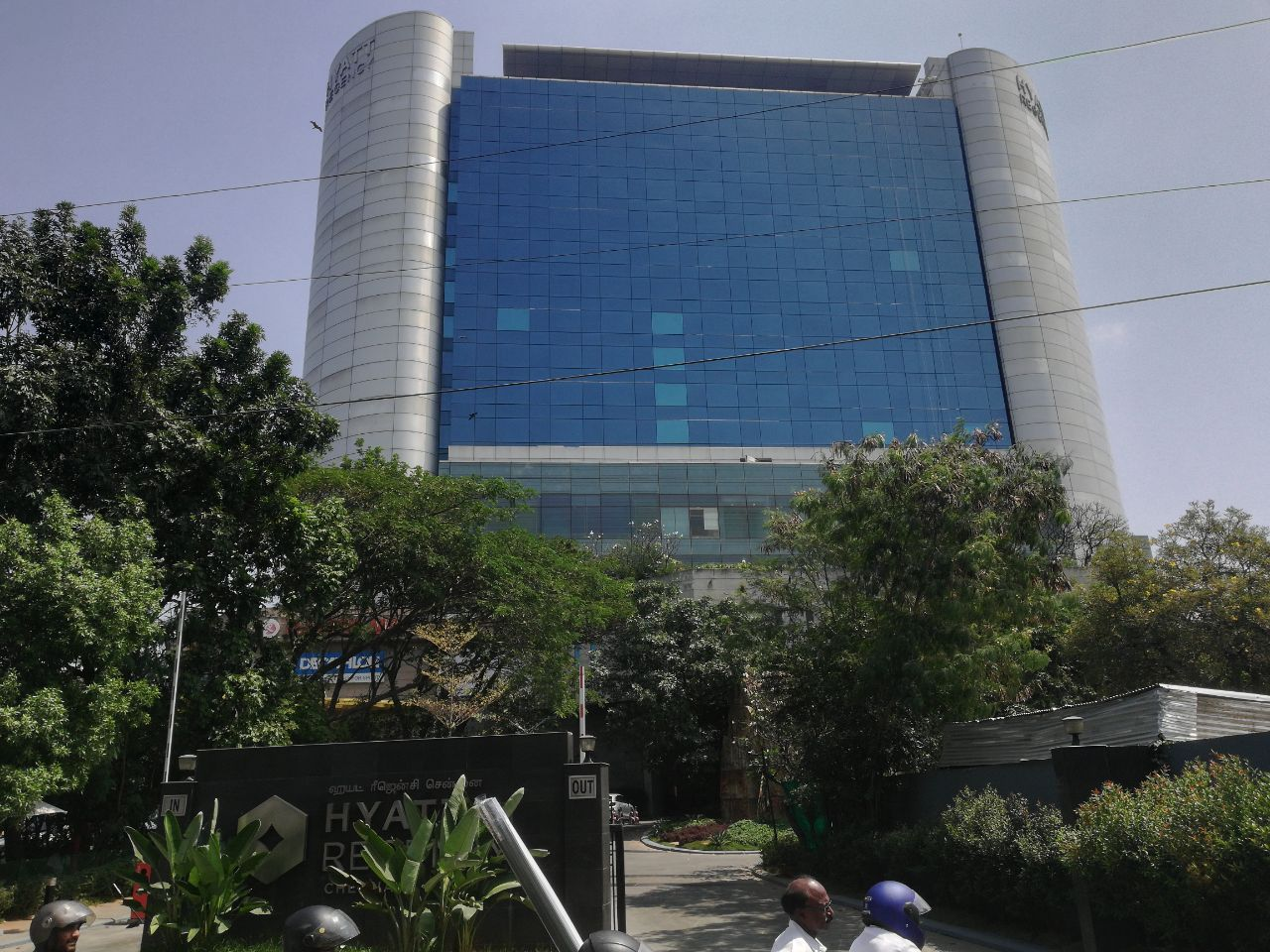
The hotel building as in February 2025

The hotel was the venue for the World Chess Championship 2013, held for the first time in India, from 9 to 28 November 2013.

The hotel conducts events such as Style Bazaar Exhibition, a lifestyle exhibition of fashion, decor, jewellery, festive edits and accessories.

== Awards ==
- In 2012, the hotel won the "Best International Hotel Marketing" award, by International Hotel Awards in London.
- In 2013, the hotel was awarded for the category New Hotel Construction and Design for India at Kuala Lumpur.

== Gallery ==
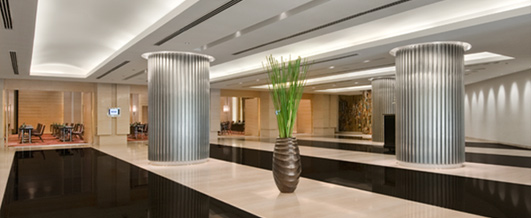
Ballroom pre-function area

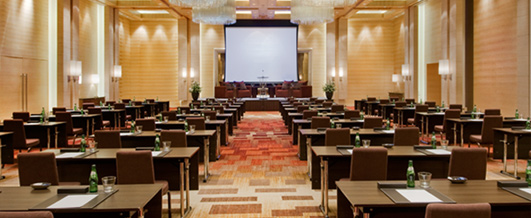
Ballroom in the hotel

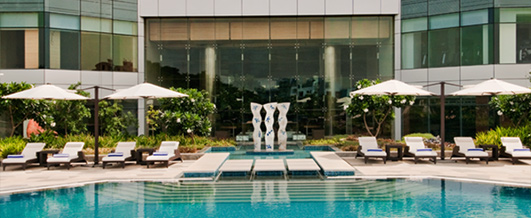
The pool at the hotel

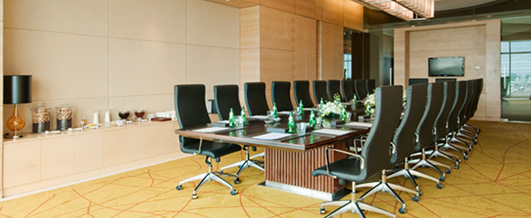
Meeting room at the hotel

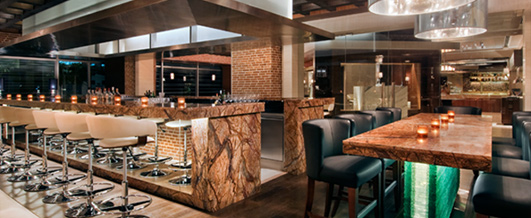
Lounge Bar at the hotel

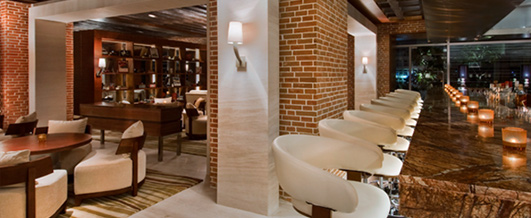
Inside the hotel

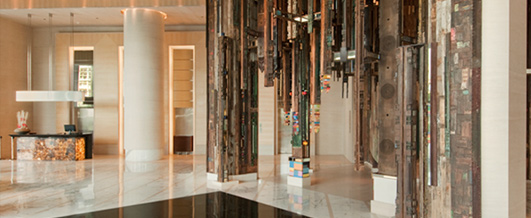
Art installations at the hotel

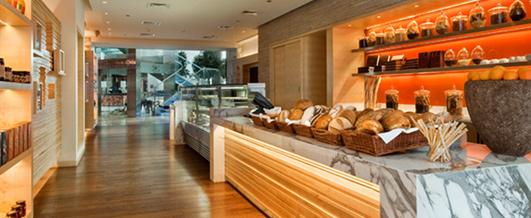
The Biscotti

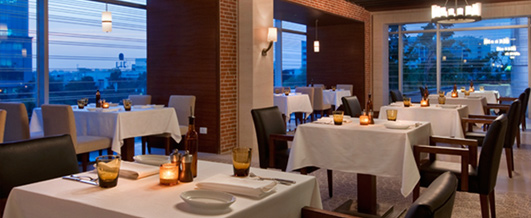
Focaccia, the southern Italian restaurant

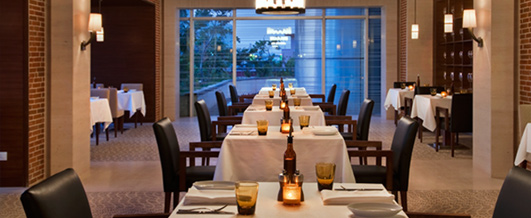
Another view of the Focaccia

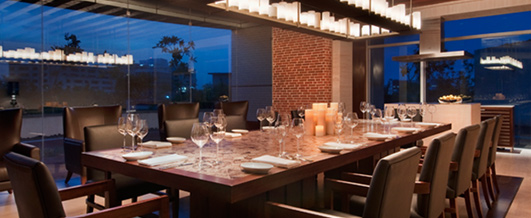
Private dining at the Focaccia restaurant

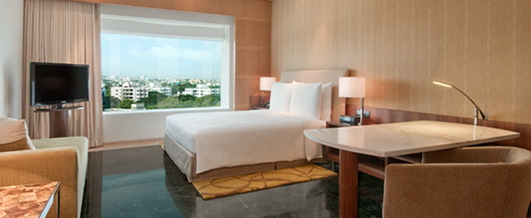
A standard guest room in the hotel

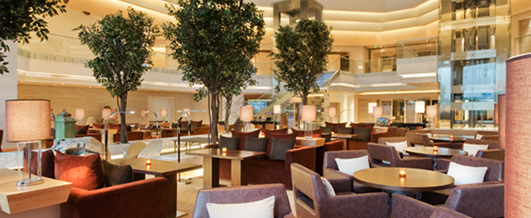
Lobby lounge at the hotel

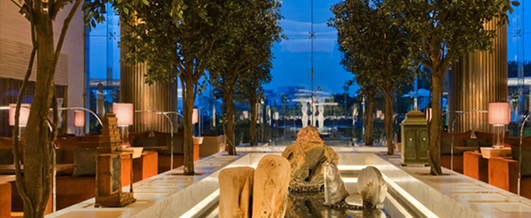
Another view of the lobby lounge

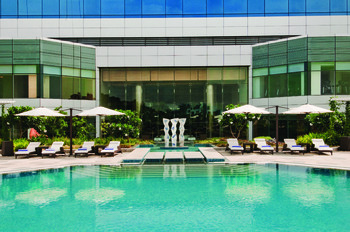
Front view of the swimming pool

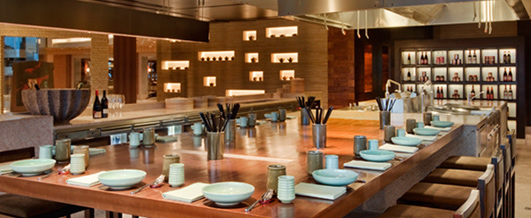
The Stix

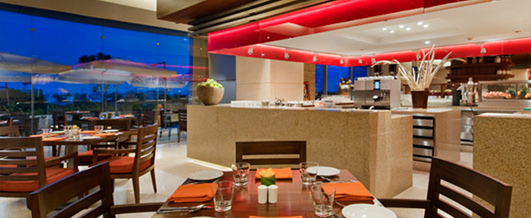
The Spice Haat

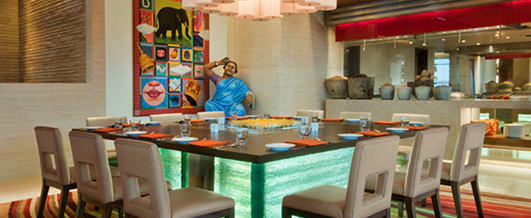
Another view of the Spice Haat

== See also ==
- List of hotels in Chennai
- List of tallest buildings in Chennai
