= Central Tower, Chennai =

Skyscraper in Chennai, India

General information
- Type: Commercial offices
- Architectural style: Modernism (RCC-framed construction)
- Location: Poonamallee High Road, Park Town, India, Poonamallee High Road, Chennai, Tamil Nadu 600 003, India
- Construction started: 2025; 1 year ago
- Completed: Under Construction
- Cost: ₹3,500 million
- Owner: Chennai Metro Rail Limited

Height
- Roof: 119 m (390 ft)

Technical details
- Floor count: 27

Design and construction
- Architect: C.R. Narayana Rao
- Developer: Chennai Metro Rail Limited

Central Tower or Central Square Tower is a 27-storied building under construction in Chennai, India, to serve as the central commercial complex in the Central Square area in the Park Town neighbourhood.

== History ==
The land on which the tower stands was previously used as staff quarters for Rajiv Gandhi Government General Hospital. The land was transferred to Chennai Metro Rail Limited (CMRL) in 2012, during the construction of first phase of Chennai Metro between Chennai Central and Koyambedu. Originally the tower was planned to be a 33-storey building, which was later scaled down to 27 stories. The foundation for the tower was laid in February 2025.

== Architecture ==
Although the Indo-Saracenic style of architecture has not been adopted as such, the tower will be designed to incorporate elements of that style of architecture with a glass façade. With the tower surrounded by heritage buildings such as the Chennai Central Railway Station, Victoria Public Hall, and the Ripon Building, the design is aimed to reflect the tone of those surrounding structures. With the bottom portion of the towers has been demarcated as a public space, Indo-Saracenic-style colonnades have been used as part of the design from the ground till the fifth floor. For the office space about the fifth floor, long columns and punched windows have been used for a monumentality effect. The tower lacks a dome on the top for the reason that it will not be perceived at this height. To compensate this, the middle portion of the tower will be elevated to provide a crown effect.

== Structure ==
The tower is built on a 3.5-acre site. Spread over 14,280 square metres, the 119-metre-high tower will have a mix of retail, office and business spaces. The complex will consist of four blocks, with the main block (Block A) featuring 27 floors. The lower floors (ground to 4th) will have retail and commercial outlets, including a multiplex, while floors 5 to 24 will have office spaces. While the 25th floor will house service facilities, the top two floors will be premium business and commercial spaces, including a 40-room rooftop hotel spanning an area of 6,403 square meters. It also includes a restaurant-cum-bar for 150 guests and a 40-seater multipurpose hall. The four basement levels will accommodate parking and other facilities. The tower will have a multiplex, office spaces, retail outlets, and a rooftop hotel, with the basement connected to the Chennai Central metro station and with links to the Chennai Central Suburban and Park Town MRTS stations by means of on-ground walkways.

The neighbourhood area contains predominantly black cotton soil, a clay-rich soil considered to present challenges for building construction. The pile of the building has been laid as deep as 25 to 30 meters.

== Parking ==
The building will have a huge underground parking space measuring 24,154 square meters capable of accommodating 586 cars and 1,652 two-wheelers. A basement multilevel parking facility in the main block provides space for 250 cars, with other blocks offering an additional 190 cars and 170 two-wheelers.

== Geotechnical challenges ==
The presence of black cotton soil in the zone posed major geotechnical challenges in the constructing of the Central Square Tower. The clay-rich soil tends to expand and contract with variations in moisture, reducing natural load-bearing stability. Deep pile foundations extending approximately 25 to 30 metres underground were constructed to overcome this, ensuring safe load distribution and long-term structural stability.

== See also ==
- List of tallest buildings in Chennai
- Architecture of Chennai
