= Padur =

Padur പാടൂര് Padoor
- Village
- Interactive map of Padur
- Coordinates: 10°39′N 76°28′E
- Country: India
- State: Kerala
- District: Palakkad

Languages
  - Official: Malayalam, English
- Time zone: UTC+5:30 (IST)
- PIN: 678543
- Telephone code: 04922
- Vehicle registration: KL-49
- Nearest city: Palghat
- Literacy: 99.9%
- Lok Sabha constituency: Alathur

Padur (or Padoor) (Malayam: പാടൂര്) is a village in Palakkad district, Kerala, India. The village is prominently known for its temple of Sree Panickanar, where a yearly festival called Padur Vela is celebrated and is well attended for Vela-Poorams in the Palakkad district.

== Location ==
Padur is a border village in the Palakkad district, situated between the Palakkad and Thrissur districts. Padur is locally governed under Kavasseri-II of the Alathur revenue taluk. It is approximately 5 square kilometres in area, with a population of nearly 5,000. Padur is situated 31 km from the Palakkad district headquarters, 8 km from Alathur, and 8 km from Pazhayannur.

== Geography ==
Padur is surrounded by rivers on its 3 sides. The river Gayathri forms the northern boundary, while the river Mangalam forms the southern boundary. In the west of the village, both rivers merge into the Bharatapuzha, the largest river in Kerala. Padur has thick greenery, including paddy fields, banana farms and coconut trees.

== Etymology ==
The name Padur (In Malayam, Padoor: പാടൂര്) is derived from the usage: "The land (oor: ഊര്) of Palakkad King (പാലക്കാട്‌ രാജാവ്)". This is why the Palakkad Vela-Pooram celebrations originate out of Padur.

== Temples ==
Padur Vela, typically celebrated on the 23rd or 24th of February each year, is the curtain raiser for Vela Poorams in Palakkad. The festival is celebrated as a birthday of Lord Sree Panickanar, an incarnation of Lord Ayyappa. The culture, beliefs, and prosperity of this village is bound to Sree Panickanar. This temple is one of the rarest of its kind, as the idol is formed on its own (swayam bhoo: സ്വയം ഭൂ). Besides this, there are around six other temples in the village: Lord Shiva, Lord Krishna, Karthiayani Kovil (of Goddess Parvathi), Sree Kurumba Kaavu (of an incarnated Goddess known as the daughter of Lord Shiva), several Mariamman Kavu (temples of a Hindu goddess), Venkatachalapathy Temple in East Village, and others. There is also a church and a mosque in the boundaries of the village.

== Demography ==
The majority of people in Padur follow Hinduism. However, there are people that practice other religions such as Christianity and Islam.

== Institutions ==
Padur has an Aided LP school that teaches grades one to five, totaling to educating about 5 generations of people over its 113 years of service. The village has both a primary health center and a veterinary hospital, a branch post office, a public library, and a number of sports clubs. One of which, Blue Star Sports club, has delivered many talented volleyball players to the state.

Bharat Sanchar Nigam Limited (BSNL) set up a telephone exchange in Padur.

== People and occupations ==
Padur is famous for astrologers, having a community of people who practice astrology professionally. These astrologers are called Panickers and use the title "Padur Panicker" (Kalarikkal) in their names.

The majority of Padur people hold occupations in agriculture, either as agriculturalists or as laborers. Few work in government services. Alternately, a modest number of people work in other states of India or abroad, in either public or private sectors. A number of entrepreneurs also live here.

A small-scale industrial estate is located in the village, where plastic products, power looms, soap, and brick manufacturing units run, providing additional job opportunities to the people of Padur and neighboring villages.

Irrespective of religion, caste, or colour, the people of Padur are very conservative and are closely knit together through traditions, culture, and relations. They believe that they are always looked after by Sree Panickanar, no matter which religion they belong to.

== Educational institutions ==
Padur has a lower primary school, located 0.5 km from the center of Padur.

== Transportation ==
Padur, being halfway between the Alathur and Pazhayannur state roads, is well connected via road to many places in the region, such as Palakkad, Alathur, Thrissur, Nemmara. Direct bus lines to Padur are available from Palakkad Municipal Bus Stand, Alathur New Bus Stand, and Thrissur Saktan Bus Stand. Also, connecting lines to the village are available from Palakkad Town Bus Stand and Palakkad Junction Railway Station. Bus services run from 5 am till 8:30 pm. The nearest railway stations from Padur are Palghat Junction and Thrissur Junction, while the nearest airports are Coimbatore International and Cochin International.

== Festivals ==
Padur Vela is celebrated in the month of February every year, bringing in crowds of people during the festival. The excitement of Vela starts one month before and people clean and paint their houses in preparation. People from the Padur village who reside abroad often return to attend the festival. This festival features lot of fireworks, elephant processions, and other cultural events.

Apart from Padur Vela, other festivals are celebrated annually, like Karthika Vilakku in West Village and Manadalavilakku and Brahmotsavam in East Village. There are two Mariamman Temples in Padur where Mariamman Vilakku is celebrated every year.
