= Navalur =

Navalur, Chennai
- suburb of Chennai
- Location in Tamil Nadu Location in India
- Coordinates: 12.835°N 80.20°E
- Country: India
- State: Tamil Nadu
- District: Chengalpattu
- Metro: Chennai
- Talukas: Thiruporur

Government
  - Body: Thiruporur BDO

Area
  - Total: 5 km^{2} (1.9 sq mi)

Population
  - Total: 7,000 (approx.)
  - Density: 1,400/km^{2} (3,600/sq mi)

Languages
  - Official: Tamil
- Time zone: UTC+5:30 (IST)
- PIN: 600130
- Vidhan Sabha constituency: Thiruporur

Navalur is a south suburb of Chennai, India and located just 5 km from Sholinganalur junction along Old Mahabalipuram Road. Navalur is located between Sholinganallur and Kelambakkam and comes under Thiruporur taluk of Chengalpattu district. This area was once a village (around 2010) but with the advent of IT Companies and the rapid development of the Old Mahabalipuram Road (New Mount road of Chennai), it has become a bustling and most demanded location in Chennai. Proximity to employment opportunities, good asset appreciation, outstanding road Infrastructure, proximity to beaches at ECR and other entertainment venues continues to attract more residents to this suburb.

The government is constructing Metro Train-Phase 2 along this route from Madhavaram to Siruseri IT park. Deadline to be operational for this Corridor-3 by 2024. Once Metro train is operational, it will be beneficial for overall development in OMR road.

== Schools ==
- Hiranandani Upscale School
- Mount Litera Zee School
- Velammal NewGen School
- KC High IGCSE Board Cambridge International School
