= Economy of Chennai =

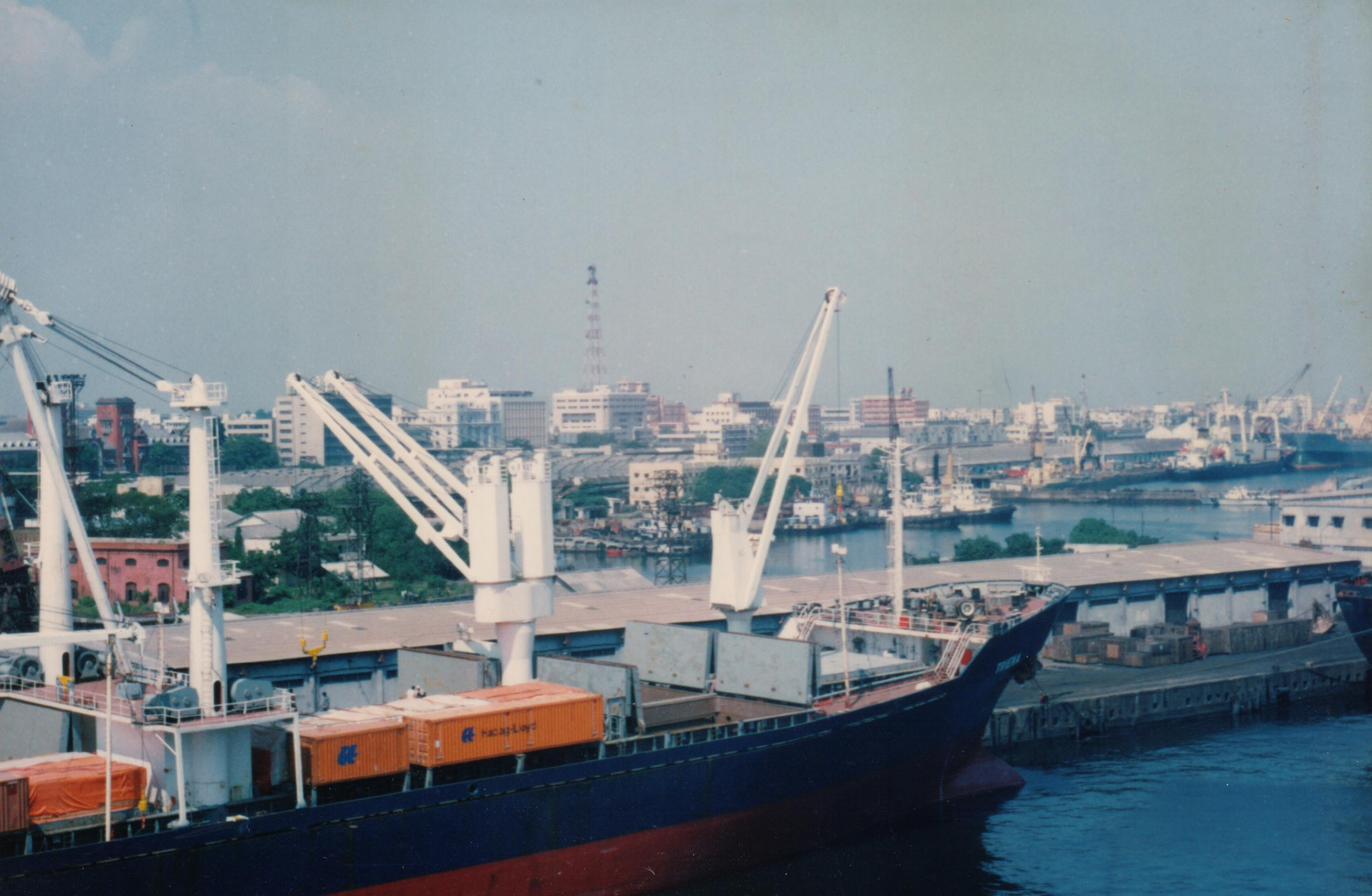
The Chennai Port, one of the biggest in South Asia

Chennai, formerly known as Madras, is the capital city of the Indian state of Tamil Nadu. As of 2023-24 the Nominal GDP of the Chennai metropolitan area is ₹851,246 crore (US$103.06 billion).

Chennai has an economic base anchored by the automobile, software services, medical tourism, hardware manufacturing and financial services sectors with which it contributes to around 31.66% of Economy of Tamil Nadu. Other important industries include petrochemicals, textiles, apparels. The Chennai Port and Ennore Port contribute greatly to its importance.

Chennai was recently rated as having the highest quality of life among Indian cities ahead of the other three metros Mumbai, Delhi, Kolkata, based on the "Location Ranking Survey" conducted by ECA International. Chennai has improved its global ranking to 138 in 2006–07 from 179 in 2002–03. It is now ranked at 26th position in Asia in terms of livability, up from 31st rank in 2002–03. According to a 2007 worldwide quality of life survey done by Mercer, Chennai received the second highest rating in India, with New Delhi scoring the highest, and came in at a relatively low 157th worldwide. The reason was attributed to poor health and sanitation, and the increasing air pollution. It has the distinction of being called as the Detroit of Asia, due to its large manufacturing industry.

As of 2012, the city has about 34,260 identified companies in its 15 zones. Of these, 5,196 companies has a paid-up capital of over ₹ 5 million, about 16,459 companies are in the paid up capital range of ₹ 100,000 to ₹ 200,000, and 2,304 companies have a paid-up capital of less than ₹ 100,000.

== Software and software services ==
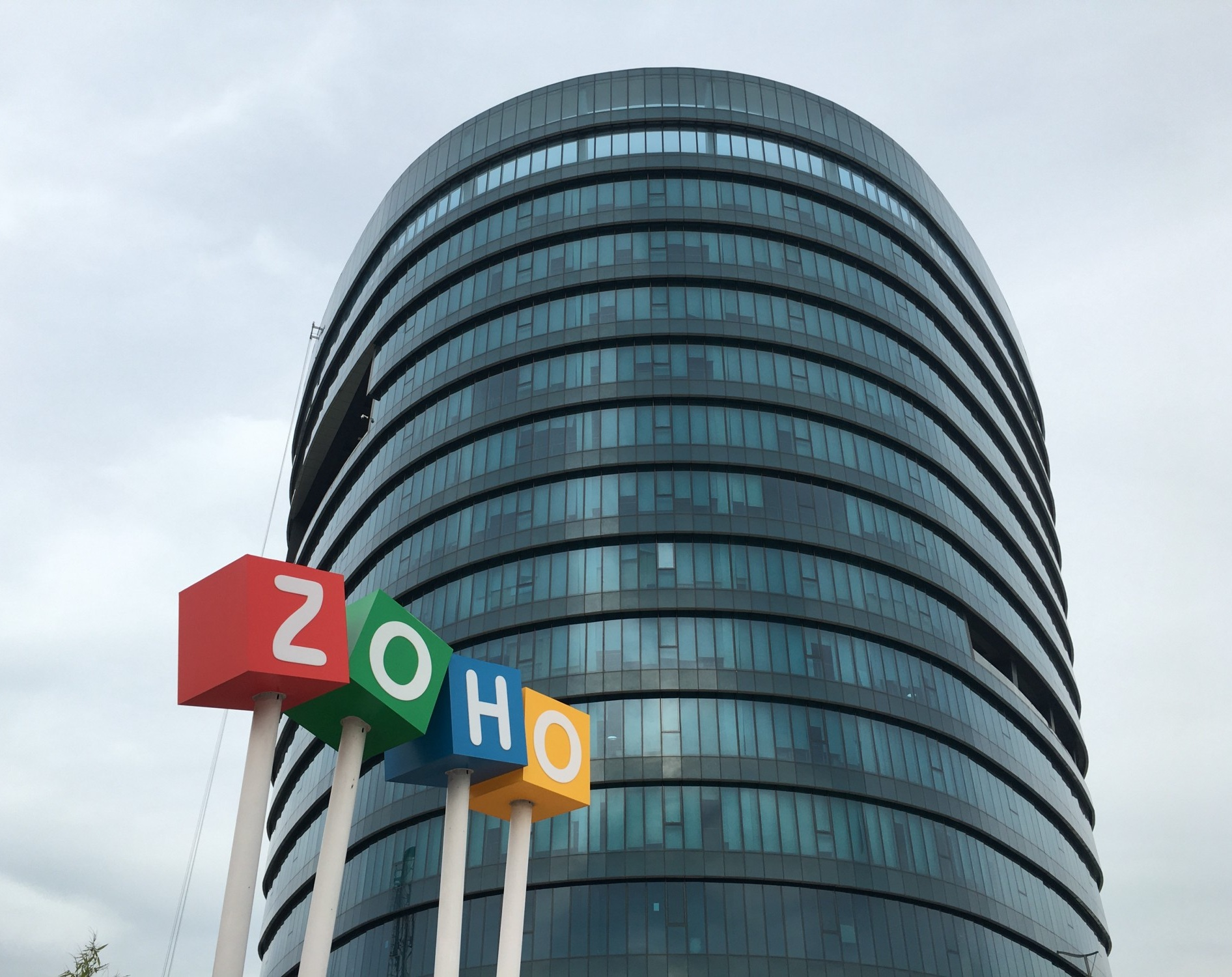
Zoho headquarters in Chennai

Since the late 1990s, software development and business process outsourcing and more recently electronics manufacturing have emerged as major drivers of the city's economic growth. Chennai has been rated as the most attractive Indian city for offshoring services according to A T Kearney's Indian City Services Attractiveness Index 2005. Major software and software services companies including Altran, Accenture, Cognizant, Capgemini, DXC Technology, SAP SE, Oracle Corporation, Cisco Systems, HCL Technologies, Hewlett Packard Enterprise, IBM, CGI Inc., Infosys, Sopra Steria, Symantec, Tata Consultancy Services, Verizon, Wipro, Virtusa, UST Global, Atos, Dassault Systèmes, Fujitsu, NTT DATA, LTI, Honeywell, VMware, Intel, Amazon.com, Inc., Tech Mahindra, Fiserv, Adobe Systems, AT&T, Philips, AstraZeneca, Wolters Kluwer, TransUnion, Ernst & Young, L&T Technology Services, Mindtree, Shell Business Operations, Athenahealth, Ford Global Technology & Business Center, Ramco Systems, Deloitte, Microsoft, Temenos, Synechron, KPMG, PayPal have development centres in the city. A major reason for the growth of the Software industry are the top engineering colleges in Tamil Nadu, of which Chennai is a major contributor, have been a major recruiting hub for the IT firms. According to estimates, these engineering colleges and universities consistently generate about 50 per cent of the human resource requirements for the IT and ITES industry that was being sourced from the state, particularly from Chennai. The city is now the second largest exporter of IT and IT enabled Services in the country behind Bangalore. The IT Corridor, on Old Mahabalipuram Road in the southeast of the city houses several technology parks, and, when completed, will provide employment to close to 300,000 people. Besides the existing Tidel Park, two more Tidel Parks are on the anvil in the IT corridor. One is under construction at the Siruseri IT Special Economic Zone ("SEZ") and the other one is being planned at the current location of MGR Film City which is just before the existing Tidel Park, in Taramani on the IT Corridor. A number of SEZ have emerged in and around Chennai. The Mahindra World City, New Chennai, a Special Economic Zone (SEZ) with one of the world's largest high technology business zones, is currently under construction in the outskirts of Chennai. It also includes the World's largest IT Park by Infosys.

== Electronics hardware ==
In recent years, Chennai has emerged as an electronic manufacturing hub of South Asia with multinational corporations like Dell, Motorola, Cisco, Samsung, Siemens, Ericsson, Emerson Electric, ABB and Flex setting up Electronics / Hardware manufacturing plants, particularly in the Sriperumbudur electronics SEZ. accounting for the sector alone has created investments worth $3.5bn in Chennai. Chennai is currently the largest electronics hardware exporter in India, accounting for 45% of the total exports in 2010–11. Ericsson, Alcatel, Atmel, Texas Instruments, Foxconn, Robert Bosch GmbH, Microchip Technology, Xerox, Nokia Corporation, Siemens have research and development facilities in the city. Semiconductor companies like SPEL and Tessolve have announced plans to set up or expand manufacturing and R&D centers in the city. Companies like Flex, Motorola, Ericsson, Samsung, Cisco and Dell have chosen Chennai as their South Asian manufacturing hub. Chinese smartphone maker Huawei plans to their manufacturing unit in Chennai. Products manufactured include circuit boards and cellular phone handsets. In 2022, Reliance Industries and Sanmina-SCI formed a joint venture focused on electronics manufacturing in Chennai. Nokia Networks has decided to build a manufacturing plant for wireless network equipment in Chennai.

== Engineering procurement and construction ==
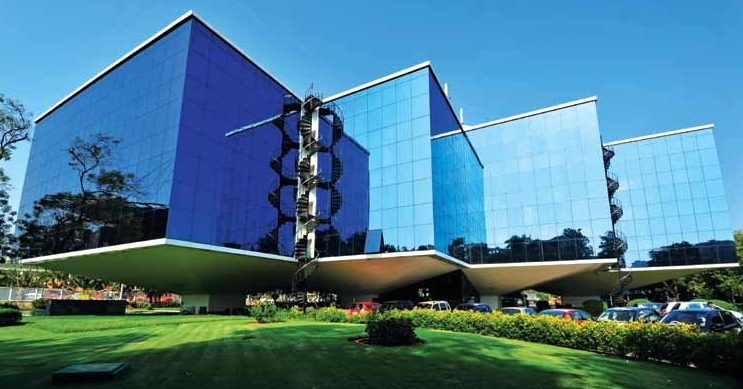
Headquarters of L&T Construction in Manapakkam, Chennai

Chennai serves as the headquarters for some of Asia's largest engineering procurement and construction companies like VA Tech Wabag, BGR Energy, L&T Construction, L&T Infrastructure Engineering, FLSmidth, Ramboll, Hyundai Engineering & Construction, Shriram EPC. Chennai has emerged as an Offshore Engineering hub due to the presence of Offshore Technology and Renewable Energy research institutions like Indian Institute of Technology Madras, National Institute of Ocean Technology, Center of Wind Energy Technology (C-WET), Indian Maritime University, Tamil Nadu Energy Development Authority (TEDA), Anna University School of Energy, etc. Big EPC and Energy companies have set up their Engineering centres which include Wood Group, KBR, Técnicas Reunidas, Bechtel, McDermott International, Saipem, Worley, Technip, Mott MacDonald, Petrofac, Siemens Gamesa and others. Austrian company "Austrian Energy and Environment" have also a design office here besides local giant Larsen & Toubro ECC.

== Automobiles ==
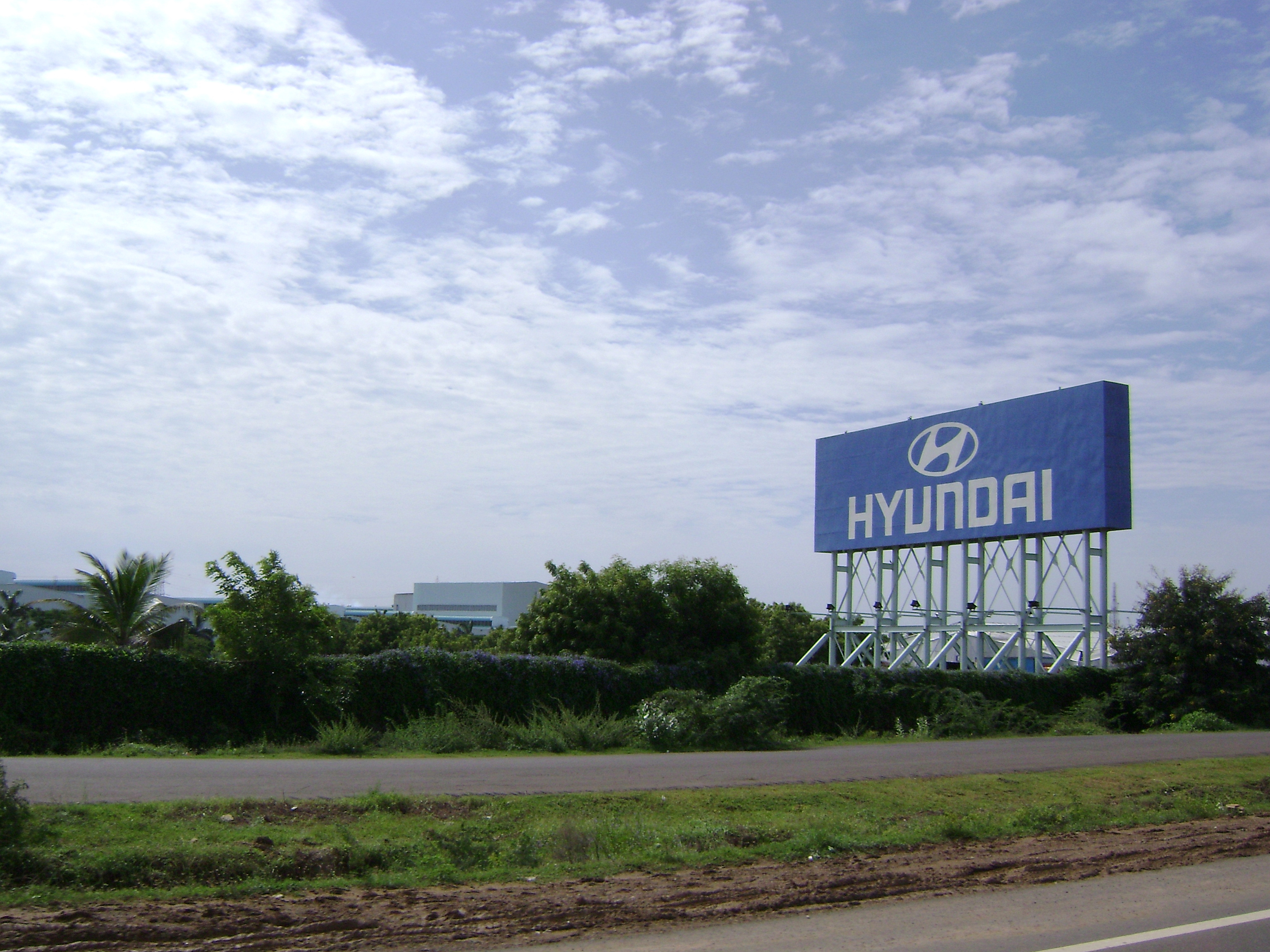
Hyundai's manufacturing plant at Irungattukottai near Sriperumbudur, Kanchipuram district

The city accounts for 60 per cent of India's automotive exports, which leads it to be called as 'The Detroit of Asia'. Chennai has a market share of around 30% of India's automobile industry and 35% of its auto components industry. A large number of the automotive companies including several global automotive companies such as BMW, Hyundai, Ford, Citroën, Nissan, Renault, Mitsubishi, TVS Motor Company, Ashok Leyland, Caterpillar, Royal Enfield, TI Cycles, TAFE, Dunlop, MRF, Daimler, Yamaha, Brembo, Michelin, Bridgestone, JK Tyres, Apollo Tyres and CEAT have manufacturing plants in and around Chennai. Mahindra & Mahindra have a manufacturing plant under construction in Cheyyar, which is about 100 km from Chennai. The city is a major centre for the auto ancillary industry as well such as Sundaram Clayton and Rane. Hyundai is in the process of setting up engine plant in the city. Ford is planning to invest $500 million in Chennai plant. Several Petrochemical companies like Chennai Petro Chemicals Limited (Manali Refinery), Manali Petrochemicals, Petro Araldite and Orchid Pharmaceuticals are situated in the outskirts of Chennai. Chennai will turn out close to 1.5 million vehicles a year, more than any one U.S. state made last year. The city is also home to some of the world's largest Automotive Research & Development facilities in the world, which include Nissan, Hyundai, BMW, Caterpillar and Daimler. It houses the world's second largest Research Valley—The Mahindra Research Valley. Schwing Stetter is building a plant in Chennai

The Heavy Vehicles Factory, Avadi produces military vehicles, including India's main battle tank: Arjun MBT. The Railway Coach building factory of the Indian Railways, the Integral Coach Factory manufactures railway coaches and other rolling stock.

== Port ==
Chennai is also a major port city, that's why it is heavily industrialized in a developed way. There are two ports in Chennai - Chennai Port and Ennore Port. Chennai Port was formerly known as Madras Port. This port started establishing from the 1800s itself. It is the second largest major port in India after Mumbai's Nhava Sheva. The Chennai Port contains a container and cruise terminal. Kamarajar Port was formerly known as Ennore Port. It is located at Ennore.

== Banking and finance ==
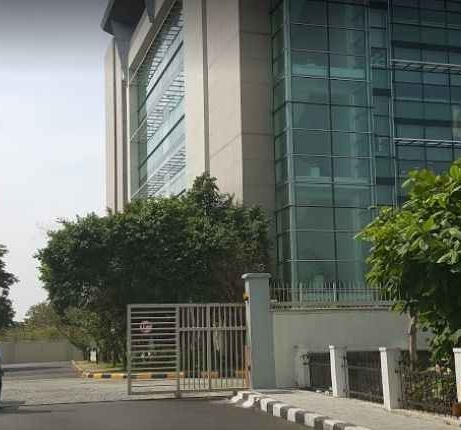
World Bank office in Chennai

The first modern bank in Chennai, Bank of Madras was started by the British in 1843. It was followed by the opening of other banks namely - Arbuthnot & Co, Bank of Chettinad, Bank of Madura, that were later merged under the supervision of RBI. The city serves as the headquarters for the second most number of banks and financial institutions in India, only next to the financial Capital Mumbai. The city has been tagged as the Banking Capital of India, for its vibrant banking culture and trading. The city has emerged as an important center for banking and finance in the World Market. Chennai boasts a transaction volume which serves 1.5 billion people across the World through Back office operation. At present, it is home to four large national level commercial banks and many regional and state level co-operative banks. Several large financial companies and insurance companies are headquartered in Chennai. Prominent financial institutions, including the World Bank, Standard Chartered Bank, ABN AMRO, Bank of America, The Royal Bank of Scotland, Goldman Sachs, BNY Mellon, Barclays, JPMorgan Chase, HSBC, Société Générale, Wells Fargo, Deutsche Bank, ING Group, Allianz, Sumitomo Mitsui Banking Corporation, The Bank of Tokyo-Mitsubishi UFJ, Abu Dhabi Commercial Bank, Asian Development Bank, Credit Suisse, BNP Paribas Fortis, DBS Bank, ANZ, and Citibank have back office and Development Center operations in the city. The city serves as a major back-up centre for operations of many banks and financial companies of the world.

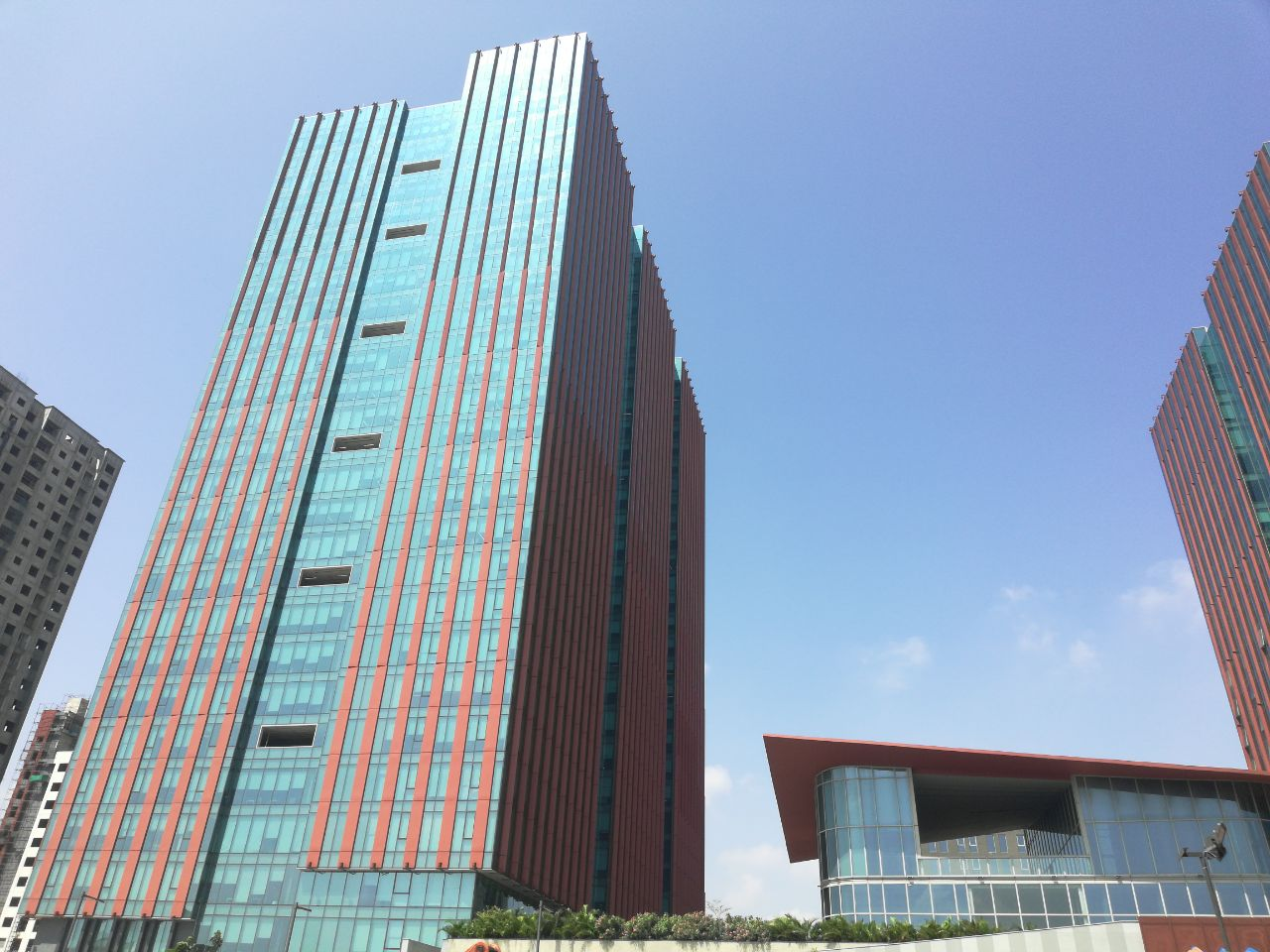
World Trade Center buildings

The banking sector in Chennai is broadly classified into scheduled banks, non-scheduled banks and Foreign banks. All banks included in the Second Schedule to the Reserve Bank of India Act, 1934 are Scheduled Banks. These banks comprise Scheduled Commercial Banks and Scheduled Co-operative Banks. Scheduled Co-operative Banks consist of Scheduled State Co-operative Banks and Scheduled Urban Cooperative Banks. Scheduled Commercial Banks in Chennai are categorised into five different groups according to their ownership and/or nature of operation:

- Nationalised banks
- Private sector banks
- Foreign banks
- Regional rural banks
- Small finance banks

The following are the list of banks based in Chennai.

Bank name	Established	Headquarter	Branches	Revenues	Total assets	Ref/notes
Indian Bank	1907	Chennai	2,836	₹43,414.34 crore (US$4.5 billion)	₹394,771 crore (US$41 billion)	
Indian Overseas Bank	1937	Chennai	3,350	₹43,120.09 crore (US$4.5 billion)	₹374,436.76 crore (US$39 billion)	
Lakshmi Vilas Bank	1926	Chennai	565	₹2,568.4 crore (US$270 million)	₹56,287.92 crore (US$5.8 billion)	
Equitas Small Finance Bank	2007	Chennai	412	₹1,908.77 crore (US$200 million)	₹23,086.5 crore (US$2.4 billion)	
Repco Bank	1969	Chennai	153	₹984.5 crore (US$100 million)	₹16,515 crore (US$1.7 billion)	
TNSC Bank	1905	Chennai	100+	₹485.7 crore (US$50 million)	₹11,216 crore (US$1.2 billion)	

The World Trade Center in the city became functional in 2021.

== Medical tourism ==
Chennai leads in the health care sector and is considered the Health Capital of India. Home to some of India's best health care institutions such as Apollo Hospitals, MIOT Hospitals, Sankara Nethralaya, Sri Ramachandra Medical Center, Fortis Healthcare, Sir Ivan Stedeford Hospital, Dr. Mehtas Hospitals, Sundaram Medical Foundation, Madras Medical Mission, Frontier Lifeline & K.M. Cherian Heart Foundation, Hindu Mission Hospital, Regional Institute of Ophthalmology and Government Ophthalmic Hospital, Chennai, Chettinad Health City and Adyar Cancer Institute, Chennai is a preferred destination for medical tourists from across the globe. Some of the treatments sought after by the tourists include heart surgery, neurological problems, cancer, plastic surgery and orthopaedic procedures. Chennai attracts about 45% of all health tourists arriving in India from abroad in addition to 30% to 40% of domestic tourists.

== Petrochemicals and textiles ==
There is also an oil refinery in Manali called as Manali Refinery which is controlled by the CPCL. Other major manufacturing facilities range from small scale manufacturing to large scale heavy industrial manufacturing, petrochemicals and auto ancillary plants. Chennai is a textile industry hub with a large number of apparel industries located in the Ambattur-Padi industrial zone in the northern suburbs of the city. The city also has a large leather apparel and accessory industry. SEZ's for apparel manufacture and footwear are under construction in the southern suburbs of the city. Chennai is the cradle for world-renowned Madras shirts.

== Traditional arts ==
Chennai, hosts the Madras Music Season, during the months of December and January, annually. It is the capital of the Carnatic Music and Bharatanatyam scene in India, and there are many venues in which artists perform throughout the city. There is also a large theatre scene and contemporary visual art scene in the city.

== Entertainment industry ==
The city is home to the Tamil entertainment (motion pictures, television, and recorded music) industry which is one of the largest of top 3 film industries in India. Because the film industry is largely centered on a local area called Kodambakkam, the Tamil film industry is popularly referred to as Kollywood.

The Madras Players is the oldest theatre group in India.

== Aerospace industry ==
Chennai Aero Park, a proposed aerospace design, manufacturing and maintenance park is set to become the largest integrated aerospace ecosystem in the world. The project is a pioneering initiative to mark India's entry into the global aerospace industry. The aero park will enable global players to design, manufacture and maintain all types of aircraft for both civilian and defense needs. It is to be established as a Public-Private Partnership (PPP) entity.

The city is home to Ashok Leyland Defence Systems, Rane and 56 more aircraft component manufactures. It also has the largest Aerospace Research & Development facility in India, which is controlled by Mahindra Aerospace.

== See also ==
- List of districts in Tamil Nadu by Human Development Index
- Economy of Tamil Nadu
- Economy of India
