= Economy of Tamil Nadu =

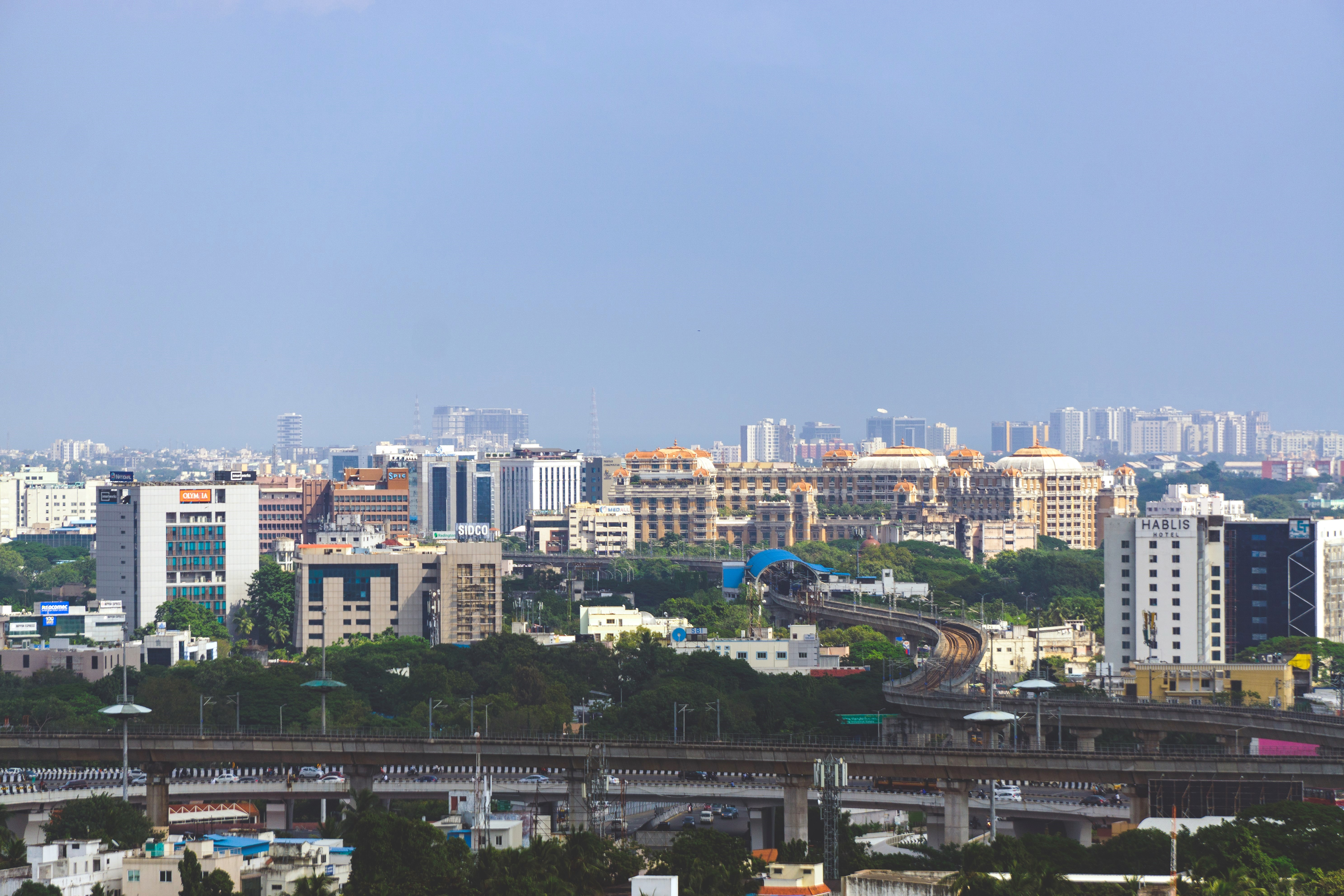
- Chennai, the capital of Tamil Nadu
- Currency: Indian rupee (INR, ₹)
- Fiscal year: 1 April – 31 March
- Country group: Developing/Emerging; Upper-middle income economy

Statistics
- Population: ▲77,317,000
- GDP: ▲₹40.67 trillion (US$420 billion) (2026-27 est.) ▲$2.00 trillion (PPP; 2026-27 est.)
- GDP rank: 2nd
- GDP growth: 14% (2026-27 est.)
- GDP per capita: ▲₹455,650 (US$4,700) (nominal; 2026-27 est.) ▲$25,779 (PPP; 2026-27 est.)
- GDP per capita rank: 4th
- GDP by sector: Services: 54% (2020–21); Industry: 33% Agriculture: 13%
- Population below national poverty line: 5.20% (2025 Based On Report)
- Human Development Index: ▲0.787 high (2025) (15th)
- Unemployment: ▼3.5% (Feb 2026)

External
- Exports: ₹12.75 lakh crore (US$130 billion) (2026–27)
- Export goods: Automobiles, mobile phones, software, missile defense, electronics, telecommunications equipment, armaments, locomotives, ships, machinery, steel, aluminium, transportation equipment, tyres, textiles, footwear, leather, chemicals, cement, plastics, toys, food processing, seafood, vegetables, fruits, tea and coffee
- Main export partners: Australia
- FDI stock: ₹89,575 crore (US$9.3 billion) (2026–27)

Public finance
- Government debt: 26.29% of GSDP (2022–23 est.)
- Budget balance: ₹−107,517 crore (US$−11 billion) (3.63% of GSDP) (2022–23 est.)
- Revenue: ₹3.00 lakh crore (US$31 billion) (2026–27 est.)
- Spending: ₹10 lakh crore (US$100 billion) (2026–27 est.)
- All values, unless otherwise stated, are in US dollars.

Tamil Nadu has the second-largest economy of any state in India. The state is also the most industrialised in the country. The state is 48.40% urbanised, accounting for around 9.26% of the urban population in the country, while the state as a whole accounted for 5.96% of India's total population in the 2011 census. Services contribute to 54% of the gross domestic product of the state, followed by manufacturing at 33% and agriculture at 13%.

Government is the major investor in the state, with 52% of total investments, followed by private Indian investors at 29.9% and foreign private investors at 14.9%. It has been ranked as the most economically free state in India by the Economic Freedom Rankings for the States of India.

== Political economy of Tamil Nadu ==
Tamil Nadu’s political economy reflects a combination of early post-independence industrialisation, national planning priorities, and subsequent state-level policy choices. Since the 1967 legislative assembly election, the state has been governed predominantly by regional Dravidian parties, notably the Dravida Munnetra Kazhagam (DMK) and the All India Anna Dravida Munnetra Kazhagam (AIADMK), which have alternated in power for most of the period. Scholars have argued that this political continuity influenced state policy priorities, particularly in the areas of social welfare, affirmative action, and public provisioning.

=== Early industrialisation and national planning context ===
Industrial development in Tamil Nadu began prior to the rise of Dravidian parties and was shaped significantly by post-independence national economic planning. During the 1950s and early 1960s, under Chief Minister K. Kamaraj, the Madras state government expanded irrigation, educational infrastructure, and industrial development initiatives. These developments occurred within the framework of India’s Second and Third Five Year Plans, which emphasised heavy industry and import substitution.

Several major public sector industrial and energy projects were established in the state during this period or shortly thereafter, including the Integral Coach Factory in Perambur (established 1955), the Neyveli Lignite Corporation, and defence manufacturing facilities at Avadi.

R. Venkataraman, who served as Industries Minister in the Madras state government during the late 1950s, has been associated with the promotion of industrial estates and the facilitation of both central public sector undertakings and private investment. The Guindy Industrial Estate was among the early planned industrial estates developed in this period.

Alongside public sector investment, established regional industrial groups such as the TVS Group and the Murugappa Group expanded manufacturing operations in automobiles, engineering, and related sectors.

Comparative studies of Indian states have noted that several southern states, including Tamil Nadu, Karnataka, and Andhra Pradesh, benefited from relatively early investments in education, infrastructure, and administrative capacity, which supported industrial diversification over time.

=== Social structure and political mobilisation ===
Historians of South India have documented that during the colonial period, Brahmins were disproportionately represented in certain administrative positions within the Madras Presidency. This pattern has been cited in scholarship as one of the factors contributing to the rise of non-Brahmin political mobilisation in the early twentieth century.

=== Welfare and human development ===
Tamil Nadu has been discussed in development literature as a state with relatively strong human development indicators compared to the all-India average. The state expanded access to primary education in the decades following independence and later invested in secondary and tertiary education.

According to the All India Survey on Higher Education, Tamil Nadu has reported one of the highest gross enrolment ratios in higher education among Indian states in recent years. Based on the Tendulkar methodology for 2011–12, Tamil Nadu’s poverty rate was among the lowest among major Indian states.

=== Industrial structure and economic scale ===
Over time, Tamil Nadu developed a diversified industrial base including automobiles, textiles, leather goods, electronics, information technology, and heavy engineering. The Chennai region emerged as a major automobile manufacturing hub in India.

Tamil Nadu is consistently ranked among the largest state economies in India by Gross State Domestic Product at current prices, according to data published by the Reserve Bank of India.

=== National policy influences and contemporary developments ===
Scholars have noted that industrial development across Indian states has also been shaped by national level policy decisions. The Freight Equalisation Policy, introduced in 1952, sought to reduce regional disparities in access to raw materials by equalising freight costs for certain commodities, and has been discussed in literature examining the regional distribution of industry in post-independence India.

In recent years, Government of India initiatives such as the Production Linked Incentive (PLI) schemes have sought to promote domestic manufacturing in sectors including electronics, automobiles, pharmaceuticals, and textiles. Tamil Nadu has been among the states attracting investment under these schemes, particularly in electronics and automobile manufacturing.

== Macroeconomic trend ==
=== Growth during the late 90s ===
Real GSDP per capita grew 96 per cent during 1980–95.

GSDP at market prices
Year	Gross State Domestic Product (₹ lakhs)	₹ per USD	GSDP Deflator (index 2011 = 100)	Per Capita Income (as % of USA)
1980	116,119	7.89	11.454	2.43
1981	139,555	8.68	12.456	2.38
1982	144,053	9.48	13.422	2.15
1983	167,345	10.10	14.709	2.14
1984	196,256	11.35	15.370	2.00
1985	224,851	12.33	16.820	1.95
1986	251,650	12.60	18.946	2.01
1987	297,345	12.94	21.040	2.17
1988	333,354	13.90	21.845	2.09
1989	389,898	16.21	23.894	1.94
1990	450,321	17.49	25.713	1.96
1991	531,048	22.71	29.452	1.72
1992	618,025	28.16	32.539	1.53
1993	745,165	31.29	36.111	1.58
1994	889,112	31.39	38.275	1.77

=== Capitalist boom ===
Real GSDP per capita grew 188 per cent during 1995–2014.

GSDP at market prices
Year	Gross State Domestic Product (₹ lakhs)	₹ per USD	GSDP Deflator (index 2011 = 100)	Per Capita Income (as % of USA)
1995	1,012,627	32.42	42.137	1.86
1996	1,155,473	35.51	45.815	1.84
1997	1,340,803	36.37	49.133	1.96
1998	1,530,613	41.36	53.557	1.87
1999	1,635,546	43.13	53.932	1.80
2000	1,789,259	45.00	55.728	1.77
2001	1,814,428	47.22	57.410	1.66
2002	1,927,711	48.63	59.943	1.65
2003	2,137,552	46.59	62.713	1.81
2004	2,466,685	45.26	64.934	2.00
2005	2,904,036	44.00	67.084	2.26
2006	3,497,531	45.19	70.127	2.49
2007	3,951,361	41.18	74.650	2.93
2008	4,520,346	43.39	80.984	3.10
2009	5,403,351	48.33	87.347	3.38
2010	6,587,827	45.65	94.144	4.17
2011	7,514,860	46.58	100.000	4.39
2012	8,548,250	53.37	107.956	4.24
2013	9,685,300	58.51	113.680	4.19

=== Economic boom ===
Real GSDP per capita grew 13 per cent during 2014–21.

GSDP at market prices
Year	Gross State Domestic Product (000,000 rupees)	₹ per USD	GSDP Deflator (index 2011 = 100)	Per Capita Income (as % of USA)
2014	10,726,780	61.00	119.998	4.24
2015	11,765,000	64.11	121.594	4.24
2016	13,026,390	67.20	125.645	4.32
2017	14,650,510	65.12	130.135	4.77
2018	16,302,090	68.40	135.324	4.75
2019	17,431,440	70.42	140.143	4.69
2020	18,082,390	74.10	145.171	4.68
2021	20,654,360	73.92	153.552	4.81

== Sectors ==
=== Agriculture and livestock ===
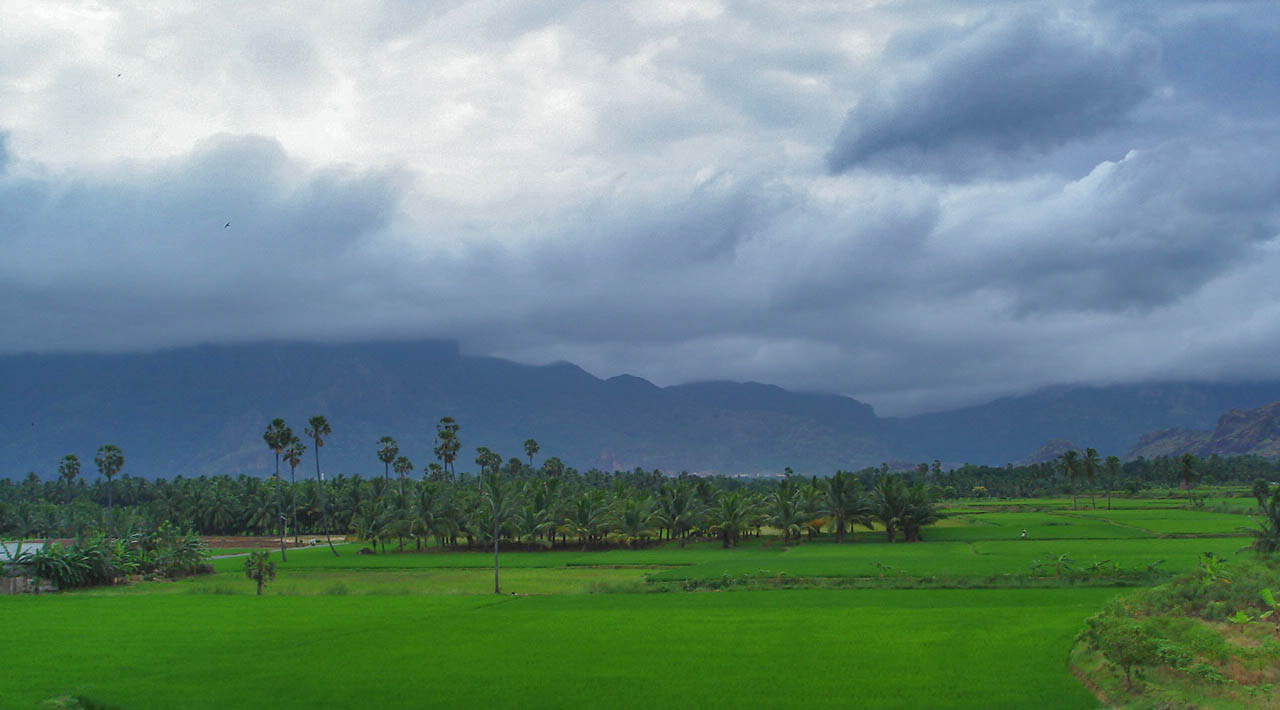
Paddy fields in Kanyakumari District

Tamil Nadu has historically been an agricultural state, while its advances in other fields transformed the state into being an industrialized and innovation based economy, leading to competition for land and its resources. Agriculture is heavily dependent on the river water and monsoon rains. The perennial rivers are Palar, Cheyyar, Ponnaiyar, Kaveri, Meyar, Bhavani, Amaravathi, Vaigai, Chittar and Tamaraparani. Non-perennial rivers include the Vellar, Noyyal, Suruli, Siruvani, Gundar, Vaipar, Valparai and Varshali. Tamil Nadu ranks first in Cloves production with 1,059 metric tons in the year 2022. Tamil Nadu is the highest producer of bananas and coconuts in the whole country. It is also a leading state in production of other crops such as sugarcane, cotton, kambu, maize, rye, groundnut and oil seeds. At present, Tamil Nadu is India's 4th largest producer of rice behind West Bengal, Uttar Pradesh and Punjab Tamil Nadu is the home to Dr. M. S. Swaminathan, known as the "father of the Green Revolution" in India. The state is one of the major producers of turmeric in India.

Given below is a table of 2015–16 national output share of select agricultural crops and allied segments in Tamil Nadu based on 2011 prices

Segment	National Share %
Drumstick	98.0
Cloves	79.4
Tapioca	44.4
Coconut	29.1
Tamarind	25.3
Banana	19.4
Gooseberry	18
Ragi	17.8
Horsegram	17.5
Sapota	17.4
Floriculture	16.5
Turmeric	14.6
Urd	14.7
Groundnut	14.2
Cucumber	12.6
Maize	12.3
Egg	12.2
Carrot	12.1
Marine fish	11.8
Gur	11.6
Water melon	11.4
Jackfruit	10.9
Jowar	10.6
Tea	8.5
Cocoa	8.2
Moong	7.9
Oilseed	7.7
Papaya	7.4
Meat	7.5
Paddy	6.9
Bean	6.7
Fruit and vegetable	6.3
Sugarcane	6.1
Mango	5.8
Bitter gourd	5.6
Pear	5.3
Sericulture and Apiculture	5.3

=== Mining ===
This is a chart of proven reserves of major minerals of Tamil Nadu by Department of Geology and Mining with figures in tonnes.

Mineral	Reserve	National Share %
Lignite	30,275,000	87
Vermiculite	2,000,000	66
Garnet	23,000,000	42
Zircon	8,000,000	38
Graphite	2,000,000	33
Ilmenite	98,000,000	28
Rutile	5,000,000	27
Monazite	2,000,000	25
Magnesite	73,000,000	17

Tamil Nadu has a few mining projects based on Titanium, Lignite, Magnesite, Graphite, Limestone, Granite and Bauxite. The first one is the Neyveli Lignite Corporation that has led development of large industrial complex around Neyveli in Cuddalore district with Thermal power plants, Fertilizer, Brequetting and Carbonisation plants. Tata Iron and Steel Company (TISCO) have entered into MoU with Government of Tamil Nadu in June 2002 for establishing a titanium dioxide (TiO_{2}) plant with a project outlay of $650 million. Magnesite mining is done at Salem apart from which mining of Bauxite ores are carried out at Yercaud and this region is also rich in Iron Ore Kanjamalai. Molybdenum is found in Dharmapuri, and is the only source in the country.

=== Energy ===
==== Wind energy ====
The Tamil Nadu Energy Development Agency (TEDA) is a Tamil Nadu government promoting renewable energy sources and energy conservation activities. The agency has largely been responsible for instigating the tremendous growth of Tamil Nadu in the development of wind power. The total installed capacity of windmills in Tamil Nadu totals to around 8700MW. Muppandal wind farm is a renewable energy source, supplying the villagers with electricity for work.

==== Solar ====
In March 2008, Signet Solar Inc. signed a memorandum of understanding with the State government to build a INR 20 billion thin-film silicon photovoltaic module manufacturing plant in the Sriperumbudur Special Economic Zone. In June 2008, Moser Baer inked a MoU with the state government to build INR 20 billion plant for manufacturing of silicon-based photovoltaic thin film modules and allied products in the Oragadam Special Economic Zone which is closer to the Signet Solar's plant in Sriperumbudur.

==== Nuclear ====
The Kalpakkam Nuclear Power Plant, Ennore Thermal Plant, Neyveli Lignite Power Plant, Virudhachalam Ceramics and the Narimanam Natural Gas Plants are major sources of Tamil Nadu's electricity. It is presently adding the Koodankulam Nuclear Power Plant to its energy grid. Tamil Nadu sources some of its power needs from renewable sources with wind power contributing over 2000 MW or over 20% of the needs. Tamil Nadu is facing largest power shortage since 2009 (34.1% deficit), the highest in the country, due to industrialization over the last decade. India's leading steel producer SAIL has a steel plant in Salem, Tamil Nadu. Tamil Nadu ranks first nationwide in diesel-based thermal electricity generation with national market share of over 34%.

==== Hydroelectric ====
The Mettur Dam is one of the largest dams in India. It was completed in 1936. The total length of the dam is 1700 meters. It is also called Stanley Reservoir.

The origins of state-scale hydroelectric power in the region date back to 1927, when the Government of Madras initiated construction of the Pykara Hydroelectric project. Generation officially commenced in 1929 with subsequent expansion stages in 1943 and 1946. By 1947, the Pykara system encompasses three hydroelectric stations with a combined capacity of 104 megawatts.

The Mettur Hydro Electrical power project is also quite large Mettur Dam. Following independence, the Mettur hydroelectric power station was interconnected with the Madras thermal station in 1948, laying the foundations for a unified state power grid. That same year, the government began nationalizing private electricity distribution companies, acquiring all private licenses by 1950. Mettur has a number of industries (50 km from Salem city): SISCOL, MALCO (Madras Aluminium Company owned by Vedanta Resources), Chemplast (former known as Mettur Chemicals), Thermal power plant, Hydel power plant and huge number of chemical industries. There are many other dams that provide irrigation and drinking water, including the Vaigai Dam.

==== Bio-diesel ====
Tamil Nadu at this time is the only state to have a formal Bio-Diesel Policy to use jatropha crops as a source of biofuel and to distribute wasteland to the poor farmers for the planting of these crops.

=== Industry and manufacturing ===
One of the global electrical equipment public sector company BHEL has manufacturing plants at Tiruchirappalli and Ranipet. The Tamil Nadu state government owns the Tamil Nadu Newsprint and Papers (TNPL), the world's biggest bagasse-based paper mills in Karur and Tiruchirappalli. The world's sixth largest manufacturer of watches together with TATA, under the brand name of "Titan" which has manufacturing plant in Hosur. 40 percent of all wind-generated electricity in India is created by windmills in Tamil Nadu. Danish wind power company NEG Micon has established its manufacturing unit in Chennai.

Coimbatore is a major industrial hub in South India and houses more than 30,000 small, medium and large industries. Coimbatore is known as "Manchester of South India" due to its extensive textile industry and also referred to as "the Pump City" as it supplies half or 50% of India's requirements of motors and pumps.

=== IT/ITeS-Software ===
Tamil Nadu is one of the largest contributor of software exports majorly from its cities Chennai, Madurai, Coimbatore, Salem and Trichy. State has 526 engineering colleges, the most for any state in India giving the services industry access to qualified and skilled labour force. The top engineering colleges in Tamil Nadu have been a major recruiting hub for the IT firms. According to estimates, about 50 per cent of the human resources required for the IT and ITES industry was being sourced from the state. The state has a wide network of about 110 industrial parks and estates offering developed plots with supporting infrastructure. Also, the state government is promoting other industrial parks like Rubber Park, Apparel Parks, Floriculture Park, TIDEL Park for IT/ITS, TICEL BioPark for Biotechnology, Siruseri IT Park, Elcot SEZ and Agro Export Zones among others. Tamil Nadu has the largest number of Small and medium enterprises (SMEs) in India.

Tamil Nadu's IT sector contributed US $28 billion to India's software and services exports in FY 2024. Tamil Nadu contributes over 20% to India’s IT workforce, supporting a wide range of IT services and technologies.

=== Automotive ===
Chennai is nicknamed "The Detroit of Asia". It is home to large number of auto component industries. Over 11.2% of the S&P CNX 500 conglomerates have corporate offices in Tamil Nadu. Tamil Nadu has manufacturing facilities from automobiles, railway coaches, battle-tanks, tractors, motorbikes and heavy vehicles to ships.

==== Vehicle parts manufacturers ====
Madras Rubber Factory the local tyre manufacturer is located in Chennai and Perambalur. TI cycles of Murugappa group have their units in Chennai. UCAL Carburettors, TRW Rane, TVS Group are established in Hosur.TVS Srichakra Tyre works at Madurai. Coimbatore is home to Pricol, Elgi Equipments, Craftsman, Roots Horn, Rolon Chains and numerous Tier-I part suppliers. In September 2025, Tamil Nadu Government secured a major investment commitment from Rolls-Royce to establish a Maintenance, Repair, and Overhaul (MRO) facility, a research center, and expand their existing operations in Hosur. This agreement was finalized during his visit to the UK, focusing on boosting the state's aerospace sector.

=== Textiles and apparels ===
Tamil Nadu used to be the textile hub of India Tiruppur "Dollar City" due to its cotton production and textile industries. The textile industry plays a significant role in the Indian economy by providing direct employment to an estimated 35 million people, and thereby contributing 4% of GDP and 35% of gross export earnings. The textile sector contributes to 14% of the manufacturing sector. From Spinning to garment manufacturing, entire textile production chain facilities are in Tamil Nadu. About half of India's total spinning mill capacity is in Tamil Nadu. The western part of Tamil Nadu, comprising Coimbatore, Tirupur, Erode, Namakkal, Karur and Dindigul, has the majority of spinning mills manufacturing cotton/polyester/blended yarn, open end yarn and silk yarn used by garment units in Tamil Nadu, Maharastra etc. Yarn is also exported to China, Bangladesh etc. Tirupur knitted garment units have been exporting garments for about 3 decades with 2015–16 exports in the range of US$3 Billion. Karur is the major home textile (Curtain cloth, bed linens, kitchen linens, toilet linens, table linens, wall hangings etc.) manufacturing and export hub in India. Erode is the main cloth market in south India for both retail and wholesale ready-mades. Madras (Chennai) has a large presence of woven garments (shirts/pants) manufacturing units. Madurai and Kanchipuram are famous for handloom sarees exported / sold all over India. Lakshmi Machine Works [LMW], one of the three major textile machinery manufacturing companies in the world is located in Coimbatore. Savio also has a factory in Coimbatore. Many textile component manufacturers are in Coimbatore and some export to the Europe etc.

=== Aerospace and defence ===
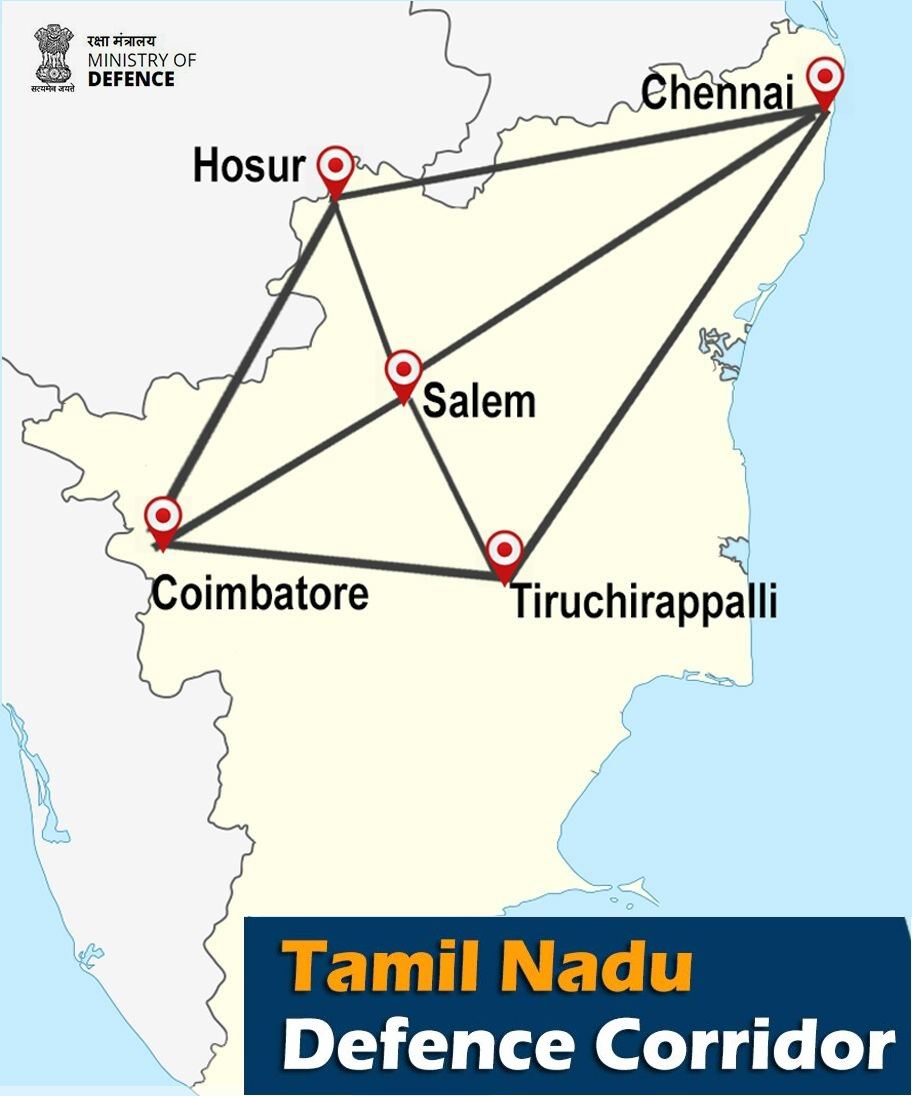
Tamil Nadu Defence Corridor

The defence industry in Tamil Nadu is one of the fastest growing sector in the states generating a huge amount of export revenue. Avadi in Chennai is the major and biggest defence industrial corridor stands out first in the defence exports of the state which headquarters many defence industries for numerous defence manufacturing public undertakings such as Heavy Vehicles Factory, Armoured Vehicles Nigam, Engine Factory Avadi, Combat Vehicles Research and Development Establishment, DRDO and Ordnance Depot. The other major defence industries of the state are Ordnance Factory Tiruchirappalli, L&T Aerospace & Defence unit Coimbatore, LMW Advanced Technology Centre Coimbatore, Ashok Leyland Defence Systems, Mahindra Aerospace, Ramco Systems, TANEJA Aerospace and Salem Aerospace Limited. The state has the country's first defence corridor and aerospace park. The principal cities manufacturing defence and aerospace components are Chennai, Coimbatore, Tiruchirappalli, Salem and the secondary manufacturing cities are Nagercoil and Hosur. French aerospace and defence company, Airbus decided to invest 1 billion dollar (7,200 crores) in an aerospace project in Chennai. The company has also planned to build a helicopter assembly factory in Tamil Nadu. Tier - II cities of Coimbatore and Salem also serves as a major export hub for defence manufacturing firms. Defence, paramilitary and police personnel across the nation use guns, ammunitions and bullets manufactured from the city. Special grade steel used in making missiles are manufactured in Salem. India's multinational engineering conglomerate L&T joint venture with France-based MBDA, a world leader in missile systems planned a "L&T MBDA Missile Systems" facility at Aspen SEZ in Coimbatore serves as its hub to export fully assembled missile systems to Europe.

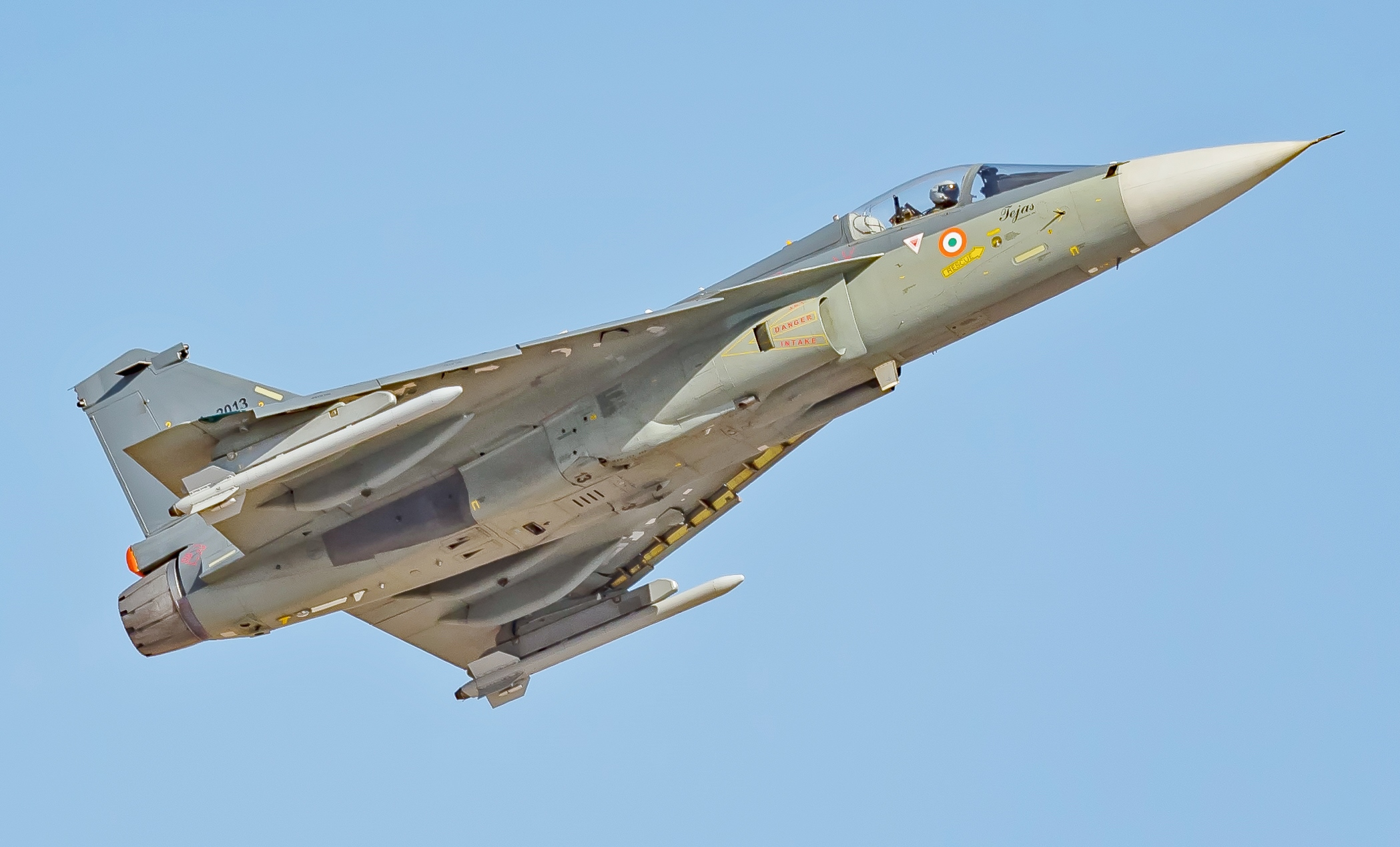
IAF's Tejas fighter aircraft

Tamil Nadu also is the hub station where the first Indian made Fifth-generation jet fighter plane is to be manufactured. The Aeronautical Development Agency, which conceived and designed the Light Combat Aircraft (LCA) Tejas, set the ball rolling for building the next generation defence aircraft, the Advanced Medium Combat Aircraft (AMCA), by initiating in Coimbatore to build a technology demonstrator. The project – to be implemented in Sulur in Coimbatore district which will house the permanent base of the Tejas squadron – marks one of Tamil Nadu's first major defence aircraft project.

=== Electronics ===
Electronics manufacturing is a growing industry in Tamil Nadu. Chennai has emerged as EMS Hub of India. Companies like Flextronics, Motorola, Sony-Ericsson, Foxconn, Samsung, Cisco, and Dell have chosen Chennai as their South Asian manufacturing hub. Products manufactured include circuit boards and cellular phone handsets. Ericsson also has a Research and Development facility in Chennai. Big EPC companies have set up their Engineering centres which include Saipem India Projects Ltd, Technip, Foster Wheeler, Schneider Electric, Mott MacDonald, Petrofac, Austrian company "Austrian Energy and Environment" have also a design office here besides local giant ECC Larsen & Toubro. Reliance Industries and Sanmina-SCI formed a joint venture in 2022 to manufacture electronics in Tamil Nadu. Nokia Siemens Networks has decided to build a manufacturing plant for wireless network equipment in Tamil Nadu.

The state with a projected population of about 66.5 million in year 2009 has a high mobile market share in India. According to statistics released by Telecom Regulatory Authority of India (TRAI), the state had a total subscriber base of 43 million mobile customers at the beginning of August 2009.

=== Leather ===
Tamil Nadu accounts for 60 per cent of leather tanning capacity in India and 38 per cent of all leather footwear, garments and components. The state also accounts for 50 per cent of leather exports from India, valued at around US$3.3 billion of the total US$6.5 billion from India. Hundreds of leather and tannery facilities are located around Vellore and its nearby towns, such as Ranipet, Ambur and Vaniyambadi. The Vellore district is the top exporter of finished leather goods in the country. Vellore leather accounts for more than 37 percent of the country's export of leather and leather-related products (such as finished leathers, shoes, garments and gloves).

=== Fireworks ===
The city of Sivakasi is a leader in the areas of printing, fireworks, and safety matches. It was fondly called as "Little Japan" by Jawaharlal Nehru. It contributes to 90% of India's fireworks production. Over 2,345 licensed fireworks factories are present around Sivakasi city and up to 100,000 people are working in the fireworks industry. Sivakasi provides over 60% of India's total offset printing solutions.

=== Banking ===
The first modern bank in Tamil Nadu, Bank of Madras was started by the British in 1843. It was followed by the opening of other banks namely – Arbuthnot & Co, Bank of Chettinad, Bank of Madura, that were later merged under the supervision of RBI. The state serves as the headquarters for the second most banks in India, only next to the financial Capital Mumbai. The banking sector in Tamil Nadu is broadly classified into scheduled banks and non-scheduled banks. All banks included in the Second Schedule to the Reserve Bank of India Act, 1934 are Scheduled Banks. These banks are Scheduled Commercial Banks and Scheduled Co-operative Banks. Scheduled Co-operative Banks consist of Scheduled State Co-operative Banks and Scheduled Urban Cooperative Banks. Scheduled Commercial Banks in Tamil Nadu are categorised into five different groups according to their ownership and/or nature of operation:

- Nationalised Banks
- Private Sector Banks
- Foreign Banks
- Regional Rural Banks
- Small Finance Banks

Banks based in Tamil Nadu
Bank Name	Established	Headquarter	Branches	Revenues	Total Assets	Ref/Notes
Indian Bank	1907	Chennai	2,836	₹43,414.34 crore (US$4.5 billion)	₹394,771 crore (US$41 billion)	
Indian Overseas Bank	1937	Chennai	3,350	₹43,120.09 crore (US$4.5 billion)	₹374,436.76 crore (US$39 billion)	
Karur Vysya Bank	1916	Karur	790	₹9,987.3 crore (US$1.0 billion)	₹107,663.72 crore (US$11 billion)	
City Union Bank	1904	Kumbakonam	623	₹4,596.4 crore (US$480 million)	₹66,289.44 crore (US$6.9 billion)	
Lakshmi Vilas Bank	1926	Chennai	565	₹2,568.4 crore (US$270 million)	₹56,287.92 crore (US$5.8 billion)	
Tamilnad Mercantile Bank Limited	1921	Thoothukudi	509	₹3,911.7 crore (US$410 million)	₹63,467.98 crore (US$6.6 billion)	
Equitas Small Finance Bank	2007	Chennai	412	₹1,908.77 crore (US$200 million)	₹23,086.5 crore (US$2.4 billion)	
Tamil Nadu Grama Bank	2019	Salem	630	₹1,824.36 crore (equivalent to ₹22 billion or US$230 million in 2026)	₹25,438.02 crore (US$2.6 billion)	
Repco Bank	1969	Chennai	153	₹984.5 crore (US$100 million)	₹16,515 crore (US$1.7 billion)	
TNSC Bank	1905	Chennai	100+	₹485.7 crore (US$50 million)	₹11,216 crore (US$1.2 billion)	

=== Transportation ===
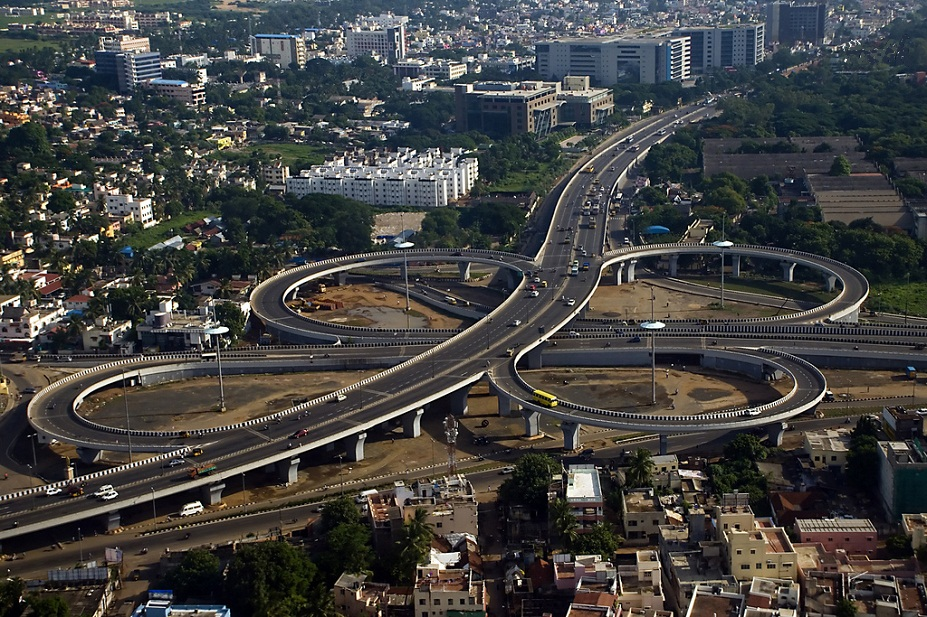
Kathipara Junction in Chennai

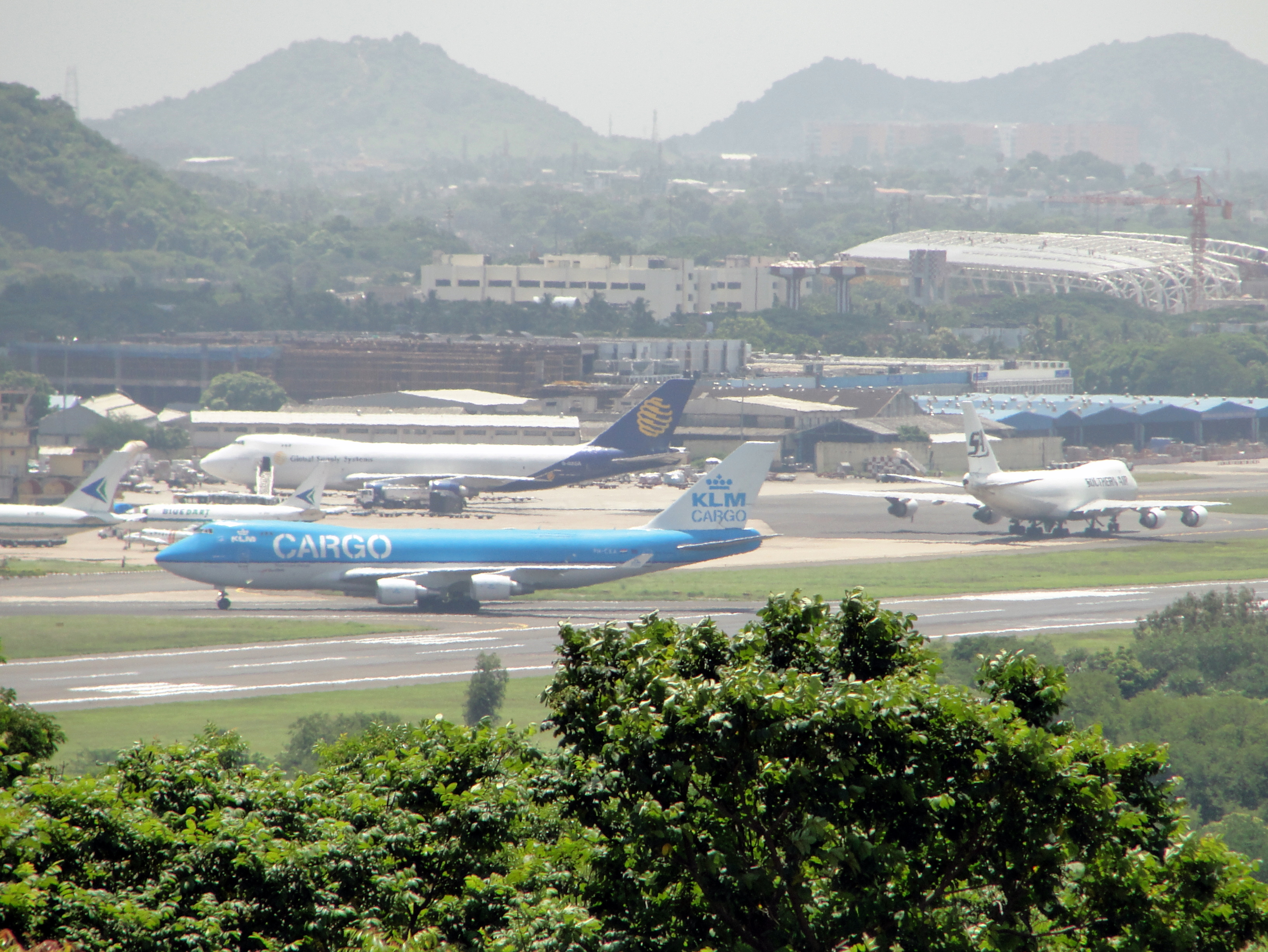
Three 747s at Chennai Cargo Terminal. Chennai cargo terminal is the second busiest in India.

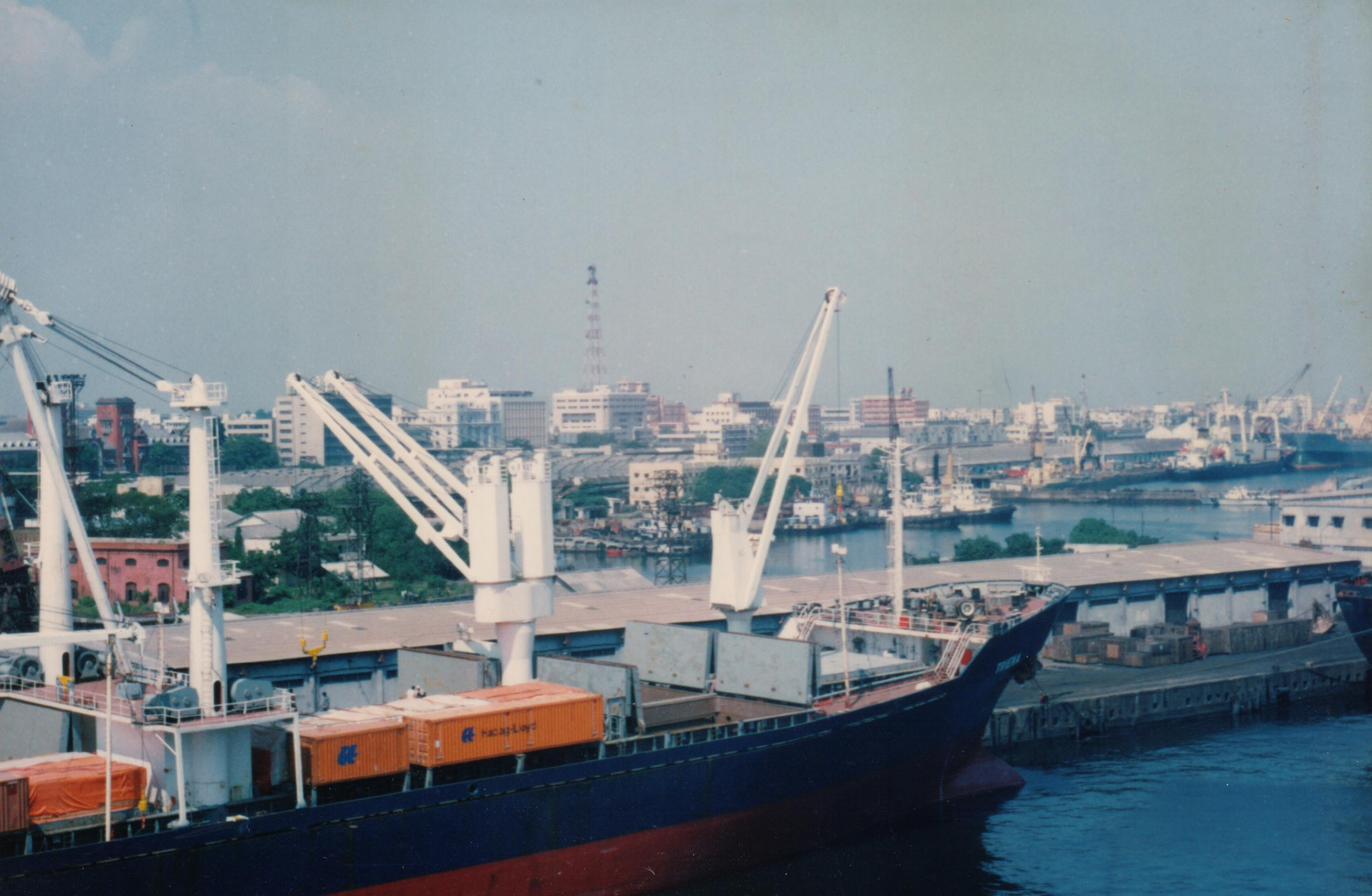
The Madras Port, the second biggest port in South Asia

Tamil Nadu has a well established transportation system that connects all parts of the state. This is partly responsible for the investment in the state. Though the present transportation system is substantial, it needs to be developed further to keep pace with the rapid increase in use. Tamil Nadu is served by an extensive road network in terms of its spread and quality, providing links between urban centres, agricultural market-places and rural habitations in the countryside.

==== Road ====
There are 28 national highways in the state, covering a total distance of 5,036 km (3,129 mi). The state is also a terminus for North-South Corridor Road (NH44) and the Golden Quadrilateral project that is 99.2% completed as of 31 July 2010. Chennai Mofussil Bus Terminus is the largest bus terminal in Tamil Nadu. The state has a total road length of 167,000 km, of which 60,628 km are maintained by Highways Department. This is nearly 2.5 times higher than the density of all-India road network. It ranks second with a share of over 20% in total road projects under operation in the public-private partnership model. It is currently working on upgrading its road network, though the pace of work is considered slow.

==== Railway ====
Tamil Nadu has a well-developed rail network as part of Southern Railway. Headquartered at Chennai, the present Southern Railway network extends over a large area of India's Southern Peninsula, covering the states of Tamil Nadu, Kerala, Puducherry, minor portions of Karnataka and Andhra Pradesh. Tamil Nadu has a total railway track length of 6,693 km and there are 690 railway stations in the state. The system connects it with most major cities in India. Main rail junctions in the state include Chennai, Coimbatore, Madurai, Katpadi, Erode, Thanjavur, Trichy, Salem and Tirunelveli. Chennai has a well-established Suburban Railway network, a Mass Rapid Transport System and is currently developing a Metro system, with its first underground stretch operational since May 2017. Rapid transit (metro) or light metro system in Coimbatore and Madurai are currently in under process

==== Air ====
Tamil Nadu has a major international airport, Chennai International Airport, that is connected with 27 countries with more than 500 direct flights every day. Other international airports in Tamil Nadu include Coimbatore International Airport, Madurai International Airport and Trichy International Airport. Chennai International Airport is currently the fourth largest international airport in India after Delhi, Mumbai, and Bangalore has a passenger growth of 18%. It also has domestic airports at Salem, Thoothukudi making several parts of the state easily accessible. Increased industrial activity has given rise to an increase in passenger traffic as well as freight movement which has been growing at over 21.3 per cent per year. Also in 2024, the state government proposed Chennai Greenfield Airport as a greenfield airport project to serve the Chennai Metropolitan Area in the Indian state of Tamil Nadu. It is planned to be built near Parandur in Kanchipuram district, and will serve as the secondary airport alongside the existing Chennai International Airport.

==== Ports ====
Tamil Nadu has four major ports at Chennai, Ennore, Kattupalli and Tuticorin, as well as one intermediate port, Nagapattinam, and seven minor ports, Rameswaram, Kanyakumari, Cuddalore, Colachel, Karaikal, Pamban and Valinokkam of which are currently capable of handling over 73 million metric tonnes of cargo annually (24 per cent share of India). All the minor ports are managed by the Tamil Nadu Maritime Board. Chennai Port is an artificial harbour situated on the Coromandel Coast in South-East India and it is the second principal port in the country for handling containers. It is currently being upgraded to have a dedicated terminal for cars capable of handling 400,000 vehicles by 2009 to be used by Hyundai, Ford and Nissan Renault. Ennore Port was recently converted from an intermediate port to a major port and handles all the coal and ore traffic in Tamil Nadu. The volume of cargo in the ports grew by 13 per cent over 2005. The Tuticorin Port is expanding its facilities at the cost of US$1.6 billion.

=== Tourism ===
Owing to the ancientness and depth of its civilization, Tamil Nadu has been a hub for tourism. In recent years, the state has emerged as one of the leading tourist destination for both domestic and foreign tourists. Tourism in Tamil Nadu is promoted by Tamil Nadu Tourism Development Corporation (TTDC), a Government of Tamil Nadu undertaking. The state currently ranks the highest among Indian states with about 248 million arrivals in 2013. The annual growth rate of the industry stood at 16 per cent. Approximately 2,804,687 foreign and 111,637,104 domestic tourists visited the state in 2010.

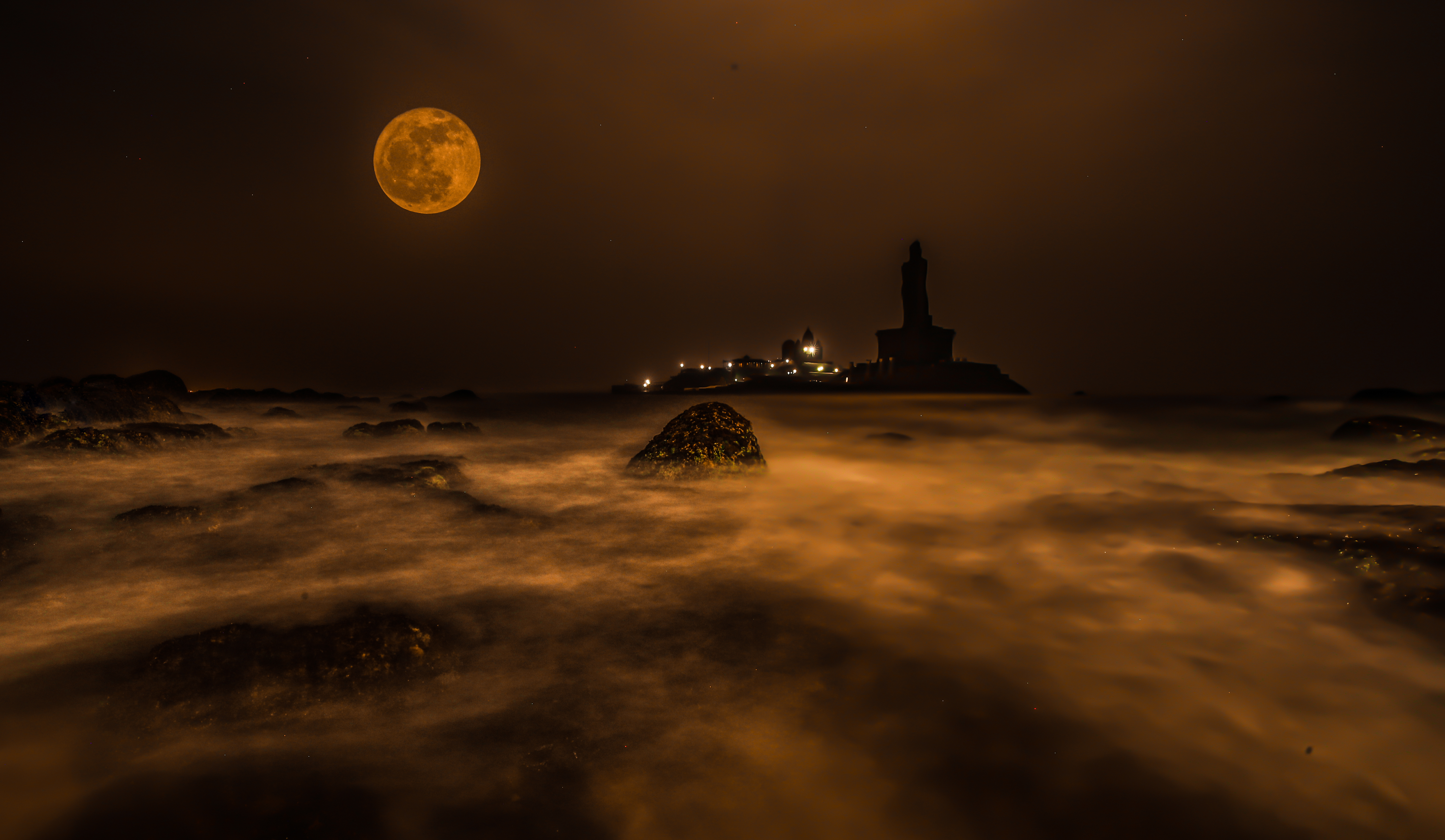
Statue of Thiruvalluvar, Kanniyakumari, Tamil Nadu

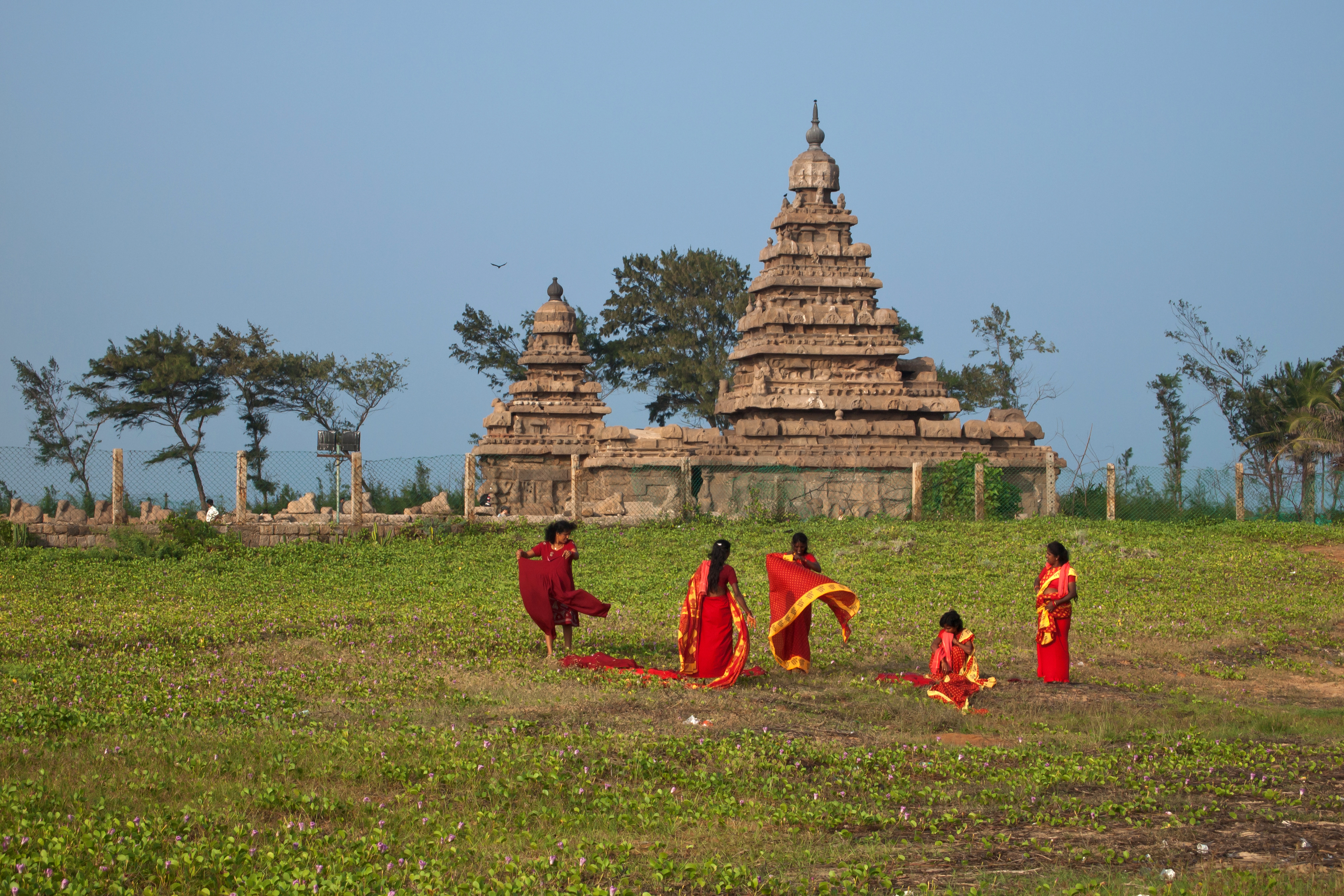
Shore Temple, Mahabalipuram (built in 700–728 AD) in Tamil Nadu

=== Services ===
Tamil Nadu has 526 engineering colleges, the most for any state in India giving the services industry access to qualified and skilled labour force. The state has a wide network of about 110 industrial parks and estates offering developed plots with supporting infrastructure. Also, the state government is promoting other industrial parks like Rubber Park, Apparel Parks, Floriculture Park, TIDEL Park for IT/ITS, TICEL BioPark for Biotechnology, Siruseri IT Park, Elcot SEZ and Agro Export Zones among others. Tamil Nadu has the largest number of Small and medium enterprises (SMEs) in India.

Software Parks

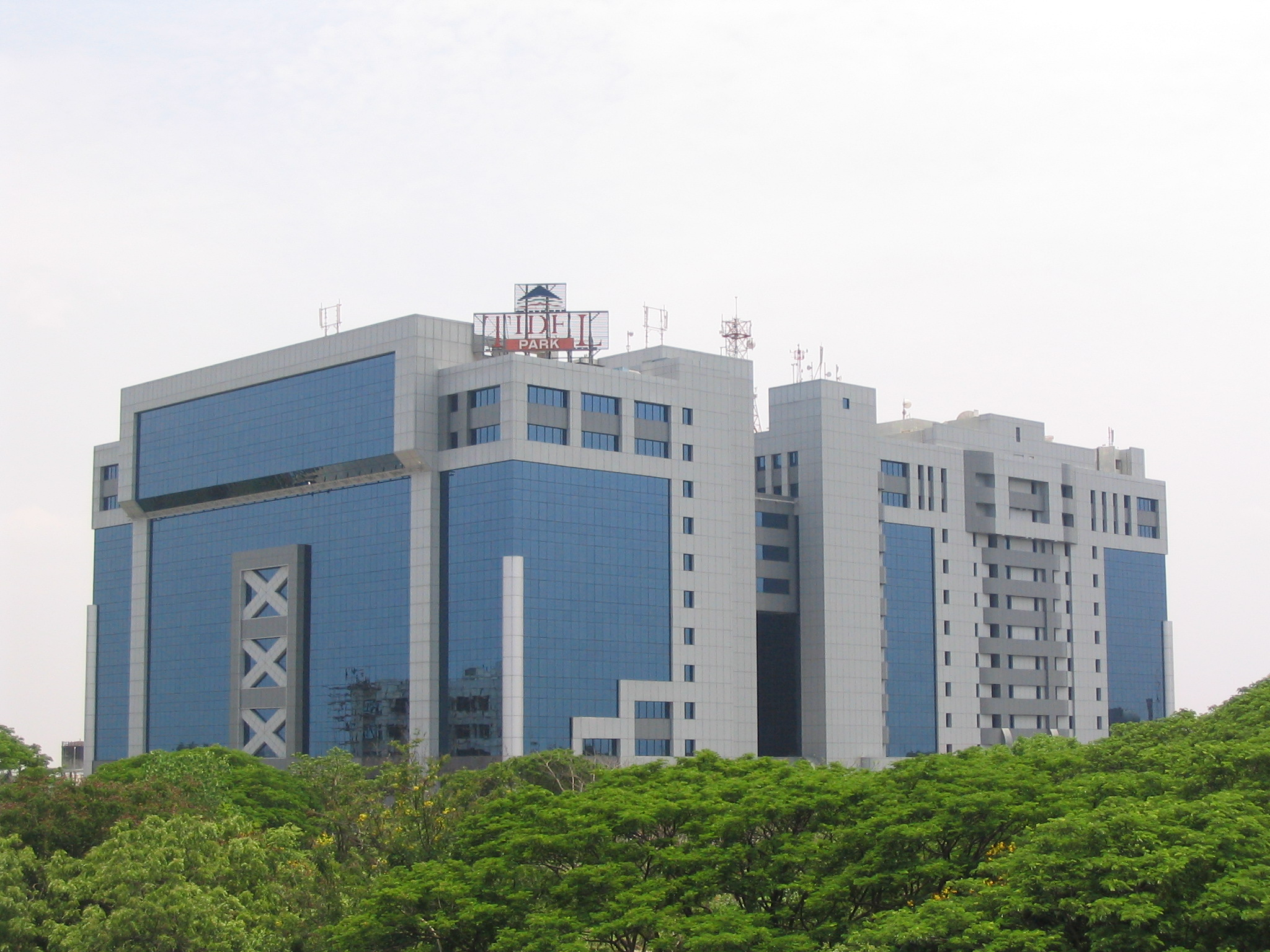
Tidel Park, Chennai

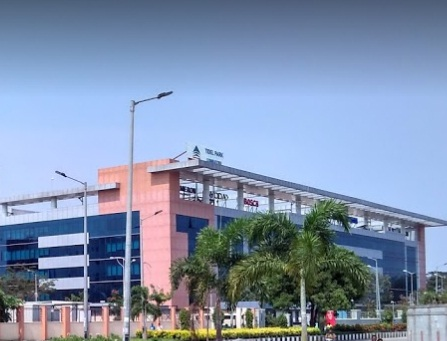
Tidel Park, Coimbatore

This is a chart of trend of software exports from Tamil Nadu published by Electronics Corporation of Tamil Nadu with figures in Crores of Indian Rupees.

Year	Software exports
1995	₹370 crore (US$38 million)
2000	₹31,160 crore (US$3.2 billion)
2005	₹41,150 crore (US$4.3 billion)
2010	₹62,100 crore (US$6.4 billion)
2013	₹82,450 crore (US$8.6 billion)
2017	₹111,179 crore (US$12 billion)
2018	₹139,129 crore (US$14 billion)

Chennai is the second largest software exporter in India, next only to Bangalore. India's largest IT park is housed at Chennai. Software exports from Tamil Nadu during 2017–2018 rose 8.6% per cent to touch 1,11,179 crore, involving a workforce of 780,000. Chennai is the largest hub for e-publishing, as there are 67 e-publishing units registered with the STPI in Chennai and 25 in Bangalore. Companies such as HCL Technologies, NTT DATA, Wipro, Tata Consultancy Services, Capgemini, Amazon.com, LTI, Tech Mahindra, Infosys, IBM, Cognizant, Accenture, Sopra Steria, CGI Inc., Verizon, DXC Technology, Atos, Virtusa and many others have offices in Chennai. Infosys Technologies has set up India's largest software development centre to house 25,000 software professionals at an estimated investment of ₹12,500 million (US$130 million) in Chennai. India's largest IT park – SIPCOT is housed at Siruseri – Chennai, It has numerous IT companies such as TCS, CTS, Syntel, Steria, Polaris, Patni, Hexaware etc. Chennai has been rated as the most attractive city for offshoring services. Coimbatore is second largest Software exporter in Tamil Nadu with presence of Amazon.com, Bosch, Cognizant, Ford, NTT Data, TCS, Wipro, HCL, Capgemini, Harman, Deloitte. Cognizant has more than 13,000 employees working in Coimbatore, which is their second largest headcount in India after Chennai. Bosch has one of the largest R&D development centre in Coimbatore outside Germany which employees close to 5500 in the city. Madurai is the next biggest IT city. Companies like HCL, Honeywell, Mindtree, Tata Consultancy Services are in Madurai. A new TIDEL park is proposed at Madurai in Mattuthavani. The IT Companies like Sutherland, TTS Business Services, Sun Business Solution (Sun Group), Scientific Publishing, Omega Healthcare, Vagus Technologies, MMC Infotech are also in Tiruchirappalli.

Chennai has emerged as the "SaaS Capital of India". The SaaS sector in/around Chennai generated US$1 Billion in revenue and employed about 10000 personnel in 2018.

== Government revenues ==
Tamil Nadu ranks fourth nationwide of all state governments in tax revenue. (See: States of India by tax revenues.) This is a chart of trend of tax revenues (including the shares from Union tax pool) extracted from the Consolidated Fund of the Government of Tamil Nadu with figures in millions of Indian Rupees. See also the Finance Commission of India report. Tax revenues of local bodies are excluded.

Year	Tax revenues	Sales tax	Excise duties	Registration fees	Corporation tax	Vehicle tax
1950	441 (Note: includes the province of Hyderabad)					
1955	270	112 (Note: includes revenues from non-ferrous mining and metallurgical industries)	3	7		
1960	417	191				
1965	723	409	4	99 (Note: includes stamp fees)		133
1970						
1975	3,190					
1980						
1985						
1990	34,508	20,659	4,348	2,263		2,273
1995	79,045	46,892	9,346	6,130		3,922
2000	150,659	81,971	18,686	9,101		5,904
2005	253,232	143,607 (Note: includes tax on trades)	24,780	15,628 (Note: includes stamp fees)	13,846	11,305

This is a chart of trend of non-tax revenues and grants-in-aid extracted from the Consolidated Fund of the Government of Tamil Nadu with figures in millions of Indian Rupees. See also and. Non-tax revenues of local bodies are excluded.

Year	Non-tax revenues	Interest	Mining	Grants-in-aid
1960	197			114
1965	466			233
1970				
1975				
1980				
1985				
1990	3,814	897	588	12,555
1995	8,584	3,428	672	18,362
2000	17,107	4,036	3,953	15,398
2005	21,014	5,673	4,274 (Note: includes revenues from non-ferrous mining and metallurgical industries)	28,268

== Government debt ==
Amount in Crores:

Fin year	Bought	Repaid	Total debt
31 March 2000			23,840
31 March 2001			28,685
31 March 2006			57,457
31 March 2007			60,170
31 March 2008			64,655
31 March 2009			74,858
31 March 2011			1,12,000
31 March 2012			1,35,060
2013 - 2014			1,55,129
2014 - 2015			1,78,170
2015 - 2016			2,11,483
2016 - 2017			2,52,431
2017 - 2018			3,14,366
2018 - 2019			3,55,845
2019 - 2020			3,97,000
2020 - 2021			4,56,661
2021-22			6,02,000
2022-23			6,50,000
2023-24			7,25,000
2024-25			8,55,000
2025-26			10,05,000
2026-27			10,50,000

== District-wise data ==
Gross District Domestic Product and Per Capita Income Year : 2022-23
District	GDDP		PCI		#
District	in ₹ Crore	US$ Billion	in ₹	US$	#
Chengalpattu	₹203,172 crore	US$24 billion	₹7,46,994	US$8,800	▲1
Kanchipuram	₹92,456 crore	US$11 billion	₹7,44,980	US$8,800	▼1
Chennai	₹289,481 crore	US$34 billion	₹5,85,501	US$6,900	Steady
Namakkal	₹83,482 crore	US$8.6 billion	₹4,54,423	US$5,400	Steady
Tiruppur	₹116,376 crore	US$14 billion	₹4,41,201	US$5,200	Steady
Tiruvallur	₹170,946 crore	US$20 billion	₹4,30,950	US$5,100	Steady
Coimbatore	₹152,044 crore	US$18 billion	₹4,13,233	US$4,900	Steady
Krishnagiri	₹74,822 crore	US$8.9 billion	₹3,74,090	US$4,400	Steady
Erode	₹70,977 crore	US$8.4 billion	₹2,96,247	US$3,500	Steady
Madurai	₹87,605 crore	US$10 billion	₹2,70,995	US$3,200	Steady
Thiruchirapalli	₹75,820 crore	US$8.0 billion	₹2,61,763	US$3,100	Steady
Thoothukudi	₹47,759 crore	US$5.6 billion	₹2,56,468	US$3,000	▲2
Dindigul	₹58,900 crore	US$7.0 billion	₹2,56,308	US$3,000	Steady
Salem	₹94,156 crore	US$11 billion	₹2,54,137	US$3,000	▲1
Dharmapuri	₹40,362 crore	US$4.8 billion	₹2,51,747	US$3,000	▼3
Karur	₹28,014 crore	US$3.3 billion	₹2,47,342	US$2,900	▲1
Virudhunagar	₹50,960 crore	US$6.0 billion	₹2,46,588	US$2,900	▼1
Ranipet	₹30,914 crore	US$3.7 billion	₹2,40,069	US$2,800	▲1
Vellore	₹41,134 crore	US$4.9 billion	₹2,39,491	US$2,800	▼1
Tirupathur	₹28,325 crore	US$3.4 billion	₹2,39,440	US$2,800	▲1
Tenkasi	₹35,799 crore	US$4.2 billion	₹2,39,029	US$2,800	▼1
Tirunelveli	₹41,871 crore	US$5.0 billion	₹2,36,315	US$2,800	Steady
Kanyakumari	₹44,350 crore	US$5.2 billion	₹2,22,856	US$2,600	Steady
Theni	₹27,702 crore	US$3.3 billion	₹2,08,976	US$2,500	▲1
Thanjavur	₹52,462 crore	US$6.2 billion	₹2,04,940	US$2,400	▲3
Nilgiris	₹16,280 crore	US$1.9 billion	₹2,08,064	US$2,500	▼2
Nagapattinam	₹15,156 crore	US$1.8 billion	₹2,04,054	US$2,400	▼1
Sivaganga	₹28,523 crore	US$3.4 billion	₹2,00,194	US$2,400	▲1
Tiruvannamalai	₹52,279 crore	US$6.2 billion	₹1,99,340	US$2,400	▼2
Cuddalore	₹54,312 crore	US$6.4 billion	₹1,95,881	US$2,300	Steady
Pudukottai	₹32,725 crore	US$3.9 billion	₹1,90,049	US$2,200	▲1
Ramanathapuram	₹26,981 crore	US$3.2 billion	₹1,87,365	US$2,200	▼
Kallakurichi	₹27,189 crore	US$3.2 billion	₹1,86,489	US$2,200	▲1
Ariyalur	₹14,164 crore	US$1.7 billion	₹1,76,348	US$2,100	▼1
Mayiladuthurai	₹16,674 crore	US$2.0 billion	₹1,70,651	US$2,000	Steady
Perambalur	₹10,199 crore	US$1.2 billion	₹1,69,601	US$2,000	Steady
Villuppuram	₹36,856 crore	US$4.4 billion	₹1,65,501	US$2,000	▲1
Tiruvarur	₹22,119 crore	US$2.6 billion	₹1,64,431	US$1,900	▼1

== Gallery ==
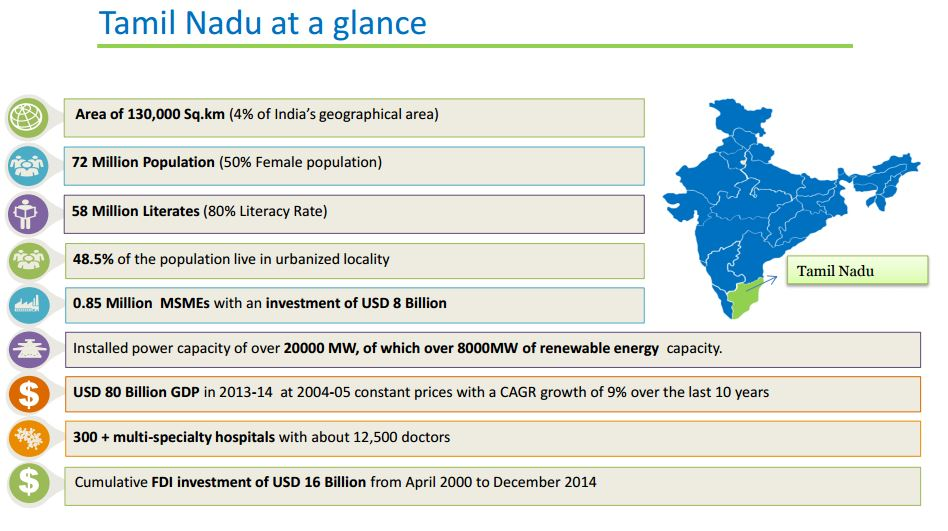
Stats about Tamil Nadu

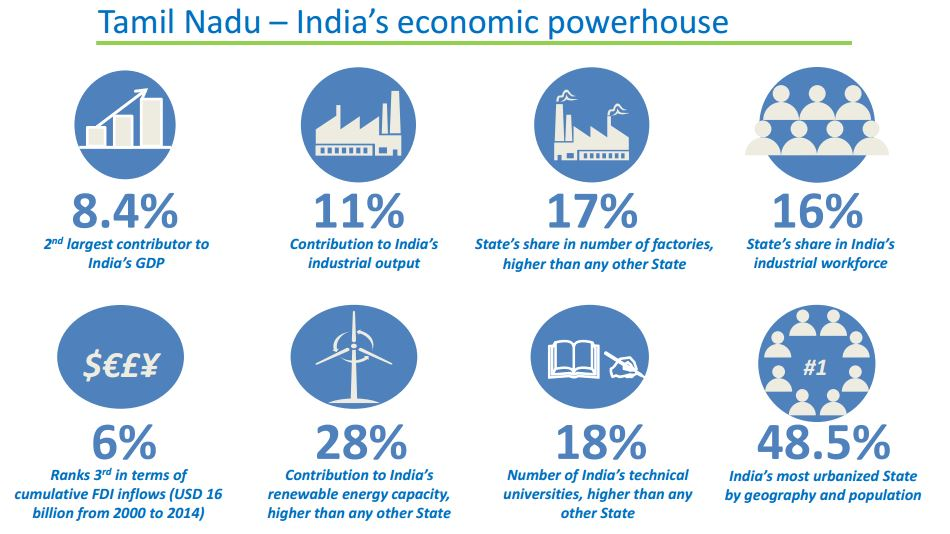
Tamil Nadu – India's economic powerhouse

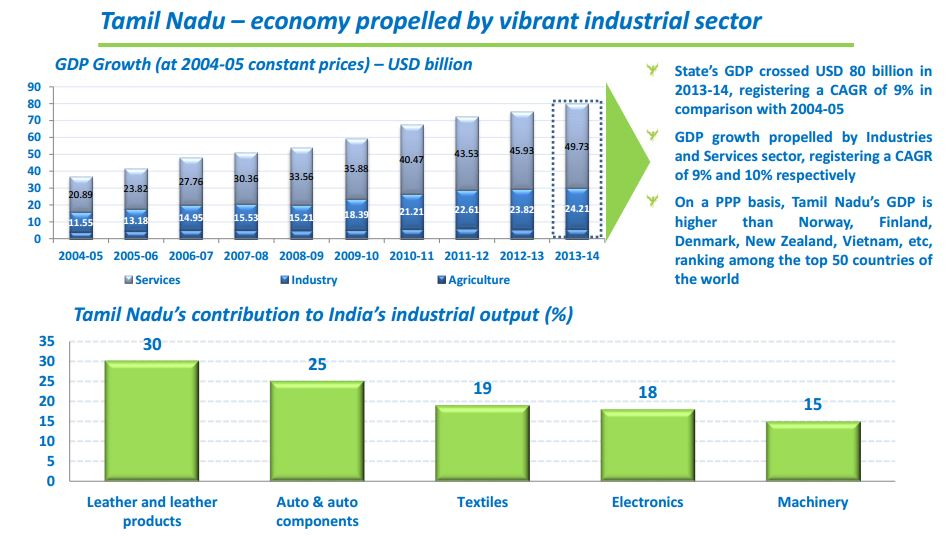
Tamil Nadu's contribution to India's industrial output

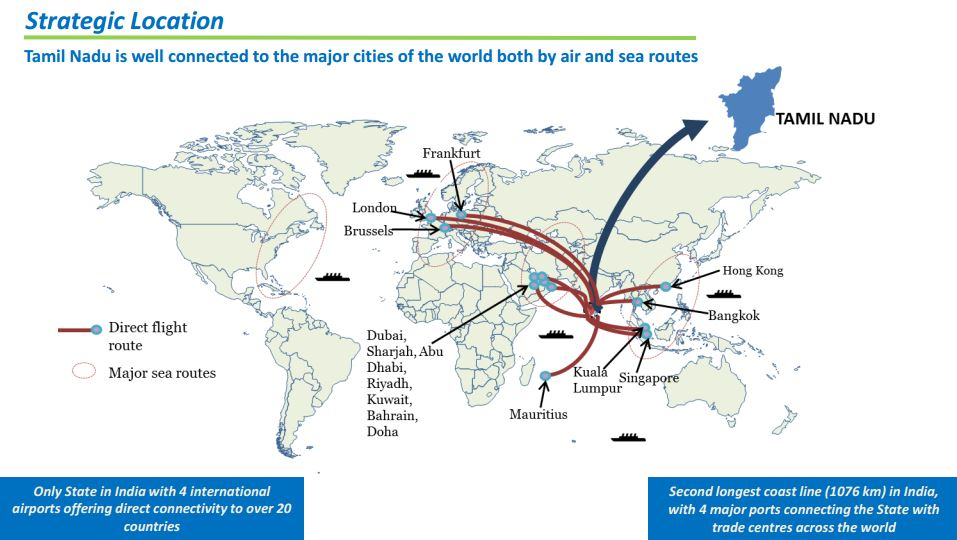
Strategic location of Tamil Nadu

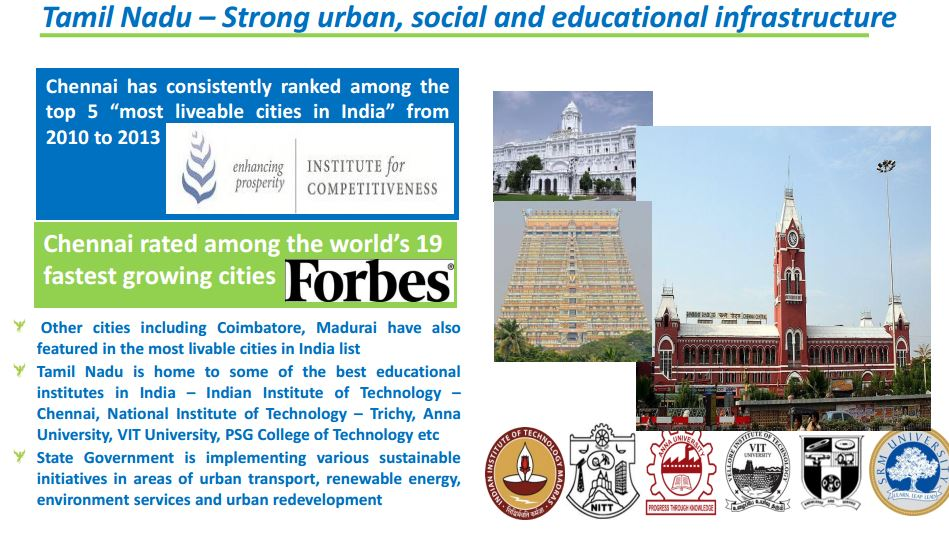
Tamil Nadu's strong social and educational infrastructure

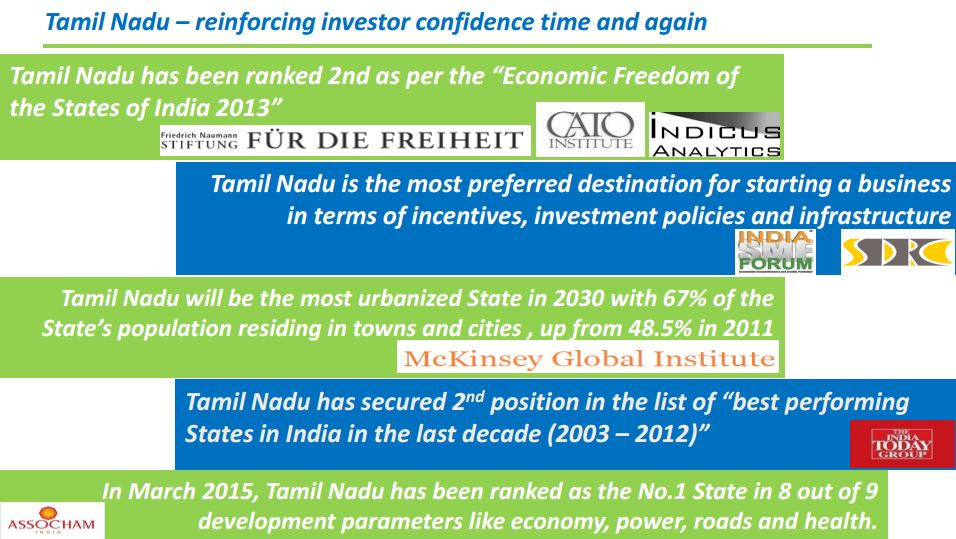
Tamil Nadu rankings

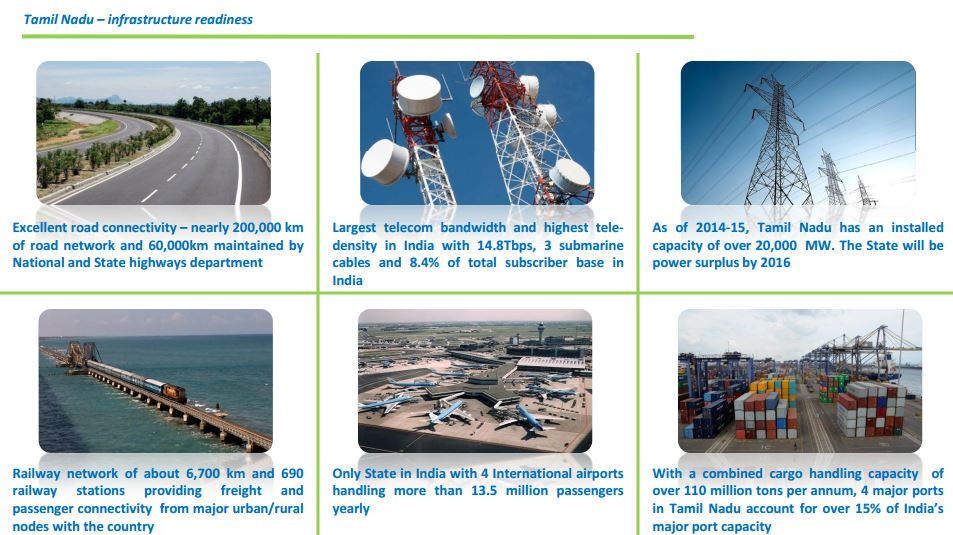
Tamil Nadu statistics
