= Tamil Nadu Global Investors Meet =

Business summit

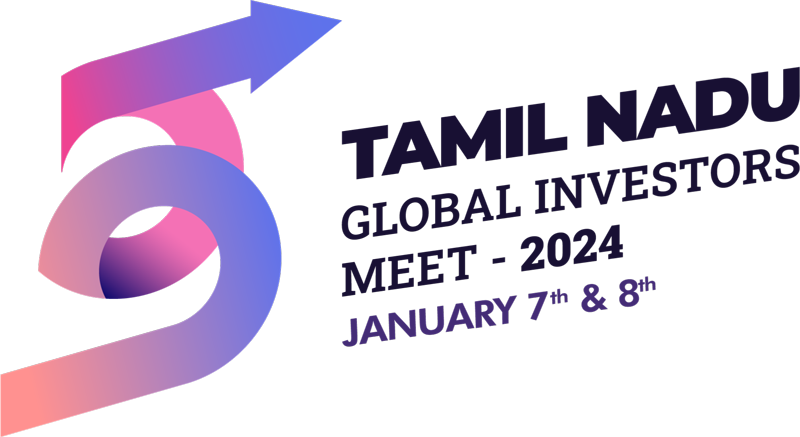
- Genre: Investment summit
- Venue: Chennai Trade Centre
- Location: Chennai
- Inaugurated: 2015
- Previous event: Tamil Nadu Global Investors Meet 2024
- Next event: TBA
- Organizer: Government of Tamil Nadu
- Website: www.tngim2024.com

Tamil Nadu Global Investors Meet (TNGIM) is a business summit organized by Government of Tamil Nadu to facilitate domestic and foreign investments in the state. The first of these summits took place in 2015 and later in 2019. The third and latest meet took place in January 2024.

== 2015 ==
The first meet was organized by the then chief minister of Tamil Nadu J. Jayalalithaa at the Chennai Trade Centre in Chennai. The government signed more than 100 MoUs with various investors to raise ₹2.4 lakh crores of investment.

== 2019 ==
The second meet was organized by then chief minister of Tamil Nadu Edappadi K. Palaniswami and was held on 23 and 24 January 2019 at the same location as the previous meet. The Government of Tamil Nadu facilitated the signing of 304 MoUs for a total investment of ₹3 lakh crores (US$42 billion). Adani Group and Indian Oil Corporation committed to investing ₹28,000 crores (US$3.9 billion), the majority of which was to develop the Kattupalli shipyard. Japan announced that All Nippon Airways would start daily flights between Narita and Chennai to facilitate economic development.

== 2024 ==
On 10 August 2023, Chief Minister M. K. Stalin unveiled the new logo and announced the dates for the Tamil Nadu Global Investors Meet 2024, which is set to take place on 7 and 8 January 2024. The focus sectors for investments include automobile, electronics, Information technology, electric vehicles, aerospace, renewable energy, pharmaceuticals, textiles, chemicals, food processing, heavy engineering, leather and fintech.

The Investors meet attracted ₹6.64 lakh crore investment which was double the investment than the 2019 meet. The largest Investors were Tata Power (₹70,800 crore), Adani group (₹42,768 crore), Singapore's Sembcorp (₹36,238 crore), Leap Green (₹22,000 crore) and CPCL Ltd (₹17,000 crore). The Godrej Consumer Products Limited (GCPL) also signed an MoU with the Tamil Nadu state government to build a manufacturing facility near Chennai. About 50% of the employees will be women, along with 5% of employees from LGBTQ community and people with disability (PWD).

== See also ==
- Economy of Tamil Nadu
- Economy of Chennai
