= Chennai Aero Park =

Proposed aerospace industrial park in India

Coordinates: 13.052883°N 80.249859°E

Chennai Aero Park is an aerospace industrial park in Chennai, India. The proposal is supported by the Confederation of Indian Industry, and it is estimated that the park will take up 250 acres (1.0 km^{2}) of land. The Park would attract global players and engage in the design, manufacture and maintenance of all types of aircraft for both civil and military programmes, including training and education.

With the objective of creating an integrated ecosystem for Aerospace Industry development covering design, engineering, manufacturing, servicing and maintenance of aircraft for civil and defence sector in Tamil Nadu, TIDCO is establishing an Aerospace components’ manufacturing park for aerospace industry in Sriperumbudhur (Chennai) in an area of around 250 acres( expandable to 700 acres). The developed plots in sizes of 1 acre, 2 acres, 5 acres, 10 acres, etc in the park will be offered to the aerospace companies. This park will have the following facilities.

1. Metal/composite manufacturing facilities
2. Technology and IT services
3. Avionics
4. Assembly facilities and maintenance facilities
5. Training and R&D

The park will have developed industrial plot in the utilities like power and water and facilitate the building of communication, connectivity and social infrastructures to suit to specific needs of the park. The road connectivity will be developed to the aerospace Park.

List of Companies that have been allotted land:

- SOSHER Dronecrafts (OPC) Pvt. Ltd.
- Bhastrik Mechanical Labs Pvt. Ltd.
- Balaa Works
- Balaa HAR Conn Aerospace Services Pvt. Ltd.
- Metallic Bellows (India) Pvt. Ltd.
- Metalscan Inspection Services
- Intigle Technologies India Private Limited
- Despat Pvt. Ltd.
- Centroid Design Pvt. Ltd.
- Vinmn Aerospace Pvt. Ltd.
- Techware Systems Pvt. Ltd. (formerly Known as Lab Electronics Pvt. Ltd.)
- Industrial NDT Inspection Co.

== See also ==
- Economy of Chennai
