= Valinokkam =

Village in Tamil Nadu, India

Coordinates: 9°10′N 78°39′E

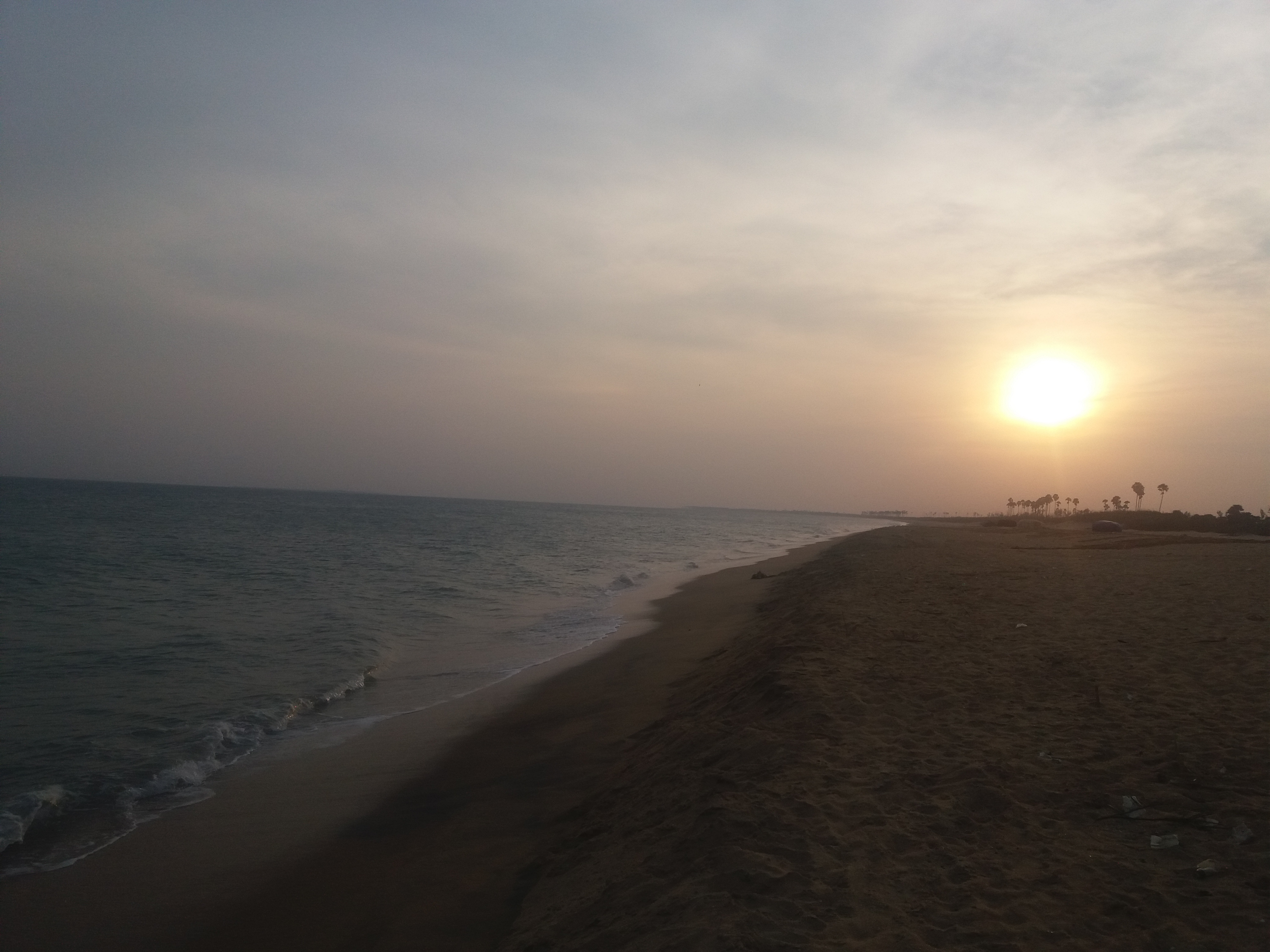

Valinokkam is a village in Ramanathapuram district in Tamil Nadu. Because it is near the seashore, Valinokkam is famous for salt production. The Tamil Nadu Salt corporation started Salt production from Valinokkam in the year 1974. It is also well known for the shrine of Imraan Ummayah Al Badawiyyah shaheed and Sulthan Abdul Qadir Popularly called as Peer Muhammad, Noor Muhammad waliyullah Dargah by the local people.

== Village ==
The village is situated on a peninsula. This village is peaceful and cover of nature in Gulf of Mannar. Hence, it played an essential role in the ancient wars which occurred in the region. An aesthetically pleasing Masjid is said to have been constructed by Jinns, which was originally constructed by Vavwali Naina Mohamed marraicayar of kilakarai (grandfather of vallal seethakathi marraikayar) who build many stone masjids in sea shore area of Kerala, Tamil Nadu and andhra he built many masjid in cylone also which resembles by his own symbol embossed in those masjid which was very clearly shown in his tomb (old jumma masjid oldest masjid of India) in Kilakarai.

== Beaches ==
Valinokkam is famous for its pristine beaches and popular among local visitors. Families often choose south beach of Valinokkam as their favourite picnic spot during weekends. The south beach facing the Indian Ocean has clean and big waves, whereas north beach is very calm mostly used for commercial activities such as fishing and boat repair services.
