= Bank of Madura =

Defunct Indian bank

Bank of Madura was a Tamil Nadu-based bank established in 1943 by Karumuttu Thiagarajan Chettiar. It acquired Chettinad Mercantile Bank (est. 1933) and Illanji Bank (est. 1904) during the 1960s. The Bank of Madura was a Chettiar bank with a large customer base of over 2 million customers and a network of more than 280 branches and 40+ ATM centres spread across around 100 cities in India. The bank merged with ICICI Bank Limited, under Section 44A of the Banking Regulation Act, 1949, under the leadership of Chairman K.M. Thiagarajan. The Bank had roughly 44 billion INR in assets at the time of the merger, not accounting for inflation. The Reserve Bank of India approved the merger effective 10 March 2001. It was headquartered at Madurai.

The parties involved and news outlets alike described the merger as a positive strategic move. Bank of Madura shareholders approved the merger on 19 January 2001. Following the merger the Bank of Madura's share price initially rose sharply.

== See also ==
- Indian banking
- Economy of Tamil Nadu
