= Ramco Systems =

Indian IT Services company

Ramco Systems Limited

- Headquarters of Ramco Systems
- Type: Public
- Traded as: BSE: 532370; NSE: RAMCOSYS
- Industry: Enterprise software
- Founded: 1997
- Headquarters: Chennai, India
- Number of locations: 30 offices
- Key people: PR Venketrama Raja (Chairman); Abinav Raja (Managing Director); Sandesh Bilagi (CEO)
- Products: Global Payroll Software; Aviation Software; ERP; Logistics Software
- Revenue: US$61.79 million (2023 (March))
- Number of employees: 1801+
- Parent: Ramco Group
- Website: www.ramco.com

Ramco Systems Limited is an Indian multinational enterprise software product & platform provider. Founded in 1997, it is a part of the Ramco Group, and is headquartered in Chennai, India.

== History ==
Ramco Systems was founded in 1992 as the research and development division of Ramco Industries and began product development in 1993. It became a separate subsidiary in 1997. In the same year, the company released its ERP product, Marshal 3.0, which was launched by Bill Gates.

In 2002, Ramco Systems launched VirtualWorks, a web-based ERP product that automates software development.

In 2011, the company launched its SaaS ERP service for the aviation, aerospace and defense industries.

In 2014, Ramco Systems signed a deal with Norske Skog to provide Cloud enterprise resource planning (ERP) integrated with asset management and financials for its ANZ region.

In 2016, Ramco Systems opened an engineering lab in Singapore. The lab's first anchor partner was Air France Industries KLM Engineering & Maintenance, for whom it advanced aviation IT solutions, along with wearables for ground engineers and drones to inspect aircraft on the tarmac. With support from Singapore Economic Development Board (EDB).

In 2022, Ramco Systems established a new development center in Madurai, which was the company's first product development center outside of its headquarters in Chennai. In the same year, the company also opened a new subsidiary in the United States called Ramco Systems Defense and Security Incorporated (RSDSI). RSDSI is focused on the defense industry in the United States. Ramco Systems Defense has offices in Washington, D.C. and Dallas.

In 2023, Etihad Airways Engineering partnered with Ramco to implement Ramco's Aviation Suite V5.9.

Also in 2023, Ramco Systems inaugurated its wholly owned subsidiary in Qatar to work with the region's businesses on ERP, HR, and payroll software. In the same year, Ramco Systems appointed its current chief executive officer, Sundar Subramanian.

== Products and services ==
=== Global Payroll Software ===
Ramco Systems’ HR and payroll software includes artificial intelligence-based solutions for HR and payroll, such as its Self Explaining Payslip (SEP) system launched in 2021, which handles employee payroll queries using automated responses.

Ramco Systems also partnered with Microsoft to launch Ramco Global Payroll Software on Microsoft Dynamics 365 in 2018.

In 2021, Ramco Systems signed a partnership with the two largest HCM providers, Oracle and Workday. The partnership allowed Ramco to provide multi-country payroll to Workday's MNC client base. In the same year, it announced the launch of its Global Payroll solution on the Oracle Cloud Marketplace. In a collaborative effort, Ramco Systems has integrated its comprehensive payroll platform, with Oracle Fusion Cloud Human Capital Management (HCM).

In 2022, Ramco Systems formed a partnership with the Australian financial technology company Wagestream, which allowed employees to track their financial statistics through a single platform. In the same year, it also began implementing its payroll and HR solutions at Kudu Company for Food and Catering, a Saudi Arabian restaurant chain.

In February 2023, Ramco Systems launched Payce, a platform-based payroll software. In November 2023, Deloitte Touche Tohmatsu India LLP partnered with Ramco Systems to combine Ramco's payroll solution with Deloitte's advisory and managed services.

In January 2024, Ramco Systems partnered with BDO India LLP, a professional services organization in India to serve as the technology platform provider for BDO India’s payroll and managed services.

In August 2026, Ramco Systems implemented its Payce platform for Cromwell Property Group, supporting the company's payroll operations in Australia.

=== Aviation software ===
Ramco Systems provides aviation maintenance software for civil and defense clients.

Ramco Systems’ ERP products such as its Aviation ERP also make use of artificial intelligence and machine learning.

Its aviation software was also adopted by Iraqi Airways in the year 2021.

Ramco Systems began supplying version 5.9 of its aviation maintenance and engineering suite to General Atomics Aeronautical Systems for use in its SkyGuardian Global Support Solutions program in 2022.

In 2023, Etihad Airways announced that it would also be implementing Ramco Systems’ Aviation Suite V5.9 at the MRO Middle East conference. Philippine Airlines joined Etihad Airways in using Aviation Suite V5.9 in the same year. In the same year, they also signed a deal with Australian technology company Nova Systems to develop material resource planning (MRP) software for Nova Systems. In the same year, Ramco Systems entered a strategic partnership with Airbus Helicopters SAS to develop an MIS Data Pack Connector.

In April 2024, Korean Air announced that it was collaborating with Ramco Aviation to implement Ramco Aviation Suite at Korean Air’s Engine Maintenance Center.

In March 2026, Ramco Systems announced that the Tata Advanced Systems Limited (TASL) has selected its aviation MRO software for the MRO facility that is under construction to support the C-130J Super Hercules fleet of the Indian Air Force. The software will manage all aspects of the facility's operation, including contract and quote management, maintenance planning, hangar and component maintenance, supply chain management, engineering and quality, as well as customer billing.

=== ERP ===
Ramco Systems also develops enterprise resource planning software that allows users to manage functions such as supply chain/logistics planning, finance management, and human resources management.

=== Logistics Software ===
Ramco Systems’ logistics software includes cloud-based solutions for warehouse management and transportation, and fleet management for third party logistics and express parcel provider.

It also provides end-to-end services for 3PLs, e-commerce logistics providers, and other businesses that use analytics and artificial intelligence.

In 2023, Ramco Systems implemented its Logistics ERP Software at Freight Specialists, a freight and distribution services provider based in Sydney, Australia, to automate company-wide operations and services.

=== RAMCO CHIA ===
Ramco CHIA is a virtual assistant that uses artificial intelligence features such as deep learning and natural language processing for HR transactions.

=== RamcoGEEK ===
Ramco Systems has also released a facial attendance system called RamcoGEEK, which used facial recognition technology and temperature recording to create a "touch-less" workplace attendance for use during the COVID-19 pandemic.

=== Microsoft collaborations ===
Ramco Systems has partnered with Microsoft on products such as Ramco Global Payroll Software, which is integrated with Microsoft Dynamics 365 for Talent. It has also used Microsoft's cloud platform for its cloud computing and Microsoft's Cloud AI platform for artificial intelligence, such as Chia, Ramco Systems’ chatbot which uses Microsoft Luis.

== Locations ==
The company has locations in several countries, including: United States, China, Canada, Australia, Philippines, Indonesia, India and South America.

== See also ==
- List of ERP vendors
