= Bank of Chettinad =

Indian bank

Bank of Chettinad was a bank that originated in the Nattukottai Chettiar community.

== History ==
1929: Two prominent Nattukottai Chettiar business family partnerships established the bank with its head office in Rangoon. They registered it as a private company in India and incorporated it under the Indian Companies Act of 1913. One of the families, from Kanadukathan, ran the firm. It was involved in many activities and was also closely associated with the Chettinad Corporation. In particular, it borrowed from Chartered Bank, Imperial Bank of India, First National City Bank, and Lloyds Bank for on-lending to Chettiar moneylenders. In 1932 it started an office in Colombo.

In 1942, the Japanese Military Authority created the Peoples Bank of Burma as a joint venture between it, the Burma Executive Authority (the Burmese puppet regime), and the Yokohama Specie Bank. Bank of Chettinad at the time was Burma's largest bank, the Peoples Bank of Burma took over Bank of Chettinad's 45 branches, and established its own head office in the former Burmese headquarters of Central Bank of India. In 1946: The Supreme Court of Ceylon ruled that the Bank of Chettinad was not a bank in that it primarily made loans on promissory notes and mortgages and did not take deposits. In 1963: The Burmese government nationalized all foreign banks and essentially drove out the large population of people of Indian origin, among whom there were many Chettiars. Bank of Chettinad by then was no longer operating under that name and was not among the 24 foreign banks that the government nationalized. 1965: Bank of Chettinad was voluntarily wound up.

== See also ==
- Indian banking

== Citations and references ==
Citations

References

- Turnell, Sean (2009) Fiery Dragons: Banks, Moneylenders and Microfinnance in Burma. (NAIS Press). ISBN 9788776940409
- Weerasooria, W. S. 1973. The Nattukottai Chettiar Merchant Bankers in Ceylon.(Delhiwala, Sri Lanka: Tisara Prakasakayo).
