= Repco Bank =

Cooperative bank in India

- Founded: 19 November 1969; 56 years ago in Mylapore, India
- Headquarters: T. Nagar, Chennai, India
- Area served: South India
- Website: www.repcobank.com

Repco Bank (Repatriates Cooperative and Finance and Development Bank) is a cooperative bank established by the Government of India in 1969 to improve financial needs of repatriates from neighbouring countries mainly from Sri Lanka and Burma. It has been controlled by the Ministry of Home Affairs and operated only in the South Indian states of Andhra Pradesh, Karnataka, Kerala and Tamil Nadu. As of 2014, the shares of the bank are Government of India has 73.33%, repatriates has 21.28% and state governments Tamil Nadu has 2.91%, Andhra Pradesh has 1.73%, Kerala has 0.59% and Karanataka has 0.17%.

== Subsidiaries ==
- Repco Home Finance limited (RHFL)
- Repco Micro Finance Limited (RMFL)
