= TNSC Bank =

Indian co-operative banking company

- Type: Cooperative
- Industry: Banking
- Founded: 23 November 1905; 120 years ago
- Headquarters: Chennai, Tamil Nadu, India
- Area served: Chennai, Tamil Nadu, India
- Key people: R. Elangovan (Chairman); M. Antonysamy John Peter (Managing Director)
- Number of employees: 558 (2012)
- Website: www.tnsc.bank.in

The Tamil Nadu State Apex Co-operative Bank (TNSC Bank) is an Indian cooperative banking company headquartered in Chennai. It was incorporated in 1905 as an urban cooperative bank. As of 2015, TNSC Bank had 51 branches in Chennai. TNSC Bank coordinates India's entire short-term cooperative credit structure.

TNSC Bank is India's first state cooperative bank. TNSC Bank received a license of the Reserve Bank of India to offer banking services. TNSC Bank is a Scheduled Co-operative Bank, listed under the Second Schedule of RBI Act. TNSC Bank is a member of the Deposit Insurance and Credit Guarantee Corporation (DICGC) and is an insured cooperative bank as per the DICGC Act. TNSC Bank's capital is shared by the Government of Tamil Nadu.

== History ==
TNSC Bank was formed in the same year as the cooperative movement of Tamil Nadu began, in November 1905. The bank commenced its business the year following the formation of the coop. It subsequently changed into a District Central Cooperative Bank in July 1920.

During 1930 and 1931, the bank embarked on a scheme for rectification and consolidation of Primary Societies through the Central Coop. During its first 25 years, TNSC lent to primary societies and Central Coop. The Tamil Nadu government became a bank shareholder on 27 March 1957 and was represented on the Board, according to the recommendations of the All India Rural Credit Survey Committee of the Reserve Bank of India. The name of this Bank changed along with the state name to “The Tamil Nadu State Co-operative Bank Ltd.”

Presently, the NCDC, TNSC Bank is open and functioning as a training institute in a rental building in Adyar since arriving in 1989.

The Government of Tamil Nadu invested ₹20.26 crore in the ordinary share capital of TNSC.

== Services ==
TNSC Bank offers savings accounts, current accounts, deposits including fixed, recurrent, cash certificate, loans for individuals (including home loans, jewel loans, housing loans, computer loans, educational loans), corporate banking services and rural banking services. It also offers electronic services including net banking and e-payment of bills.

=== Alliance with Murugappa Group ===
Cholamandalam MS, General Insurance Co. Ltd. (Chola MS), a joint venture between ₹15,646 crores (US$3 billion) Murugappa Group and Mitsui Sumitomo Insurance Group of Japan, announced a bancassurance tie-up with TNSC Bank in October 2009 for two of its District Co-operative Banks working in rural areas of Tamil Nadu. Through this alliance, Cholamandalam MS can tap the Deposit and Loan base of Dharmapuri District Central Co-operative Bank and Salem District Central Co-operative Bank covering four districts of Dharmapuri, Krishnagiri, Salem, and Namakkal for a period of 3 years.

== Financial status ==
(Rs. in Crores)
| PARTICULARS | 31.3.2018 | 31.3.2019 | 31.3.2020 |
|---|---|---|---|
| Paid-Up Share Capital | 312.03 | 328.49 | 346.78 |
| Statutory Reserves | 267.68 | 267.68 | 267.68 |
| Other Reserves | 330.33 | 340.43 | 351.97 |
| Deposits | 8305.54 | 8384.60 | 11081.93 |
| Borrowings | 2844.20 | 3222.90 | 4199.40 |
| Investments | 3234.32 | 2987.61 | 2970.87 |
| Advances | 6372.10 | 8062.64 | 10526.67 |
| Working Funds | 13504.88 | 14038.44 | 17965.68 |
| Net Profit | 81.83 | 81.87 | 82.15 |

== Awards ==
- Overall Best Performance award - six times between 1985 and 2018, most recently for 2012–2013
- All India Mutual Arrangement Scheme - eight times, most recently for 2011–2012.
- Excellent Facilitation of Technology Adoption by the Cooperative Banking System in Tamil Nadu award in 2017 from NABARD.
