= Automotive industry in Chennai =

Chennai is nicknamed the "Detroit of Asia" due to the presence of major automobile manufacturing units and allied industries around the city.

A number of motor companies, including BMW, Royal Enfield, Hyundai, Renault-Nissan, Citroen, Caparo Group, Komatsu, Caterpillar, Ashok Leyland, and TVS, have facilities along the 60 km automotive corridor. Oragadam is regarded as the epicenter of this corridor, which contains the National Automobile Testing and R&D Infrastructure Project (NATRIP). The corridor is served by three major ports, Chennai Port, Kattupalli Shipyard and Kamarajar Port.

The 4-wheeler vehicles in Chennai is the base of 30% of India's automobile industry and 35% of its automobile component industry. Besides the commercial industry, the Heavy Vehicles Factory (HVF) has been established in Avadi to produce military related vehicles. Avadi also has the Combat Vehicles Research and Development Establishment (CVRDE), with an engine-testing facility.

== Automotive manufacturers ==
Company	Location	Capacity	Products
Ashok Leyland	Chennai port		Buses, haulage vehicles, special application vehicles, diesel engines
BMW	Mahindra World City, New Chennai		BMW 3 Series, BMW 5 Series, BMW 7 series, BMW X1, BMW X3, Mini Cooper
Caterpillar	Thiruvallur		Off Highway Trucks, HEX, Back-Hoe Loader, Skid Steer Loader
Daimler	Oragadam	36,000	BharatBenz trucks and buses
Ford	Maraimalai Nagar	200,000	
Mahindra & Mahindra	Mahindra World City		Research and development for automotive and farm sector
Force Motors	Mahindra World City		Engines for BMW
Hindustan Motors	Tiruvallur		Trekker (discontinued), Landmaster (discontinued), Contessa (discontinued), Ambassador (discontinued)
Hyundai	Irungattukottai	600,000	Aura, Elantra, Grand i10 Nios, i20, Verna, Exter, Venue, Creta, Alcazar, Tucson, Creta Electric, Ioniq 5
Mitsubishi	Tiruvallur	12,000	
Stellantis	Chennai One SEZ, OMR		Research & Development, Programs & Projects, Global Purchasing Hub, Supply Chain, Process & Manufacturing Engineering, Quality, KD Excellence Center & Product
Citroën India	Tiruvallur		C5 Aircross, C3, ë-C3, Aircross, Basalt
Renault Nissan Automotive India	Oragadam	200,000	Kwid, Triber, Kiger, Magnite
Royal Enfield	Tiruvottiyur	1,200,000	Classic, Bullet, Hunter 350, Scram 440, Goan Classic 350, Meteor, Super Meteor 650, Himalayan, Guerrilla 650, Shotgun 650, Bear 650, Interceptor 650, Continental GT 650.
Royal Enfield	Oragadam		Classic, Bullet, Hunter 350, Scram 440, Goan Classic 350, Meteor, Super Meteor 650, Himalayan, Guerrilla 650, Shotgun 650, Bear 650, Interceptor 650, Continental GT 650.
Royal Enfield	Vallam		Classic, Bullet, Hunter 350, Scram 440, Goan Classic 350, Meteor, Super Meteor 650, Himalayan, Guerrilla 650, Shotgun 650, Bear 650, Interceptor 650, Continental GT 650.
TAFE Tractors	Sembium		Tractors
Valeo	Vallam	500,000	wiper motor manufacturing facility
Yamaha	Vallam Vadakkal	450,000	Bikes
CNH Industrial (India) Pvt. Ltd - (New Holland Tractors)	Porur	450,000	Tractors

== Tyre manufacturers ==
Company	Plant Locations
Yokohama	Gangaikondan
Apollo Tyres	Oragadam
Bridgestone	Oragadam
CEAT	Sriperumbudur
JK Tyres	Sriperumbudur
Michelin	Thervoy Kandigai
MRF	Arakkonam, Tiruvottiyur

== Auto-components manufacturers ==
The following auto component companies have their manufacturing plants in and around Chennai:

- Avalon Technologies
- Ashley Alteams
- Bavina Industries
- Bharat Forge
- BorgWarner
- Brakes India
- Brembo
- Caterpillar
- Aptiv
- Ennore Foundries
- Forvia
- Federal-Mogul
- Design Edge Technologies
- Hidromas
- India Pistons
- ILJIN Automotives
- Iochpe Maxion
- JKM Daerim
- Hella
- Hyundai WIA
- Hyundai Mobis
- Korea Fuel Tech
- Lear Corporation
- Leo Primecomp
- Machino
- Mahindra Accelo Ltd.
- HL Mando
- Samvardhana Motherson
- Rane
- SEW Eurodrive
- Simpson & Co.
- Sona Comstar
- TVS Holdings
- ZF Friedrichshafen
- Takata
- Tube Investments of India Limited
- Tube Products of India
- TVS Motor Company
- Valeo
- Visteon
- Wheels India
- YAPP Automotive Systems

== Automotive Corridor ==
The Automotive Corridor, is a 60 km long corridor in Chennai, India. This corridor alone accounts for 33% of commercial vehicles, 21% of all passenger cars, and 35% of auto components produced in the country. The corridor stretches from Gummidipoondi, 50 km north of Chennai to Maraimalai Nagar 35 km south of Chennai and passes through Tiruvallur, Sriperumbudur and Oragadam. It is estimated that a part of this corridor from Tiruvallur to Maraimalai Nagar alone, by 2012, would produce around 1.25 million cars, 35,000 commercial vehicles and other automotives per year.

== Tyre manufacturing ==
Major tyre manufacturing companies alone have committed investments around $4 billion in Tamil Nadu of which 90% has been invested in the Automotive Corridor. A number of tyre manufacturing companies have set up factories in this corridor and are as follows.

Company	Plant Locations	Investments (crores of INR)
Alliance Tire Company	Gangaikondan	
Apollo Tyres	Oragadam	2600
Bridgestone	Thervoy Kandigai	
CEAT	Sriperumbudur	
Dunlop	Ambattur	
JK Tyres	Sriperumbudur	1600
Michelin	Thervoy Kandigai	11000 (4000 in Phase I till 2016)
MRF	Arakkonam, Tiruvottiyur (2 plants)	1400

== See also ==
- Automotive industry in India
- Rajiv Gandhi Salai
- EMS Corridor
- SEZ Corridor
