= SEZ Corridor =

High-technology business district in Chennai

The SEZ Corridor is an emerging corridor implementing a number of Special Economic Zones (SEZs) along the Grand Southern Trunk Road (NH 45) in Chennai. Started with the establishment of the Madras Export Processing Zone in 1984 (converted to a SEZ in 2003), the SEZ corridor currently has 5 operational SEZs and over 10 approved projects in development. The GST Road is widely made use of for SEZ projects due to its connectivity with various means of transport by road, rail and air. This is evident by the presence of the Chennai International Airport, various railway stations parallel to the road, and also its connectivity to the complex road network of the National Highways Authority of India.

== SEZs ==
A number of SEZ projects has emerged in this stretch, making it the SEZ corridor of Chennai. It includes MEPZ SEZ established in 1984, Mahindra World City, New Chennai, Shriram Properties's Gateway SEZ, Estancia SEZ and ETL Infrastructure.

It is also emerging as a major IT SEZ region with a number of huge investments by Infosys. Infosys has set up its largest development center in Mahindra SEZ while India Land Tech Park is developing a massive 500-acre (2.0 km^{2}) SEZ which is estimated to have 20,900,000 sq ft (1,940,000 m^{2}) office space for both IT and Electronics use. Shriram The Gateway SEZ, is an integrated township with IT/ITeS SEZ residential and mall, which is also home for IT majors like Accenture, ReDIM Information Systems and EISL is an IT/ITES SEZ by ETL Infrastructure at Chengalpattu on 260 acres (1.1 km^{2}).

== See also ==
- Rajiv Gandhi Salai
- Automotive Corridor
- Electronics Corridor
- Special Economic Zone
- Free trade zone
- List of SEZs in India
