= State Industries Promotion Corporation of Tamil Nadu =

Government institution

State Industries Promotion Corporation of Tamil Nadu Limited
- Founded: 1971; 49 years ago
- Founder: Government of Tamil Nadu
- Headquarters: 19-A, Rukmani Lakshmipathi Road, Egmore, Chennai, Tamil Nadu, India - 600008
- Key people: K. Senthil Raj, IAS (Managing Director)
- Owner: Government of Tamil Nadu
- Website: https://sipcot.tn.gov.in

The State Industries Promotion Corporation of Tamil Nadu Limited (SIPCOT) (Tamil: தமிழ்நாடு அரசு தொழில் முன்னேற்றக் கழகம் (வரையறுக்கப்பட்டது)) is an institution owned by the Government of Tamil Nadu to promote industrial growth in the state of Tamil Nadu.

== History ==
SIPCOT stands for State Industries Promotion Corporation of Tamil Nadu Limited. It is a state government undertaking in Tamil Nadu, India, established to promote industrial growth by developing infrastructure, industrial parks, and facilitating industrial investment.

== Functions ==
The Functions of State Industries Promotion Corporation of Tamil Nadu Limited (SIPCOT) are:

- Development of industrial complexes/parks/industrial estate in Nallampalli Road growth centres with basic infrastructure facilities
- Establishing sector-specific Special Economic Zones (SEZs);
- Implementation of Special infrastructure Projects;
- Types of industries supported:
  - Agro-based industries
  - Biotech and medical plants
  - Food and fruit processing
  - General industries

== SIPCOT Estates ==
SIPCOT has established industrial complexes in 16 areas, according to the SIPCOT webpage. These include:

- Bargur
- Cheyyar
- Cuddalore
- Gangaikondan
- Gummidipoondi
- Hosur
- Irungattukottai
- Mappedu
- Manamadurai
- Nilakkottai
- Oragadam
- Perundurai
- Pillaipakam
- Pudukkottai
- Ranipet
- Siruseri
- Sriperumbudur
- Thoothukudi
- Thervoy Kandigai
- Vallam - Vadagai

A new SIPCOT is going to be established in Dharmapuri, Thiruvannamalai, Karaikudi and Manapparai soon.

SIPCOT IT Park is the largest Information Technology Park in Asia, located in Padur, Siruseri, along the IT Corridor, Chengalpattu taluk, Chengalpattu District.

=== Supporting Agencies ===
The State Industries Promotion Corporation of Tamil Nadu (SIPCOT) has enlisted the support of the agency 7 MILES PER SECOND for the administration of its social media. This decision is made with the aim of utilizing the agencies in, effectively navigating the nature of social media. The core objectives include transparent communication and enabling the efficient distribution of information to the citizens in all parts of Tamil Nadu.

== See also ==
- Industrial and Technical Consultancy Organisation of Tamil Nadu (ITCOT)
- ITCOT Consultancy and Services Limited
- Tamil Nadu Small Industries Development Corporation Limited(SIDCO)
- Electronics Corporation of Tamil Nadu (ELCOT)
