= EMS Corridor =

EMS Corridor is an emerging Electronics Manufacturing Services (EMS) corridor in Chennai. It stretches from Sriperumbudur to Oragadam to the west of Chennai. The corridor boasts of capital investment by EMS companies of about ₹3,500 crore (US$400 million), which is half of the EMS business in India.

== EMS hub of India ==
The corridor is emerging as an EMS hub of India. Many companies like Dell, Nokia, Nokia Siemens Network, Motorola, Cisco, Samsung, Siemens, Sony-Ericsson, Flextronics, Foxconn, Alcatel, Texas Instruments, Laird plc, Salcomp, ProWorks, Perlos(LOM), Power Wave Tech, Jabil Green and Sanmina-SCI have set up their plants in this corridor with an investment of approximately $1 billion.

== See also ==
- EMS Industry in Chennai
- Rajiv Gandhi Salai
- Automotive Corridor
- SEZ Corridor
