= Bollineni Hillside =

Township in Chennai Metropolitan Area, Tamil Nadu, India

- city
- Location in Tamil Nadu, India
- Coordinates: 12.88034°N 80.20238°E
- Country: India
- State: Tamil Nadu
- District: Chengalpattu

Languages
  - Official: Tamil
- Time zone: UTC+5:30 (IST)
- PIN: 600126
- Website: www.bollinenihillside.com

Bollineni Hillside is an integrated township spread across 100 acres on Rajiv Gandhi Salai, also called OMR (Old Mahabalipuram Road). It comprises a range of row houses and villas.

Bollineni Hillside will have dwelling space of approximately six million sft. after completion. It will accommodate about 4500 dwelling units suiting the requirements of different income groups.

== Location of Bollineni Hillside ==
Bollineni Hillside is located off Rajiv Gandhi Salai i.e. OMR (Old Mahabalipuram Road), at Nookampalayam Panchayat. The closest landmark is Sathyabhama University.
