= Kelambakkam =

Kelambakkam, Chennai
- Suburb of Chennai
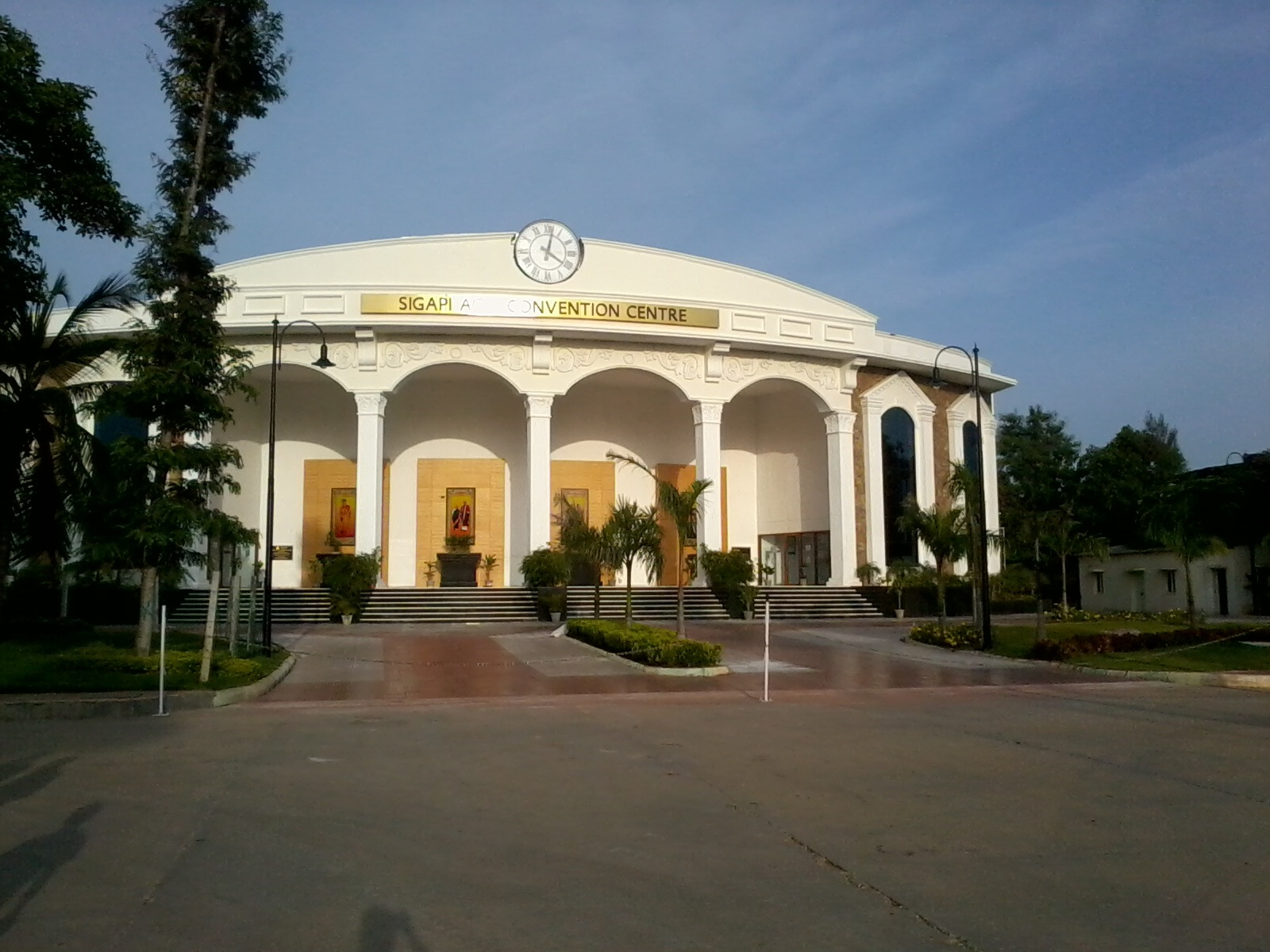
- Sigapiachi Convention Centre
- Interactive map of Kelambakkam, Chennai
- Coordinates: 12.48°N 80.13°E
- Country: India
- State: Tamil Nadu
- Metro: Chennai
- District: Chengalpattu
- Time zone: UTC+5:30 (IST)
- Postal code: 603103

Kelambakkam is a suburban and residential neighbourhood of Chennai, in Chengalpattu district of Tamil Nadu, India. It is located in the south-eastern portion of the city along the Old Mahabalipuram Road (OMR), and is about 5 km from Siruseri IT park and 12 km from Sholinganallur junction. It is another important junction after Sholinganalur, which connects GST road (Vandalur) and ECR road (Kovalam). Kelambakkam is considered as the Southern Gateway to Chennai city on OMR Road and comes under Zone-2 (Sholinganalur to Kelambakkam stretch) of OMR Road.

Metro Train project-Phase 2 is under process which connects Madhavaram with Siruseri IT park (Deadline to be operational for this Corridor-3 by 2025).

== Census 2011 ==
The total population of Kelambakkam is around 20,000 and expected to be scaled up every year. The literacy rate of this locality is 90.88%. The sex ratio in Kelambakkam is 1,018. More families are migrating to Kelambakkam due to huge residential and commercial development, good ground water availability and easy accessibility to all parts of Chennai city with excellent road infrastructure. According to recent survey, Chennai city will have a population of 15 million people by 2030 (current population in 2023 is 12 million). Since population has already reached saturation point till Sholinganallur in OMR Road, more people (around 10 lakh people) will start migrating in Sholinganallur–Kelambakkam stretch till 2030.

== Schools in Kelambakkam ==
- St. Francis International School
- DAV Group of School (SM Fomra)
- Chettinad - Sarvalokaa Education International School
- Velammal New Gen CBSE School
- Little Millennium Preschool Kelambakkam
- Jagannath Vidyalaya CBSE School
- Billabong High International School
- Buvana Krishnan Matriculation Higher Secondary School
- St Mary's Matriculation Higher Secondary School
- Ilanthalir Kids Zone Preschool
- Kidzee Kelambakkam Play, Nursery School
- Government Higher Secondary School
- Nellai Math Institute (A Mathematics School in Kelambakkam)

== Colleges nearby Kelambakkam ==
- IIT Madras- Scientific Discovery campus- PM Narendra Modi laid the foundation stone in 2021 for constructing a campus at a cost of Rs.1,000 crores (State government has given 163 acres of land in Thaiyur at 2017).
- VIT University
- SSN University(250 acre campus)
- Hindustan Institute of Technology & Science
- Chettinad School of Architecture
- IIITDM Kancheepuram (Indian Institute of Information Technology, Design and Manufacturing, Kancheepuram)
- Chettinad Academy of Research & Education (Deemed to be university under section 3 of the UGC Act)
- Chettinad college of Nursing
- Chettinad Hospital and Research Institute
- Dhanapalan College of Arts & Science
- SMK Fomra Institute of Technology
- Anand Institute of Technology
- PSB polytechnic college
- Tagore Medical college and Hospital

== Hospitals ==
- Chettinad Super Speciality Hospital (100-acre campus)
- Praveena Hospital, Vandalur Road, Kelambakkam
- Swaram Hospital
- Supreme Hospitals
- Apollo Diagnostics
- Malar Diagnostics Centre (Since 2003)
- Dr. Agarwal's Eye Hospital at Padur, Kelambakkam

== Temples and Churches around Kelambakkam ==
- Sai Baba Temple, Kelambakkam
- Poorana Brahmam Temple, Sri RamaRajya Campus, Vandalur Road, Kelambakkam
- Sri Ashta Dasa Buja Durga Lakshmi Saraswathi Temple, Sri RamaRajya Campus, Vandalur Road, Kelambakkam
- Sri Karpaga Vinayakar Temple, Ganeshpuri, Sri RamaRajya Campus, Kelambakkam
- Veera Anjaneyar Temple, Pudupakkam
- Nithyakalyana Perumal temple, Thiruvidanthai beach temple (one of the 108 Divyadesas of Lord Perumal)
- Thiruporur Murugan Temple
- Chengammal Sivan Temple
- Mareeswarar Temple (Thaiyur)
- Christ the Redeemer Catholic Church
- Divine Mercy Church
- Usmaniya Jamiya Masjid And Islamic Center (one of the oldest masjid in OMR road)
- Masjid ul huda (near Market)

== Residential development ==
Due to rapid development, water availability and road infrastructure with accessibility to all parts of Chennai, apartments and villas have been built in Kelambakkam. Also, Kelambakkam has witnessed family migration in the past few years. Proximity to employment opportunities, good asset appreciation, good road Infrastructure, proximity to beaches at ECR and other entertainment venues continues to attract more residents to this suburb.

== Transport ==
Kelambakkam is well connected to almost all important destinations in Chennai city like T.Nagar, CMBT, Broadway, Central Railway station, Tambaram through frequent MTC bus services. New bus depot for Kelambakkam (Thaiyur) about 10 acres land is allotted for MTC bus shelter and also for new Kelambakkam bus terminus. On an average, MTC operates more than 400 bus services from Kelambakkam to all localities of Chennai city.

Also, Tamil Nadu government constructed Biggest Bus Terminus (45 acres) at cost of Rs 410 crore in Vandalur which takes just 20 minutes to reach through Vandalur-Kelambakkam road. This KMBT bus terminus will be largest bus terminus in Asia and became operational from 2023. All south bound buses has been shifted from CMBT to KMBT(Kalaignar Mofusil Bus Terminus).

Due to ever growing traffic in and around Kelambakkam, TNRDC constructed Kelamabakkam By-pass road which further improved road infrastructure and development of this region.

Metro Train project- Phase 2 is under process which connects Madhavaram with Siruseri IT park(Deadline to be operational for this Corridor-3 by 2027). Once Metro train is operational, it will be game changer for overall development in OMR road.

== See also ==
- Chennai
- Covelong Beach
- Mamallapuram
