= Daimler India Commercial Vehicles =

Indian subsidiary of Daimler Truck AG

Daimler India Commercial Vehicles Pvt. Ltd.
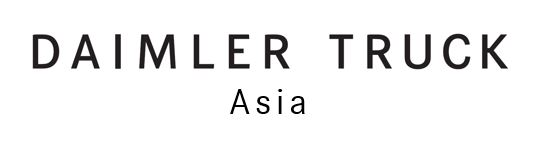
- Type: Subsidiary
- Industry: Automotive
- Headquarters: Chennai, India
- Key people: Torsten Schmidt (CEO)
- Products: Commercial vehicles Trucks; Buses
- Brands: BharatBenz, Mercedez-Benz, Freightliner
- Revenue: ▼₹10,431 crore (US$1.1 billion) (2025)
- Net income: ▼₹169 crore (US$18 million) (2025)
- Owner: Daimler Truck AG
- Number of employees: 3,000+
- Website: dicv.daimlertruck.com

Daimler India Commercial Vehicles Pvt. Ltd. is a subsidiary of the German Daimler Truck AG. This company designs, manufactures, and sells commercial vehicles that cater to the demands of Indian customers and are designed with nation's terrain in mind. These vehicles are branded as "BharatBenz", "Mercedes-Benz" and "Fuso".

After starting production in June 2012, the first heavy-duty truck was launched in September 2012. The corporate office is located in Sholinganallur, Chennai, and the plant is located at Oragadam, Kanchipuram District, Tamil Nadu. The current chief executive officer is Torsten Schmidt.

== History ==
Daimler AG has been active in the commercial vehicle business in India for decades. In 1954, the first truck made for the Indian market was a Mercedes-Benz, after Daimler-Benz granted a license for automobile production to the Tata Group. A year prior, Daimler-Benz acquired an equity interest in Tata. In 1970, Daimler-Benz and Tata entered into a licensing agreement. In addition, Daimler had licensed various products to other Indian manufacturers (e.g., Force Traveller).

In 1994, Daimler entered the Indian market and set up Mercedes-Benz India with its headquarters in Pune. Mercedes-Benz India is also a subsidiary of Daimler AG and is responsible for the manufacture of passenger cars and bus chassis, along with the sales and service network.

In 2007, Daimler introduced its heavy-duty Mercedes-Benz Actros to the Indian market, which is used primarily in mining operations.

In order to produce light, medium, and heavy-duty trucks for the Indian market, Daimler Trucks entered a joint venture with the Indian automobile group Hero. After receiving official approval from the Indian government in March 2008, Daimler Hero Motor Corporation Ltd. was established. As a result of the economic situation from late 2008 to mid-2009, Daimler AG and Hero Group announced on 15 April 2009 the dissolution of Daimler Hero Commercial Vehicles Ltd. in India. In 2008, Daimler AG, Germany created a new wholly owned Indian subsidiary, Daimler India Commercial Vehicles (DICV) Pvt. Ltd.

They produce vehicles under the brand name BharatBenz. Three new trucks were launched on 26 September 2012. These include the 2523 R (a 25 tonne heavy-duty rigid truck), 2523 C (a 25 tonne heavy-duty tipper truck) and the 3123 R (a 31 tonne heavy-duty rigid truck). With the launch of the first three heavy-duty models in September 2012 (2523R, 2523C & 3123C), BharatBenz began its offering of a range of trucks. Subsequently, BharatBenz launched its range of medium-duty trucks in February 2013, and its range of Made-in-India trucks for export markets under the Fuso brand in May 2013. Later that year, two more heavy-duty trucks (2528 & 3128) were also launched. In February 2014, DICV launched four new BharatBenz models (three tractor and one construction-mining).

In Bangalore, Daimler set up its largest research and development location outside of Germany, Mercedes-Benz Research & Development India Pvt. Ltd. In addition to conducting simulations of mechanical structures, the center develops software and designs vehicle components.

== Facilities ==
The company's headquarters is based in Chennai, Tamil Nadu. The corporate office is situated at RMZ Millenia Business Park, Perungudi, a suburb of Chennai, with all other functions—Research & Development, Human Resources, Finance & Controlling, Marketing, Sales & After Sales, Product Planning, Operations and Quality Management—operating from its plant at Oragadam, near Chennai.

The production plant at Oragadam, is spread over 400 acres (160 hectares) and was inaugurated on 18 April 2012. The plant hosts a full production facility including body shop, paint and assembly as well as logistics. The company also has its own 6 km test-track that simulates Indian conditions.

Before the launch of BharatBenz trucks in India in 2012, Daimler Trucks were available in India with the Mercedes-Benz Actros trucks, which were earlier assembled at the Mercedes-Benz India plant at Chakan, Pune. The Mercedes-Benz Actros trucks are now assembled at DICV's Oragadam plant.

Since the launch of the first BharatBenz dealership in Chennai in August 2012, it has established a network of 75 outlets, and has plans to cover more than a 100 locations by early 2015.

== Brands ==
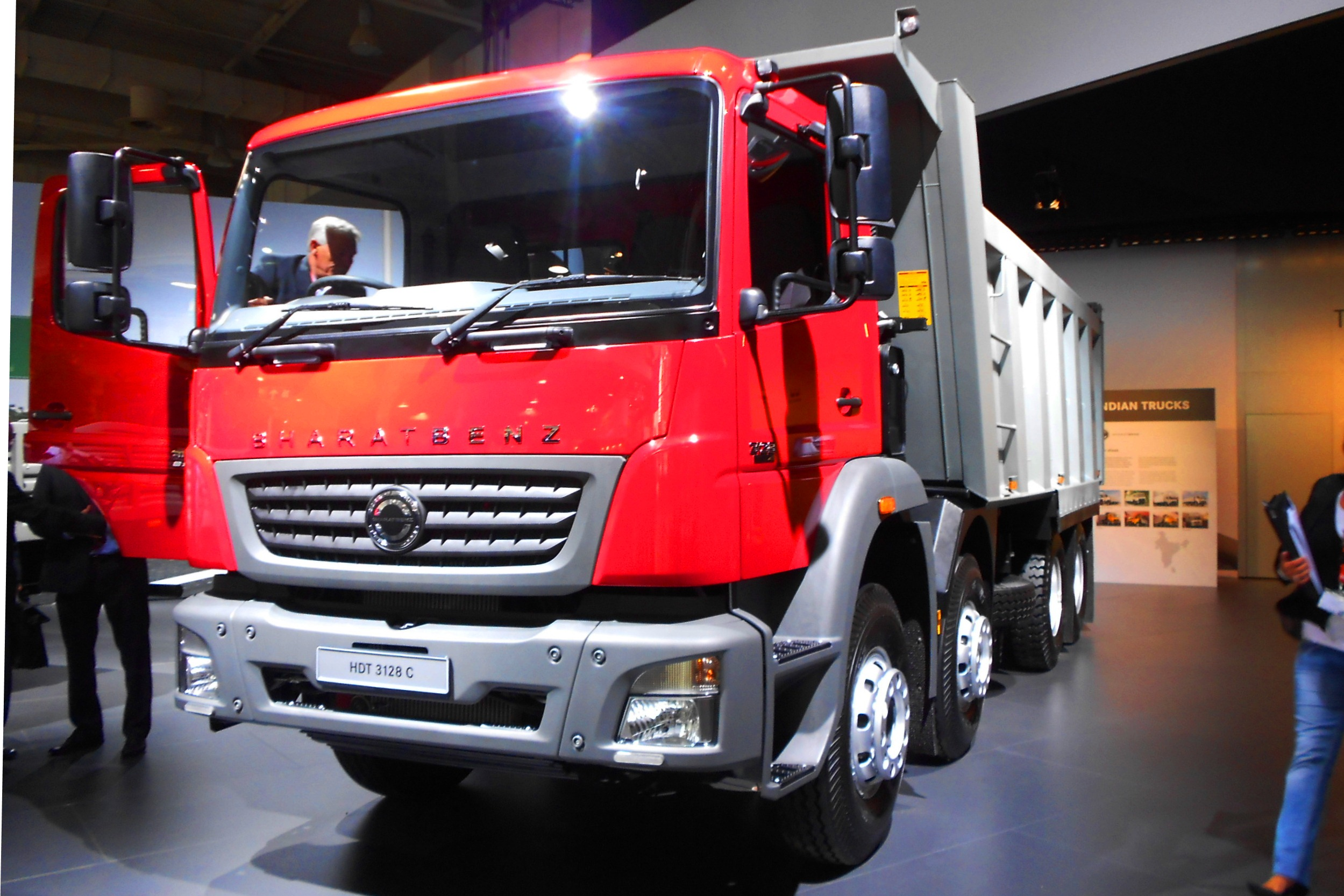
BharatBenz HDT 3128 C (heavy-duty truck)

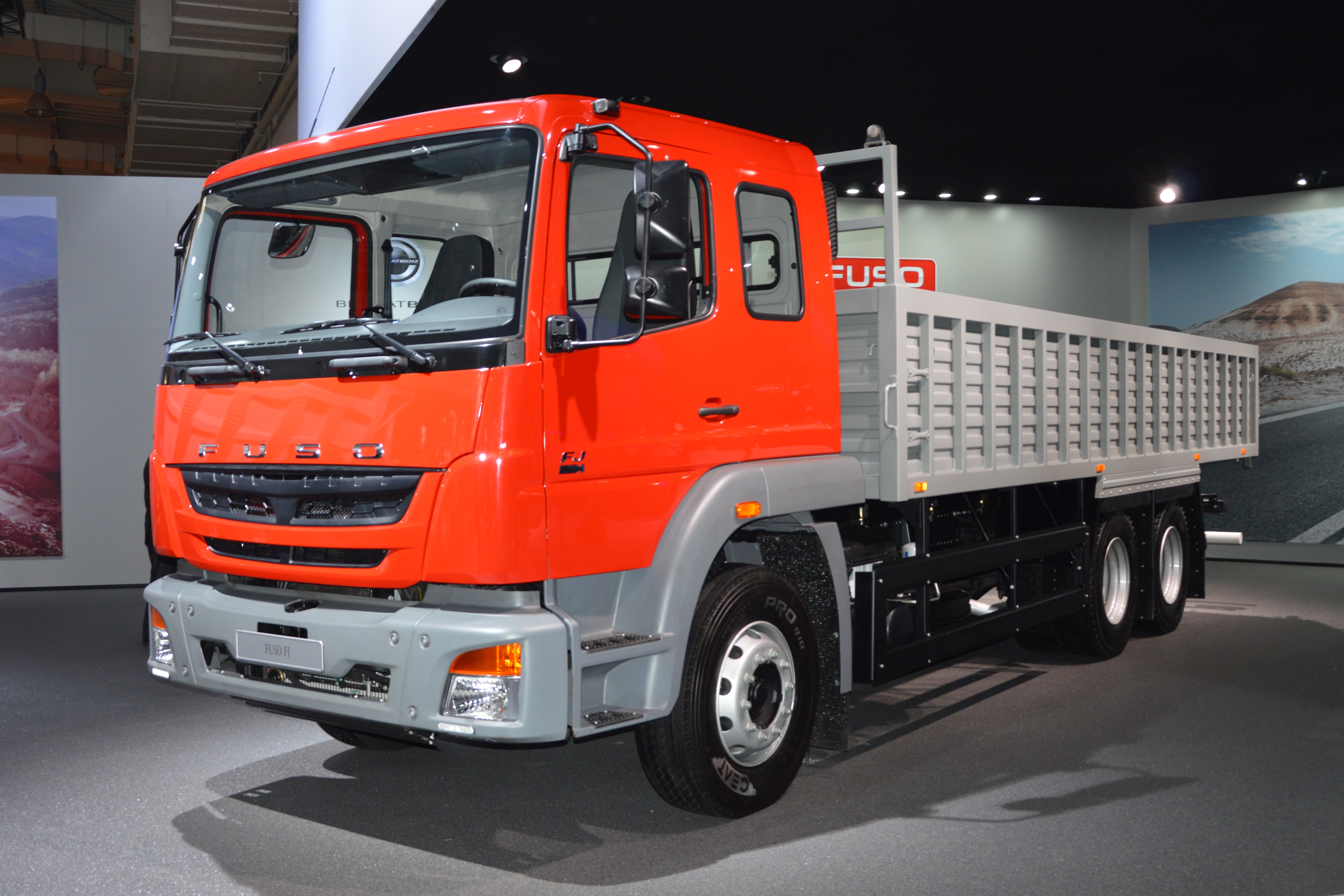
Fuso FJ rigid truck at the International Motor Show 2014 in Hanover, Germany

Daimler unveiled a new brand of trucks, BharatBenz, for the Indian market on 17 February 2011. The brand was intended to offer a range of trucks in the 6–49 ton range, with vehicles for applications such as haulage, tippers and tractor trailers. In 2012, BharatBenz unveiled its first range of trucks to the media, potential customers and partners in a six-day event in Hyderabad. The BharatBenz range of trucks includes Light Duty Trucks (LDT) and Heavy Duty Trucks (HDT) in the 9, 12, 25, 31 and 49 tonne categories. The first three HDTs (2523 R, 2523 C, & 3123 R) were launched on 26 September 2012. On 20 February 2013, DICV launched its Light/Medium-duty range of trucks. These trucks are based on the famous FUSO platforms.

Daimler's bus division launched its Mercedes-Benz inter-city luxury coaches in India in 2008. The initial entry into the Indian market was achieved through DICV's sister-concern, Mercedes-Benz India Pvt. Ltd. However, the establishment of DICV resulted in the transfer of Daimler Buses, India to DICV. The integration of Daimler Buses, India into DICV took place on 1 April 2013. In March 2014, DICV laid the foundation stone for its new bus plant at its Oragadam facility with an earmarked investment of INR 425 crores. The bus plant manufactures BharatBenz and Mercedes-Benz range of buses.
