= Oragadam =

- town
- Location in Tamil Nadu, India
- Coordinates: 12.8439°N 79.9481°E
- Country: India
- State: Tamil Nadu
- District: Kancheepuram
- Metropolitan area: Chennai
- Elevation: 46 m (151 ft)

Languages
  - Official: Tamil
- Time zone: UTC+5:30 (IST)
- PIN: 602118
- Vehicle registration: TN-11

Oragadam (Tamil: [oɾaɡaɖam]) is an industrial suburb of Chennai, India. It is located 55 km (34 mi) southwest from the city center and is centrally located between Grand Southern Trunk Road (NH 45) and NH 4. The locality, known as the biggest automobile hub in South Asia, is one of the fastest-growing suburbs of Chennai and is evolving into a multi-faceted industrial zone. Oragadam is a part of the Chennai Metropolitan Area.

== Economy ==
Oragadam has been touted as Chennai's largest and the most developed industrial belt. With over 22 Fortune 500 companies (of which six are global car manufacturers), the Sriperumbudur–Oragadam belt has seen tremendous industrial growth in less than 4 years. The area is well-connected via road and rail, and according to industrial experts, the presence of automobile giants like Renault-Nissan, Royal Enfield and Ford has triggered growth around Oragadam. Several manufacturing giants such as Motorola, Dell, Flextronics, Samsung, Apollo Tyres, and TVS Electronics, Yamaha have set up their respective units in the industrial belt stretching from Sriperumbudur to Oragadam. In addition, JCBL Ltd, Essar Steel, BPCL, Delphi TVS Diesel Systems Ltd, GE Bayer, Silicons (India) Pvt Ltd have also set up their businesses in SIPCOT Industrial Park, Oragadam. DHL is also reported to be setting up its first Free Trade Warehousing Zone at Sriperumbudur.

The town is known for its various industries and workshops pertaining to the automobile sector. Oragadam along with Sriperumbudur has seen major investments from foreign companies in recent times. Oragadam will soon become one of the largest Automobile hubs in the world. International Automobile majors like Daimler AG, Renault–Nissan, Komatsu have set up their car manufacturing plants here and will use it as a base for sourcing for their international markets, apart from supplying to meet the fast-growing Indian market. One of the otiose Clubs "The Chennai Corporate Club" is also located nearby.

The Tamil Nadu government is building the Rs. 300 crores Oragadam Industrial Corridor Road. The project, executed by the Tamil Nadu Road Infrastructure Development Corporation (TNRIDC) and funded through the State Highways Department, is expected to give a thrust to industrial activity in the Oragadam-Sriperumbudur cluster. It will also provide additional connectivity between Grand Southern Trunk Road (GST Road i.e. National Highway 45) and Grand Western Trunk Road (National Highway 4).

Companies based in Oragadam and neighboring areas include Apollo Tyres, Allison Transmission, Asian Paints Limited, Bosch India, Daimler India Commercial vehicles, Delphi-TVS Diesel Systems Limited, India Yamaha Motor, Mindarika Private Limited (Indo Japanese Joint Venture Company), Nokia Siemens Networks, Nissan, Nokia SEZ, Renault Nissan Automotive India, Royal Enfield and Sandhar Technologies Ltd.

== Educational institutions in and around Oragadam ==
- Xavier Institute of Management and Entrepreneurship, Chennai
- Agathiya Matriculation Higher Secondary School, Walajabad up to 12th Std.
- Little Flower Higher Secondary School, Theraesapuram
- Monford CBSE School up to 5th Std., Theraesapuram
- Apollo Priyadarashanam Polytechnic College
- Sri Krishna Engineering College, Panapakkam
- Dhaanish Ahamed College of Engineering, Vanchuvanchery
- Raasi College of Engineering, Vanchuvanchery
- P. S. Temple Green Vidhyashram (CBSE) at the ArunExcello's TempleGreen project, Mathur Post, Oragadam.
- Thriveni Academy (CBSE) at the Evita Constructions Pvt. Ltd., Hiranandani Park, Thriveni Nagar (Vadakku Pattu)
- Thirumagal Polytechnic College, Vanchuvanchery, Padappai

== Hospitals and healthcare facilities in and around Oragadam ==
- Parvathy Ortho Hospital, Jamunampattu Village
- Hiranandani Parks Hospital, Triveni Nagar
- Sayee Hospitals, Padappai
- Hoscons Medical Centre & Hospitals, Oragadam
- RMD Multispeciality Hospital, Amarambedu, Sriperumbudur, Behind SIPCOT, Irungatukotai
- Factor Healthcare, Nemili Road, Sriperumbudur
- Dr. Sivakumar Emergency Care Centre, Oragadam
