= BharatBenz =

Brand of Daimler India Commercial Vehicles

Bharat Benz
- Type: Brand
- Industry: Automotive
- Founded: 17 February 2011; 15 years ago
- Headquarters: Chennai, India
- Key people: Sathyakam Arya (MD & CEO)
- Products: Trucks; Buses
- Services: Financial services
- Revenue: ▲₹10,665 crore (US$1.1 billion) (2023)
- Net income: ▲₹305 crore (US$32 million) (2023)
- Owner: Daimler Truck
- Number of employees: 4,000 +
- Parent: Daimler India Commercial Vehicles
- Website: www.bharatbenz.com

BharatBenz is a brand of Daimler India Commercial Vehicles (DICV), itself a wholly-owned subsidiary of the German manufacturer Daimler Truck AG. The brand is known for its trucks and buses. The headquarters of Bharat Benz is at Oragadam, Chennai, India.

The "Bharat" part is symbolic for India.

== History ==
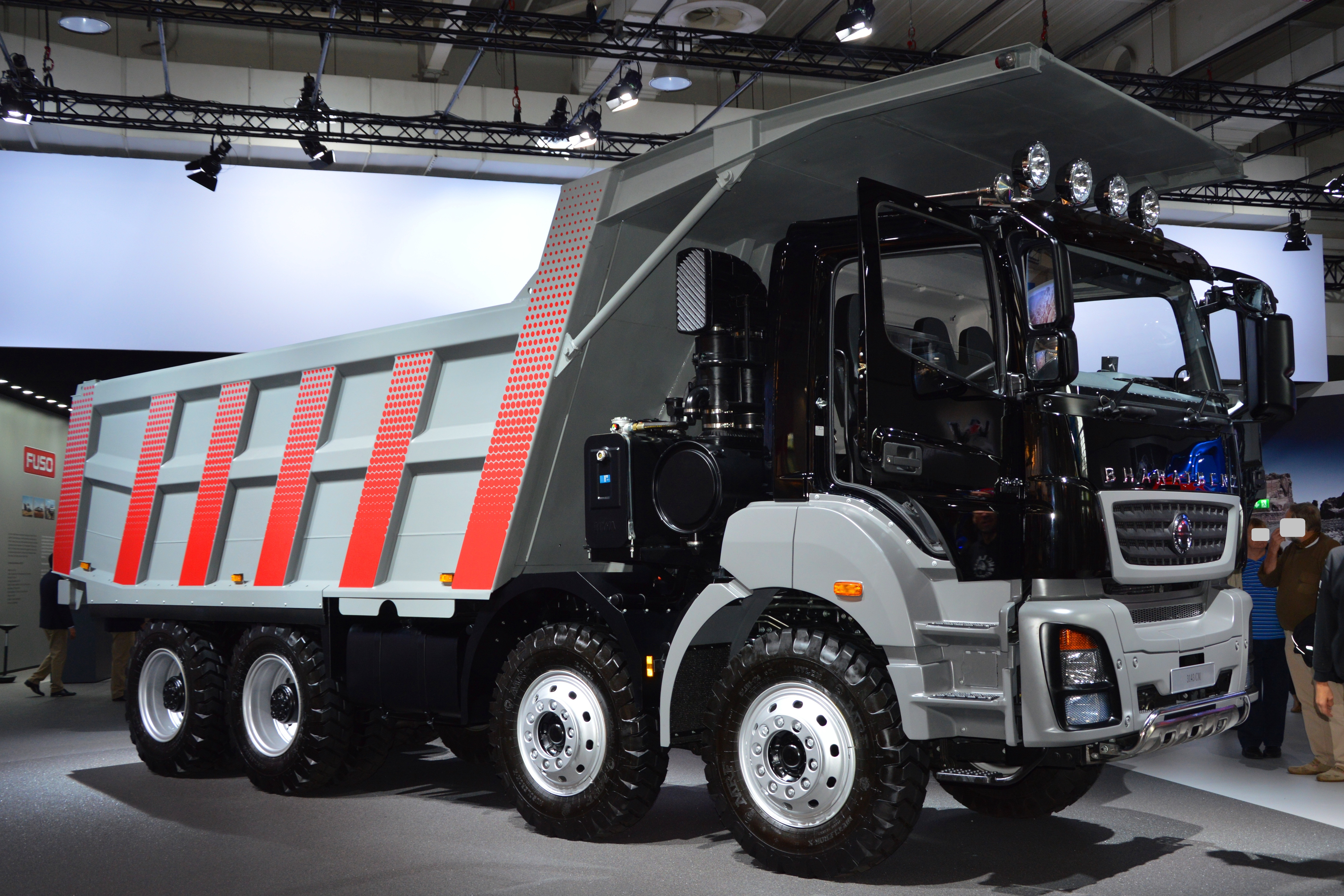
Bharat Benz Tipper Truck Lorry at exhibition IAA 2014 in Hanover, Germany

- In 2008, Daimler AG planned to enter the Indian market in a joint venture with Hero MotoCorp to build medium and heavy commercial vehicles. A joint venture named Daimler Hero Commercial Vehicles (DHCV) was formed under a Memorandum of Understanding (MOU) in July 2008 with 60% holding of Daimler AG and 40% holding of Hero Group.
- Daimler AG and Hero Group announced they dissolved the Daimler Hero Commercial Vehicles Ltd. joint venture on 15 April 2009 because of an economic downturn in India. Hero Group decided to focus on core operation and return the 40% stake in DHCV joint venture to Daimler AG. With 100% stake, Daimler AG renamed DHCV as Daimler India Commercial Vehicles (DICV).
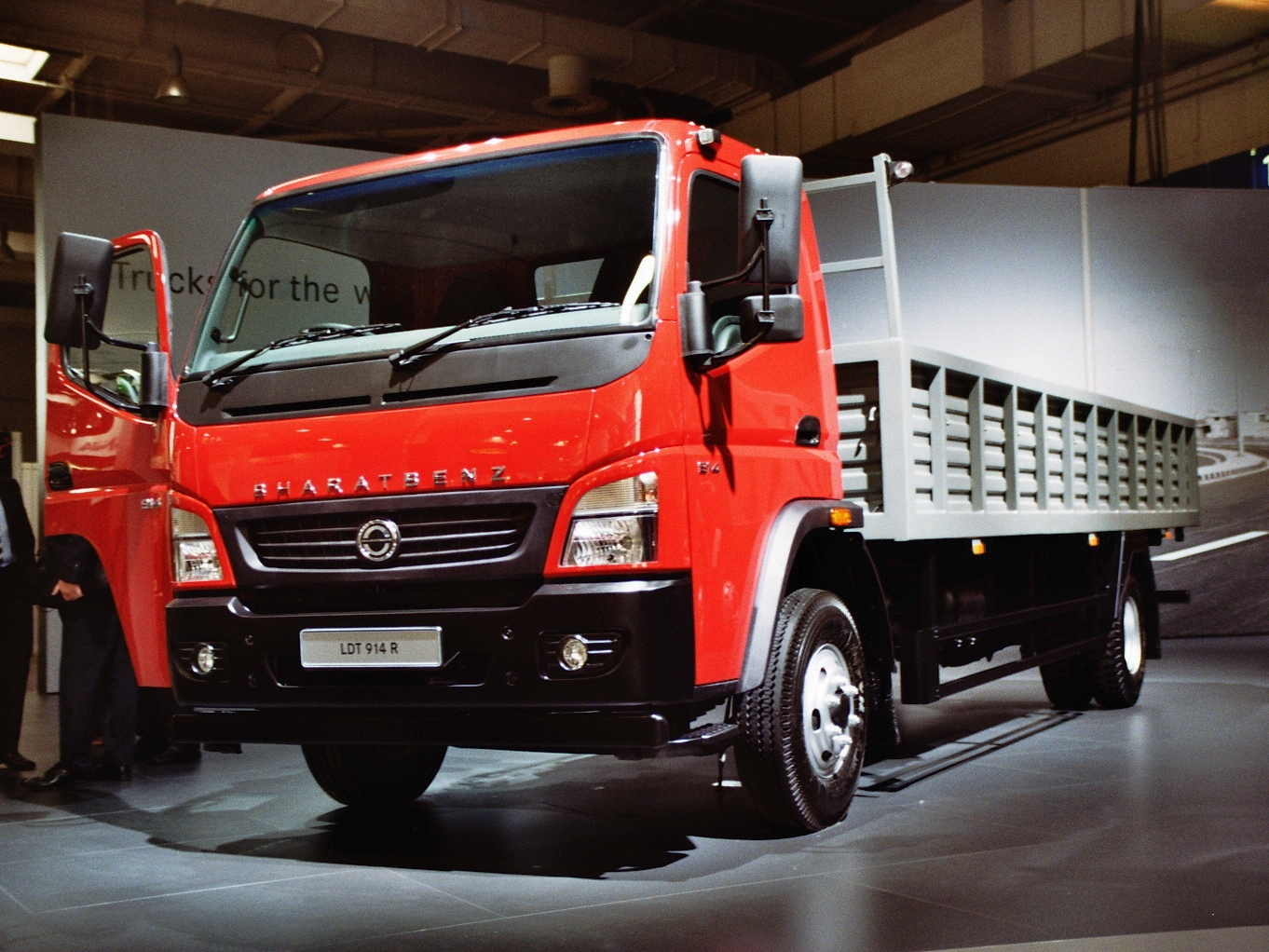
  Bharat Benz MDT (Medium- Duty Maxi Tempo Truck) 914
- The launch of the Bharat Benz brand was announced on 17 February 2011 in Chennai by Daimler AG Chairman Dieter Zetsche and the first Bharat Benz truck was unveiled on 4 January 2012 at the Delhi Auto Expo. The decision to launch the brand was prompted by Daimler's determination to compete in the fast-growing Indian truck market against existing Indian brands such as Ashok Leyland, Tata Motors and Indian ventures of other leading global truck manufacturers like VE Commercial Vehicles (Volvo-Eicher Motors Joint Venture). The entire proposed truck line-up in the 9 to 49-tonne range was unveiled on 2 March 2012.
- In early 2014 Bharat Benz launched the tractor trailer models and a construction model making itself a full range player in the segment above 9T category spanning across medium and heavy-duty truck segments.
- In May 2015, Bharat Benz inaugurated its new bus manufacturing facility in Oragadam, Chennai and unveiled its second wave of products – BharatBenz and Mercedes-Benz buses as well as a new range of Bharat Benz trucks and Bharat Benz heavy-duty tractors.

== Bus ==
The following are the buses offered by BharatBenz:

=== Buses ===
- 917 (Bus chassis with 125kW 4D34i engine)
- 1017 (Bus chassis with 125kW 4D34i engine)
- 1624 (Bus chassis with 180kW OM926 engine)
- 1924 (Bus chassis with 180kW OM926 engine)
- 1017 School Bus (Wrightbus bodywork, 125kW 4D34i engine)
- 1017 Staff Bus (Wrightbus bodywork, 125kW 4D34i engine)

== Trucks ==
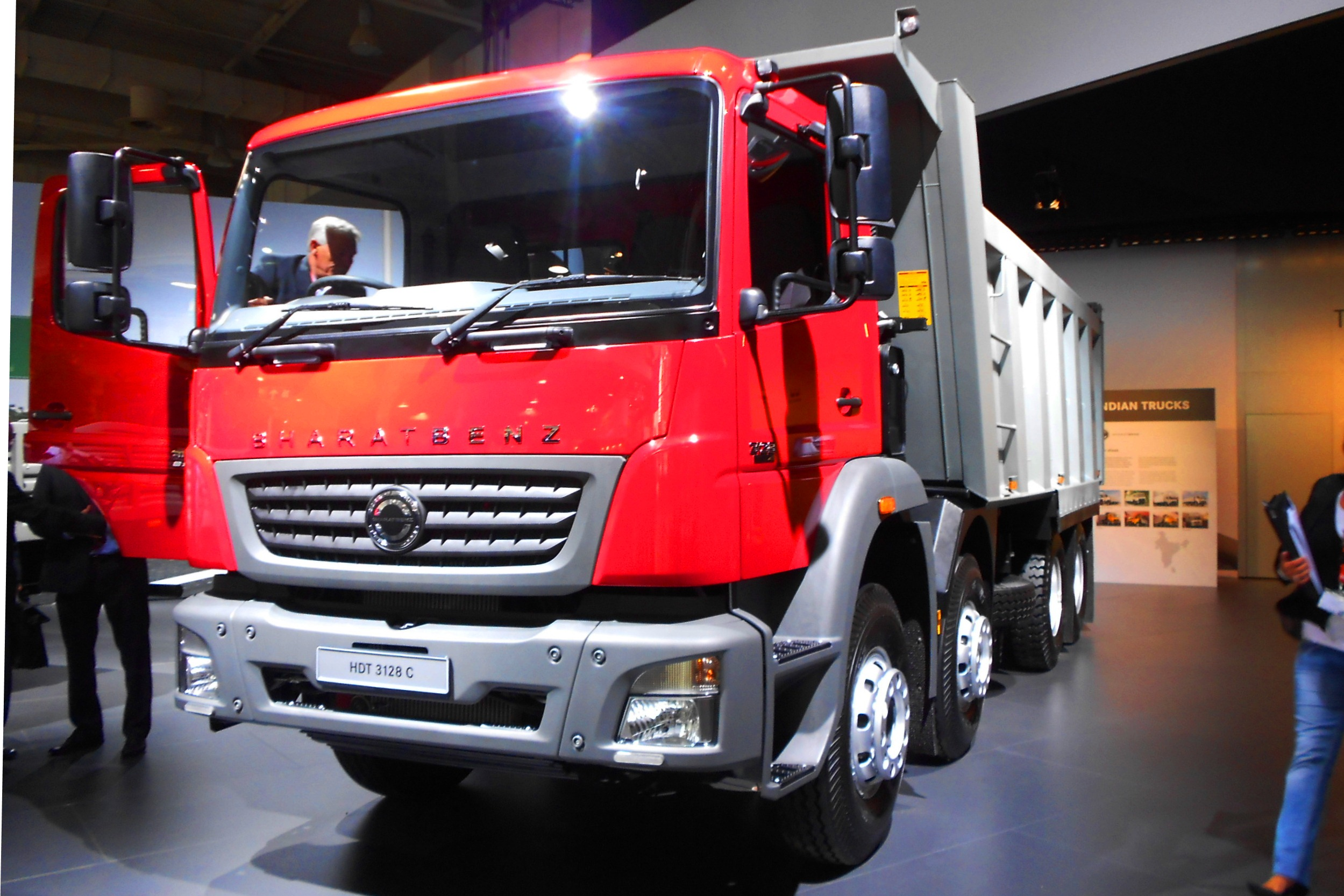
BharatBenz HDT 3128 C (heavy-duty truck)

The BharatBenz heavy-duty trucks are built on the Mercedes-Benz Axor platform, and the medium-duty trucks on the Fuso Canter and Fuso Fighter series. The entire product line meets BSIII standards (comparable to Euro III). All BharatBenz (17 models) trucks are slated to be up to 9% more expensive but 10% more fuel efficient than the competition. The Fuso medium and heavy-duty trucks produced in Chennai are also being exported to markets of Africa and Asia, under Daimler's Asia Business Model. BharatBenz crossed 30,000 units sale mark in January 2016.

From November 2015, Daimler India Commercial Vehicles started delivery of its first set of made-in-India buses. The front engine buses are branded as BharatBenz and are based on the Mitsubishi Fuso Canter platform. These are available in school, staff and tourist variants. The rear engine buses are branded as Mercedes-Benz and are based on the Mercedes-Benz O-500 series. Daimler India Commercial Vehicles have tied-up with Ireland-based organisation WrightBus for bus body building. WrightBus is known for their unique patented aluminique alloy structure, which is lighter and stronger than conventional steel, increasing fuel efficiency and making the buses safer.

On 22 August 2024, DICV launched its a new range of BharatBenz heavy-duty rigid trucks powered by the all-new BharatBenz BSVI-Stage2 6.7-litre diesel engine. Models in the all-new BharatBenz heavy-duty rigid range will be available to customers needing 2826R (6x2), 3526R (8x2), 3832R (8x2), 4232R (10x2) and 4832R (10x2) configurations.

Daimler is also exporting these buses under the brand of Mercedes-Benz to African and South-Asian markets.

=== Trucks ===
==== MDT ====
- 1117R (11T GVW Truck, 125 kW)
- 1217C (13T GVW Truck, 125 kW)
- 1217R (12T GVW Truck, 125 kW)
- 1217RE (13T GVW Truck, 125 kW)
- 1417R (14.5T GVW Truck, 125 kW)
- 1417RE (14.5T GVW Truck, 125 kW)
- 1617R (16T GVW Truck, 125kW)
- 1617RD (16T GVW Truck, 125kW)
- 1917R (18.5T GVW Truck, 125kW)

==== HDT C ====
- 1926C (18.5T GVW Tipper, 191kW)
- 2826C (28T GVW Tipper, 191kW)
- 2828C HX (28T GVW Tipper, 210kW)
- 2828CH (27.6T GVW Tipper, 210kW)
- 2832CM TORQSHIFT (28T GVW Tipper, 236kW)
- 3532C HX (35T GVW Tipper, 236kW)
- 3232CM TORQSHIFT (35T GVW Tipper, 236kW)
- 2828C RMC (28T GVW Truck, 210kW)

==== HDT R ====
- 2826R (28T GVW Truck, 186kW)
- 3526R (35T GVW Truck, 186kW)
- 3832R (38T GVW Truck, 228kW)
- 4232R (42T GVW Truck, 228kW)
- 4832R (47.5T GVW Truck, 228kW)

==== HDT RT ====
- 2823RT (28T GVW Truck,180kW)
- 3523RT (35T GVW Truck,180kW)
- 4228RT (42T GVW Truck, 210kW)
- 4828RT (47.5T GVW Truck, 210kW)

HDT T

- 4023T (39.5T GVW Tractor Trailer, 180kW)
- 4028T (39.5T GVW Tractor Trailer, 210kW)
- 4628T 4x2 (45.5T GVW Tractor Trailer, 210kW)
- 5528T 4x2 (55T GVW Tractor Trailer, 210kW)
- 4032T TORQSHIFT (41.5T GVW Tractor Trailer, 236kW)
- 5032T (50T GVW Tractor Trailer, 236kW)
- 5432T (54T GVW Tractor Trailer, 236kW)
- 5532T 4x2 (55T GVW Tractor Trailer, 236kW)
- 5532T 6x4 (55T GVW Tractor Trailer, 236kW)
- 5532T HR (55T GVW Tractor Trailer, 235kW)

== Production facility ==
DICV set up a manufacturing plant for the BharatBenz trucks in Oragadam, near Chennai in Tamil Nadu at an investment of over €700 million (₹44 billion). This is its biggest investment outside Europe. Construction area for plant is 400 acres, out of which 47 acres are dedicated to 3-lane 1.55 kilometer test track. Test track include a bump track, pothole testing and articulation sections, a water trough, an inspection ramp and a control tower. Initial production capacity at the plant was 36000 units per year for 2012 and was to be expanded to 70,000 units per year by the start of 2013 with an additional investment of ₹3.5 billion. Series production started in June 2012 with the 2523R truck; sales began in September 2012.

Currently, BharatBenz has over, 3500 employees including both Indian and German staff. Localization rate for BharatBenz truck is 85% with more than 450 local suppliers out of which 41 percent are based in Tamil Nadu and 44 percent are in rest of the country, with an aim to exceed 90%.

Daimler has test driven its trucks a distance of 4.5 million km in various conditions at its test track in Oragadam.

=== Research and development facility ===
DICV set up a research and development facility at Oragadam manufacturing plant with an initial investment of ₹12 billion.

=== Bus manufacturing plant ===
On 27 May 2015, DICV inaugurated its new bus manufacturing facility in Oragadam, Chennai. The state-of-the-art bus manufacturing plant, constructed within the premises of DICV and spread across an area of 27.91 acres, manufactures and assemble buses under two brands: Mercedes-Benz and BharatBenz. With an investment of Rs 425 crore, the bus plant is set up for an initial capacity of 1,500 units which can be further expanded to 4,000 units subsequently.

=== Partnerships ===
On 30 July 2024, Daimler India Commercial Vehicles (DICV), announced its strategic partnership with Bajaj Finance to provide customized financing solutions for its commercial vehicle customers and dealerships. This collaboration aims to enhance the accessibility and convenience of financing options for DICV's entire range of Bharat Benz commercial vehicles.

== Milestones ==
- On 11 August 2016, the 50,000th truck rolled off the line at DICV. DICV reached this milestone just four years after the first vehicle left the line and one year after the 30,000th vehicle was produced.
- In January 2017, the 5000th bus chassis was rolled out of the Daimler Buses India plant. Currently, available bus models from this facility are Mercedes-Benz SHD 2436 (multi axle) – BSIV version, Bharat Benz & Mercedes-Benz 9Ton. In April 2017, a new model of front engine 16ton 230 hp (1623) buses was launched in the Indian market (seater and sleeper versions).
- On 12 April 2021 Bharat Benz Heavy duty truck HDT 5228T/5428T was awarded HCV Tractor-head Of The Year by Apollo CV awards.
- In November 2024 Bharat Benz launched their first automatic transmission truck, the 3532CM this mining truck was equipped with Torqshift technology used globally in Mercedes Trucks. Bharat Benz would also launch tractors with automatic transmission to improve the driving conditions and experience in India.
