= Thriveni Academy =

Indian school

Thriveni Academy is a C.B.S.E. day school catering to educating rural children of Vadakupattu village and surrounding villages in Oragadam in Kancheepuram district. More than 1200 children are enrolled in this school today, under the management of Hiranandani group.

== History ==
The school was started in 1987 by Mr. P. V. Sivan Nair, as a fully residential school on more than 1000 acres of land and sprawling infrastructure capable of housing more than 10,000 students.

The school was run by MMFG (Madras Motor Finance & Guarantee) Company headquartered in Mylapore, Chennai. From 1987 to 1997, the school saw steady growth of students coming from different parts of India, especially the North Eastern States of Assam, West Bengal, Nagaland, Manipur, Sikkim, etc. With extensive roadshows throughout India, and provision of many extra curricular activities, a variety of sports and good food, the school became a popular educational destination for all round development of children. Aditya Chaudhary a student of class X in 2002 was the last known suicidal death in the hostel room. Following which the school was closed in 2004. Lateron the school was reopened for local people. The school has 3 building named as Ganga, yamuna and swarsaswati. Ankush De a student from north east was the last known student in the era of 2002. In 2002 the school was managed by Partha kunda Roy a retired wing commander. The principal was Jaipal.

== Sports and Cultural Facilities ==
Thriveni Academy is part of Hiranandani Parks, Oragadam township. The school, after a brief history of legal battle, is fully functioning with sporting facilities such as a cricket ground, soccer field, tennis courts, basketball court, squash courts, volleyball/throwball courts and track and field grounds. The School hosted a squash tournament in 2018.

Yoga and karate classes are offered to all children. The School now offers NCC training and has its own girls and boys scouts. The School has created its own marching band where students are taught to drum and march. The Green Corps develops gardening skills.

The School houses a 1000 capacity auditorium and convention center with an attached dining hall. Cultural shows and events are conducted that motivate students to learn and perform. Recently, the School participated in Salangai puja for Bharatnatyam dancers.

Many educational events such as quiz competitions, debates, competitions are held in the auditorium for various age groups.

The School has learning laboratories such as the English Lab, Math Lab, and Social Sciences Lab. The Science department has its own Biology, Chemistry, Physics labs where experiments are conducted.
