= Yokohama Off-Highway Tires =

Indian tire manufacturer

- Type: Private company
- Industry: Manufacturing company
- Founded: 1950; 76 years ago
- Headquarters: Mumbai, India
- Area served: Europe, USA, Japan, and Latin America
- Parent: Yokohama Rubber Company
- Website: yokohama-oht.com/usa/

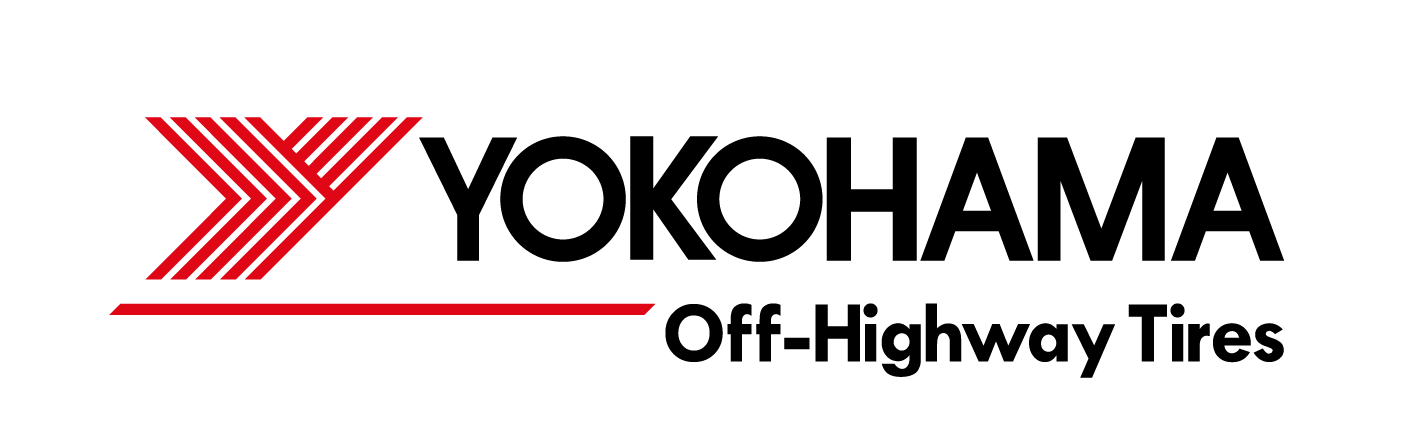
Yokohama Off-Highway Tires

Yokohama Off-Highway Tires (formerly Alliance Tire Company (Pvt.) Ltd.) is a tire manufacturing company based in Mumbai, India producing and marketing tires for agricultural, multi-purpose and industrial clients in Europe, the USA, Japan, and Latin America. It has three manufacturing plants in Hadera (Israel); Tirunelvelli and Dahej (India) and it is owned by Yokohama Rubber Company since 2016.

== History ==
Only two years after the creation of the State of Israel in 1948 wave of aliyah immigration drove the government to encourage new industries. In 1950, a tire manufacturer plant named Samson was founded in Petah Tikva by General Tire and Rubber Company. A few executives from the Solel Boneh company decided to open a competing company and later that year, with know-how from the "Dayton Tire and Rubber Company" (since bought by Bridgestone), Alliance was founded. Dayton was owned by A. L. Friedlander, for which the street the company is located on has been named. Friedlander, a Jewish zionist, was excited about the venture and managed to raise funds from fifteen other enthusiastic American Jews who would share a 49% stake. In 1971, Alliance acquired Samson.

Alliance originally produced pneumatic tires for cars but in the 1960s, it started offering tractor tires, an area that would become its expertise. During the Cold War, the company exported to the Eastern Bloc indirectly through Cuba. In 1983, Koor became the major shareholder of Alliance. From 1988 to 1992, the company operated under the Official Receiver of the State of Israel, under a program similar to Chapter 11 in the United States. The recovery plan succeeded and the company returned to profitability in 1990. In 1992, Alliance's assets and operations were sold to new owners, "Fishman Holding" of Israel, and U. Zucker and Bear Stearns of the U.S. and in 1993, Alliance went public on the Tel Aviv Stock Exchange floating 10%.

In July 2007, Alliance was fully acquired by Warburg Pincus, a global private equity firm and the Mahansaria family for about $48 million plus Alliance's debt of $100 million.

At its peak, Alliance employed about 1500 people. Notwithstanding the success and growth, technological advancements allowed the company to become more efficient. As of 2006, Alliance employs over 950 people and has revenue of over US$163 Million (78.5% export and 21.5% local.

In 2007, the Mahansaria family with the support of Warburg Pincus acquired Alliance Tires Company of Israel which owned the brand 'Alliance' to form Alliance Tire Group.

In 2009, the Mahansaria family acquired GPX which is an American company and owns the brand Galaxy for $54 million. Alliance Tire Group has three brands - Alliance, Galaxy and Primex.

In April 2013, KKR bought out stake held by Warburg Pincus.

ATG was acquired by the Japanese Yokohama Rubber Company in July 2016. The current Chairman of the company is Atao Kishi and the CEO is Nitin Mantri.

Locations:

- Israel
- China
- Europe
- India
- South Africa
- United States
- Latin America
- South America
- Mexico

== Bibliography ==
- Yogesh Mahansaria's Second Coming With Alliance Tires | Forbes India
- The Wheel Of Fortune: Yogesh Mahansaria's Nurturing Has Taken Alliance Tire Places | Forbes India
