= Madras Export Processing Zone =

Special economic zone in Chennai, India

Coordinates: 12°56′37″N 80°07′16″E

- Type: Special Economic Zone
- Founded: 1984
- Headquarters: Chennai, India
- Products: Multi-product (Garments, software, engineering)
- Owner: Government of India
- Website: www.mepz.gov.in

Madras Export Processing Zone (MEPZ) is a special economic zone in Chennai, India. It is one of the seven export processing zones in the country set up by the central government. It was established in 1984 to promote foreign direct investment, enhance foreign exchange earnings, and create greater employment opportunities in the region.

== Location ==
The MEPZ is located on GST Road in Tambaram, Chennai. It is located 6 km south of Chennai International Airport.

== History ==
The MEPZ was started in 1984 as an initiative of the Ministry of Commerce and Industry with an investment of ₹ 6716.7 million. On 1 January 2003, the zone was converted into a special economic zone (SEZ) with an added objective of facilitating exports through reduction of transaction costs. To facilitate this, the Ministry of Commerce and Industries introduced special features such as offshore banking units and container freight stations to be set up within the zone, in addition to liberalised customs procedures.

In March 2013, an additional exit and entry point for heavy vehicles arriving at and leaving the MEPZ–SEZ was opened.

== Administration ==
The zone is under the administrative control of the Ministry of Commerce and Industries and caters to the needs of units within the SEZ, in addition to monitoring the functions of 100-percent export-oriented units (EOUs) located in Tamil Nadu, Pondicherry, and Andaman & Nicobar Islands. The zone is headed by a development commissioner.

== Special economic zone ==
Spread over an area of 265 acres (109 hectares), MEPZ SEZ is a multi-product zone housing 117 functional units. In addition, another 27 units are under various stages of implementation. The zone employs over 26,000 people. In the manufacturing front, there are 110 SME units in the zone. MEPZ's manufacturing sector employs nearly 20,000 people. IT companies housed in the zone include Cognizant Technology Solutions, Computer Sciences Corporation, CSS and HTC Global Services among others. About 50 container trucks arrive at and leave the zone every day.

=== Infrastructure ===
The zone has an exclusive 230 KV sub-station, capable of supplying 30 MW. It also has an exclusive telephone exchange with fibre optic connectivity, a post office, video conferencing facility in the administrative building, and a telecommunication tower. The foreign exchange transactions of the zone are facilitated by a branch of Indian Bank located within the SEZ.

== Revenue ==
The export turnover for the year 2006-2007 was ₹ 24,620 million, of which manufacturing sector accounted for 70 percent. Garments, software, and engineering products contributed more than 50 percent of the export value. In recent years, engineering sector has been promoted with special reference to automobile ancillaries.

As of 2008, software exports from the zone averaged ₹ 300 to 350 million per month.

== See also ==
- Economy of Chennai
