= Padappai =

- town
- Location in CMA, India Padappai (Tamil Nadu) Padappai (India)
- Coordinates: 12.8870°N 80.0213°E
- Country: India
- State: Tamil Nadu
- District: Kanchipuram
- Metro: Chennai City

Population
  - Total: 8,285

Languages
  - Official: Tamil
- Time zone: UTC+5:30 (IST)
- PIN: 601301
- Vehicle registration: TN-11

Padappai is a town near Chennai, India. It is a small town developing fast in Chennai suburbs about 12 km from Tambaram connected to Bangalore highway and near Oragadam SIPCOT & many big companies like Nissan, Appolo tyres, Alstom T&D, Tii Techno Testing Services PVT LTD, Infac India are few companies near this small town.

The road from Vandalur to Walajabad via Oragadam is known as Padappai road that connects Chennai and Kanchipuram, an alternate road for Chennai Bangalore highway NH 4. Padappai road and Sriperumpudur (NH4) to Singaperumalkoil (NH45) road meets at Oragadam, known as "Oragadam kootu road".

The nearby villages in Padappai road (Vandaloor to Walajabad) are Athanancherry, Panapakkam, Vanchuvancherry, Umaianparangcherry, Cherrappanancherry, Kuzhangalacherri, Nariyampakkam, KaaranaiThangal, Karasangal, Oragadam, Ezhichur, Pandruti, Varanavasi, Mettupalayam, Aarambakkam, Uthukkadu, Vembakkam, Devariyampakkam, Kunnavakkam, Thalampattu, Aloor, Eraiyamangalam, Vattambakkam, Eraiyur, Ammanambakkam Vaipur (Vaipoor), Salamangalam, Sirumathur, Samadhuvapuram, and Mannivakkam.

Padappai is the name from ancient Tamil which means "Beautiful Flower Garden", Bunch of edibles.
