= Sembium-Ayanavaram municipality =

Sembium
- Former panchayat (town)
- Location within Tamil Nadu
- Coordinates: 13.11738°N 80.22693°E
- Country: India
- State: Tamil Nadu
- District: Chingleput District (Madras Presidency)
- Panchayat (not exists): Sembium

Area
  - Total: 37.73 km^{2} (14.57 sq mi)
- Elevation: 35 m (115 ft)

Population (1941)
  - Total: 25,912
  - Density: 686.8/km^{2} (1,779/sq mi)

Sembium is a former panchayat which was annexed to Chennai in 1946. It was a sub-taluk of Saidapettai taluk of Old Chinglepet District.

== History ==
Sembium was an old panchayat comprising villages of Sembium, Ayanavaram, Siruvallur, and Peravallur. Ayanavaram, the major business hub of the North Chennai, was once the part of Sembium Panchayat.

The Sembium - Ayanavaram Municipal council was annexed to the town of St. George in 1946. After the annexure of Sembium - Ayanavaram, Madras municipality became a city.

== Demographics ==
Historical population
Year	Pop.	±%
1871	5,345	—
1881	7,782	+45.6%
1891	9,013	+15.8%
1901	13,562	+50.5%
1911	16,924	+24.8%
1921	18,527	+9.5%
1931	22,719	+22.6%
1941	25,912	+14.1%
