= SIPCOT IT Park =

IT park in Chennai, India; largest in Asia

Coordinates: 12.82590°N 80.21607°E

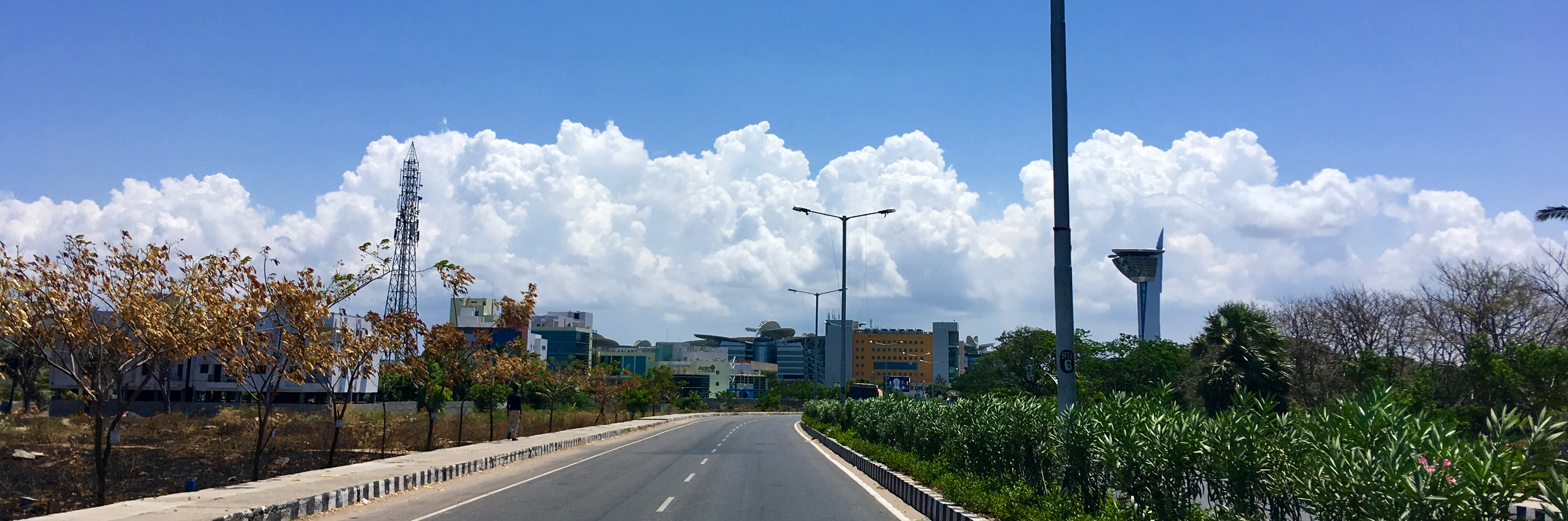
SIPCOT IT Park with the TCS Signature Tower visible in the background

SIPCOT IT Park is an IT park located in Siruseri in the city of Chennai, along the IT Corridor, Chengalpattu District, India.

It was developed on 782.51 acres (4 km^{2}) of land by SIPCOT, the State Industries Promotion Corporation of Tamil Nadu, a fully government-owned institution. Founded in June 1971, it is the second-largest IT park in Asia.

In 2016, security arrangements in the 1000-acre park were tightened. In 2019, SIPCOT also rejuvenated the lake inside the park. In April 2025, an AI ready data centre was inaugurated.
