= Siruseri =

Siruseri, Chennai
- suburb of Chennai
- Location in Tamil Nadu, India
- Coordinates: 12.835°N 80.20°E
- Country: India
- State: Tamil Nadu
- District: Chengalpattu district
- Taluk: Thiruporur
- Metro: Chennai

Languages
  - Official: Tamil
- Time zone: UTC+5:30 (IST)

Siruseri is a southern suburb of Chennai, India. It is a village under Thiruporur panchayat union in Chengalpattu district, Tamil Nadu, and is 35 km from Chennai, along the Old Mahabalipuram Road. It is located between Navalur and Kelambakkam.

== Siruseri IT park ==
Siruseri is home to the SIPCOT IT Park, a technology park. State Industries Promotion Corporation of Tamil Nadu Ltd., SIPCOT, has developed an Information Technology Park in 1,000 acres (4 km^{2}) of land at Siruseri Village. The IT park is the largest IT park in South India about 35 km on OMR from Chennai City, in the Cyber Corridor for allotment of land to IT Companies, who wish to build their own campuses. This park proposes to have all basic infrastructure facilities like separate Sub-Station for power supply, separate telephone exchange and High Speed Data Connectivity. Several IT companies have booked land in this facility and some companies have already started their operations from here.

== Academic institutions ==
- Chennai Mathematical Institute
- PSBB School, L&T Eden Park Township, Siruseri
- ITM, Management College, Siruseri
- Mohamed Sathak A J College of Engineering

== Transportation ==
Siruseri's main bus stop is on Old Mahabalipuram Road, outside the SIPCOT IT Park, between Padur and Egattur areas. Buses that stop here are:

- 19B,519ext, M51D: Saidapet to Kelambakkam
- M5,519: Adyar to Kelambakkam
- M19A: Thiruvanmiyur to Kelambakkam
- 523,523A : Thiruvanmiyur to Thiruporur
- 570,119,568C : CMBT to Kelambakkam
- T151, M151 : Tambaram to Kovalam
- 102 : Broadway to Kelambakkam
- 219A : AC Bus Ambattur I.E to Kelambakkam
- 221H : Central to Kelambakkam
- B19 : Solinganullur to Kelambakkam
- 570S: CMBT to Siruseri
- 105: Tambaram to Siruseri
