= YAPP Automotive Systems =

YAPP Automotive Systems Co., Ltd. (亚普汽车部件股份有限公司) is a supplier to the automotive industry, specialized in fuel systems, in particular plastic fuel tanks. Founded in 1988 and headquartered in Yangzhou, China, the company has 13 plants and 5 plants overseas. Important customers include Volkswagen, GM, Ford, PSA Peugeot Citroen, Mercedes-Benz, BMW, Suzuki, Nissan, SAIC Motor, and FAW Group.

Yapp, Plastic Omnium, Kautex, TI Automotive, and Yachiyo occupy roughly 70% share of the global automotive plastic fuel tank market together. On the Chinese market, Yapp takes the lead with 30% market share.

== See also ==
- Automotive industry in China
