= Sandhar Technologies =

Indian listed automotive component manufacturer

Sandhar Technologies Limited
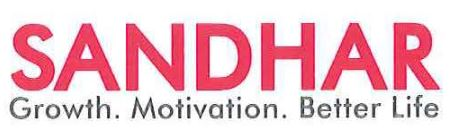
- Company type: Public
- Traded as: BSE: 541163; NSE: SANDHAR
- Industry: Manufacturing
- Founded: 1987
- Founder: Jayant Davar
- Headquarters: Delhi, India
- Number of locations: India, Spain, Mexico, Poland
- Area served: Worldwide
- Key people: Arvind Joshi (whole-time director, CFO, CS)
- Products: Automobile equipment
- Services: Engineering
- Revenue: ▲US$430.6 million(FY 2025)
- Total assets: ▲US$307.4 million(FY 2025)
- Total equity: ▲US$150 million(FY 2025)
- Number of employees: 11,000+
- Subsidiaries: Sandhar Technologies Barcelona, Sandhar Tooling, Sandhar Strategic Systems Private Limited
- Website: sandhargroup.com
- Footnotes / references Annual Report 2025

Sandhar Technologies Limited or Sandhar Group or Sandhar (/səndhɑːr/), is an Indian multinational and a global manufacturer of automotive components. The company was founded in 1987 by Jayant Davar, currently has 3 subsidiaries and 10 joint venture with 47 factories all over the world.

== History ==
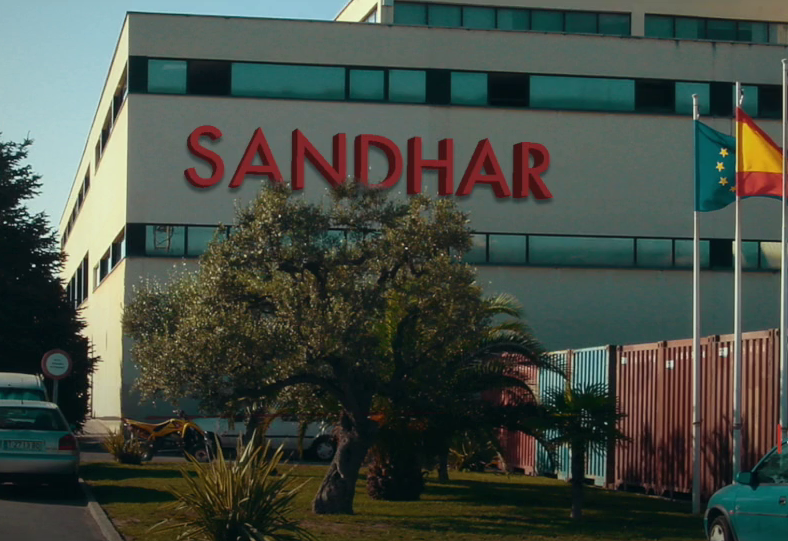
Sandhar Technologies Barcelona, S. L.

- 1987-90: The company was founded in 1987 by Jayant Davar and started supplying sheet metals for Hero Honda motorcycles and received technical assistance from Honda Lock to manufacture lock systems for the motorbikes.
- 1990-95: It started producing mirrors and door handles for Honda cars thanks to technical assistance received from Honda Lock and even up to the date it is the only supplier for Honda cars.
- 2000-05: The company starts investing in Zn, Al die casting and tools and dies.
- 2006-10: Enters in the field of wheel assembly production such as handle bar, spools for seatbelt retractors and PDC products.
- 2011-16: The business expanded to manufacture plastic injection moulding seatbelts then eventually set up a research unit Gurugram.
- 2016-18: Thanks to joint venture with Whetron and Jinyoung, the company has started to manufacture automotive electronic products. In December 2017 the company entered into joint venture with Daeshin Machinery Ind. Co. Ltd. By the end of 2018, the company announced a joint venture with Kwangsung Corporation Ltd., Rep Korea to manufacture sunvisor, cargo screen, black-Out tape, glove box & several other blow-moulded products.
- 2019: The company has entered into Joint Venture with Winnercom Co. Ltd., and Hanshin Corporation of Rep Korea,
