= Gangaikondan =

- Town
- Location in Tamil Nadu, India
- Coordinates: 8.85°N 77.78°E
- Country: India
- State: Tamil Nadu
- District: Tirunelveli
- Elevation: 47 m (154 ft)

Population (2011)
  - Total: 9,999

Languages
  - Official: Tamil
- Time zone: UTC+5:30 (IST)
- PIN: 627352
- Vehicle registration: TN-72

Gangaikondan is a panchayat town in Tirunelveli district and a suburb of Tirunelveli city in the state of Tamil Nadu, India. It is located about 20 km north of Tirunelveli on the way to Madurai on NH 44. It is one of the industrial hubs of Tirunelveli. Gangaikondan is well known for its Arulmigu Anandavalli Udan Kailasnathar Kovil.

== Geography ==
Gangaikondan is located at 8.85°N 77.78°E. It has an average elevation of 47 metres (154 feet).

== Demographics ==
As of 2001 India census, Gangaikondan had a population of 10,254. Males constitute 52% of the population and females 48%. Gangaikondan has an average literacy rate of 73%, higher than the national average of 59.5%: male literacy is 81%, and female literacy is 65%. In Gangaikondan, 13% of the population is under 6 years of age.

== Industrial development ==
The ELCOT IT Park located there houses one of the global development centers (GDCs) of major IT outsourcing, IT consulting and BPO firm Syntel.

A 400-million-rupee (95 million US dollar) tyre manufacturing facility is run by Yokohama Rubber Company owned Alliance Tire Company Tires Private Limited at the State Industries Promotion Corporation of Tamil Nadu (SIPCOT) industrial park having a capacity to make 54,000 tonnes a year with a direct and indirect workforce of around 1800.

Bosch India Limited operates a 5800 m^{2} plant for manufacturing gasoline systems division products by which Bosch is working to reducing its imports significantly. An Indane LPG bottling plant, which is the largest in the state, is being constructed there and is expected to have a capacity to fill 36,000 cylinders every day.

The town is home to one of Kovilpatti Lakshmi Roller Flour Mills' flour and textile divisions, and is where the company was established in 1964, with a 46,800 MT flour mill. It also provides employment specifically for the region.
