= Thervoy Kandigai =

Village in Tamil Nadu, India

Thervaay Kandigai is a village in Tiruvallur District in Tamil Nadu state of India. It has about 5000 inhabitants. It is considered as the second largest village in Thiruvallur district and it is also considered that the village has more graduates than any other villages in Thiruvallur district. The village is about 50 km North of Chennai. Michelin has built a tyre factory in Thervaay Kandigai.

Many of the inhabitants of this village work in Michelin and in other companies which is built in Thervaay Kandigai Industrial park. The first building has been opened officially in May 2011.

A Thervaay Kandigai Industrial Park exists.

Michelin has invested 40 billions there.

The factory endangers the rainforests being the livelihood of the population.
