= Rajiv Gandhi Salai =

State highway in Tamil Nadu

Coordinates: 12.975897°N 80.251018°E

Rajiv Gandhi Salai

- Rajiv Gandhi Salai (SH 49A) highlighted in red

Route information
- Maintained by Tamil Nadu Road Development Corporation
- Length: 43.7 km (27.2 mi)
- Existed: 29 October 2008–present
- Component highways: TN-SH

Major junctions
- North end: Madhya Kailash Junction, Chennai
- TIDEL Park Jn; Thoraipakkam; Sholinganallur; Kelambakkam-Vandalur Road Jn; Thiruporur
- South end: Mahabalipuram

Location
- Country: India
- State: Tamil Nadu

Highway system
- Roads in India; Expressways; National; State; Asian; State Highways in Tamil Nadu

State Highway 49A (SH-49A), also known as Rajiv Gandhi Salai and Rajiv Gandhi IT Expressway or just IT Expressway, is a major road connecting Chennai, Tamil Nadu state with Mahabalipuram in Chengalpattu district, in the same state. It is 45 km long and was earlier known as the Old Mahabalipuram Road (OMR). The road starts from Madhya Kailash Temple on Sardar Patel Road in South-East Chennai and terminates on East Coast Road near Mahabalipuram.

The prestigious TIDEL Park, home to a number of BPO and IT/ITES companies and many other major IT/ITES Companies in the country, is situated along the Rajiv Gandhi Salai. Prominent technical and educational Institutions, national research laboratories are also located along the Corridor.

Besides, State Industries Promotion Corporation of Tamil Nadu Ltd (SIPCOT) has developed a Cyber City, spread over 2000 acres in Siruseri, abutting the IT Corridor. Many IT/ITES Companies have set up their facilities in the Cyber City.

Based on development and growth of OMR road, it was categorized as 2 major zones. Zone-1 is from Madhya Kailash to Sholinganallur and Zone-2 is from Sholinganallur to Kelambakkam.

== Toll plazas ==
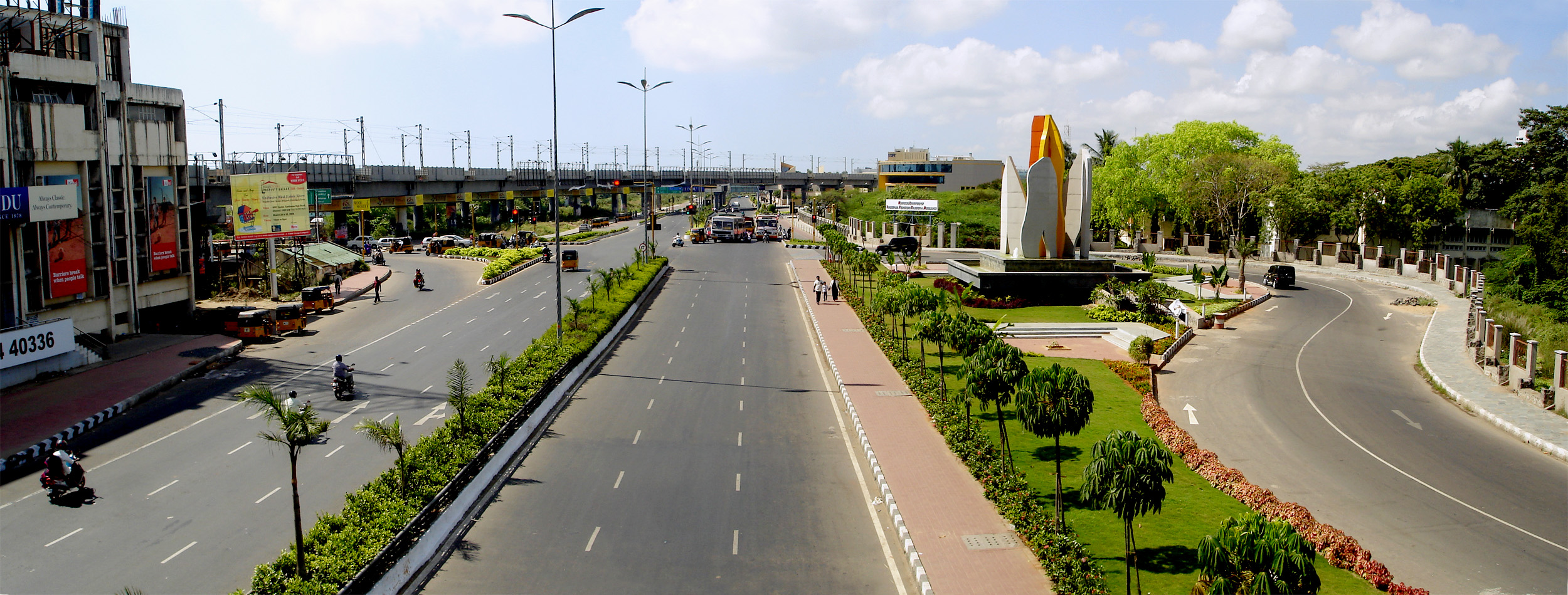
A view of the Rajiv Gandhi Salai at Thiruvanmiyur junction and the Chennai MRTS

There are two toll plazas on OMR and three on the roads leading to OMR.

- Entrance toll plaza at Seevaram (Perungudi)
- Exit plaza at Egattur
- Satellite toll plaza on 200 feet Thoraipakkam-Pallavaram radial road
- Satellite toll plaza on Sholinganallur-Medavakkam link road
- Satellite toll plaza on Sholinganallur-ECR link road (Kalaignar Karunanidhi Salai)

== Gallery ==
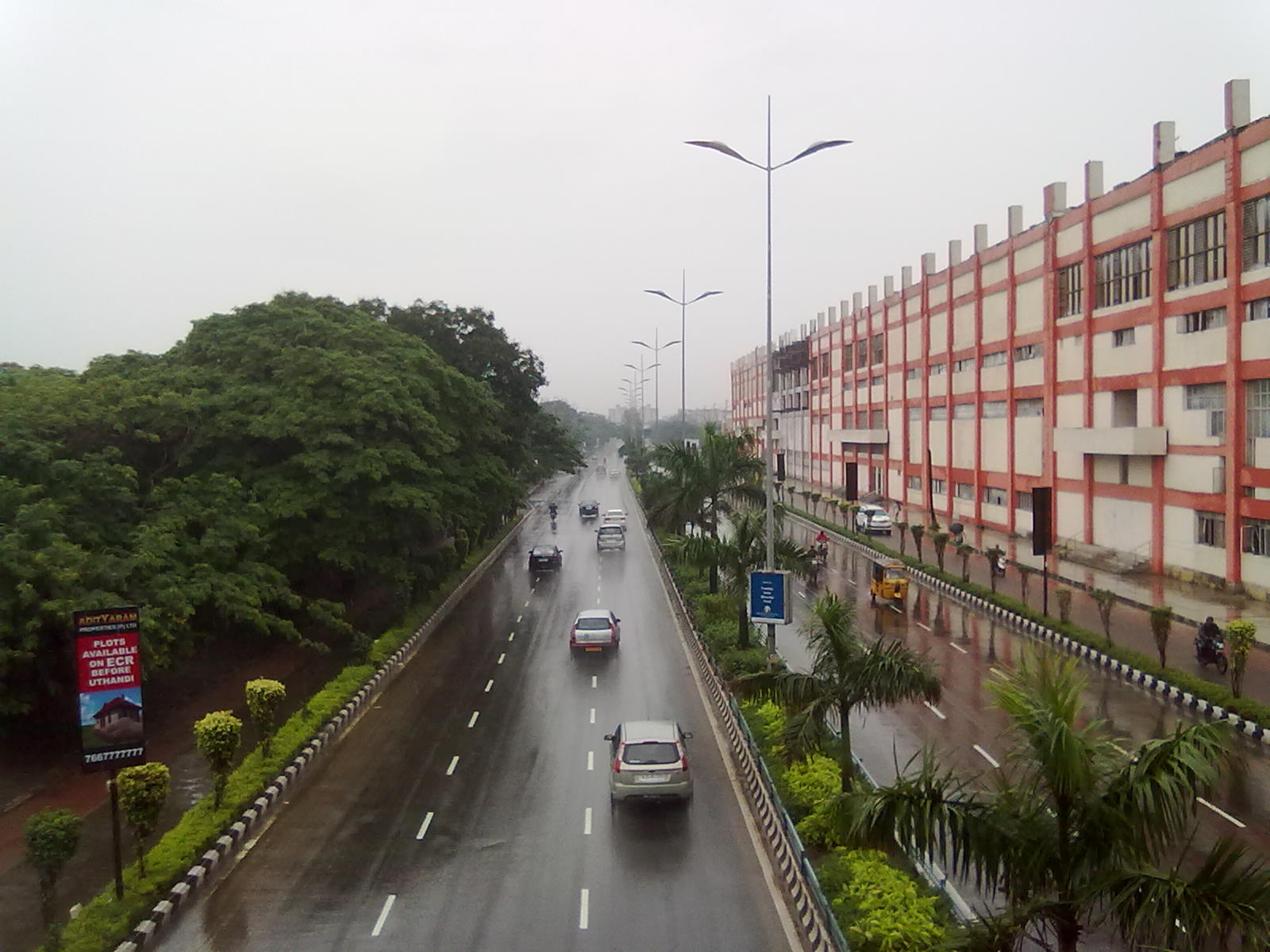
Seen from CIT Campus

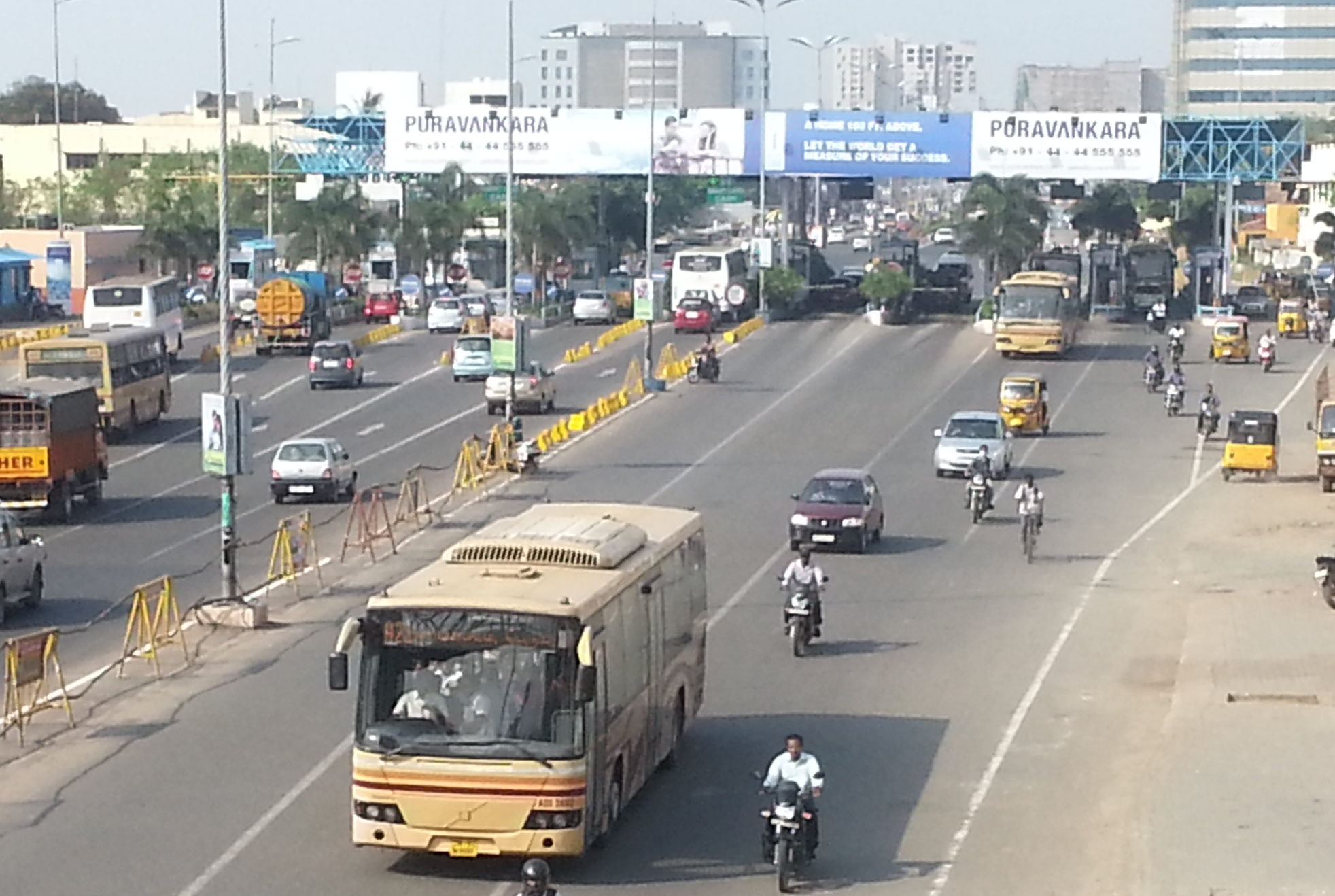
Perungudi Toll Plaza

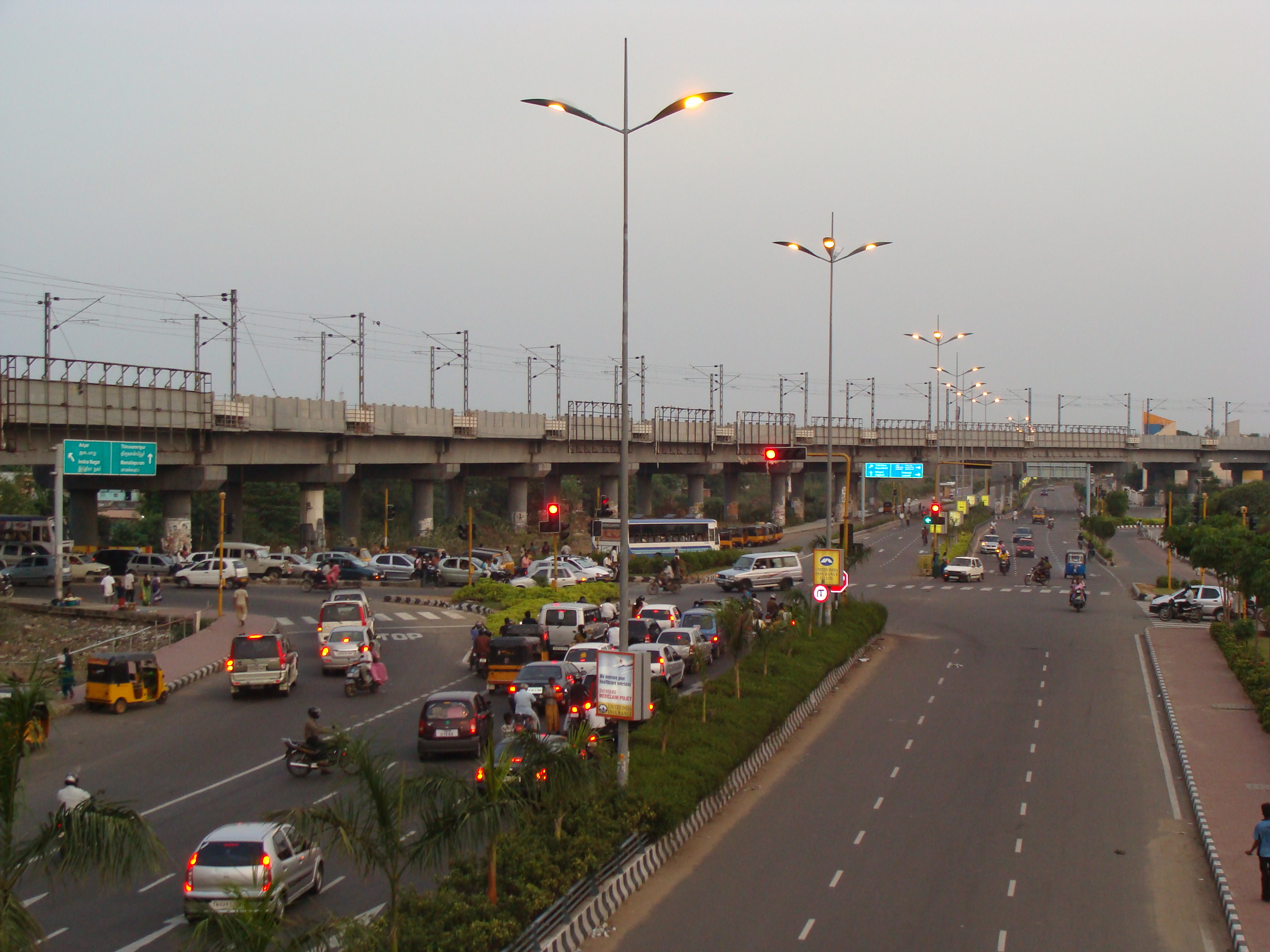
Traffic near TIDEL Park Junction

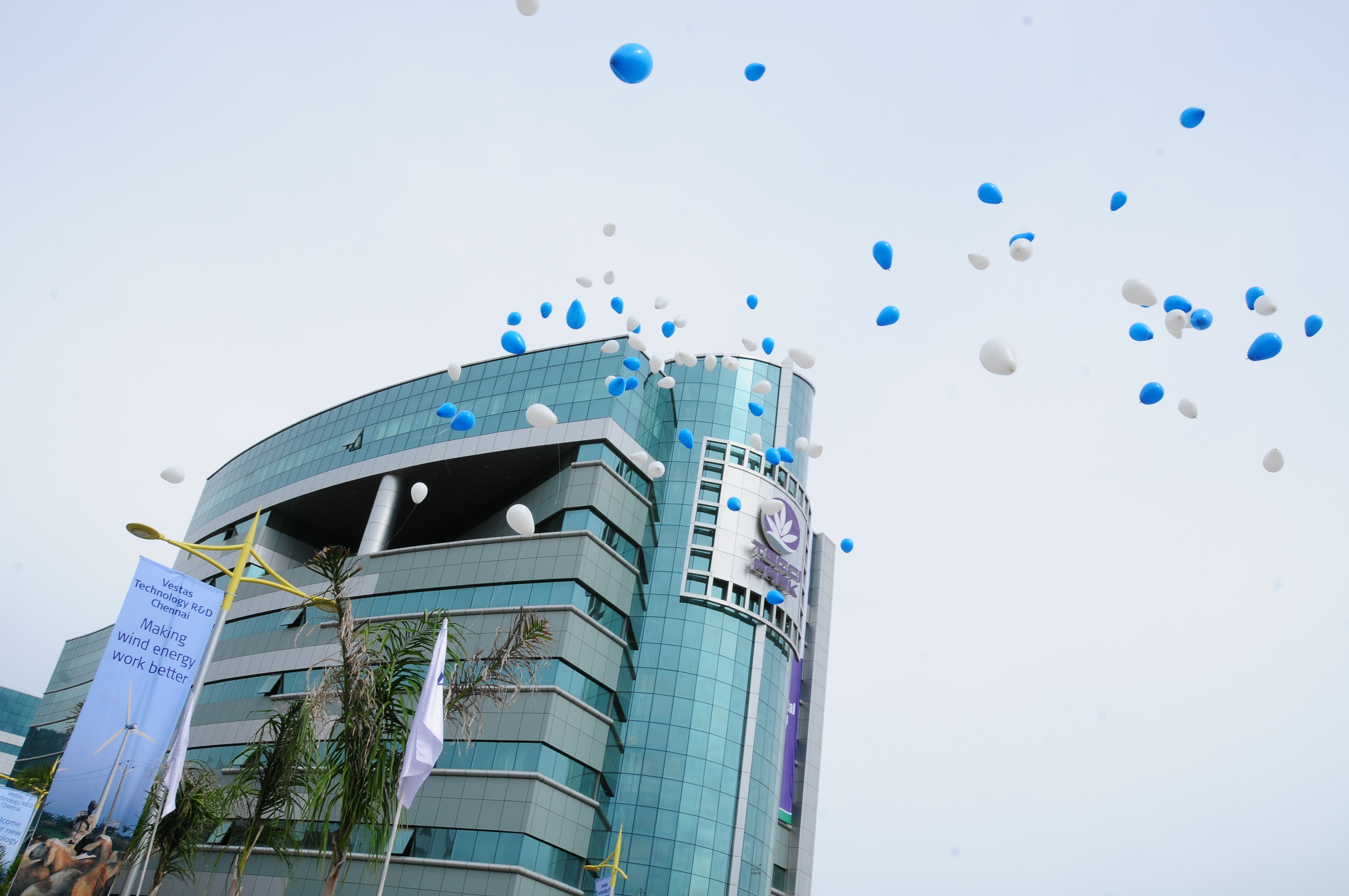
Tecci Park

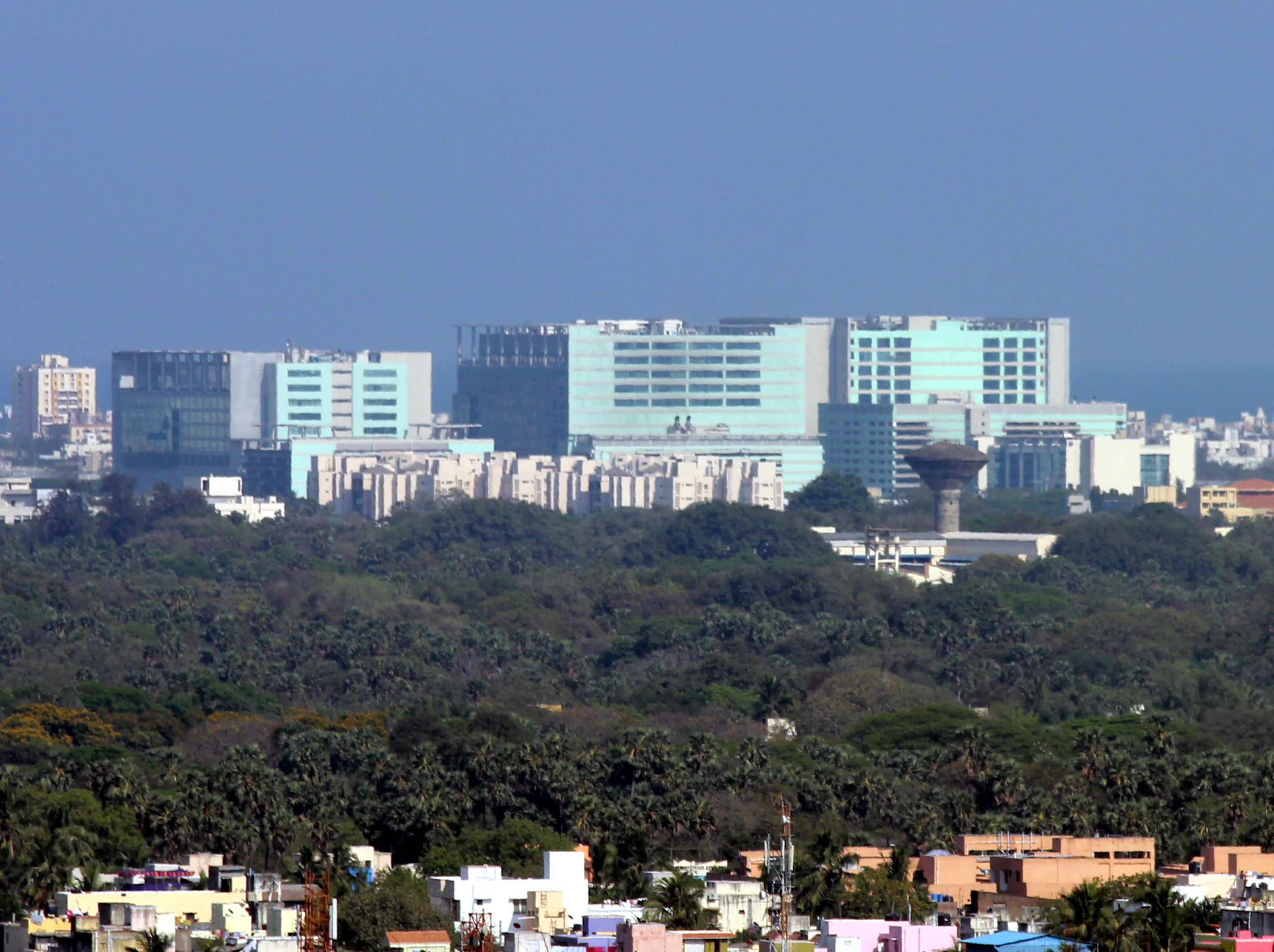
Ascendas IT Park Chennai

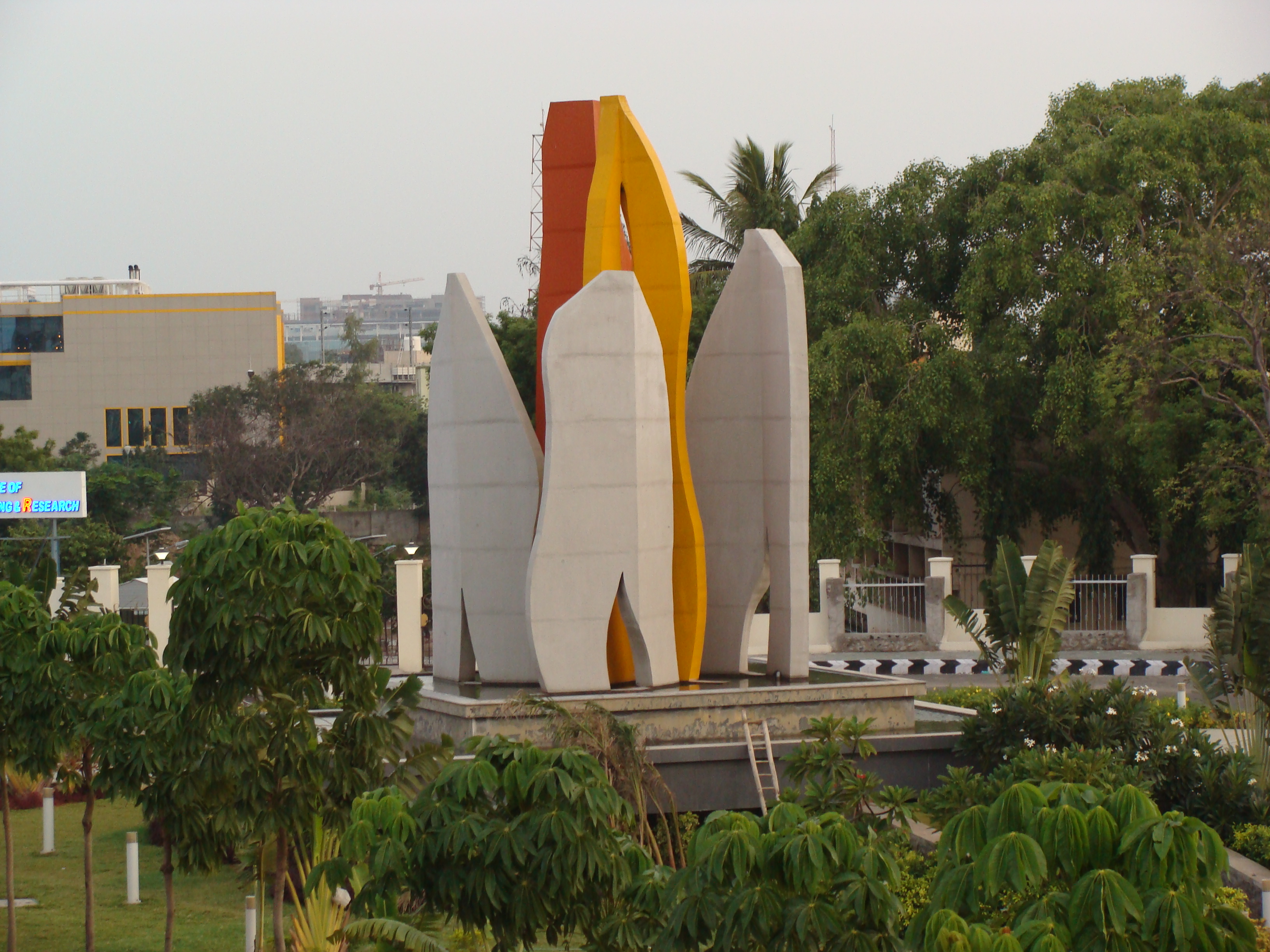
TIDEL Park

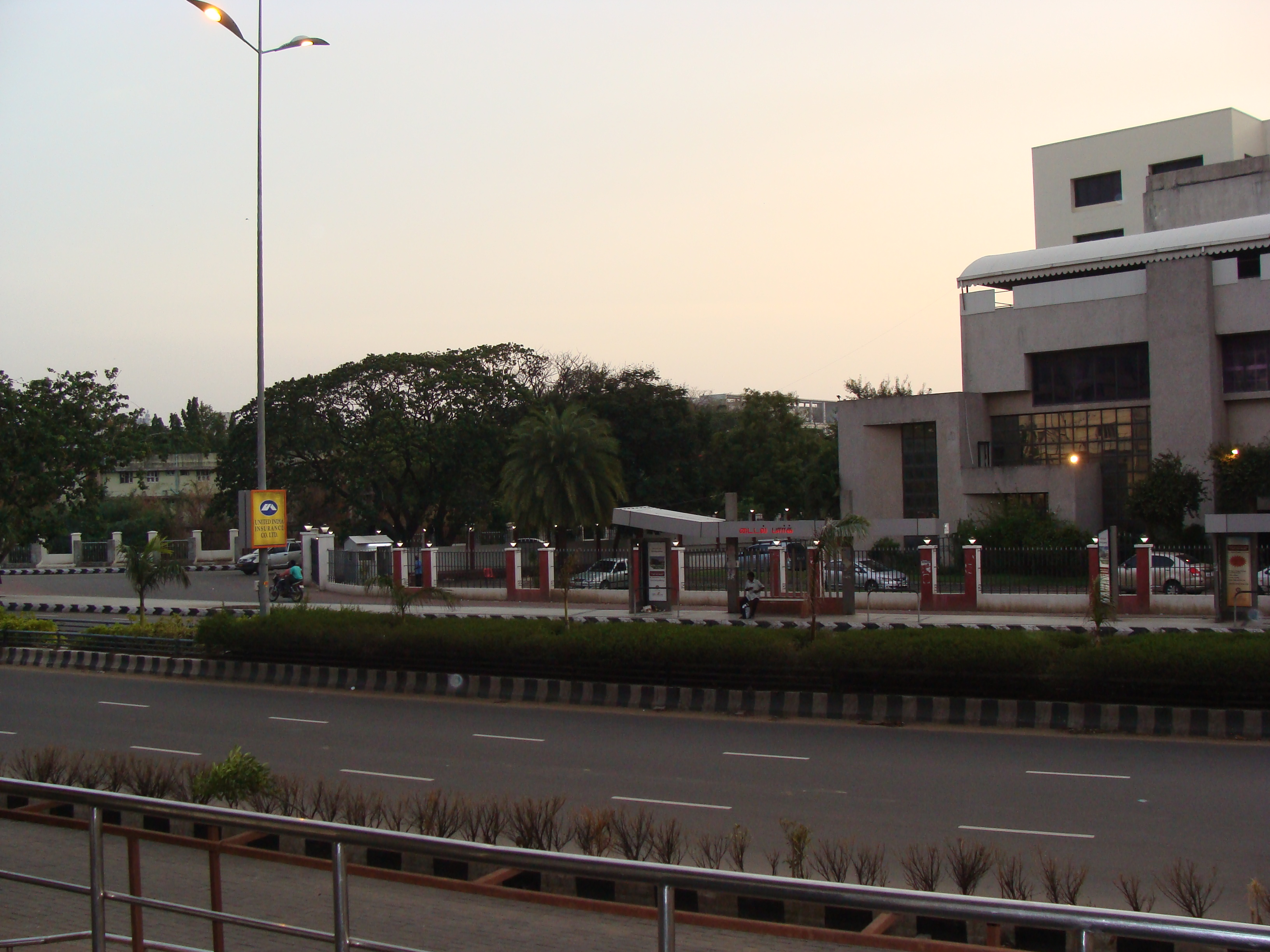
TIDEL Park bus stop

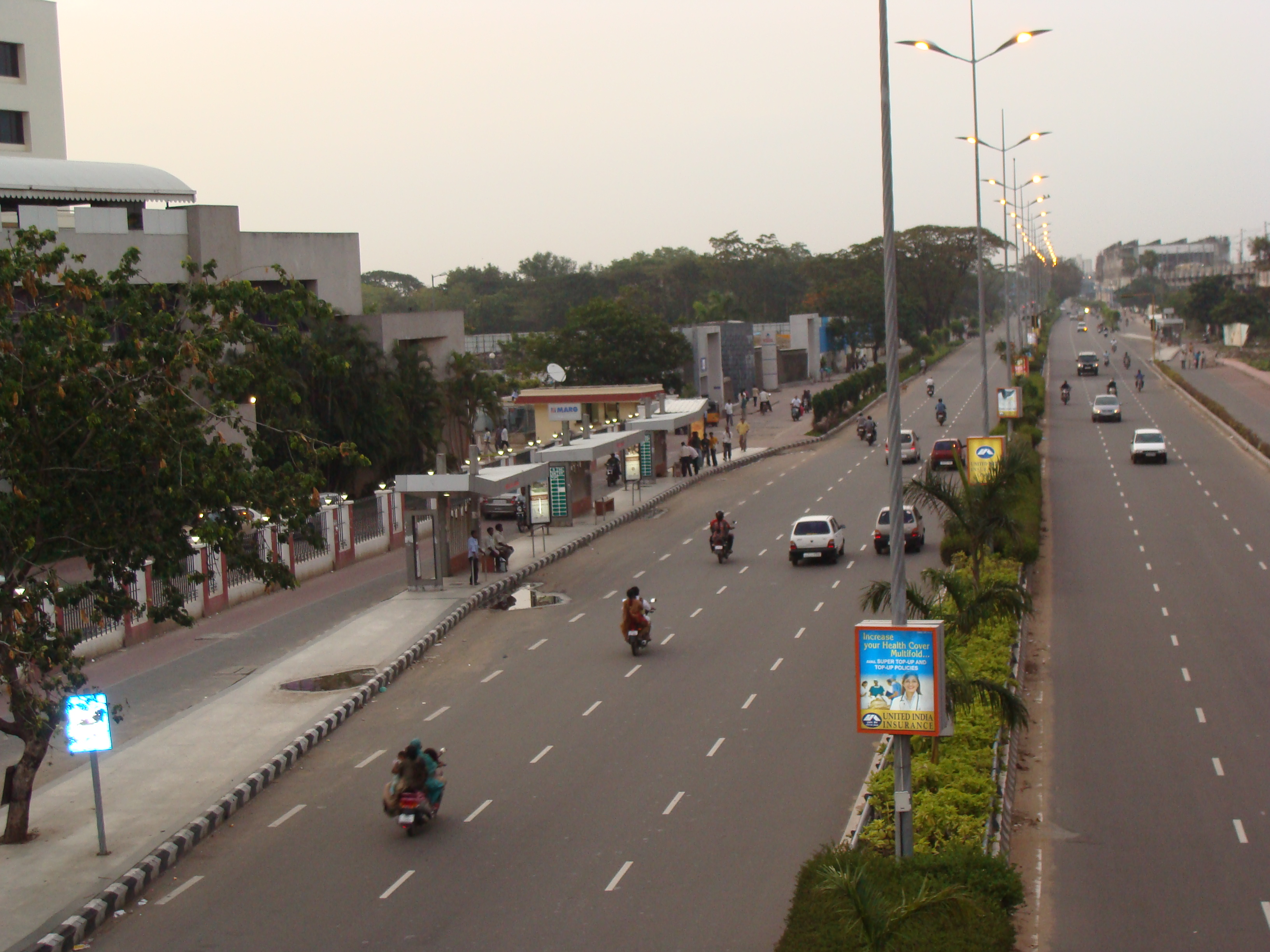
TIDEL Park bus stop (alternate view)

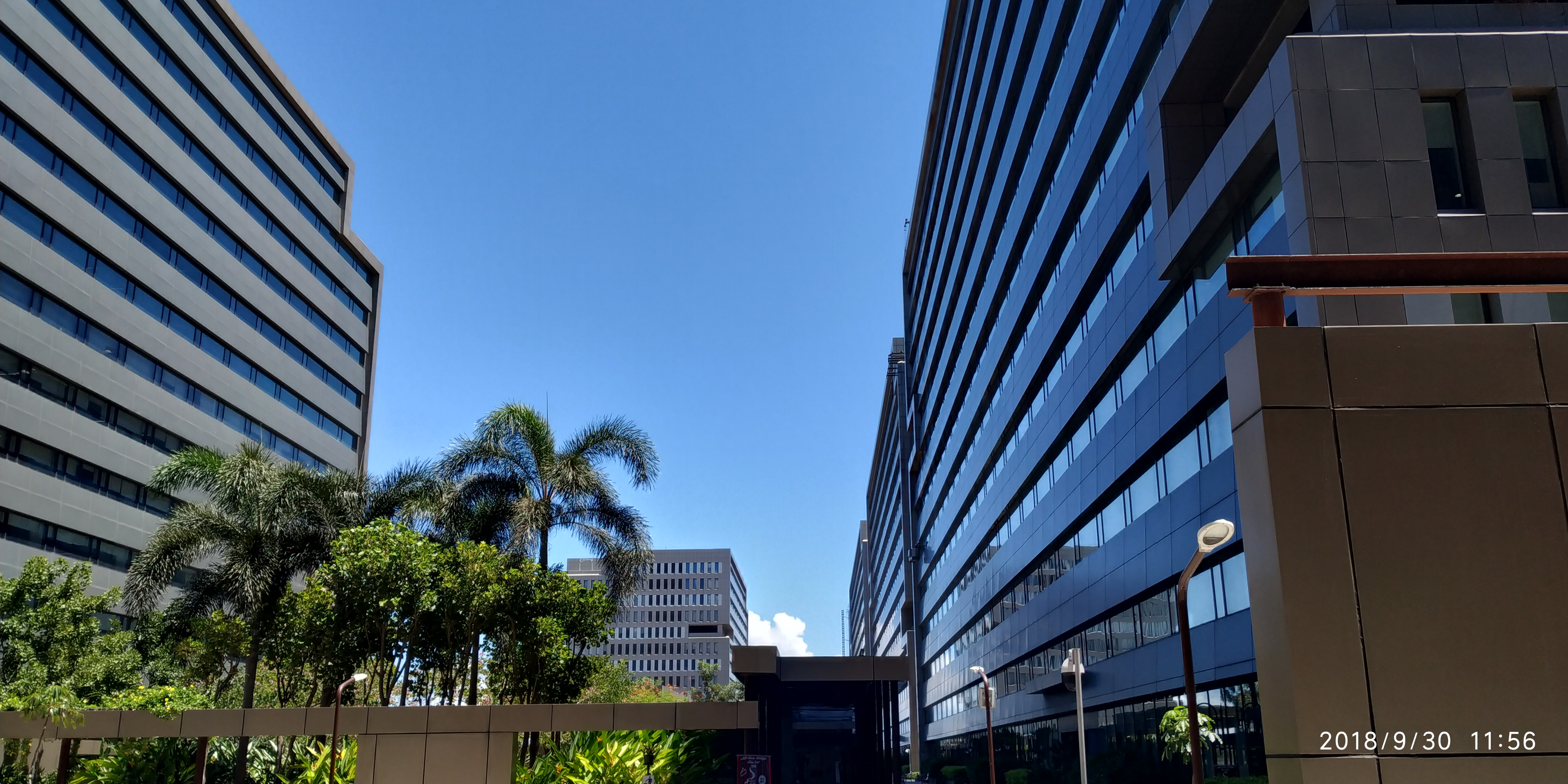
Ramanujan IT City at Taramani, Chennai

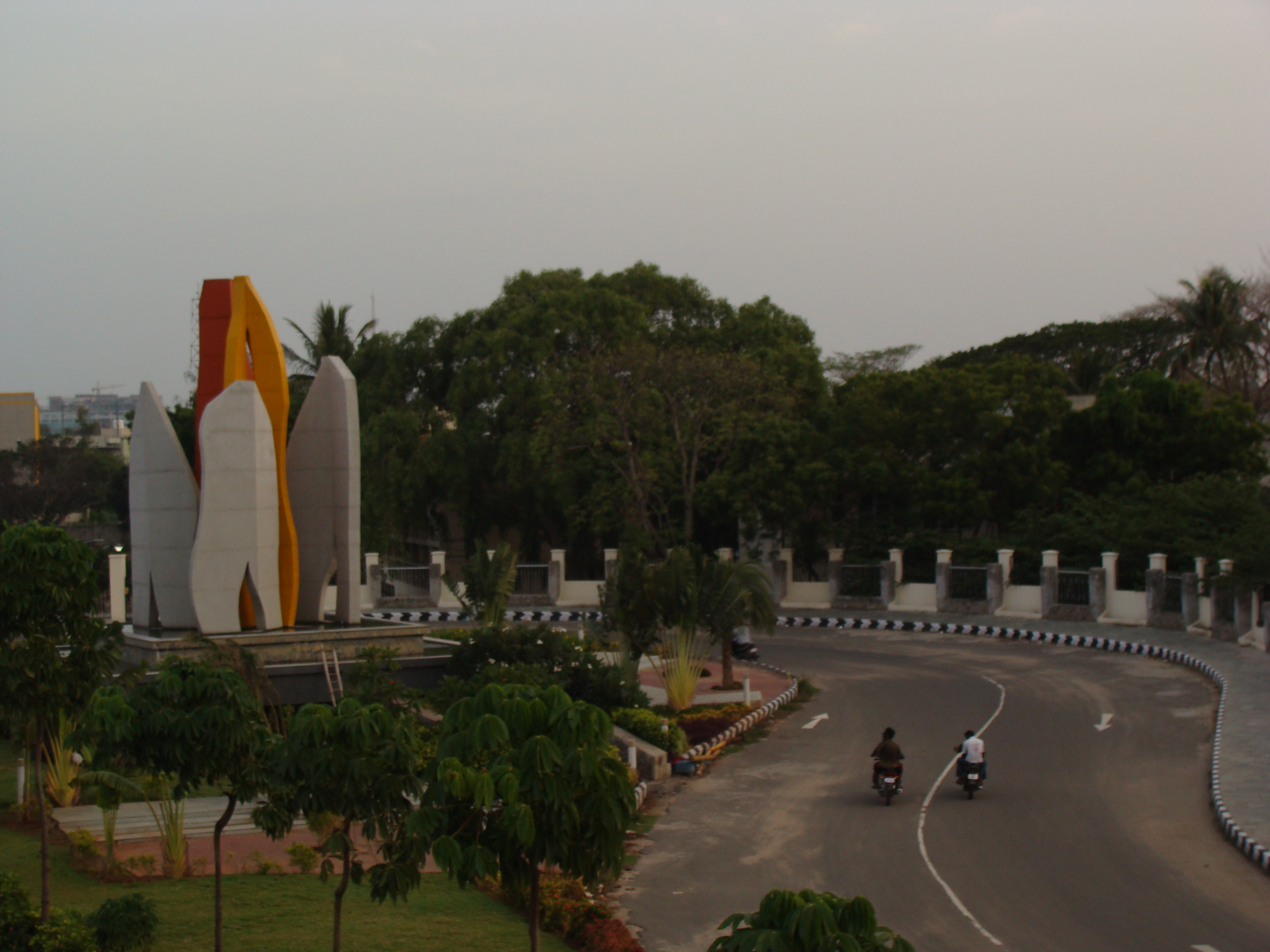
Service road to TIDEL Park

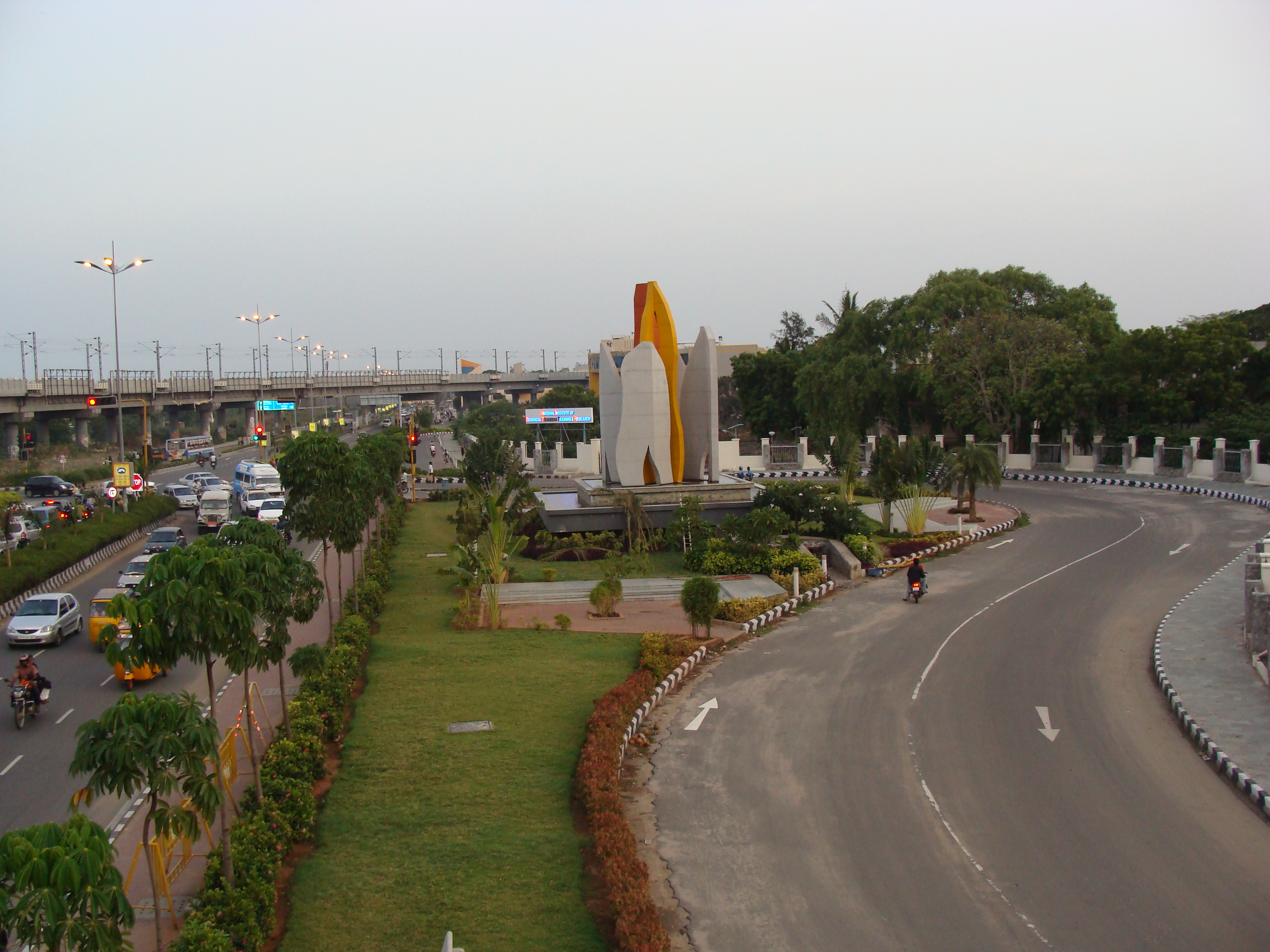
Service road and IT corridor with MRTS line in the background

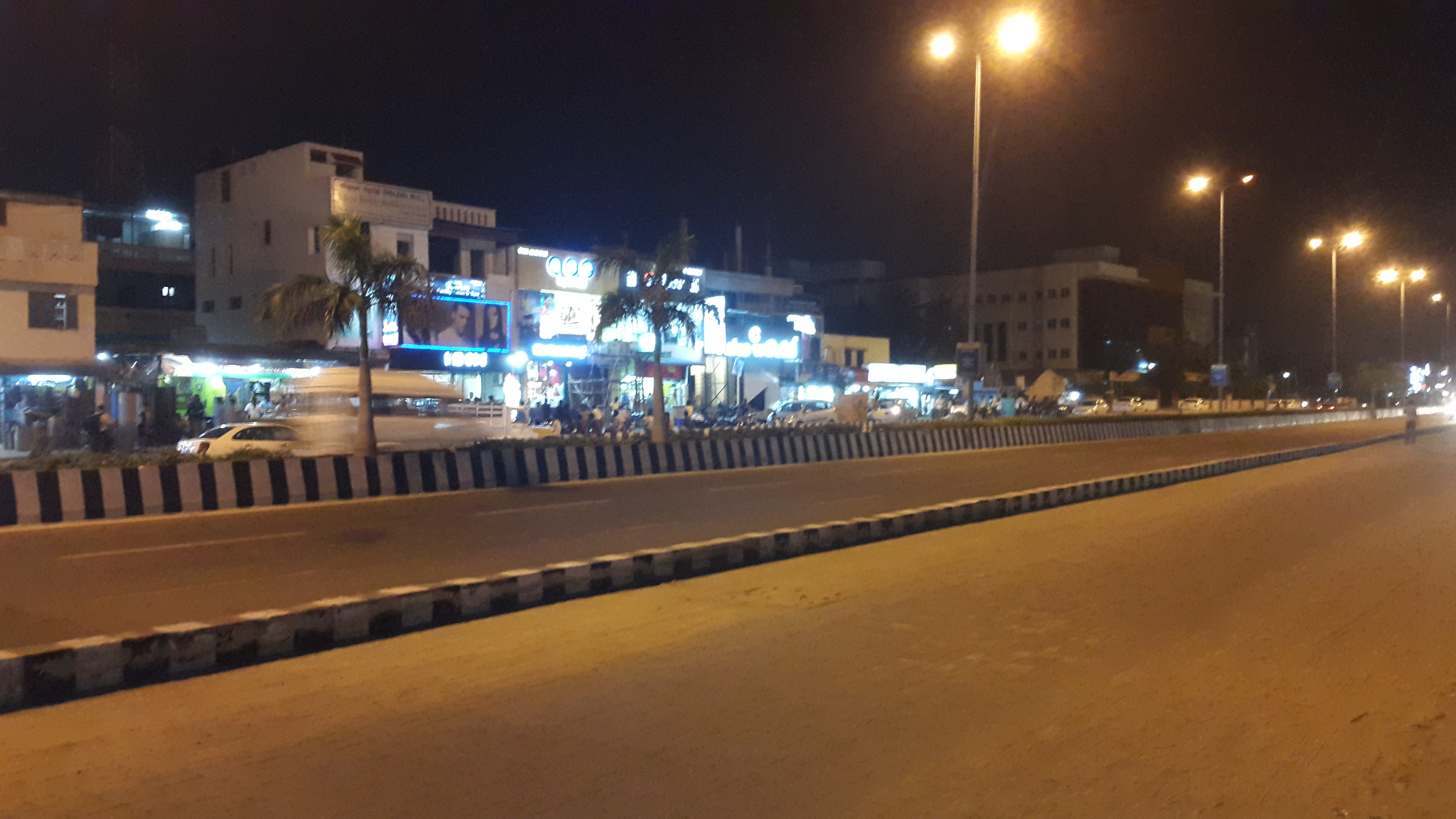
Siruseri SIPCOT

== See also ==
- Transport in Chennai
- List of tech parks in Chennai
