= List of bus routes in Chennai =

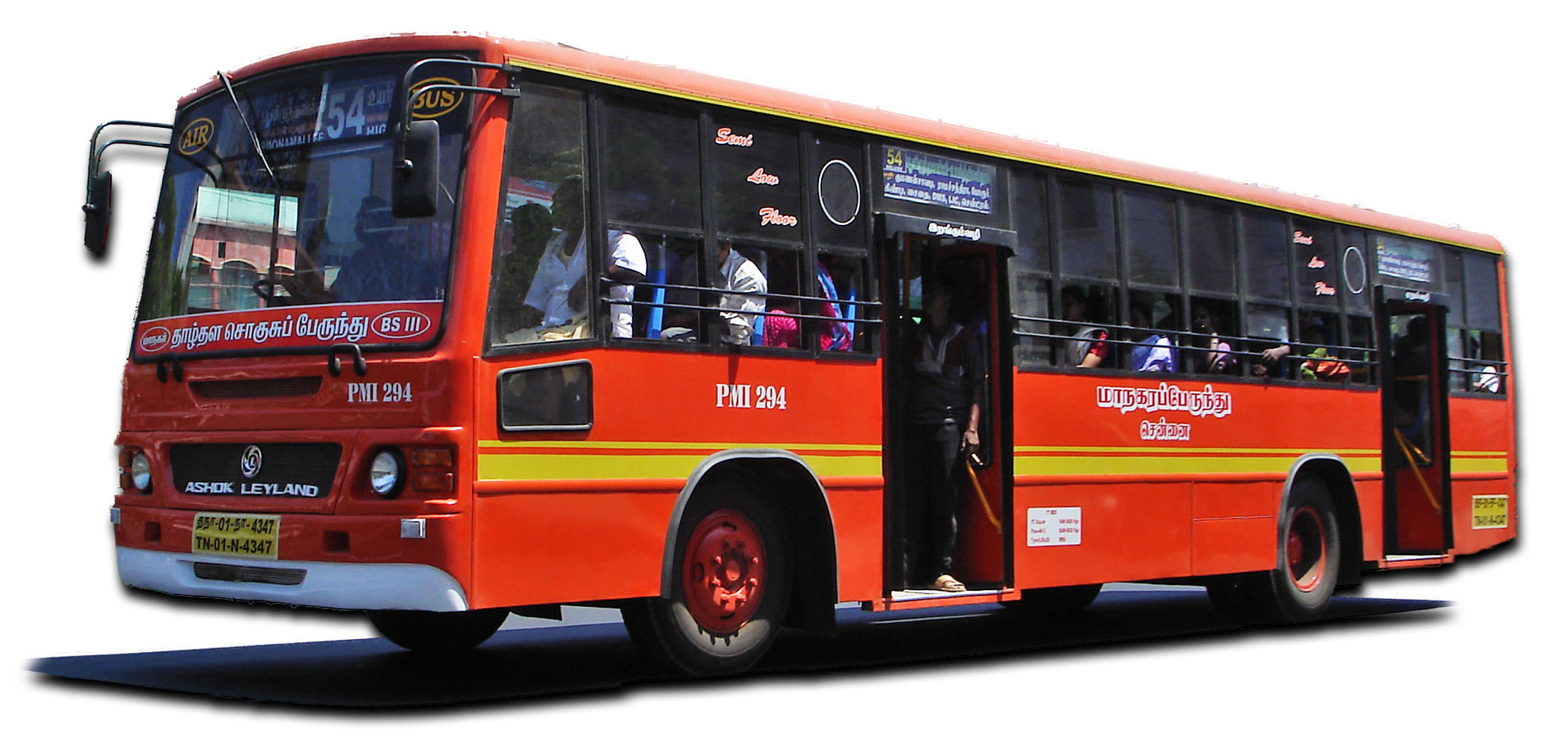
A typical ordinary fare service operated by the Metropolitan Transport Corporation

The Metropolitan Transport Corporation operates intracity public bus service in Chennai, India. Established in 1973, it is a subsidiary of the Tamil Nadu State Transport Corporation, owned by the Government of Tamil Nadu. As of November 2025, it operated 3,233 scheduled services with a fleet of 3,488 buses and carried 3.385 million passengers on an average per day.

== Routes ==
This is a list of bus routes operated by the Metropolitan Transport Corporation.

=== Regular Routes ===
Route	Origin	Destination	Via	Notes
1	Thiruvottriyur	Thiruvanmiyur	Theradi, Tollgate, Kasimedu, Royapuram, Beach Station, Broadway, M.G.R Central, P.OR.R Sons, L.I.C, Royapettah, Mylapore, Mandaveli, Adyar	Bus Operated From Thiruvottriyur, Tondiarpet, Thiruvanmiyur & During Cut Service till Central
1C	Ennore	Thiruvanmiyur	Ernavoor, Wimco Nagar, Thiruvottriyur, Theradi, Tollgate, Kasimedu, Royapuram, Beach Station, Broadway, M.G.R Central, P.OR.R Sons, L.I.C, Royapettah, Mylapore, Mandaveli, Adyar	Bus Operated From Ennore & Thiruvanmiyur & During Cut Service till Broadway
1D	Ennore	Thiruvanmiyur	V.O.C. Nagar, Thalankuppam, Ernavoor Kuppam, Ondikuppam, Kasimedu, Royapuram, Beach Station, High Court, M.G.R Central, P.OR.R Sons, L.I.C, Royapettah, Mylapore, Mandaveli, Adyar	Bus Operated From Ennore
2A	Anna Square	Kaviarasu Kannadasan Nagar	Triplicane, P.OR.R Sons, M.G.R Central, Thirupalli, Basin Bridge, M.K.B Nagar, Sidco	Bus Operated From Madhavaram & Central
2B	Kaviarasu Kannadasan Nagar	Kaviarasu Kannadasan Nagar	Sidco, M.K.B Nagar, Basin Bridge, Park Town, Anna Square, Triplicane, P.OR.R Sons, M.G.R Central, Thirupalli, Basin Bridge, M.K.B Nagar, Sidco	Point To Point Bus & EV Low Floor Bus Operated From Vysarpadi
3	Thiyagaraya Nagar	Thiruvanmiyur	Saidapet, Little Mount, Guindy Race Course, Velachery, Tharamani, S.R.P Tools	Bus Operated From T.Nagar, Adyar, Thiruvanmiyur & Cut Service: Guindy Race Course, Velachery, Tidel Park
4	Ennore	Broadway	V.O.C. Nagar, Thalankuppam, Ernavoor Kuppam, Ondikuppam, Kasimedu, Royapuram, Beach Station	Bus Operated From Ennore & Tondiarpet
4M	Minjur	Broadway	Nandiambakkam, Athipattu Pudhu Nagar, V.O.C. Nagar, Thalankuppam, Ernavoor Kuppam, Ondikuppam, Kasimedu, Royapuram, Beach Station	Bus Operated From Ennore
5B	Thiyagaraya Nagar	Mylapore	Saidapet, Little Mount, Anna University, Madhya Kailash, Adyar, Mandaveli	Bus Operated From T.Nagar & Mandaveli
5C	Broadway	Tharamani	M.G.R Central, P.OR.R Sons, L.I.C, Royapettah, Music Academy, Alwarpet, Adyar Gate, Kotturpuram, Madhya Kailash, Tidel Park	Bus Operated From Central & Adyar
5E	Besant Nagar	Vadapalani	Adyar, Madhya Kailash, Anna University, Little Mount, Saidapet, Mettupalayam, West Saidapet, Ashok Pillar, Kalaignar Nagar, Nesappakam, Amudam	Bus Operated From Vadapalani & Adyar
5G	Thiyagaraya Nagar	Kannagi Nagar S.C.B	Saidapet, Little Mount, Velachery, Tharamani, Kandanchavadi, Perungudi	Bus Operated from Kannagi Nagar
5S	Saidapet	Kannagi Nagar S.C.B	Little Mount, Velachery, Tharamani, Kandanchavadi, Perungudi	Bus Operated from Saidapet
6	Island Grounds	Thiruvanmiyur	Parrys Corner, Secretariat, Marina Beach, Q.M.C, Santhome, Foreshore Estate, Besant Nagar, Indira Nagar	Bus Operated From Central & Thiruvanmiyur. Extended to Island Grounds due to Broadway Station renovations
6D	Tollgate	Thiruvanmiyur	Tondiarpet, Royapuram, Beach Station, Secretariat, Marina Beach, Q.M.C, Santhome, Foreshore Estate, Besant Nagar, Indira Nagar	Bus Operated From Tondiarpet & Thiruvanmiyur
7E	Broadway	Ambathur I.E	M.G.R Central, Periyamedu, Vepery, Purasaivakkam, Kellys, Chinthamani, Roundana, Thirumangalam, Collector Nagar, Vaavin	Bus Operated From Ambathur & Anna Nagar West
7F	Broadway	Anna Nagar West	M.G.R Central, Periyamedu, Vepery, Purasaivakkam, Kellys, Chinthamani, Roundana, Thirumangalam	Bus Operated From Anna Nagar West
7H	Broadway	J.J Nagar East	M.G.R Central, Periyamedu, Vepery, Purasaivakkam, Kellys, Chinthamani, Roundana, Thirumangalam, Collector Nagar	Bus Operated From Anna Nagar West
7K	Broadway	Padi Kuppam	M.G.R Central, Periyamedu, Vepery, Purasaivakkam, Kellys, Chinthamani, Roundana, Thirumangalam	Bus Operated From Anna Nagar West
7M	Broadway	J.J Nagar West	M.G.R Central, Periyamedu, Vepery, Purasaivakkam, Kellys, Chinthamani, Roundana, Thirumangalam, Collector Nagar, Vaavin	Bus Operated From Anna Nagar West
8B	Broadway	Thiru. Vi. Ka Nagar	Beach Station, Thambu Chetty, Vallalar Nagar, Basin Bridge, Pulianthope, Otteri, Jamaliya, Perambur, Venus	Bus Operated From Aynavaram & Perambur
9M	A.G.S Colony	Thiyagaraya Nagar	Guindy, Little Mount, Saidapet, C.I.T Nagar	Bus Operated From Adambakkam
10A	West Saidapet	Tollgate	Mettupalayam, Thiyagaraya Nagar, Valluvar Kottam, Sterling Road, D.P.I, Egmore, M.G.R Central, Broadway, Beach Station, Royapuram, Kasimedu	Bus Operated From Kalaignar Nagar & Sometimes Departure from Broadway
10E	Ekkattuthangal	Broadway	Mettupalayam, Thiyagaraya Nagar, Valluvar Kottam, Sterling Road, D.P.I, Egmore, M.G.R Central	Bus Operated From Kalaignar Nagar
11	Thiyagaraya Nagar	Broadway	Pondy Bazaar, D.M.S, L.I.C, P.OR.R Sons, M.G.R Central	Bus Operated From T.Nagar
11G	Kalaignar Nagar	Broadway	Nesapakkam, Ashok Pillar, Mambalam, Pondy Bazaar, D.M.S, L.I.C, P.OR.R Sons, M.G.R Central	Bus Operated From Kalaignar Nagar
11H	Iyyappanthangal	Broadway	Porur, Valasaravakkam, Kalaignar Nagar, Nesapakkam, Ashok Pillar, Mambalam, Pondy Bazaar, D.M.S, L.I.C, Chepauk, Secretariat	Bus Operated From Iyyapanthangal
11M	Iyyappanthangal	Broadway	Porur, Valasaravakkam, Kalaignar Nagar, Nesapakkam, Ashok Pillar, Mambalam, Pondy Bazaar, D.M.S, L.I.C, P.OR.R Sons, M.G.R Central	Bus Operated From Iyyapanthangal & Kalaignar Nagar
12B	Foreshore Estate	Salingramam	Santhome, Mylapore, Alwarpet, Pondy Bazaar, Bharathi Nagar, Liberty, Vadapalani	Bus Operated From Vadapalani
12G	Kalaignar Nagar	Anna Square	Nesapakkam, Ashok Pillar, Mambalam, Pondy Bazaar, Alwarpet, Luz, Q.M.C, Vivekananda House, Marina Beach	While going Kalaignar Nagar take via Ice House & Operated From Kalaignar Nagar
12M	Iyyappanthangal	Mylapore Luz Corner	Porur, Valasaravakkam, Kalaignar Nagar, Ashok Pillar, Mambalam, Pondy Bazaar, Alwarpet	Bus Operated From Iyyapanthangal & Mandaveli. Short terminated at Luz Corner due to Metro works
12x	Foreshore Estate	M.G.R Koyambedu	Santhome, Mylapore, Alwarpet, Pondy Bazaar, Bharathi Nagar, Liberty, Vadapalani, Arumbakkam Metro	Bus Operated From Mandaveli & Vadapalani
13	Thiyagaraya Nagar	Island Grounds	Vani Mahal, Thousand Lights, Gopalapuram, Royapettah, Pycroft Road, Triplicane, Anna Square, Secretariat, Parrys Corner	Bus Operated From T.Nagar. Extended to Island Grounds due to Broadway Station renovations.
14A	Vallalar Nagar	M.G.R Koyambedu	Choolai, Purasaivakkam, Kellys, Ayanavaram, I.C.F, Kilpauk Garden, N.S K Nagar, Arumbakkam	Bus Operated from Ayanavaram
14M	N.G.O Colony	Medavakkam Koot Road	St. Thomas Mount, Vanuvampet, Kilkattalai, Kovilambakkam, Vellaikal	Bus Operated from Adambakkam
15	M.G.R Koyambedu	Broadway	Arumbakkam, Aminjikarai, K.M.C, Dasaprakash, Egmore North, M.G.R Central	Sometimes bus route known as 15B & Operated From Anna Nagar West
15F	Vadapalani	Broadway	Virugambakkam, Chinmaya Nagar, Koyambedu Market, Arumbakkam, Aminjikarai, K.M.C, Dasaprakash, Egmore North, M.G.R Central	Bus Operated from Central & Vadapalani
15G	M.M.D.A Colony	Broadway	N.S.K Nagar, Aminjikarai, K.M.C, Dasaprakash, Egmore North, M.G.R Central	During EXTN Service till CMBT, Operated from Anna Nagar West
16J	M.G.R Koyambedu	Poonamallee	Chinmaya Nagar, Virugambakkam, Porur, Iyyappanthangal, Kumanan Chavadi	Bus Operated from Vadapalani
16K	M.G.R Koyambedu	Kundrathur	Chinmaya Nagar, Virugambakkam, Porur, Periyapanicherry, Kolachery	Bus Operated from Kundrathur
17D	Kalaignar Nagar	Broadway	Nesapakkam, Ashok Pillar, Liberty, Valluvar Kottam, Sterling Road, D.P.I, Egmore, M.G.R Central	Bus Operated from Central & Kalaignar Nagar
17E	Saligramam	Broadway	Vadapalani, Liberty, Valluvar Kottam, Sterling Road, D.P.I, Egmore, Chintadripet, P.OR.R Sons, M.G.R Central	Bus Operated from Vadapalani
17K	Dasarathapuram	Broadway	Vadapalani, Liberty, Valluvar Kottam, Sterling Road, D.P.I, Egmore, Chindathripet, P.OR.R Sons, M.G.R Central	Bus Operated from Vadapalani
18A	Broadway	Kilambakkam (K.C.B.T)	M.G.R Central, P.OR.R Sons, L.I.C, D.M.S, Teynampet, Nandanam, Saidapet, Little Mount, Guindy, Alandur Metro, Arignar Anna International Airport, Pallavaram, Chromepet, Tambaram, Perungalathur, Vandaloor Zoo	Bus Operated from Kilambakkam, Tambaram, Alandur, Saidapet, Central & for EV Bus from Vysarpadi
18B	Broadway	Kotturpuram	M.G.R Central, P.OR.R Sons, L.I.C, D.M.S, Teynampet, Nandanam, Saidapet, Little Mount, Anna University	Bus Operated from Saidapet
18D	Broadway	Kilkattalai	M.G.R Central, P.OR.R Sons, L.I.C, D.M.S, Teynampet, Nandanam, Saidapet, Little Mount, Guindy, N.G.O Colony, St. Thomas Mount, Vanuvampet	Bus Operated from Adambakkam
18E	Broadway	Ramapuram	M.G.R Central, P.OR.R Sons, L.I.C, D.M.S, Teynampet, Nandanam, Saidapet, Little Mount, Guindy, Kathipara	Bus Operated from Alandur
18H	Tambaram	Naduveerapattu	Kannadapalayam, Pazhanthandalam, Poonthandalam, Nallur, Somangalam	Bus Operated from Tambaram
18K	Broadway	West Saidapet	M.G.R Central, P.OR.R Sons, L.I.C, D.M.S, Teynampet, Nandanam, Mettupalayam	Bus Operated from Central & Kalaignar Nagar
18L	Tambaram	Neelamangalam	Perungalathur, Vandaloor Zoo, Kilambakkam (K.C.B.T), Guduvanchery, Madambakkam, Kuthanur	Bus Operated from Tambaram
18N	Broadway	Kilkattalai	M.G.R Central, P.OR.R Sons, L.I.C, D.M.S, Teynampet, Nandanam, Saidapet, Little Mount, Guindy, Alandur Metro, Pazhavanthangal, Nanganallur	Bus Operated from Alandur
18P	Broadway	Kilkattalai	M.G.R Central, P.OR.R Sons, L.I.C, D.M.S, Teynampet, Nandanam, Saidapet, Little Mount, Guindy, N.G.O Colony, Adambakkam, Puzhuthivakkam, Vanuvampet	Bus Operated from Saidapet
18R	Broadway	Nanganallur	M.G.R Central, P.OR.R Sons, L.I.C, D.M.S, Teynampet, Nandanam, Saidapet, Little Mount, Guindy, Alandur Metro, Pazhavanthangal	Bus Operated from Alandur
18x	Broadway	Oonamancherry	M.G.R Central, P.OR.R Sons, L.I.C, D.M.S, Teynampet, Nandanam, Saidapet, Little Mount, Guindy, Alandur Metro, Arignar Anna International Airport, Pallavaram, Chromepet, Tambaram, Perungalathur, Nedungundram, Kolapakkam	Bus Operated from Tambaram
19	Thiyagaraya Nagar	Thiruporur	Saidapet, Little Mount, Anna University, Madhya Kailash, Kandanchavadi, Perungudi, Sholinganallur, Chemmanchery, Navalur, Siruchery, Padur, Kelambakkam	Bus Operated from T. Nagar, Adyar & (Electric & AC Bus) from Perumbakkam
19A	Thiyagaraya Nagar	Chemmanchery S.C.B	Saidapet, Little Mount, Anna University, Madhya Kailash, Kandanchavadi, Perungudi, Sholinganallur, Nucleus Company	Bus Operated from Chemmanchery
19B	Saidapet	Kelambakkam	Little Mount, Anna University, Madhya Kailash, Kandanchavadi, Perungudi, Sholinganallur, Chemmanchery, Navalur, Siruchery, Padur	Bus Operated from Saidapet
19C	Thiyagaraya Nagar	Okkiyam Thoraipakkam Sec. Colony	Saidapet, Little Mount, Anna University, Madhya Kailash, Kandanchavadi, Perungudi	
19D	Adyar	Chemmanchery S.C.B	S.R.P Tools, Kandanchavadi, Perungudi, Sholinganallur, Nucleus Company	
19G (CT)	West Saidapet	Kovalam	Mettupalayam, Saidapet, Little Mount, Anna University, Madhya Kailash, Adyar, Thiruvanmiyur, Palavakkam, Neelankarai, Injambakkam, Kanathur, Muttukadu	Actual Cut Service in Regular Routes, Operated from Kalaignar Nagar
19P	Adyar	Kelambakkam	S.R.P Tools, Kandanchavadi, Perungudi, Sholinganallur, Chemmanchery, Navalur, Thalambur, Pudupakkam	
19T	Thiyagaraya Nagar	Kovalam	Saidapet, Little Mount, Anna University, Madhya Kailash, Adyar, Thiruvanmiyur, Palavakkam, Neelankarai, Injambakkam, Kanathur, Muttukadu	
19V	Sholinganallur	Vandaloor Zoo	Chemmanchery, Navalur, Siruchery I.T Park, Pudupakkam, Mambakkam, Kandigai, Kolapakkam	
20	Broadway	I.C.F	M.G.R Central, Egmore North, Dasaprakash, Purasaivakkam, Kellys, Ayanavaram	The bus towards Villivakkam bus terminus is shifted to ICF due to metro rail construction.
20A	Broadway	J.J Nagar East	M.G.R Central, Egmore North, Dasaprakash, Purasaivakkam, Kellys, Ayanavaram, I.C.F, Sidco Nagar, Korattur, Ambathur I.E, J.J Nagar West	
20D	Broadway	Sidco Nagar	M.G.R Central, Egmore North, Dasaprakash, Purasaivakkam, Kellys, Ayanavaram, I.C.F	
20P	Ambathur I.E	Poonamallee	Dunlop, Athipet I.C.F Colony, Athipet Junction, Ayanambakkam, Vanagaram, Kumanan Chavadi	
21	Broadway	Mandaveli MRTS	M.G.R Central, P.OR.R Sons, L.I.C, Royapettah, Mylapore	The bus towards Mandaveli bus terminus is shifted to Mandaveli MRTS due to metro rail construction.
21C	Broadway	Kannagi Nagar S.C.B	M.G.R Central, P.OR.R Sons, L.I.C, Royapettah, Mylapore, Mandaveli, Adyar, S.R.P Tools, Perungudi	
21E	Island Grounds	Ramapuram	Parrys Corner, Secretariat, Chepauk, Foreshore Estate, MRC Nagar, Adayar, Guindy, Kathipara	Extended to Island Grounds due to Broadway Station renovations.
21G	Island Grounds	Kilambakkam (K.C.B.T)	Parrys Corner, Secretariat, Marina Beach, Q.M.C, Mylapore, Mandaveli, Adyar Gate, Kotturpuram, Anna University, Guindy, Alandur Metro, Arignar Anna International Airport, Pallavaram, Chromepet, Tambaram, Perungalathur, Vandaloor Zoo	Extended to Island Grounds due to Broadway Station renovations.
21L	Island Grounds	Madipakkam	Parrys Corner,Secretariat, Marina Beach, Q.M.C, Santhome, Foreshore Estate, Adyar, Madhya Kailash, Anna University, Checkpost, Velachery Vijayanagar, Velachery Railway Station	Extended to Island Grounds due to Broadway Station renovations.
22	Anna Square	Korattur	Triplicane, Pudupet, Egmore, Dasaprakash, Purasaivakkam, Kellys, Ayanavaram, I.C.F, Sidco Nagar, Padi, Lucas	
23C	Besant Nagar	Ayanavaram	Adyar, Madhya Kailash, Anna University, Little Mount, Saidapet, Nandanam, Teynampet, D.M.S, L.I.C, Pudupet, Egmore, Dasaprakash, Purasaivakkam, Kellys	
23V	Velachery	I.C.F	Checkpost, Little Mount, Saidapet, Nandanam, Teynampet, D.M.S, L.I.C, Pudupet, Egmore, Dasaprakash, Purasaivakkam, Kellys, Ayanavaram	The bus towards Villivakkam bus terminus is halted until ICF due to metro rail construction.
24A	Vivekananda House	Korattur	Royapettah, Gemini, Sterling Road, Chetpet, Aminjikarai, Shenoy Nagar, Chinthamani, Anna Nagar West, Lucas	
25	Anna Square	Poonamallee	Marina Beach, Vivekananda House, Royapettah, Gemini, Palmgrove, Liberty, Vadapalani, Valasaravakkam, Porur, Iyyappanthangal, Kumanan Chavadi	
26	Broadway	Iyyappanthangal	M.G.R Central, P.OR.R Sons, L.I.C, Gemini, Palmgrove, Liberty, Vadapalani, Valasaravakkam, Porur	
26B	Broadway	Mangadu	M.G.R Central, P.OR.R Sons, L.I.C, Gemini, Palmgrove, Liberty, Vadapalani, Valasaravakkam, Porur, Pattur	
26M	Broadway	Mugalivakkam	M.G.R Central, P.OR.R Sons, L.I.C, Gemini, Palmgrove, Liberty, Vadapalani, Valasaravakkam, Porur	
26R	Broadway	Mugalivakkam	M.G.R Central, P.OR.R Sons, L.I.C, Gemini, Palmgrove, Liberty, Vadapalani, Virugambakkam, Kalaignar Nagar West, Rayala Nagar, D.L.F	
27B	Anna Square	M.G.R Koyambedu	Triplicane, P.OR.R Sons, Chindathiripet, Egmore, Chetpet, Aminjikarai, N.S.K Nagar, Arumbakkam	
27D	Foreshore Estate	I.C.F	Santhome, Q.M.C, Stella Marry College, L.I.C, Pudupet, Egmore, Dasaprakash, Purasaivakkam, Kellys, Ayanavaram	The bus towards Villivakkam bus terminus is halted until ICF due to metro rail construction.
28	Thiruvottriyur	Egmore North	Theradi, Tollgate, Tondiarpet, Vallalar Nagar, Thirupalli, M.G.R Central, P.OR.R Sons, Chindathiripet	
28A	Manali New Town	Egmore North	Elanthur, Sathangadu, Wimco Nagar, Thiruvottriyur, Theradi, Tollgate, Tondiarpet, Vallalar Nagar, Thirupalli, M.G.R Central, P.OR.R Sons, Chindathiripet	
28B	Ennore	Egmore North	Ernavoor, Wimco Nagar, Thiruvottriyur, Theradi, Tollgate, Tondiarpet, Vallalar Nagar, Thirupalli, M.G.R Central, P.OR.R Sons, Chindathiripet	
28C	Tollgate,	Quaid-E-Millath Arts College	Tondiarpet, Vallalar Nagar, Thirupalli, M.G.R Central, P.OR.R Sons, L.I.C	
29A	Anna Square	Perambur	Triplicane, Pudupet, Egmore, Dasaprakash, Purasaivakkam, Doveton, Otteri, Jamaliya	
29B	Saidapet	Perambur	Thiyagaraya Nagar, Pondy Bazaar, D.M.S, Gemini, Sterling Road, Chetpet, K.M.C, Purasaivakkam, Doveton, Otteri, Jamaliya	
29C	Besant Nagar	Perambur	Adyar, Mandaveli, Mylapore, Stella Mary College, Gemini, Sterling Road, Chetpet, K.M.C, Purasaivakkam, Otteri, Jamaliya	
29D	Vivekananda House	Mathur M.M.D.A	Ratna Cafe, Pudupet, Egmore, Dasaprakash, Purasaivakkam, Doveton, Otteri, Jamaliya, Perambur, Moolakadai, Madhavaram Milk Colony	
29E	Thiruverkadu	Perambur	Gurumedai, Perumal Nagar Junction, Velappanchavadi, Maduravoyal, Rohini Theatre, Arumbakkam, Aminjikarai, Kellys, Purasaivakkam, Otteri, Jamaliya	
29N	Velachery	Peruvallur Kumaran Nagar	Check Post, Little Mount, Saidapet, Thiyagaraya Nagar, Pondy Bazaar, D.M.S, Gemini, Sterling Road, Chetpet, K.M.C, Dasaprakash, Purasaivakkam, Doveton, Pattalam, Otteri, Jamaliya, Perambur, Venus, Kolathur	
31A	Tambaram West	Agaramthen	Tambaram East, Selaiyur, Balaji Nagar, Siruvapuri, Madha Kovil	
31B	Tambaram West	Kandigai	Tambaram East, Selaiyur, Balaji Nagar, Siruvapuri, Madha Kovil, Sathya Nagar	
31G	Tambaram West	Medavakkam Koot Road	Tambaram East, Selaiyur, Mahalakshmi Nagar, Madambakkam Koil, Noothanchery, Vengaivasal	
31M	Tambaram West	Madurapakkam	Tambaram East, Selaiyur, Balaji Nagar, Siruvapuri, Madha Kovil, Agaramthen, Kovilamcherry	
31P	Tambaram West	Ponmar	Tambaram East, Selaiyur, Balaji Nagar, Siruvapuri, Madha Kovil, Agaramthen, Kovilamcherry, Madurapakkam	
32A	Foreshore Estate	Tollgate,	Santhome, Dr. Ambedkar Bridge, Q.M.C, Vivekananda House, Ratna Cafe, P.OR.R Sons, M.G.R Central, Broadway, Mannady, Vallalar Nagar, Tondiarpet	
32B	Vivekananda House	Korukkupet	Ratna Cafe, P.OR.R Sons, M.G.R Central, Broadway, Mannady, Vallalar Nagar	
33B	Broadway	Kaviarasu Kannadasan Nagar	Mannady, Vallalar Nagar, Basin Bridge, Vyasarpadi, M.K.B Nagar, Sidco	
33C	Broadway	Kaviarasu Kannadasan Nagar	Beach Station, Thambu Chetty, Vallalar Nagar, Basin Bridge, Sathyamoorthi Nagar, M.K.B Nagar, Sidco	
33L	Broadway	Kodungaiyur Parvathi Nagar	Beach Station, Thambu Chetty, Vallalar Nagar, Basin Bridge, Vyasarpadi, M.K.B Nagar, Sidco, Karikadai	
34	Thiruvottriyur	Ambathur I.E	Theradi, Tollgate, Tondiarpet, Vallalar Nagar, Basin Bridge, Choolai, Purasaivakkam, Kellys, Chinthamani, Roundana, Thirumangalam, Collector Nagar, Vaavin	
35	Broadway	Korattur	M.G.R Central, Periyamedu, Vepery, Doveton, Otteri, Ayanavaram, I.C.F, Sidco Nagar, Padi, Lucas	
35C	Broadway	Korattur	M.G.R Central, Choolai, Doveton, Otteri, Ayanavaram, I.C.F, Sidco Nagar, Padi, Lucas	
36K	Tollgate,	Redhills	Theradi, Thiruvottriyur, Wimco Nagar, Sathangadu, M.F.L, Elanthanur, Kanniamman Pettai, Kannampalayam, Kalamedu, Vadakarai	
36M	Vallalar Nagar	Vichoor	Tondiarpet, Tollgate, Theradi, Thiruvottriyur, Wimco Nagar, Sathangadu, Elanthur	
36	Thiruvottriyur	Redhills	Wimco Nagar, Jothi Nagar, M.F.L, Manali Market, Mathur Gate, Chettipedu, Vinayagapuram, Vadakarai	
37	Vallalar Nagar	Poonamallee	Basin Bridge, Choolai, Purasaivakkam, Dasaprakash, K.M.C, Chetpet, Sterling Road, Valluvar Kottam, Liberty, Vadapalani, Valasaravakkam, Porur, Iyyappanthangal, Kumanan Chavadi	
37E	Kaviarasu Kannadasan Nagar	Iyyappanthangal	M.K.B Nagar, Sidco, Kannigapuram, Pattalam, Doveton, Vepery, Egmore, D.P.I, Sterling Road, Valluvar Kottam, Liberty, Vadapalani, Valasaravakkam, Porur	
37G	Vallalar Nagar	Iyyappanthangal	Basin Bridge, Choolai, Purasaivakkam, Dasaprakash, K.M.C, Chetpet, Sterling Road, Valluvar Kottam, Liberty, Vadapalani, Valasaravakkam, Porur	
38A	Broadway	Manali	Beach Station, Thambu Chetty, Vallalar Nagar, Basin Bridge, Vyasarpadi, Erukancherry, Moolakadai, Madhavaram Milk Colony, Mathur	
38C	Vivekananda House	Thiru. Vi. Ka Nagar	Ratna Cafe, P.OR.R Sons, M.G.R Central, Choolai, Vepery, Doveton, Otteri, Jamaliya, Perambur, Venus	
38D	Thiruvottriyur	Kodungaiyur Parvathi Nagar	Theradi, Tollgate, Tondiarpet, Vallalar Nagar, Basin Bridge, M.K.B Nagar, Sidco, Karikadai	
38G	Broadway	Vazhuthalambedu	Beach Station, Thambu Chetty, Vallalar Nagar, Basin Bridge, Vyasarpadi, Erukancherry, Moolakadai, Vathiyar Thottam, Chettimedu, Arumandai Road Junction	
38H	Broadway	Madhavaram	Beach Station, Thambu Chetty, Vallalar Nagar, Basin Bridge, Vyasarpadi, Erukancherry, Moolakadai	
40A	Pattabiram	Anna Square	Kavarapalayam, Avadi, Thirumullaivoyal, Ambathur O.T, Ambathur I.E, Collector Nagar, Thirumangalam, Roundana, Shenoy Nagar, Aminjikarai, K.M.C, Dasaprakash, Egmore, Pudupet, Triplicane	Sometimes Depart from Avadi
40H	Pattabiram	Anna Square	Kavarapalayam, Avadi, Thirumullaivoyal, Ambathur, Lucas, Anna Nagar West, Thirumangalam, Roundana, Loyola College, Sterling Road, D.P.I, Ethiraj College, L.I.C, Triplicane	Sometimes Depart from Avadi
40J	J.J Nagar West	Anna Square	Vaavin, Collector Nagar, Thirumangalam, Roundana, Loyola College, Sterling Road, D.P.I, Ethiraj College, L.I.C, Triplicane	
40N	J.J Nagar East	Anna Square	Collector Nagar, Thirumangalam, Roundana, Loyola College, Sterling Road, D.P.I, Ethiraj College, L.I.C, Triplicane	
41D	Mandaveli MRTS	Ambathur O.T	Adyar Gate, Alwarpet, D.M.S, Gemini, Sterling Road, Chetpet, Aminjikarai, Shenoy Nagar, Chinthamani, Roundana, Thirumangalam, Anna Nagar West, Padi, Lucas	The bus towards Mandaveli bus terminus is halted until Mandaveli MRTS due to metro rail construction.
42	Broadway	Periyar Nagar	M.G.R Central, Choolai, Aragadam, Pulianthope, Vysarpadi Jeeva, Perambur, Venus	
42B	Broadway	Poompuhar Nagar	M.G.R Central, Choolai, Vepery, Doveton, Otteri, Jamaliya, Perambur, Venus, Kolathur	
42C	Broadway	Teachers Colony	M.G.R Central, Choolai, Aragadam, Pulianthope, Vysarpadi Jeeva, Perambur, Venus, Kolathur, Retteri, Vinayagapuram	
42D	Broadway	Srinivasa Nagar	M.G.R Central, Choolai, Aragadam, Pulianthope, Vysarpadi Jeeva, Perambur, Venus, Kolathur	
42M	Broadway	Madhavaram (M.M.B.T)	M.G.R Central, Choolai, Aragadam, Pulianthope, Vysarpadi Jeeva, Perambur, Venus, Kolathur, Retteri	
44	Broadway	Manali	Beach Station, Thambu Chetty, Vallalar Nagar, Tondiarpet, I.O.C, Sathangadu, M.F.L, Manali Market	
44C	Broadway	Manali	Beach Station, Thamb Chetty, Vallalar Nagar, Ambedkar Nagar, Korukkupet, I.O.C, Sathangadu, M.F.L, Manali Market	
45A	Vivekananda House	Madipakkam	Royapettah, Music Academy, Alwarpet, Adyar Gate, Nandanam, Saidapet, Little Mount, Velachery, Kaiveli, Ponniamman Kovil	
45B	Broadway	Guindy I.E	Secretariat, Anna Square, Triplicane, Ratna Cafe, Vivekananda House, Q.M.C, Luz, Alwarpet, Teynampet, Nandanam, Saidapet, Little Mount	Sometimes Depart from Anna Square
46	M.G.R Koyambedu	Thiru. Vi. Ka Nagar	Arumbakkam, N.S.K Nagar, Roundana, I.C.F, Ayanavaram, Otteri, Jamaliya, Perambur, Venus	
46G	M.G.R Koyambedu	M.K.B Nagar	Arumbakkam, N.S.K Nagar, Roundana, I.C.F, Ayanavaram, Otteri, Pattalam, Kannigapuram, Vyasarpadi Market	
47	Besant Nagar	I.C.F	Adyar, Madhya Kailash, Anna University, Little Mount, Saidapet, Thiyagaraya Nagar, Valluvar Kottam, Pushpa Nagar, Loyola College, Roundana	The bus towards Villivakkam bus terminus is halted until ICF due to metro rail construction.
47A	Thiruvanmiyur	I.C.F	Adyar, Madhya Kailash, Anna University, Little Mount, Saidapet, Thiyagaraya Nagar, Valluvar Kottam, Sterling Road, Chetpet, Kilpauk Garden	
47C	Kotturpuram	Ambathur O.T	Anna University, Little Mount, Saidapet, Thiyagaraya Nagar, Mahalingapuram, Loyola College, Roundana, Thirumangalam, Anna Nagar West, Padi, Lucas	
47D	Thiruvanmiyur	Avadi	Adyar, Madhya Kailash, Anna University, Little Mount, Saidapet, Thiyagaraya Nagar, Valluvar Kottam, Sterling Road, Loyola College, Roundana, Thirumangalam, Anna Nagar West, Padi, Lucas, Ambathur O.T	
48A	Madhavaram	Ambathur I.E	Vathiyar Thottam, Moolakadai, Perambur, Jamaliya, Otteri, Ayanavaram, I.C.F, Padi, Lucas	
48B	Vallalar Nagar	Pudur	Basin Bridge, Pulianthope, Otteri, Ayanavaram, I.C.F, Villivakkam, Padi, Lucas, Ambathur I.E, Ambathur O.T	
48C	Vallalar Nagar	M.G.R Koyambedu	Basin Bridge, Pulianthope, Otteri, Ayanavaram, I.C.F, Villivakkam, Padi, Anna Nagar West, Thirumangalam	
48K	Vallalar Nagar	Kallikuppam	Basin Bridge, Pulianthope, Otteri, Ayanavaram, I.C.F, Villivakkam, Padi, Lucas, Ambathur I.E, Ambathur O.T, Pudur	
48P	Vallalar Nagar	Puthagaram	Basin Bridge, Pulianthope, Otteri, Ayanavaram, I.C.F, Villivakkam, Padi, Lucas, Ambathur I.E, Ambathur O.T, Pudur, Kallikuppam, Surapedu	
49	Thiruvanmiyur	Iyyappanthangal	Adyar, Madhya Kailash, Anna University, Guindy, Kathipara, Nandambakkam, Porur	
49A	Poonamallee	Thiyagaraya Nagar	Kumaran Chavadi, Iyyappanthangal, Porur, Valasaravakkam, Kalaignar Nagar, Nesapakkam, Ashok Pillar, Mambalam	
49F	Foreshore Estate	Poonamallee	Adyar, Madhya Kailash, Anna University, Guindy, Kathipara, Nandambakkam, Porur, Iyyappanthangal, Kumaran Chavadi	The bus towards Mandaveli bus terminus is shifted to Foreshore Estate due to metro rail construction.
49K	Mandaveli MRTS	Porur	Adyar Gate, Kotturpuram, Anna University, Guindy, Kathipara, Nandambakkam	The bus towards Mandaveli bus terminus is shifted to Mandaveli MRTS due to metro rail construction.
50	Thiruverkadu	Broadway	Gurimedai, Perumal Nagar Junction, Velappanchavadi, Maduravoyal, Rohini Theatre, Arumbakkam, Aminjikarai, K.M.C, Dasaprakash, Egmore North, M.G.R Central	
50M	Thiruverkadu	Broadway	Mandhiravedu, Velappanchavadi, Maduravoyal, Rohini Theatre, Arumbakkam, Aminjikarai, K.M.C, Dasaprakash, Egmore North, M.G.R Central	
51	Velachery	Tambaram West	Pallikaranai, Medavakkam, Sembakkam, Selaiyur, Tambaram East	
51A	Thiyagaraya Nagar	Tambaram East	Saidapet, Little Mount, Guindy Race Course, Velachery, Pallikaranai, Medavakkam, Sembakkam, Selaiyur	
51B	Saidapet	Karanai	Little Mount, Velachery, Pallikaranai, Medavakkam, Chithalapakkam, Arasankazhani, Ottiyambakkam	
51D	Broadway	Tambaram West	M.G.R Central, P.OR.R Sons, L.I.C, D.M.S, Teynampet, Nandanam, Saidapet, Little Mount, Velachery, Pallikaranai, Medavakkam, Vengaivasal, Noothanchery, Madambakkam, Balaji Nagar, Selaiyur, Tambaram East	
51F	Thiyagaraya Nagar	Tambaram West	Saidapet, Little Mount, Guindy Race Course, Velachery, Pallikaranai, Medavakkam, Sembakkam, Selaiyur, Tambaram East	
51J	Broadway	Mambakkam Koot Road	M.G.R Central, P.OR.R Sons, L.I.C, D.M.S, Teynampet, Nandanam, Saidapet, Little Mount, Velachery, Pallikaranai, Medavakkam, Chithalapakkam, Ponmar	
51M	Madipakkam	Thiyagaraya Nagar	Vanuvampet, St.Thomas Mount, Maduvankarai, Guindy, Little Mount, Saidapet	
51T	Madurapakkam	Thiyagaraya Nagar	Kovilanchery, Balaji Nagar, Selaiyur, Sembakkam, Medavakkam, Palikaranai, Velachery, Little Mount, Saidapet	
52	Broadway	Pozhichalur	M.G.R Central, P.OR.R Sons, L.I.C, D.M.S, Teynampet, Nandanam, Saidapet, Little Mount, Guindy, Alandur Metro, Arignar Anna International Airport, Pallavaram, Pammal	
52B	Broadway	Hasthinapuram	M.G.R Central, P.OR.R Sons, L.I.C, D.M.S, Teynampet, Nandanam, Saidapet, Little Mount, Guindy, Alandur Metro, Arignar Anna International Airport, Pallavaram, Chromepet, Kumaran Kundram	
52C	Thiyagaraya Nagar	Hasthinapuram	Saidapet, Little Mount, Guindy, Alandur Metro, Arignar Anna International Airport, Pallavaram, Chromepet, Kumaran Kundram	
52G	Broadway	Cowl Bazaar	M.G.R Central, P.OR.R Sons, L.I.C, D.M.S, Teynampet, Nandanam, Saidapet, Little Mount, Guindy, Alandur Metro, Arignar Anna International Airport, Pallavaram, Stephen Church	
52H	Pozhichalur	Hasthinapuram	Pammal, Pallavaram, Chromepet, Kumaran Kundram	
52K	Broadway	Nanganallur	M.G.R Central, P.OR.R Sons, L.I.C, D.M.S, Teynampet, Nandanam, Saidapet, Little Mount, Guindy, N.G.O Colony, St. Thomas Mount, Vanuvampet	
53	Broadway	Poonamallee	M.G.R Central, Egmore North, Dasaprakash, K.M.C, Aminjikarai, Arumbakkam, Rohini Theatre, Maduravoyal, Velappanchavadi, Kumanan Chavadi	Sometimes Cut Service known as 101
53E	Broadway	Kundrathur	M.G.R Central, Egmore North, Dasaprakash, K.M.C, Aminjikarai, Arumbakkam, Rohini Theatre, Maduravoyal, Velappanchavadi, Kumanan Chavadi, Mangadu, Kozhumanivakkam, Kolachery	
53G	Poonamallee	Padurmedu	Varadaraja Puram, Chembarambakkam, Irulapalayam	
53P	Broadway	Pattur	M.G.R Central, Egmore North, Dasaprakash, K.M.C, Aminjikarai, Arumbakkam, Rohini Theatre, Maduravoyal, Velappanchavadi, Kumanan Chavadi, Mangadu	
53S	M.G.R Koyambedu	Pattabiram	Koyambedu Market, Maduravoyal, Velappanchavadi, Thiruverkadu, Mettupalayam, Ayalchery, Anaicutche, Thandarai	
54	Broadway	Poonamallee	M.G.R Central, P.OR.R Sons, L.I.C, D.M.S, Teynampet, Nandanam, Saidapet, Little Mount, Guindy, Kathipara, Nandambakkam, Porur, Iyyappanthangal, Kumanan Chavadi	
54B	Saidapet	Porur	Little Mount, Guindy, Kathipara, Nandambakkam, Manapakkam, Swami Nagar, Gerugambakkam, Moulivakkam	
54C	Pattabiram	Poonamallee	Thandurai, Amudurvedu, Sitharkudu, Vayalanallur, Kolappanchery	
54E	Saidapet	Meppur	Little Mount, Guindy, Kathipara, Nandambakkam, Porur, Iyyappanthangal, Kumanan Chavadi, Poonamallee, Agaram Mel	
54G	Broadway	Kuthambakkam	M.G.R Central, P.OR.R Sons, L.I.C, D.M.S, Teynampet, Nandanam, Saidapet, Little Mount, Guindy, Kathipara, Nandambakkam, Porur, Iyyappanthangal, Kumanan Chavadi, Poonamallee, Varadharaja Puram, Thirumazhisai, Vellavedu	
54K	Saidapet	Nemam	Little Mount, Guindy, Kathipara, Nandambakkam, Porur, Iyyappanthangal, Kumanan Chavadi, Poonamallee, Varadharaja Puram, Thirumazhisai, Vellavedu	
54L	Broadway	Vellavedu	M.G.R Central, P.OR.R Sons, L.I.C, D.M.S, Teynampet, Nandanam, Saidapet, Little Mount, Guindy, Kathipara, Nandambakkam, Porur, Iyyappanthangal, Kumanan Chavadi, Poonamallee, Varadharaja Puram, Thirumazhisai	
54P	Thiyagaraya Nagar	Mangadu	Saidapet, Little Mount, Guindy, Kathipara, Nandambakkam, Porur, Pattur	
54R	Little Mount	Kumanan Chavadi	Guindy, Kathipara, Nandambakkam, Porur, Iyyappanthangal	
54S	Thiyagaraya Nagar	Malayam Pakkam	Saidapet, Little Mount, Guindy, Kathipara, Nandambakkam, Porur, Iyyappanthangal, Kumanan Chavadi, Poonamallee, Agaram Mel	
54V	Thiyagaraya Nagar	Veppampattu R.S	Saidapet, Little Mount, Guindy, Kathipara, Nandambakkam, Porur, Iyyappanthangal, Kumanan Chavadi, Poonamallee, Varadharaja Puram, Thirumazhisai, Vellavedu, Nemam, Perumalpattu	
55A	Pallavaram	Pazhanthandalam	Lakshmipuram, Thiruneermalai, Thirumudivakkam	
55B	Tambaram West	Pazhanthandalam	Kannadapalayam, Kishkindha, Erumaiyur Erikarai, Kanniamman Kovil	
55C	Tambaram	Venkatamangalam / Pungeri	Perungalathur, Sadanandapuram, Nedugundram, Kolapakkam, Rathinamangalam, Kandigai	
55D	Tambaram	Keerapakam	Perungalathur, Sadanandapuram, Nedugundram, Kolapakkam, Rathinamangalam, Kandigai	
55G	Tambaram	Vengambakkam	Perungalathur, Sadanandapuram, Nedugundram, Kolapakkam, Rathinamangalam	
55K	Guduvanchery	Kumizhi	Urapakkam, Maylaima Nagar, Kattur, Arungal, Keerapakkam	
55M	Tambaram	Melakottaiyur - TNPESU	Perungalathur, Vandaloor Zoo, Kilambakkam (K.C.B.T), Kolapakkam, Rathinamangalam, Kandigai, Melakottaiyur	
55V	Tambaram West	Kilambakkam (K.C.B.T)	Tambaram Town Limit, Amudham Nagar, Old Perungalathur, Mudichur, Mannivakkam, Vandaloor Gate, Vandaloor Zoo	
56	Ennore	Vallalar Nagar	Ernavoor, Wimco Nagar, Thiruvottriyur, Theradi, Tollgate, Tondiarpet, Maharani	
56A	Ennore	Vallalar Nagar	V.O.C. Nagar, Thazhankuppam, Ernavoor Kuppam, Wimco Nagar, Thiruvottriyur, Theradi, Tollgate, Tondiarpet, Maharani	
56C	Thiruvottriyur	Broadway	Theradi, Tollgate, Tondiarpet, Kalmandapam, Royapuram, Thambu Chetty, Mannady	
56D	Manali	Broadway	Avurikollaimedu, K.G.L, Tollgate, Kasimedu, Royapuram, Beach Station	
56F	Ernavoor	Broadway	Mullai Nagar, Wimco Nagar, Thiruvottriyur, Theradi, Tollgate, Tondiarpet, Maharani, Vallalar Nagar, Mannady	
56J	Manali New Town	Broadway	Elathanur, M.F.L, Wimco Nagar, Thiruvottriyur, Theradi, Tollgate, Tondiarpet, Royapuram, Beach Station	
56K	Manali	Tollgate,	Avurikollaimedu, K.G.L	
56P	Minjur	Broadway	Nandiambakkam, Vellivoyalchavadi, Manali, M.F.L, Sathangadu, Wimco Nagar, Thiruvottriyur, Theradi, Tollgate, Tondiarpet, Vallalar Nagar, Beach Station	
56T	Athipattu R.S	Broadway	Pattamandiri, Kondakarai, Andarkuppam, Ernavoor, Wimco Nagar, Thiruvottriyur, Theradi, Tollgate, Tondiarpet, Royapuram, Beach Station	
57	Vallalar Nagar	Redhills	Basin Bridge, Vyasarpadi, Moolakadai, Madhavaram (M.M.B.T), Puzhal, Kavankarai	
57A	Vallalar Nagar	Budur Health Care	Basin Bridge, Vyasarpadi, Moolakadai, Madhavaram (M.M.B.T), Puzhal, Kavankarai, Redhills, Padianallur, Vijayanallur, Angadu	
57B	Redhills	Pothur	Bammedukalam, Gandhi Nagar West, Irankuppam	
57C	Vallalar Nagar	Arumandai	Basin Bridge, Vyasarpadi, Moolakadai, Madhavaram (M.M.B.T), Puzhal, Kavankarai, Redhills, Kummanur, Budur	
57D	Broadway	Poochi Athipet	Beach Station, Vallalar Nagar, Basin Bridge, Vyasarpadi, Moolakadai, Madhavaram (M.M.B.T), Puzhal, Kavankarai, Redhills, Rajakalam, Edapalayam, Alamathi, Vanianchathiram	
57E	Redhills	Vichoor	Padianallur, Vijayanallur, Pothur, Maranpedu, Arumandai	
57F	Broadway	Karanodai	Beach Station, Vallalar Nagar, Basin Bridge, Vyasarpadi, Moolakadai, Madhavaram (M.M.B.T), Puzhal, Kavankarai, Redhills, Padianallur, Semilivaram, Sholavaram	
57G	Moolakadai	Vazhuthalambedu	Madhavaram (M.M.B.T), Puzhal, Kavankarai, Redhills, Padianallur, Vijayanallur, Pothur, Maranpedu, Arumandai, Periamullaivoyal	
57H	Broadway	New Erumai Vetti Palayam	Beach Station, Vallalar Nagar, Basin Bridge, Vyasarpadi, Moolakadai, Madhavaram (M.M.B.T), Puzhal, Kavankarai, Redhills, Padianallur, Semilivaram, Sholavaram, Karanodai	
57J	Broadway	Gnayaru	Beach Station, Vallalar Nagar, Basin Bridge, Vyasarpadi, Moolakadai, Madhavaram (M.M.B.T), Puzhal, Kavankarai, Redhills, Padianallur, Semilivaram, Sholavaram, Karanodai, Sothupermudu, Attaipalayam, Kanniyampalayam	
57M	Broadway	Alamathi	Beach Station, Vallalar Nagar, Basin Bridge, Vyasarpadi, Moolakadai, Madhavaram (M.M.B.T), Puzhal, Kavankarai, Redhills, Gandhi Nagar, Rajakalam, Edayapalayam	
57x	Vallalar Nagar	Periyapalayam	Basin Bridge, Vyasarpadi, Moolakadai, Madhavaram (M.M.B.T), Puzhal, Kavankarai, Redhills, Padianallur, Semilivaram, Sholavaram, Karanodai, Janapanchatram, Manjankaranai, Erikarai, Panapakkam	
58V	M.G.R Koyambedu	Redhills	Thirumangalam, Anna Nagar West, Agrakaram, Retteri, Madhavaram (M.M.B.T), Moolakadai, Vathiyar Thottam, Madhavaram, Omakulamedu, Vinayagapuram, Vadakarai	
59	Vallalar Nagar	Thiruverkadu	Basin Bridge, Choolai, Purasaivakkam, Dasaprakash, K.M.C, Aminjikarai, Arumbakkam, Rohini Theatre, Maduravoyal, Velappanchavadi, Perumal Nagar Junction, Gurumedai	
60	Broadway	Anakaputhur	M.G.R Central, P.OR.R Sons, L.I.C, D.M S, Teynampet, Nandanam, Saidapet, Little Mount, Guindy, Alandur Metro, Arignar Anna International Airport, Pallavaram, Pammal	
60A	Broadway	Kundrathur	M.G.R Central, P.OR.R Sons, L.I.C, D.M S, Teynampet, Nandanam, Saidapet, Little Mount, Guindy, Alandur Metro, Arignar Anna International Airport, Pallavaram, Pammal, Anakaputhur, Manacherry	
60D	Broadway	Pammal Kamarajapuram	M.G.R Central, P.OR.R Sons, L.I.C, D.M S, Teynampet, Nandanam, Saidapet, Little Mount, Guindy, Alandur Metro, Arignar Anna International Airport, Pallavaram, Pammal	
60E	Island Grounds	Kundrathur	Parrys Corner, Secretariat, Marina Beach, Q.M.C, Santhome, Foreshore Estate, Adyar, Madhya Kailash, Anna University, Guindy, Alandur Metro, Arignar Anna International Airport, Pallavaram, Pammal, Anakaputhur, Manacherry	
60G	Broadway	Pozhichalur	Secretariat, Marina Beach, Q.M.C, Santhome, Foreshore Estate, Adyar, Madhya Kailash, Anna University, Guindy, Alandur Metro, Arignar Anna International Airport, Pallavaram, Pammal	
60H	Broadway	Shankar Nagar	M.G.R Central, P.OR.R Sons, L.I.C, D.M S, Teynampet, Nandanam, Saidapet, Little Mount, Guindy, Alandur Metro, Arignar Anna International Airport, Pallavaram, Pammal	
61A	Avadi	Melappedu	Kovilpadagai Road Junction, Kalaignar Nagar, Thangaya Gate, Brindavan Nagar, Mittanamalli	
61C	Avadi	Ellaiamman Nagar	Kovilpadagai Road Junction, Kalaignar Nagar, Thangaya Gate, Brindavan Nagar, Mittanamalli, Ellaiamman Kovil	
61E	Avadi	Kilkondaiyur	Kovilpadagai Road Junction, Moorai Anna Nagar, Veerapuram, Pandeshwaram	
61K	Avadi	Kannaiamman Nagar	Kovilpadagai Road Junction, Moorai Anna Nagar, Veerapuram, T.S.P Camp	
61R	Avadi	Redhills	Kovilpadagai, Kandapalayam, Kollumedu, Arikamedu, Sidco, Irankuppam, Bammedukulam, Gandhi Nagar, Alamaram	
62	Poonamallee	Redhills	Karayanchavadi, Kaaduveti, Govaradhanagiri, Avadi, Thirumullaivoyal, Raaki Theatre, Pudhur, Kallikupam, Surapet, Puzhal, Kavangarai	
62A	Ambathur I.E	Redhills	Ambathur O.T, Raaki Theatre, Pudhur, Kallikupam, Surapet, Puzhal, Kavangarai	
62B	J.J Nagar West	Redhills	Ambathur, Raaki Theatre, Thirumullaivoyal, Pothur, Irankuppam, Bammedukulam	
62M	Poonamallee	Madhavaram (M.M.B.T)	Karayanchavadi, Kaaduveti, Govaradhanagiri, Avadi, Thirumullaivoyal, Raaki Theatre, Pudhur, Kallikupam, Surapet, Puzhal	
63	I.C.F	Thiruverkadu	Sidco Nagar, Lucas, Ambathur I.E, Ayyappa Nagar, Konimedu Road Junction	
64C	Broadway	Manali	M.G.R Central, Periyamedu, Vepery, Doveton, Pattalam, Kannigapuram, Erukkancherry, Moolakadai, Madhavaram Milk Colony, Mathur	
64D	Broadway	Kosappur	M.G.R Central, Periyamedu, Vepery, Doveton, Pattalam, Kannigapuram, Erukkancherry, Moolakadai, Madhavaram Milk Colony, Mathur	
64K	Broadway	Kaviarasu Kannadasan Nagar	M.G.R Central, Periyamedu, Vepery, Doveton, Pattalam, Kannigapuram, Perambur Market, Moolakadai, Erukkancherry, Sidco	
64M	M.G.R Central	Madhavaram (M.M.B.T)	Vepery, Doveton, Pattalam, Binny Mill, Jamaliya, Perambur, Moolakkadai	
65A	Saidapet	Muthapudupet	Little Mount, Guindy, Kathipara, Nandambakkam, Porur, Iyyappanthangal, Karayaanchavadi, Kaaduveti, Govaradhanagiri, Avadi, Kovilpadagai Road Junction, Thangaya Gate	
65B	Poonamallee	Ambathur I.E	Parivakkam, Kaaduveti, Govaradhanagiri, Avadi, Kovilpadagai Road Junction, Thirumullaivoyal, Raaki Theatre, Ambathur O.T	
65D	Avadi	Melakondaiyur	Kavarapalayam, Pattabiram, Annaikattuchery, Nemilichery, Thiruninravur, Melappedu, Pakkam, Puliur Kadaigai, Puliyur	
65E	Poonamallee	Avadi	Parivakkam, Kaaduveti, Govaradhanagiri	
65G	Avadi	Meyyur	Kavarapalayam, Pattabiram, Annaikattuchery, Nemilichery, Thiruninravur, Melappedu, Pakkam, Kavanur, Thamaraipakkam, Vilappakkam, Eraiyur	
65H	Avadi	Redhills	Kavarapalayam, Pattabiram, Annaikattuchery, Nemilichery, Thiruninravur, Melappedu, Pakkam, Kavanur, Thamaraipakkam, Anaikattur, Poochi Athipet, Alamathi, Gandhi Nagar West	
65K	Poonamallee	Avadi	Karayanchavadi, Kaaduveti, Govaradhanagiri	
66	Tambaram	Poonamallee	Chromepet, Pallavaram, Pammal, Anakaputhur, Manacherry, Kundrathur, Chikkarayapuram, Mangadu, Kumanan Chavadi	
66A	Hasthinapuram	Kundrathur	Chromepet, Pallavaram, Pammal, Anakaputhur, Manacherry	
66J	Tambaram	Poonamallee	Chromepet, Pallavaram, Pammal, Anakaputhur, Manacherry, Kundrathur, Chikkarayapuram, Mangadu, Kumanan Chavadi	
66K	Kilambakkam (K.C.B.T)	Kundrathur	Vandaloor Zoo, Perungalathur, Tambaram, Chromepet, Pallavaram, Pammal, Anakaputhur, Manacherry	
66P	Kilambakkam (K.C.B.T)	Poonamallee	Vandaloor Zoo, Perungalathur, Tambaram, Chromepet, Pallavaram, Pammal, Anakaputhur, Manacherry, Kundrathur, Chikkarayapuram, Mangadu, Kumanan Chavadi	
66Px	Guduvanchery	Poonamallee	Kilambakkam (K.C.B.T), Vandaloor Zoo, Perungalathur, Tambaram, Chromepet, Pallavaram, Pammal, Anakaputhur, Manacherry, Kundrathur, Chikkarayapuram, Mangadu, Kumanan Chavadi	
70	Avadi	Tambaram	Thirumullaivoyal, Ambathur, Lucas, Anna Nagar West, Thirumangalam, M.G.R Koyambedu, Arumbakkam Metro, Vadapalani, Ashok Pillar, Ekkattuthangal, Alandur Metro, Arignar Anna International Airport, Pallavaram, Chromepet	
70A	Avadi	M.G.R Koyambedu	Thirumullaivoyal, Ambathur, Lucas, Anna Nagar West, Thirumangalam	
70C	Koyambedu Market	Kilambakkam (K.C.B.T)	Chinmaya Nagar, Virugambakkam, K.K Nagar West, Ashok Pillar, Ekkattuthangal, Alandur Metro, Arignar Anna International Airport, Pallavaram, Chromepet, Tambaram, Perungalathur, Vandalur Zoo	
70G	Vadapalani	Guduvanchery	Kalaignar Nagar, Ashok Pillar, Ekkattuthangal, Alandur Metro, Arignar Anna International Airport, Pallavaram, Chromepet, Tambaram, Perungalathur, Vandaloor Zoo, Kilambakkam (K.C.B.T)	
70H	M.G.R Koyambedu	Hasthinapuram	Arumbakkam Metro, Vadapalani, Ashok Pillar, Ekkattuthangal, Alandur Metro, Arignar Anna International Airport, Pallavaram, Chromepet	
70J	J.J Nagar West	Tambaram	J.J Nagar East, Collector Nagar, Thirumangalam, M.G.R Koyambedu, Arumbakkam Metro, Vadapalani, Ashok Pillar, Ekkattuthangal, Alandur Metro, Arignar Anna International Airport, Pallavaram, Chromepet	
70K	Avadi	Kilambakkam (K.C.B.T)	Thirumullaivoyal, Ambathur, Lucas, Anna Nagar West, Thirumangalam, M.G.R Koyambedu, Arumbakkam Metro, Vadapalani, Ashok Pillar, Ekkattuthangal, Alandur Metro, Arignar Anna International Airport, Pallavaram, Chromepet, Tambaram, Perungalathur, Vandaloor Zoo	
70M	Madhavaram (M.M.B.T)	Kilambakkam (K.C.B.T)	Retteri, Anna Nagar West, Thirumangalam, M.G.R Koyambedu, Arumbakkam Metro, Vadapalani, Ashok Pillar, Ekkattuthangal, Alandur Metro, Arignar Anna International Airport, Pallavaram, Chromepet, Tambaram, Perungalathur, Vandalur Zoo	
70N	M.G.R Koyambedu	Nanganallur	Arumbakkam Metro, Vadapalani, Ashok Pillar, Ekkattuthangal, Alandur Metro, Vanuvampet	
70V	M.G.R Koyambedu	Kilambakkam (K.C.B.T)	Arumbakkam Metro, Vadapalani, Ashok Pillar, Ekkattuthangal, Alandur Metro, Arignar Anna International Airport, Pallavaram, Chromepet, Tambaram, Perungalathur, Vandaloor Zoo	
71D	Broadway	Pudur	M.G.R Central, Egmore North, Dasaprakash, K.M.C, Kilpauk Garden, V.O.C. Nagar, Sidco Nagar, Lucas, Ambathur, Oragadam (Ambattur)	
71E	Broadway	Pattabiram	M.G.R Central, Egmore North, Dasaprakash, K.M.C, Kilpauk Garden, V.O.C. Nagar, Sidco Nagar, Lucas, Ambathur, Thirumullaivoyal, Avadi, Kavarapalayam	
71H	Broadway	Kamaraj Nagar	M.G.R Central, Egmore North, Dasaprakash, K.M.C, Kilpauk Garden, V.O.C. Nagar, Sidco Nagar, Lucas, Ambathur, Thirumullaivoyal, Avadi	
71V	Broadway	Veppampattur Eswaran Nagar	M.G.R Central, Egmore North, Dasaprakash, K.M.C, Kilpauk Garden, V.O.C. Nagar, Sidco Nagar, Lucas, Ambathur, Thirumullaivoyal, Avadi, Kavarapalayam, Annaikattuchery, Nemilichery, Thiruninravur	
72	Thiyagaraya Nagar	Thiruverkadu	Bharathi Nagar, Liberty, Vadapalani, Arumbakkam Metro, M.G.R Koyambedu, Maduravoyal, Velappanchavadi, Perumal Nagar Junction, Gurumedai	
72M	Thiyagaraya Nagar	Thiruverkadu	Bharathi Nagar, Liberty, Vadapalani, Arumbakkam Metro, M.G.R Koyambedu, Maduravoyal, Velappanchavadi, Mandhiravedu	
73	M.G.R Koyambedu	Avadi	Maduravoyal, Vanagaram, Athipet, Athipet I.C.F Colony, Ambathur O.T, Thirumullaivoyal	
73A	M.G.R Koyambedu	Avadi	Maduravoyal, Vanagaram, Athipet, Athipet I.C.F Colony, Annanur, Murugappa Polytechnic	
73C	Ayampakkam	Ambathur I.E	Dunlop	
76	M.G.R Koyambedu	Medavakkam Koot Road	Arumbakkam Metro, Vadapalani, Ashok Pillar, Ekkattuthangal, Alandur Metro, Vanuvampet, Kilkattalai, Kovilambakkam, Vellaikal	
76B	M.G.R Koyambedu	Ottiyambakkam	Arumbakkam Metro, Vadapalani, Ashok Pillar, Ekkattuthangal, Alandur Metro, Vanuvampet, Kilkattalai, Kovilambakkam, Vellaikal, Medavakkam, Chithalakappam	
76V	M.G.R Koyambedu	Siruchery I.T Park	Arumbakkam Metro, Vadapalani, Ashok Pillar, Ekkattuthangal, Alandur Metro, Vanuvampet, Puzhuthivakkam, Velachery M.R.T.S, Kamatchi Hospital, Thoraipakkam, Sholinganallur, Navalur	
77	Avadi	M.G.R Koyambedu	Thirumullaivoyal, Ambathur O.T, Ambathur I.E, Vaavin, Collector Nagar, Thirumangalam	
77A	Ayampakkam TNHB	M.G.R Koyambedu	Dunlop, Ambathur I.E, Vaavin, Collector Nagar, Thirumangalam	
77B	Oragadam (Ambattur)	M.G.R Koyambedu	Ambathur I.E, Vaavin, Collector Nagar, Thirumangalam	
77E	Kannaiamman Nagar	M.G.R Koyambedu	Veerapuram, T.S.P Camp, Moorai Anna Nagar, Kovilpadagai Road Junction, Avadi, Thirumullaivoyal, Ambathur O.T, Ambathur I.E, Vaavin, Collector Nagar, Thirumangalam	
77K	Karukku	M.G.R Koyambedu	Menambedu, Alamaram, Ambathur O.T, Ambathur I.E, Vaavin, Collector Nagar, Thirumangalam	
77M	Madanakuppam	M.G.R Koyambedu	Kalikuppam, Pudur, Oragadam (Ambattur), Ambathur O.T, Ambathur I.E, Vaavin, Collector Nagar, Thirumangalam	
77P	Poochi Athipet	Koyambedu Market	Veerapuram Road Junction, Kovilpadagai Road Junction, Avadi, Thirumullaivoyal, Ambathur O.T, Ambathur I.E, Vaavin, Collector Nagar, Thirumangalam	
77T	Thirumullaivoyal Colony	M.G.R Koyambedu	Devik Eswari Nagar, Ambathur O.T, Ambathur I.E, Vaavin, Collector Nagar, Thirumangalam	
77V	Veppampattu Eswaran Nagar	M.G.R Koyambedu	Thiruninravur, Nemilichery, Amudurmedu, Pattabiram, Kavarapalayam, Avadi, Thirumullaivoyal, Ambathur O.T, Ambathur I.E, Vaavin, Collector Nagar, Thirumangalam	
78	Thiruvanmiyur	M.G.R Koyambedu	Adyar, Madhya Kailash, Anna University, Guindy, Ekkattuthangal, Ashok Pillar, Vadapalani, Arumbakkam Metro	
79A	Tambaram West	Navalur S.C.B	Tambaram Town Limit, Old Perungalathur, Mudichur, Mannivakkam, Padappai, Nariyambakkam	
79V	Tambaram Sanatorium	Vembakkam	Tambaram, Perungalathur, Vandaloor Zoo, Kilambakkam (K.C.B.T), Guduvanchery, Potheri, Kattankulathur, Singaperumal Kovil	
88C	Broadway	Thandalam Village	M.G.R Central, P.OR.R Sons, L.I.C, D.M.S, Teynampet, Nandanam, Saidapet, Little Mount, Guindy, Kathipara, Nandambakkam, Porur, Moulivakkam, Gerugambakkam	
88D	West Saidapet	Kundrathur	Mettupalayam, Saidapet, Little Mount, Guindy, Kathipara, Nandambakkam, Porur, Moulivakkam, Gerugambakkam, Kovur, Kolachery	
88K	Broadway	Kundrathur	M.G.R Central, P.OR.R Sons, L.I.C, D.M.S, Teynampet, Nandanam, Saidapet, Little Mount, Guindy, Kathipara, Nandambakkam, Porur, Moulivakkam, Gerugambakkam, Kovur, Kolachery	
88L	Vadapalani	Periya Colony	Virugambakkam, Valasaravakkam, Porur, Moulivakkam, Gerugambakkam, Kovur, Kolachery, Kundrathur, Nandambakkam	
88M	Vadapalani	Somangalam	Virugambakkam, Valasaravakkam, Porur, Moulivakkam, Gerugambakkam, Kovur, Kolachery, Kundrathur, Nandambakkam, Nallur	
88R	Saidapet	Amarambedu	Little Mount, Guindy, Kathipara, Nandambakkam, Porur, Moulivakkam, Gerugambakkam, Kovur, Kolachery, Kundrathur, Nandambakkam, Nallur	
89T	Kundrathur	Tambaram West	Nandambakkam, Nallur, Somangalam, Anjugam Nagar, Kannadapalayam, Tambaram R.T.O	
91	Kilambakkam (K.C.B.T)	Thiruvanmiyur	Vandaloor Zoo, Perungalathur, Tambaram, Chromepet, Vels University, Eachangadu, Kamatchi Hospital, Seevaram, Perungudi, Kandanchavadi	Sometimes operates to Tambaram
91A	Hasthinapuram	Thiruvanmiyur	Chromepet, Vels University, Eachangadu, Kamatchi Hospital, Seevaram, Perungudi, Kandanchavadi	
91R	Kilambakkam (K.C.B.T)	Velachery	Vandaloor Zoo, Perungalathur, Tambaram, Chromepet, Vels University, Eachangadu, Kilkattalai, Madipakkam, Kaiveli	
91V	Guduvanchery	Thiruvanmiyur	Kilambakkam (K.C.B.T), Vandaloor Zoo, Perungalathur, Tambaram, Chromepet, Vels University, Eachangadu, Kamatchi Hospital, Seevaram, Perungudi, Kandanchavadi	
95	Thiruvanmiyur	Tambaram East	Kandanchavadi, Perungudi, Okkiyampet, Sholinganallur, Medavakkam, Sembakkam, Selaiyur	
95G	Okkiyam Thoraipakkam Sec. Colony	Guduvanchery	Okkiyampet, Sholinganallur, Medavakkam, Sembakkam, Selaiyur, Tambaram East, Perungalathur, Vandaloor Zoo	
95W	Thiruvanmiyur	Tambaram West	Kandanchavadi, Perungudi, Okkiyampet, Sholinganallur, Medavakkam, Sembakkam, Selaiyur, Tambaram East	
99	Adyar	Tambaram West	Thiruvanmiyur, Palavakkam, Neelankarai, Injambakkam, Akkarai, Sholinganallur, Medavakkam, Sembakkam, Selaiyur, Tambaram East	
99A	Sholinganallur	Tambaram West	Medavakkam, Sembakkam, Selaiyur, Tambaram East	
99C	Chemmanchery S.C.B	Tambaram West	Perumbakkam, Medavakkam, Sembakkam, Selaiyur, Tambaram East	
101	Thiruvottriyur	Poonamallee	Theradi, Tollgate, Kasimedu, Royapuram, Beach Station, Broadway, M.G.R Central, Egmore North, Dasaprakash, K.M.C, Aminjikarai, Arumbakkam, Rohini Theatre, Maduravoyal, Velappanchavadi, Kumanan Chavadi	
102	Island Grounds	Kelambakkam	Parrys Corner, Secretariat, Marina Beach, Q.M.C, Santhome, Foreshore Estate, Adyar, Kandanchavadi, Perungudi, Sholinganallur, Chemmenchery, Navalur, Siruchery, Padur	Sometime till Siruchery I.T Park. Extended to Island Grounds due to Broadway Station renovations
102A	Thiruvanmiyur	Pudupakkam	Kandanchavadi, Perungudi, Sholinganallur, Chemmenchery, Navalur, Siruchery I.T Park	
102C	Island Grounds	Chemmanchery S.C.B	Parrys Corner,Secretariat, Marina Beach, Q.M.C, Santhome, Foreshore Estate, Adyar, Kandanchavadi, Perungudi, Sholinganallur, Nucleus Company	Extended to Island Grounds due to Broadway Station renovations
102K	Island Grounds	Kannagi Nagar S.C.B / Ezhil Nagar	Parrys Corner, Secretariat, Marina Beach, Q.M.C, Santhome, Foreshore Estate, Adyar, Kandanchavadi, Perungudi, Mettukuppam	Extended to Island Grounds due to Broadway Station renovations
102M	Adyar	Manamathi	S.R.P Tools, Kandanchavadi, Perungudi, Sholinganallur, Chemmenchery, Navalur, Siruchery, Padur, Kelambakkam, Thiruporur, Chiruthavoor	
102P	Island Grounds	Perumbakkam S.C.B	Parrys Corner,Secretariat, Marina Beach, Q.M.C, Santhome, Foreshore Estate, Adyar, Kandanchavadi, Perungudi, Sholinganallur, Chemmenchery	Extended to Island Grounds due to Broadway Station renovations
102S	Island Grounds	Okkiyam Thoraipakkam Sec. Colony	Parrys Corner, Secretariat, Marina Beach, Q.M.C, Santhome, Foreshore Estate, Adyar, Kandanchavadi, Perungudi	Extended to Island Grounds due to Broadway Station renovations
104	Tambaram	Redhills	Porur Toll Plaza, Ambathur I.E, Ambathur O.T, Oragadam (Ambattur), Kallikuppam, Surapet, Puzhal, Kavankarai	
104A	Kilambakkam (K.C.B.T)	Avadi	Vandaloor Zoo, Perungalathur, Porur Toll Plaza, Ambathur I.E, Ambathur O.T, Thirumulaivoyal	
104C	Guduvanchery	M.G.R Koyambedu	Kilambakkam (K.C.B.T), Vandaloor Zoo, Perungalathur, Porur Toll Plaza, Maduravoyal, Rohini Theatre	
104F	Kilambakkam (K.C.B.T)	Madhavaram	Vandaloor Zoo, Perungalathur, Porur Toll Plaza, Ambathur I.E, Lucas, Retteri, Madhavaram (M.M.B.T), Moolakadai	
104G	Kilambakkam (K.C.B.T)	M.K.B Nagar	Vandaloor Zoo, Perungalathur, Porur Toll Plaza, Ambathur I.E, Lucas, Sidco Nagar, I.C.F, Ayanavaram, Otteri, Pulianthope, Kannigapuram, Vyasarpadi Market	
104H	Kilambakkam (K.C.B.T)	Kaviarasu Kannadasan Nagar	Vandaloor Zoo, Perungalathur, Porur Toll Plaza, Ambathur I.E, Lucas, Retteri, Madhavaram (M.M.B.T), Moolakadai, Erukanchery	
104K	Kilambakkam (K.C.B.T)	Redhills	Vandaloor Zoo, Perungalathur, Porur Toll Plaza, Ambathur I.E, Ambathur O.T, Oragadam (Ambattur), Kallikuppam, Surapet, Puzhal, Kavankarai	
104M	Kilambakkam (K.C.B.T)	Madhavaram (M.M.B.T)	Vandaloor Zoo, Perungalathur, Porur Toll Plaza, Ambathur I.E, Lucas, Retteri	
104P	Kilambakkam (K.C.B.T)	Perambur	Vandaloor Zoo, Perungalathur, Porur Toll Plaza, Ambathur I.E, Lucas, Retteri, Kolathur, Venus	
104T	Kilambakkam (K.C.B.T)	Thiru. Vi. Ka Nagar	Vandaloor Zoo, Perungalathur, Porur Toll Plaza, Ambathur I.E, Vaavin, Collector Nagar, Thirumangalam, Anna Nagar West, Lucas, Retteri, Kolathur	
105	Tambaram West	Siruchery I.T Park	Tambaram East, Selaiyur, Sembakkam, Medavakkam, Chithalapakkam, Arasankazhani, Ottiyambakkam, Karanai, Thalambur, Navalur	
105A	Tambaram West	Siruchery I.T Park	Tambaram East, Selaiyur, Balaji Nagar, Noothanceri, Chithalapakkam, Arasankazhani, Ottiyambakkam, Karanai, Thalambur, Navalur	
109	Island Grounds	Kovalam	Parrys Corner, Secretariat, Marina Beach, Q.M.C, Santhome, Foreshore Estate, Adyar, Thiruvanmiyur, Palavakkam, Neelankarai, Injambakkam, Kanathur, Muttukadu	Extended to Island Grounds due to Broadway Station renovations
109A	Island Grounds	Thiruvidanthai	Parrys Corner, Secretariat, Marina Beach, Q.M.C, Santhome, Foreshore Estate, Adyar, Thiruvanmiyur, Palavakkam, Neelankarai, Injambakkam, Kanathur, Muttukadu, Kovalam	Extended to Island Grounds due to Broadway Station renovations
109T	Thiruvottriyur	Kovalam	Theradi, Tollgate, Kasimedu, Beach Station, Secretariat, Marina Beach, Q.M.C, Nochikuppam, Foreshore Estate, Besant Nagar, Indira Nagar, Thiruvanmiyur, Palavakkam, Neelankarai, Injambakkam, Kanathur, Muttukadu	
111	Tambaram	Thiruverkadu	Chromepet, Pallavaram, Arignar Anna International Airport, Alandur Metro, Ekkattuthangal, Ashok Pillar, Vadapalani, Arumbakkam Metro, M.G.R Koyambedu, Maduravoyal, Velappanchavadi, Perumal Nagar Junction, Gurumedai	
113	Guindy I.E	Redhills	Ashok Pillar, Vadapalani, Arumbakkam Metro, M.G.R Koyambedu, Thirumangalam, Anna Nagar West, Agrakaram, Retteri, Vinayagapuram, Puzhal, Kavankarai	
114	M.G.R Koyambedu	Redhills	Thirumangalam, Anna Nagar West, Agrakaram, Retteri, Madhavaram (M.M.B.T), Puzhal, Kavankarai	
114A	Ayanavaram	Redhills	I.C.F, Villivakkam, Srinivasa Nagar, Retteri, Madhavaram (M.M.B.T), Puzhal, Kavankarai	
114C	M.G.R Koyambedu	Thamarapakkam Koot Road	Thirumangalam, Anna Nagar West, Agrakaram, Retteri, Madhavaram (M.M.B.T), Puzhal, Kavankarai, Redhills, Gandhi Nagar West, Alamathi, Koduvalli	
114D	M.G.R Koyambedu	Arani	Thirumangalam, Anna Nagar West, Agrakaram, Retteri, Madhavaram (M.M.B.T), Puzhal, Kavankarai, Redhills, Padianallur, Semilivaram, Sholavaram, Karanodai, Janapanchatram, Peruvallur, Chinnambedu, Agaram	
114E	M.G.R Koyambedu	New Erumai Vetti Palayam	Thirumangalam, Anna Nagar West, Agrakaram, Retteri, Madhavaram (M.M.B.T), Puzhal, Kavankarai, Redhills, Padianallur, Semilivaram, Sholavaram, Karanodai	
114G	M.G.R Koyambedu	Gnayaru	Thirumangalam, Anna Nagar West, Agrakaram, Retteri, Madhavaram (M.M.B.T), Puzhal, Kavankarai, Redhills, Padianallur, Semilivaram, Sholavaram, Budur, Arumandai	
114P	M.G.R Koyambedu	Padianallur	Thirumangalam, Anna Nagar West, Agrakaram, Retteri, Madhavaram (M.M.B.T), Puzhal, Kavankarai, Redhills	
114S	Koyambedu Market	Seemapuram	Thirumangalam, Anna Nagar West, Agrakaram, Retteri, Madhavaram (M.M.B.T), Puzhal, Kavankarai, Redhills, Padianallur, Semilivaram, Sholavaram, Karanodai, Nerkundram, Madiyur	
118	Tambaram	Maraimalai Nagar	Perungalathur, Vandaloor Zoo, Kilambakkam (K.C.B.T), Guduvanchery, Potheri, Kattankulathur	
118G	Tambaram	Kavanoor	Perungalathur, Vandaloor Zoo, Kilambakkam (K.C.B.T), Guduvanchery, Madambakkam, Kuthanur, Thiruthavali	
118N	Tambaram	Neelamangalam	Perungalathur, Vandaloor Zoo, Urapakkam, Adhanur, Madambakkam, Kuthanur	
118P	Tambaram	Parameshwari Nagar	Perungalathur, Vandaloor Zoo, Kilambakkam (K.C.B.T), Guduvanchery, Nandhavaram	
118T	Tambaram	Darkash	Perungalathur, Vandaloor Zoo, Kilambakkam (K.C.B.T), Guduvanchery, Nandhavaram, Perumanttunallur	
119	Guindy I.E	Chemmanchery S.C.B	Checkpost, Velachery, Tharamani, S.R.P Tools, Kandanchavadi, Perungudi, Sholinganallur, Nucleus Company	
119G	Guindy I.E	Perumbakkam S.C.B	Checkpost, Velachery, Tharamani, S.R.P Tools, Kandanchavadi, Perungudi, Sholinganallur, Nucleus Company	
120	Broadway	Avadi	M.G.R Central, Egmore North, Dasaprakash, Purasaivakkam, Kellys, Ayanavaram, I.C.F, Lucas, Ambathur, Thirumullaivoyal	
120A	Broadway	Arakkambakkam	M.G.R Central, Egmore North, Dasaprakash, Purasaivakkam, Kellys, Ayanavaram, I.C.F, Lucas, Ambathur, Thirumullaivoyal, Avadi, Kovilpathagai, Kannadapalayam, Moorai, Veerapuram	
120E	Broadway	Kilkondaiyur	M.G.R Central, Egmore North, Dasaprakash, Purasaivakkam, Kellys, Ayanavaram, I.C.F, Lucas, Ambathur, Thirumullaivoyal, Avadi, Kovilpathagai, Kannadapalayam, Veerapuram, Pandeswaram	
120F	Broadway	Oragadam (Ambattur)	M.G.R Central, Egmore North, Dasaprakash, Purasaivakkam, Kellys, Ayanavaram, I.C.F, Lucas, Ambathur I.E, Ambathur O.T	
120G	Broadway	Menambedu	M.G.R Central, Egmore North, Dasaprakash, Purasaivakkam, Kellys, Ayanavaram, I.C.F, Lucas, Ambathur I.E, Ambathur O.T, Alamaram	
120K	Broadway	Kadhavoor	M.G.R Central, Egmore North, Dasaprakash, Purasaivakkam, Kellys, Ayanavaram, I.C.F, Lucas, Ambathur, Thirumullaivoyal, Avadi, Kovilpathagai, Kannadapalayam, Veerapuram, Arakkambakkam	
121	M.G.R Koyambedu	Minjur	Thirumangalam, Anna Nagar West, Retteri, Madhavaram (M.M.B.T), Manjampakkam, Manali, M.F.L, Elanthur, Manali New Town, Kondakkarai, Nandiyambakkam	
121A	M.G.R Koyambedu	Manali	Thirumangalam, Anna Nagar West, Retteri, Madhavaram (M.M.B.T), Moolakadai, Madhavaram Milk Colony, Mathur	
121C	M.G.R Koyambedu	Ennore	Thirumangalam, Anna Nagar West, Retteri, Madhavaram (M.M.B.T), Moolakadai, Madhavaram Milk Colony, Mathur, Manali Market, M.F.L, Sathangadu, Ernavoor	
121D	M.G.R Koyambedu	Manali New Town	Thirumangalam, Anna Nagar West, Retteri, Madhavaram (M.M.B.T), Moolakadai, Madhavaram Milk Colony, Mathur, Manali Market, M.F.L, Elanthur	
121G	M.G.R Koyambedu	Kaviarasu Kannadasan Nagar	Thirumangalam, Anna Nagar West, Retteri, Madhavaram (M.M.B.T), Moolakadai, Erukkanchery	
121M	M.G.R Koyambedu	Madhavaram	Thirumangalam, Anna Nagar West, Retteri, Madhavaram (M.M.B.T), Moolakadai	
129C	Perambur	Nanganallur	Jamaliya, Otteri, Purasaivakkam, K.M.C, Chetpet, Sterling Road, Valluvar Kottam, Thiyagaraya Nagar, Saidapet, Little Mount, Guindy, Alandur Metro, Pazhavanthangal	
142	Perambur	Vinayagapuram	Venus, Kolathur, Retteri	
142B	Broadway	Peruvallur Kumaran Nagar	M.G.R Central, Choolai, Vepery, Pattalam, Otteri, Jamaliya, Perambur, Venus, Kolathur	
142P	Perambur	Puthagaram	Venus, Kolathur, Retteri, Vinayagapuram	
147A	Thiyagaraya Nagar	J.J Nagar East	Valluvar Kottam, Pushpa Nagar, Loyola College, Roundana, Thirumangalam, Collector Nagar	
147B	Thiyagaraya Nagar	J.J Nagar West	Valluvar Kottam, Pushpa Nagar, Loyola College, Roundana, Thirumangalam, Collector Nagar, Vaavin	
147C	Thiyagaraya Nagar	Ambathur O.T	Valluvar Kottam, Pushpa Nagar, Loyola College, Roundana, Thirumangalam, Collector Nagar, Vaavin, Ambathur I.E	
147V	Thiyagaraya Nagar	Venkatachalam Nagar	Valluvar Kottam, Pushpa Nagar, Loyola College, Roundana, Thirumangalam, Collector Nagar, Vaavin, Ambathur I.E, Ambathur O.T, Thirumullaivoyal	
150	Avadi	Broadway	Paruth I.E, Thiruvekadu, Gurimedai, Perumal Nagar Junction, Velappanchavadi, Maduravoyal, Rohini Theatre, Arumbakkam, Aminjikarai, K.M.C, Dasaprakash, Egmore North, M.G.R Central	
153	M.G.R Koyambedu	Poonamallee	Rohini Theatre, Maduravoyal, Velappanchavadi, Kumanan Chavadi	
153A	M.G.R Koyambedu	Thiruvallur	Rohini Theatre, Maduravoyal, Velappanchavadi, Kumanan Chavadi, Poonamallee, Nazarathpet, Thirumazhisai, Vellavedu, Neemam, Pudhuchatram, Mettukandigai, Aranvoyal, Manavalan Nagar	
153P	M.G.R Koyambedu	Parambakkam	Rohini Theatre, Maduravoyal, Velappanchavadi, Kumanan Chavadi, Poonamallee, Nazarathpet, Thirumazhisai, Chembarambakkam, Thandalam, Mannur, Ulandhai, Mappedu, Kodenchery, Covam	
153T	M.G.R Koyambedu	Thiruvallur	Rohini Theatre, Maduravoyal, Velappanchavadi, Kumanan Chavadi, Poonamallee, Nazarathpet, Thirumazhisai, Chembarambakkam, Thandalam, Mannur, Koppur, Aranvoyal, Manavalan Nagar	
154	Thiyagaraya Nagar	Poonamallee	Saidapet, Little Mount, Guindy, Kathipara, Nandambakkam, Porur, Iyyappanthangal, Kumanan Chavadi	
154B	Nanganallur	Poonamallee	Vanuvampet, Alandur Metro, Kathipara, Nandambakkam, Porur, Iyyappanthangal, Kumanan Chavadi	
154E	Ekkattuthangal	Vellavedu	Kathipara, Nandambakkam, Porur, Iyyappanthangal, Kumanan Chavadi, Poonamallee, Nazarathpet, Thirumazhisai, Meenambedu	
154P	Thiyagaraya Nagar	Pattur	Saidapet, Little Mount, Guindy, Kathipara, Nandambakkam, Porur, Iyyappanthangal, Kumanan Chavadi, Mangadu	
155A	Broadway	Pazhathandalam	M.G.R Central, P.OR.R Sons, L.I.C, D.M S, Teynampet, Nandanam, Saidapet, Little Mount, Guindy, Alandur Metro, Arignar Anna International Airport, Pallavaram, Lakshmipuram, Thiruneermalai, Thirumudivakkam	
157	Thiruvottriyur	Redhills	Theradi, Tollgate, Tondiarpet Power House, M.K.B Nagar, Erukkanchery, Moolakadai, Madhavaram (M.M.B.T), Puzhal	
157E	Ennore	Redhills	V.O.C. Nagar, Thalankuppam, Ernavoor Kuppam, Wimco Nagar, Thiruvottriyur, Theradi, Tollgate, Tondiarpet Power House, M.K.B Nagar, Erukkanchery, Moolakadai, Madhavaram (M.M.B.T), Puzhal	
159	Thiruvottriyur	Thiruverkadu	Theradi, Tollgate, Tondiarpet, Vallalar Nagar, Basin Bridge, Choolai, Purasaivakkam, K.M.C, Aminjikarai, Arumbakkam, Rohini Theatre, Maduravoyal, Velappanchavadi, Perumal Nagar Junction, Gurimedai	
159A	Thiruvottriyur	M.G.R Koyambedu	Theradi, Tollgate, Tondiarpet, Vallalar Nagar, Basin Bridge, Choolai, Purasaivakkam, K.M.C, Aminjikarai, Arumbakkam	
159B	Tollgate,	M.G.R Koyambedu	Tondiarpet, Vallalar Nagar, Basin Bridge, Choolai, Purasaivakkam, K.M.C, Aminjikarai, Arumbakkam	
159E	Ennore	M.G.R Koyambedu	Ernavoor, Wimco Nagar, Thiruvottriyur, Theradi, Tollgate, Tondiarpet, Vallalar Nagar, Basin Bridge, Choolai, Purasaivakkam, K.M.C, Aminjikarai, Arumbakkam	
159K	Kargil Nagar	M.G.R Koyambedu	Wimco Nagar, Thiruvottriyur, Theradi, Tollgate, Tondiarpet, Vallalar Nagar, Basin Bridge, Choolai, Purasaivakkam, K.M.C, Aminjikarai, Arumbakkam	
164	Perambur	Minjur	Moolakkadai, Madhavaram Milk Colony, Mathur, Manali Market, M.F.L, Manali New Town	
166	Tambaram	Iyyappanthangal	Chromepet, Pallavaram, Pammal, Anakaputhur, Manacherry, Kundrathur, Kolachery, Kovur, Gerugambakkam, Moulivakkam, Porur	
170C	Thiru. Vi. Ka Nagar	Guindy I.E	Kolathur, Retteri, Anna Nagar West, Thirumangalam, M.G.R Koyambedu, Arumbakkam Metro, Vadapalani, Ashok Pillar, Ekkattuthangal	Sometimes service will go till M.K.B Nagar via moolakadai (only electric buses)
170K	Peruvallur Kumaran Nagar	Guindy I.E	Kolathur, Retteri, Anna Nagar West, Thirumangalam, M.G.R Koyambedu, Arumbakkam Metro, Vadapalani, Ashok Pillar, Ekkattuthangal	
170T	Tambaram	Kaviarasu Kannadasan Nagar	Chromepet, Pallavaram, Arignar Anna International Airport, Alandur Metro, Ekkattuthangal, Ashok Pillar, Vadapalani, Arumbakkam Metro, M.G.R Koyambedu, Thirumangalam, Anna Nagar West, Retteri, Madhavaram (M.M.B.T), Moolakadai, Erukkanchery	
188A	Thiyagaraya Nagar	Kundrathur	Saidapet, Little Mount, Guindy, Kathipara, Nandambakkam, Mugalivakkam, Madhanandapuram, Moulivakkam, Gerugambakkam, Kovur, Kolachery	
188C	Broadway	Kundrathur	M.G.R Central, P.OR.R Sons, L.I.C, D.M.S, Teynampet, Nandanam, Saidapet, Little Mount, Guindy, Kathipara, Nandambakkam, Manapakkam, Kolapakkam, Gerugambakkam, Kovur, Kolachery	
188K	Thiyagaraya Nagar	Kattrambakkam	Saidapet, Little Mount, Guindy, Kathipara, Nandambakkam, Porur, Moulivakkam, Gerugambakkam, Kovur, Kolachery, Kundrathur, Kaladipet, Somangalam	
202	Avadi	Tambaram West	Kavarapalayam, Sekkadu, Pattabiram, Thandurai, Sitharkudu Bypass, Chillakarayapuram, Pazhanthandalam, Erumaiyur, Old Perungalathur, Tambaram Town Limit	
202A	Avadi	Tambaram West	Kavarapalayam, Sekkadu, Pattabiram, Thandurai, Annaikattucherry, Sitharkudu Bypass, Chillakarayapuram, Pazhanthandalam, Erumaiyur, Old Perungalathur, Tambaram Town Limit	
206	Avadi	Guduvanchery	Govardanagiri, Parithipattu, Karayanchavadi, Mangadu, Kundrathur, Pazhanthandalam, Erumaiyur, Vandaloor Gate, Vandaloor Zoo, Kilambakkam (K.C.B.T)	
207	Thiruverkadu	Kilambakkam (K.C.B.T)	Gurimedai, Perumal Nagar Junction, Velappanchavadi, Kumanan Chavadi, Poonamallee, Chillakarayapuram, Pazhanthandalam, Erumaiyur, Old Perungalathur, Perungalathur, Vandaloor, Vandaloor Zoo	
221	M.G.R Central	Thiruporur	P.OR.R Sons, L.I.C, D.M.S, Teynampet, Nandanam, Saidapet, Little Mount, Anna University, Madhya Kailash, Tidel Park, Kandanchavadi, Perungudi, Sholinganallur, Chemmanchery, Navalur, Siruchery, Padur, Kelambakkam	Sometime till Kelambakkam
242	Broadway	Redhills	M.G.R Central, Periyamedu, Vepery, Doveton, Otteri, Jamaliya, Perambur, Venus, Kolathur, Retteri, Vinayagapuram, Kavankarai	
266	Tambaram	Avadi	Chromepet, Pallavaram, Pammal, Anakaputhur, Manacherry, Kundrathur, Chikkarayapuram, Mangadu, Karayanchavadi, Kaaduveti, Govaradhanagiri	
297	Kilambakkam (K.C.B.T)	Thiruvallur	Thirumudivakkam SIDCO, Poonamallee, Nazarathpet, Thirumazhisai, Vellavedu, Aranvoyal, Tirur, Manavala Nagar	
500	Tambaram	Chengalpattu	Perungalathur, Vandaloor Zoo, Kilambakkam (K.C.B.T), Guduvanchery, Potheri, Maraimalai Nagar, Singaperumal Koil, Paranur, Pulipakkam	
500A	Hasthinapuram	Chengalpattu	Kumaran Kundram, Tambaram Sanatorium R.S, Tambaram, Perungalathur, Vandaloor Zoo, Kilambakkam (K.C.B.T), Guduvanchery, Potheri, Maraimalai Nagar, Singaperumal Koil, Paranur, Pulipakkam	
500D	Durga Nagar	Chengalpattu	Tambaram Sanatorium, Tambaram, Perungalathur, Vandaloor Zoo, Kilambakkam (K.C.B.T), Guduvanchery, Potheri, Maraimalai Nagar, Singaperumal Koil, Paranur, Pulipakkam	
500E	Tambaram	Echankarnai	Perungalathur, Vandaloor Zoo, Kilambakkam (K.C.B.T), Guduvanchery, Potheri, Maraimalai Nagar, Singaperumal Koil	
500P	Pallavaram	Chengalpattu	Chrompet, Tambaram, Perungalathur, Vandaloor Zoo, Kilambakkam (K.C.B.T), Guduvanchery, Potheri, Maraimalai Nagar, Singaperumal Koil, Paranur, Pulipakkam	
500R	Tambaram	Maraimalai Nagar	Tambaram, Perungalathur, Vandaloor Zoo, Kilambakkam (K.C.B.T), Guduvanchery, Rajeshwari Nagar, East Potheri, Rail Nagar	
500W	West Saidapet	Chengalpattu	Saidapet, Little Mount, Guindy, Alandur Metro, Arignar Anna International Airport, Pallavaram, Chrompet, Tambaram, Perungalathur, Vandaloor Zoo, Kilambakkam (K.C.B.T), Guduvanchery, Potheri, Maraimalai Nagar, Singaperumal Koil, Paranur, Pulipakkam	
505	Redhills	Thiruvallur	Gandhi Nagar West, Rajakalam, Alamathi, Poochi Athipet, Thamaraipakkam, Velliyur, Keelanur, Otikkadu, Ikkadu	
512	Redhills	Madarapakkam	Padianallur, Sholavaram, Karanodai, Janapanchatram, Puduvoyal, Kavarapet, Suravarikandigai, Thanipoondi	
514	M.G.R Koyambedu	Periyapalayam	Thirumangalam, Anna Nagar West, Lucas, Retteri, Madhavaram (M.M.B.T), Puzhal, Kavangarai, Redhills, Padiayanallur, Sholavaram, Karanodai, Janapanchatram, Thanakulam, Panapakkam	
515	Tambaram	Mamallapuram	Perungalathur, Vandaloor Zoo, Kolapakkam, Rathinamangalam, Kandigai, Killakottaiyur, Mambakkam, Pudupakkam, Kelambakkam, Thiruporur, Karungudi Pallam, Pandithamedu, Payyanur, Poonjeri	
515A	Tambaram	Kovalam	Perungalathur, Vandaloor Zoo, Kolapakkam, Rathinamangalam, Kandigai, Killakottaiyur, Mambakkam, Pudupakkam, Kelambakkam	
515B	Tambaram	Thiruporur	Perungalathur, Vandaloor Zoo, Kolapakkam, Rathinamangalam, Kandigai, Killakottaiyur, Mambakkam, Pudupakkam, Kelambakkam	
515K	Kilambakkam (K.C.B.T)	Kovalam	Kolapakkam, Rathinamangalam, Kandigai, Killakottaiyur, Mambakkam, Pudupakkam, Kelambakkam	
515M	Kilambakkam (K.C.B.T)	Mamallapuram	Kolapakkam, Rathinamangalam, Kandigai, Killakottaiyur, Mambakkam, Pudupakkam, Kelambakkam, Thiruporur, Karungudi Pallam, Pandithamedu, Payyanur, Poonjeri	
515T	Kilambakkam (K.C.B.T)	Thiruporur	Kolapakkam, Rathinamangalam, Kandigai, Killakottaiyur, Mambakkam, Pudupakkam, Kelambakkam	
517K	Pallavaram	Kovalam	Chrompet, Tambaram, Perungalathur, Vandaloor Zoo, Kolapakkam, Rathinamangalam, Kandigai, Killakottaiyur, Mambakkam, Pudupakkam, Kelambakkam	
519T	Adyar	Thaiyur Koman Nagar	S.R.P Tools, Kandanchavadi, Perungudi, Sholinganallur, Chemmenchery, Navalur, Siruchery, Padur, Kelambakkam	
523	Thiruvanmiyur	Perunthandalam	Tidel Park, S.R.P Tools, Kandanchavadi, Perungudi, Sholinganallur, Chemmenchery, Navalur, Siruchery, Padur, Kelambakkam, Thiruporur, Karumbakkam, Mulipakkam	
523A	Thiruvanmiyur	Devi Kar Amman Koil	Tidel Park, S.R.P Tools, Kandanchavadi, Perungudi, Sholinganallur, Chemmenchery, Navalur, Siruchery, Padur, Kelambakkam, Thiruporur, Karumbakkam, Mulipakkam, Perunthandalam	
525	Vadapalani	Sunguvarchatram	Virugambakkam, Valasaravakkam, Porur, Iyyappanthangal, Kumanan Chavadi, Poonamallee, Nazarathpet, Thirumazhisai, Chembarambakkam, Irungattukottai, Sriperumbudur, Vadamangalam	
549	Thiruvanmiyur	Sriperumbudur	Adyar, Madhya Kailash, Anna University, Little Mount, Guindy, Kathipara, Ramapuram, Porur, Iyyappanthangal, Kumanan Chavadi, Poonamallee, Nazarathpet, Thirumazhisai, Chembarambakkam, Irungattukottai	
552K	Kilkattalai	Thiruporur	Echangadu, Kovilambakkam, Vellaikal, Medavakkam, Sholinganallur, Chemmanchery, Navalur, Siruchery, Padur, Kelambakkam	
553	M.G.R Koyambedu	Sunguvarchatram	Rohini Theatre, Nerkundram, Maduravoyal, Velappanchavadi, Kumanan Chavadi, Poonamallee, Nazarathpet, Thirumazhisai, Chembarambakkam, Irungattukottai, Sriperumbudur, Vadamangalam	
553K	M.G.R Koyambedu	Katrambakkam	Rohini Theatre, Nerkundram, Maduravoyal, Velappanchavadi, Kumanan Chavadi, Poonamallee, Nazarathpet, Thirumazhisai, Chembarambakkam, Irungattukottai	
553W	West Saidapet	Sriperumbudur	Ashok Pillar, Vadapalani, Arumbakkam Metro, M.G.R Koyambedu, Rohini Theatre, Nerkundram, Maduravoyal, Velappanchavadi, Kumananchavadi, Poonamallee, Nazarathpet, Thirumazhisai, Chembarambakkam, Irungattukottai	
554E	Ekkattuthangal	Sunguvarchatram	Kathipara, Nandambakkam, Porur, Iyyappanthangal, Kumanan Chavadi, Poonamallee, Nazarathpet, Thirumazhisai, Chembarambakkam, Irungattukottai, Sriperumbudur, Vadamangalam	
555G	Sholinganallur	Guduvanchery	Chemmanchery, Navalur, Siruchery, Padur, Kelambakkam Chettinad Hospital, Pudupakkam, Mambakkam, Killakottaiyur, Kandigai, Rathinamangalam, Kolapakkam, Vandaloor Zoo, Kilambakkam (K.C.B.T)	
555M	Tambaram	Thiruporur	Perungalathur, Vandaloor Zoo, Kolapakkam, Rathinamangalam, Kandigai, Killakottaiyur, Mambakkam, Kolathur, Pungeri, Kattur, Illayur Junction	
555N	Guduvanchery	Thiruporur	Perumanttunallur, Kannivakkam, Pondur, Nellikuppam Colony, Kattur, Illayur Junction	
555P	Sholinganallur	Padappai	Chemmanchery, Navalur, Siruchery, Padur, Kelambakkam Chettinad Hospital, Pudupakkam, Mambakkam, Killakottaiyur, Kandigai, Rathinamangalam, Kolapakkam, Vandaloor Zoo, Vandaloor Gate, Mannivakkam	
555S	Sholinganallur	Kilambakkam (K.C.B.T)	Chemmanchery, Navalur, Siruchery, Padur, Kelambakkam Chettinad Hospital, Pudupakkam, Mambakkam, Killakottaiyur, Kandigai, Rathinamangalam, Kolapakkam, Vandaloor Zoo	
556	Thiruvottriyur	Kattupalli	Wimco Nagar, Mullai Nagar, Sathangadu, M.F.L, Andarkuppam, Nappalayam, Pattamandiri, Vallur, Athipattu, Kamarajar Port	
557	Madhavaram (M.M.B.T)	Gummidipoondi	Puzhal, Kavankarai, Redhills, Padianallur, Sholavaram, Karanodai, Janapanchatram, Peravallur, Puduvayal, Kavarapet, Verkadu	Sometimes Depart from Broadway and Redhills
557C	Redhills	Kallur	Padianallur, Sholavaram, Karanodai, Janapanchatram, Peravallur, Puduvayal, Kavarapet, Verkadu, Gummidipoondi, Elavur, Sunnambukulam, Sudukadu	
557M	Redhills	Madarapakkam	Padianallur, Sholavaram, Karanodai, Janapanchatram, Peravallur, Puduvayal, Kavarapet, Suravarikandigai, Poovalmbedu, Amarambedu, Nomalur	
558A	Redhills	Minjur	Padianallur, Sholavaram, Karanodai, Janapanchatram, Thachur, Andarkuppam, Ponneri, Vanakkam, Sanarpalayam, Nalur	
558B	Redhills	Pazhaverkadu	Padianallur, Sholavaram, Karanodai, Janapanchatram, Thachur, Andarkuppam, Ponneri, Uppalam, Methur, Thirupalaivanam, Pakkam, Andarmadam	During Cut Service Depart From Ponneri
558C	Redhills	Pudhucherimedu	Padianallur, Sholavaram, Karanodai, Janapanchatram, Thachur, Andarkuppam, Ponneri, Uppalam, Methur, Kolur	
558L	M.G.R Koyambedu	Minjur	Thirumangalam, Anna Nagar West, Lucas, Retteri, Madhavaram (M.M.B.T), Puzhal, Kavankarai, Redhills, Padianallur, Sholavaram, Karanodai, Janapanchatram, Thachur, Andarkuppam, Pulikulam, Sanarpalayam, Nalur	
558P	Redhills	Perumbedukuppam	Padianallur, Sholavaram, Karanodai, Janapanchatram, Thachur, Andarkuppam, Ponneri, Chinnakavanam, Lakshmipuram, Perumbedu	
565	Avadi	Sriperumbudur	Govardanagiri, Paruthipattu, Kaduvetti, Parivakkam, Poonamallee, Nazarathpet, Thirumazhisai, Chembarambakkam, Irungattukottai	
566	Kundrathur	Thiruporur	Manachery, Anakaputhur, Pammal, Pallavaram, Chrompet, Tambaram, Perungalathur, Vandaloor Zoo, Kolapakkam, Rathinamangalam, Kandigai, Killakottaiyur, Mambakkam, Pudupakkam, Kelambakkam	
566B	Pattur	Kovalam	Kolachery, Kundrathur, Manachery, Anakaputhur, Pammal, Pallavaram, Chrompet, Tambaram, Perungalathur, Vandaloor Zoo, Kolapakkam, Rathinamangalam, Kandigai, Killakottaiyur, Mambakkam, Pudupakkam, Kelambakkam	
568B	Velachery	Thiruporur	Tharamani, S.R.P Tools, Kandanchavadi, Perungudi, Sholinganallur, Chemmanchery, Navalur, Siruchery, Padur, Kelambakkam	
570	M.G.R Koyambedu	Kelambakkam	Arumbakkam Metro, Vadapalani, Ashok Pillar, Ekkattuthangal, Guindy, Checkpost, Velachery, Tharamani, S.R.P Tools, Kandanchavadi, Perungudi, Sholinganallur, Chemmanchery, Navalur, Siruchery, Padur	
570B	M.G.R Koyambedu	Okkiyam Thoraipakkam Sec. Colony	Arumbakkam Metro, Vadapalani, Ashok Pillar, Ekkatuthangal, Guindy, Checkpost, Velachery, Tharamani, S.R.P Tools, Kandanchavadi, Perungudi	
570C	M.G.R Koyambedu	Kannagi Nagar S.C.B	Arumbakkam Metro, Vadapalani, Ashok Pillar, Ekkatuthangal, Guindy, Checkpost, Velachery, Tharamani, S.R.P Tools, Kandanchavadi, Perungudi, Mettukuppam	
570P	M.G.R Koyambedu	Perumbakkam S.C.B	Arumbakkam Metro, Vadapalani, Ashok Pillar, Ekkatuthangal, Guindy, Checkpost, Velachery, Tharamani, S.R.P Tools, Kandanchavadi, Perungudi, Sholinganallur, Nucleus Company	
570S	M.G.R Koyambedu	Siruchery I.T Park	Arumbakkam Metro, Vadapalani, Ashok Pillar, Ekkatuthangal, Guindy, Checkpost, Velachery, Tharamani, S.R.P Tools, Kandanchavadi, Perungudi, Sholinganallur, Chemmanchery, Navalur | Morning 5:30am to 8am available From MMBT	
570T	M.G.R Koyambedu	Thalambur	Arumbakkam Metro, Vadapalani, Ashok Pillar, Ekkatuthangal, Guindy, Checkpost, Velachery, Tharamani, S.R.P Tools, Kandanchavadi, Perungudi, Sholinganallur, Chemmanchery, Navalur	
570V	Vadapalani	Kelambakkam	Ashok Pillar, Ekkatuthangal, Guindy, Checkpost, Velachery, Tharamani, S.R.P Tools, Kandanchavadi, Perungudi, Sholinganallur, Chemmanchery, Navalur, Siruchery, Padur	
572	Avadi	Thiruvallur	Kavarapalayam, Pattabiram, Amudurmedu, Nemilichery, Thiruninravur, Veppampattu, Sevvapet, Kakkalur	
572A	Avadi	Thiruvallur Collector Off.	Kavarapalayam, Pattabiram, Amudurmedu, Nemilichery, Thiruninravur, Veppampattu, Thottikalai, Vellakulam, Kakkalur	
572K	Ambathur I.E	Kilanur	Ambathur O.T, Thirumullaivoyal, Avadi, Kavarapalayam, Pattabiram, Amudurmedu, Nemilichery, Thiruninravur, Veppampattu, Sevvapet, Vellakulam, Chithathur Colony, Vishnuvakkam	
578	Poonamallee	Sunguvarchatram	Nazarathpet, Thirumazhisai, Chembarambakkam, Irungattukottai, Sriperumbudur, Vadamangalam	
578A	Kundrathur	Sriperumbudur	Sirukalathur, Nandambakkam, Somangalam, Nallur, Kattrambakkam, Amarambedu, Mariyamman Kovil	
579A	Tambaram Sanatorium	Walajabad	Tambaram West, Tambaram Town Limit, Old Perungalathur, Mudichur, Mannivakkam, Paddapai, Oragadam, Thalampet, Oothukadu	
579C	Tambaram Sanatorium	Walajabad	Tambaram, Perungalathur, Vandaloor Gate, Mannivakkam, Paddapai, Oragadam, Thalampet, Oothukadu	
579K	Kilambakkam (K.C.B.T)	Walajabad	Vandaloor Zoo, Vandaloor Gate, Mannivakkam, Paddapai, Oragadam, Thalampet, Oothukadu	
580	Avadi	Arani	Kavarapalayam, Pattabiram, Amudurmedu, Nemilichery, Thiruninravur, Pakkam, Kavanur, Komakkambedu, Thamaraipakkam, Vengal, Vadamadurai, Periyapalayam, Kosavanpettai	
580A	Avadi	Mel Sembedu	Kavarapalayam, Pattabiram, Amudurmedu, Nemilichery, Thiruninravur, Pakkam, Kavanur, Komakkambedu, Thamaraipakkam, Kaatharvedu	
580M	Thiruninravur	Malanthur	Pakkam, Kavanur, Komakkambedu, Thamaraipakkam, Vengal	
580S	Avadi	Siruvapuri	Kavarapalayam, Pattabiram, Amudurmedu, Nemilichery, Thiruninravur, Pakkam, Kavanur, Komakkambedu, Thamaraipakkam, Vengal, Vadamadurai, Periyapalayam, Kosavanpettai, Arani, Agaram	
583	Tambaram Sanatorium	Sriperumbudur	Tambaram West, Tambaram Town Limit, Old Perungalathur, Mudichur, Mannivakkam, Paddapai, Oragadam, Mathur, Therasapuram	
583A	Thiruvallur	Sriperumbudur	Manavala Nagar, Melnallathur, Polivakkam, Sengadu, Parangusattram, Thodukadu	
583C	Tambaram Sanatorium	Sriperumbudur	Tambaram West, Tambaram Town Limit, Old Perungalathur, Mudichur, Mannivakkam, Manimangalam, Malaipattu, Mariyamman Kovil	
583D	Tambaram Sanatorium	Sriperumbudur	Tambaram West, Tambaram Town Limit, Old Perungalathur, Mullai Nagar Ernavoor, Manimangalam, Malaipattu, Mariyamman Kovil	
583K	Kilambakkam (K.C.B.T)	Sriperumbudur	Vandaloor Zoo, Vandaloor Gate, Mannivakkam, Paddapai, Oragadam, Mathur, Therasapuram	
588	Thiruvanmiyur	Mamallapuram	Palavakkam, Neelankarai, Injambakkam, Kanathur, Muttukadu, Kovalam, Thiruvidhanthai, Vadanemmeli, Sulerikadu, Pattipulam, Devaneri, Sculpture Arts College	
591	Poonamallee	Perambakkam	Nazarathpet, Thirumazhisai, Chembarambakkam, Thandalam, Mevalurukuppam, Mannur, Ulandhai, Mappedu, Covam	
591C	Poonamallee	Perambakkam L.N Koil	Nazarathpet, Thirumazhisai, Chembarambakkam, Thandalam, Mevalurukuppam, Mannur, Ulandhai, Mappedu, Covam, Perambakkam	
592	Redhills	Uthukottai	Padianallur, Semilivaram, Sholavaram, Karanodai, Janapanchatram, Manjankaranai, Erikarai, Panapakkam, Periyapalayam, Athupakkam, Thandalam, Ellampettai	
592V	Redhills	Vengal	Padianallur, Semilivaram, Sholavaram, Karanodai, Janapanchatram, Manjankaranai, Erikarai, Panapakkam, Pettaimedu	
595	Pazhaverkadu	Tollgate,	Andarmadam, Pakkam, Palayambakkam, Kattur, Thiru Vellivoyal, Vayalur, Minjur, Nandiyambakkam, Nappalayam, Andarkuppam, M.F.L, Sathangadu, Wimco Nagar, Thiruvottriyur, Theradi	
597	Thiyagaraya Nagar	Thiruvallur	Saidapet, Little Mount, Guindy Kathipara, Nandambakkam, Porur, Iyyappanthangal, Kumanan Chavadi, Poonamallee, Nazarathpet, Thirumazhisai, Vellavedu, Aranvoyal, Tirur, Manavala Nagar	
597A	Poonamallee	Thiruvallur	Nazarathpet, Thirumazhisai, Vellavedu, Aranvoyal, Tirur, Manavala Nagar	
597C	Poonamallee	Thiruninravur R.S	Nazarathpet, Thirumazhisai, Vellavedu, Puduchatram, Kottamedu, Ponniymmanmedu	

=== Letter Prefixed Routes ===
Route	Origin	Destination	Via	Route Map
A1	M.G.R Central	Thiruvanmiyur	P.OR.R Sons, L.I.C, Royapettah, Mylapore, Mandaveli, Adyar	
A45B	Anna Square	Nandambakkam	Triplicane, Ratna Cafe, Vivekananda House, Q.M.C, Luz, Alwarpet, Teynampet, Nandanam, Saidapet, Little Mount, Guindy	
A47	Thiruvanmiyur	Avadi	Adyar, Madhya Kailash, Anna University, Little Mount, Saidapet, Thiyagaraya Nagar, Valluvar Kottam, Loyola College, Roundana, Anna Nagar West, Padi, Lucas, Ambathur O.T	
A51	Broadway	Tambaram East	M.G.R Central, P.OR.R Sons, L.I.C, D.M.S, Teynampet, Nandanam, Saidapet, Little Mount, Velachery, Pallikaranai, Medavakkam, Sembakkam, Selaiyur	
B19	Sholinganallur	Kelambakkam	Chemmanchery, Navalur, Siruchery, Padur	
C56C	Thiruvottriyur	Broadway	Theradi, Tollgate, Tondiarpet, Kalmandapam, Royapuram, Beach Station	
D70	Ambathur I.E	Velachery	Vaavin, Collector Nagar, Thirumangalam, M.G.R Koyambedu, Arumbakkam Metro, Vadapalani, Ashok Pillar, Ekkattuthangal, Guindy, Little Mount, Check Post	
E18	Broadway	Guduvanchery	M.G.R Central, P.OR.R Sons, L.I.C, D.M.S, Teynampet, Nandanam, Saidapet, Little Mount, Guindy, Alandur Metro, Arignar Anna International Airport, Pallavaram, Chromepet, Tambaram, Perungalathur, Vandaloor Zoo, Kilambakkam (K.C.B.T)	
E51	Broadway	Ottiyambakkam	M.G.R Central, P.OR.R Sons, L.I.C, D.M.S, Teynampet, Nandanam, Saidapet, Little Mount, Velachery, Pallikaranai, Medavakkam, Chithalapakam, Arasankazhani	
F70	Pattabiram	Guindy I.E	Kavarapalayam, Avadi, Thirumullaivoyal, Ambathur O.T, Lucas, Anna Nagar West, Thirumangalam, M.G.R Koyambedu, Arumbakkam Metro, Vadapalani, Ashok Pillar, Jafferkhanpet	
G18	Thiyagaraya Nagar	Guduvanchery	Saidapet, Little Mount, Guindy, Alandur Metro, Arignar Anna International Airport, Pallavaram, Chromepet, Tambaram, Perungalathur, Vandaloor Zoo, Kilambakkam (K.C.B.T)	
J51	Velachery	Venkadamangalam	Pallikaranai, Medavakkam, Madurapakkam, Ponmar	
J66	Tambaram	Poonamallee	Thiruneermalai, Vazhuthalambedu, Kundrathur Murugan Temple, Kundrathur, Mangadu, Kumanan Chavadi	
M1	Kilkattalai	Thiruvanmiyur	Madipakkam, Kaiveli, Velachery, Tharamani, S.R.P Tools	
M1A	Nanganallur	Thiruvanmiyur	Moovarasampet, Madipakkam, Kaiveli, Velachery, Tharamani, S.R.P Tools	
M18	Tambaram	Kilambakkam (K.C.B.T)	Perungalathur, Vandaloor Zoo	
M18C	Kilkattalai	Thiyagaraya Nagar	Moovarasampet, Nanganallur, Pazhavanthangal, Alandur Metro, Guindy, Little Mount, Saidapet	
M18G	Guduvanchery	Hasthinapuram	Kilambakkam (K.C.B.T), Vandaloor Zoo, Perungalathur, Tambaram	
M18N	Guduvanchery	Nanganallur	Kilambakkam (K.C.B.T), Vandaloor Zoo, Perungalathur, Tambaram, Chromepet, Pallavaram, Arignar Anna International Airport, Pazhavanthangal	
M19B	Thiyagaraya Nagar	Kannagi Nagar S.C.B	Saidapet, Little Mount, Gandhi Mandapam, Madhya Kailash, Tidel Park, S.R.P Tools, Perungudi, Mettukuppam	
M27	M.G.R Koyambedu	Thiyagaraya Nagar	Koyambedu Market, Chinmaya Nagar, Virugambakkam, Vadapalani, Liberty, Bharathi Nagar	
M51	Thiyagaraya Nagar	Sholinganallur	Saidapet, Little Mount, Checkpost, Velachery, Pallikaranai, Medavakkam, Chitlapakkam, Arasankazhani	
M51D	Saidapet	Kelambakkam	Little Mount, Checkpost, Velachery, Pallikaranai, Medavakkam, Chitlapakkam, Arasankazhani, Ottiyambkkam, Karanai, Thalambur, Siruchery, Pudupakkam	
M51R	Broadway	Puzhuthivakkam	Secretariat, Anna Square, Chepauk, L.I.C, D.M.S, Teynampet, Nandanam, Saidapet, Little Mount, Guindy, N.G.O Colony, Adambakkam	
M51V	Thiyagaraya Nagar	Kolathur	Saidapet, Little Mount, Checkpost, Velachery, Pallikaranai, Medavakkam, Chitlapakkam, Ponmar, Mambakkam	
M60	Thiyagaraya Nagar	Nandambakkam Kalaignar Nagar	Saidapet, Little Mount, Guindy, Kathipara, Nandambakkam, Porur, Moulivakkam, Gerungambakkam, Kovur, Kolachery, Kundrathur, Sirukalathur	
M70	M.G.R Koyambedu	Thiruvanmiyur	Arumbakkam Metro, Vadapalani, Ashok Pillar, Ekkattuthangal, Guindy, Velachery, Tharamani, S.R.P Tools	
M88	Vadapalani	Kundrathur Murugan Temple	Virugambakkam, Valasaravakkam, Porur, Moulivakkam, Gerugambakkam, Kovur, Kolachery, Kundrathur	
M88T	Vadapalani	Amarambedu East	Virugambakkam, Valasaravakkam, Porur, Moulivakkam, Gerugambakkam, Kovur, Kolachery, Kundrathur, Nandambakkam, Somangalam, Nallur, Puduppair	
MAA1	Chennai International Airport	Kilambakkam (K.C.B.T)	Pallavaram, Chromepet, Tambaram, Vandalur Zoo	
MAA2	Chennai International Airport	Akkarai	Pallavaram, 200 Feet Radial Road, Thoraipakkam, Karapakkam, Sholinganallur	
N45B	Broadway	Moovarsampet	Secretariat, Anna Square, Ratna Cafe, Vivekananda House, Q.M.C, Luz, Alwarpet, Teynampet, Nandanam, Saidapet, Little Mount, Guindy, Alandur Metro, Pazhavanthangal, Nanganallur	
T19	Okkiyam Thoraipakkam Sec. Colony	Thiruporur	Okkiyampet, Sholinganallur, Chemmanchery, Navalur, Siruchery, Pattur, Kelambakkam	
T23C	Thiruvanmiyur	Ayanavaram	Adyar, Madhya Kailash, Anna University, Little Mount, Saidapet, Nandanam, Teynampet, D.M.S, L.I.C, Pudupet, Egmore, Dasaprakash, Purasaivakkam, Kellys	
T29	Thiruvanmiyur	Thiru. Vi. Ka Nagar	Adyar, Mandaveli, Mylapore, Royapettah, L.I.C, Pudupet, Egmore, Dasaprakash, Purasaivakkam, Doveton, Otteri, Jamaliya, Perambur, Venus	
T29C	Thiruvanmiyur	Perambur	Adyar, Mandaveli, Mylapore, Stella Mary College, Gemini, Sterling Road, Chetpet, K.M.C, Purasaivakkam, Doveton, Otteri, Jamaliya	
V51	Thiyagaraya Nagar	Tambaram West	Saidapet, Little Mount, Guindy, Checkpost, Velachery, Kaiveli, Madipakkam, Kilkattalai, Kovilambakkam, Vellaikal, Medavakkam Koot Road, Sembakkam, Selaiyur, Tambaram East	

=== Cut Service Bus Routes ===
The aforementioned cut/curtailment services primarily function as feeder services for depots such as Alandur, M.G.R Central, Tondiarpet, Thiruvottriyur, Thiruvanmiyur, Vadapalani, Iyyappanthangal, Poonamallee, Perumbakkam, Saidapet, Avadi, Ambathur, Adyar, Ayanavaram, Anna Nagar West, Kalaignar Nagar, Madhavaram, and Perambur, in addition to regular routes including 26, 102, and others.

Route	Starting Point	Ending Point	Route Description
2A	Anna Square	M.G.R Central	War Memorial, Pallavan Salai
3	Tidel Park	Guindy Race Course	S.R.P Tools, Tharamani, Velachery
5C	Broadway	Adyar	M.G.R Central, P.OR.R Sons, L.I.C, Royapettah, Music Academy, Alwarpet, Adyar Gate, Kotturpuram, Madhya Kailash
5G	Velachery	Kannagi Nagar S.C.B	Tharamani, Kandanchavadi, Perungudi
6D	Tollgate,	Foreshore Estate	Tondiarpet, Royapuram, Beach Station, Secretariat, Marina Beach, Q.M.C, Santhome
8A	Vallalar Nagar	Tollgate,	Thambu Chetty, Royapuram, Kalmandapam, Kasimedu
13	Thiyagaraya Nagar	Triplicane	Vani Mahal, Thousand Lights, Gopalapuram, Royapettah, Pycroft Road
18A	Guindy I.E	Kilambakkam (K.C.B.T)	Alandur Metro, Airport, Pallavaram, Chromepet, Tambaram, Perungalathur, Vandaloor Zoo
18K	M.G.R Central	West Saidapet	P.OR.R Sons, L.I.C, D.M.S, Teynampet, Nandanam, Mettupalayam
21E	Island Grounds	Nandambakkam/ Ramapuram	Parrys Corner, Secretariat, Marina Beach, Q.M.C, Santhome, Foreshore Estate, Adyar, Madhya Kailash, Anna University, Guindy, Kathipara
21G	Island Grounds	Tambaram	Parrys Corner, Secretariat, Marina Beach, Q M.C, Mylapore, Mandaveli, Adyar Gate, Kotturpuram, Anna University, Guindy, Alandur Metro, Airport, Pallavaram, Chromepet
21G	Island Grounds	Alandur Court	Parrys Corner, Secretariat, Marina Beach, Q M.C, Mylapore, Mandaveli, Adyar Gate, Kotturpuram, Anna University, Guindy
21G	Mylapore	Kilambakkam (K.C.B.T)	Mandaveli, Adyar Gate, Kotturpuram, Anna University, Guindy, Alandur Metro, Airport, Pallavaram, Chromepet, Tambaram, Perungalathur, Vandaloor Zoo
23C	Besant Nagar	Egmore	Adyar, Madhya Kailash, Anna University, Little Mount, Saidapet, Nandanam, Teynampet, D.M.S, L.I.C, Pudupet
23C	Saidapet	Ayanavaram	Nandanam, Teynampet, D.M.S, L.I.C, Pudupet, Egmore, Dasaprakash, Purasaivakkam, Kellys
25	Anna Square	Iyyappanthangal	Marina Beach, Royapettah, Gemini, Palmgrove, Liberty, Vadapalani, Valasaravakkam, Porur
25	Anna Square	Vadapalani	Marina Beach, Royapettah, Gemini, Palmgrove, Liberty
26	Broadway	Vadapalani	M.G.R Central, P.OR.R Sons, L.I.C, Gemini, Palmgrove, Liberty
27B	Anna Square	M.M.D.A Colony	Triplicane, P.OR.R Sons, Chindathiripet, Egmore, Chetpet, Aminjikarai
28A	Manali New Town	Vallalar Nagar	Elanthur, Sathangadu, Wimco Nagar, Thiruvottriyur, Theradi, Tollgate, Tondiarpet
29A	Egmore	Perambur	Dasaprakash, Purasaivakkam, Doveton, Otteri, Jamaliya
29C	Sterling Road	Perambur	Chetpet, K.M.C, Purasaivakkam, Otteri, Jamaliya
29E	M.G.R Koyambedu	Perambur	Arumbakkam, Aminjikarai, Kellys, Purasaivakkam, Otteri, Jamaliya
35	Broadway	Ayanavaram	M.G.R Central, Periyamedu, Vepery, Doveton, Otteri
37	Vallalar Nagar	Dasarathapuram	Basin Bridge, Choolai, Purasaivakkam, Dasaprakash, K.M.C, Chetpet, Sterling Road, Valluvar Kottam, Liberty, Vadapalani
37E	M.K.B Nagar	Vadapalani	Sidco, Kannigapuram, Pattalam, Doveton, Vepery, Egmore, D.P.I, Sterling Road, Valluvar Kottam, Liberty
44	Broadway	I.O.C	Beach Station, Thambu Chetty, Vallalar Nagar, Tondiarpet
45A	Vivekananda House	N.G.O Colony	Royapettah, Music Academy, Alwarpet, Adyar Gate, Nandanam, Saidapet, Little Mount, Velachery, Kaiveli
45B	Vivekananda House	Guindy I.E	Q.M.C, Luz, Alwarpet, Teynampet, Nandanam, Saidapet, Little Mount
47D	Thiyagaraya Nagar	Korattur	Valluvar Kottam, Sterling Road, Loyola College, Roundana, Thirumangalam, Anna Nagar West, Padi, Lucas
48	Vallalar Nagar	Ayanavaram	Basin Bridge, Pulianthope, Otteri
54	Broadway	Iyyappanthangal	M.G.R Central, P.OR.R Sons, L.I.C, D.M.S, Teynampet, Nandanam, Saidapet, Little Mount, Guindy, Kathipara, Nandambakkam, Porur
54V	Poonamallee	Veppampattu R.S	Varadharaja Puram, Thirumazhisai, Vellavedu, Nemam, Perumalpattu
57	Vallalar Nagar	Moolakadai	Basin Bridge, Vyasarpadi
57x	Moolakadai	Periyapalayam	Madhavaram (M.M.B.T), Puzhal, Kavankarai, Redhills, Padianallur, Semilivaram, Sholavaram, Karanodai, Janapanchatram, Manjankaranai, Erikarai, Panapakkam
57C	Vallalar Nagar	Gnayaru	Basin Bridge, Vyasarpadi, Moolakadai, Madhavaram (M.M.B.T), Puzhal, Kavankarai, Redhills, Kummanur, Budur, Arumandai
62	Avadi	Redhills	Thirumullaivoyal, Raaki Theatre, Pudhur, Kallikupam, Surapet, Puzhal, Kavangarai
65C	Ambathur I.E	Pakkam Village	Ambathur O.T, Raaki Theatre, Thirumullaivoyal, Avadi, Kavarapalayam, Pattabiram, Annaikattuchery, Nemilichery, Thiruninravur, Melappedu
70C	Ramapuram	Kilambakkam	Arasamaram, Nesapakkam, Ashok Pillar, Ekkattuthangal, Alandur Metro, Arignar Anna International Airport, Pallavaram, Chromepet, Tambaram, Perungalathur, Vandalur Zoo
77F	Vathattur	Avadi	Sivanavoyal, Nathambedu, Thiruninravur, Nemilichery, Amudurmedu, Pattabiram, Kavarapalayam
88	Vadapalani	Porur	Virugambakkam, Valasaravakkam
95x	Sholinganallur	Kilambakkam (K.C.B.T)	Medavakkam, Sembakkam, Selaiyur, Tambaram East, Perungalathur, Vandaloor Zoo
101	Thiruvottriyur	M.G.R Koyambedu	Theradi, Tollgate, Kasimedu, Royapuram, Beach Station, Broadway, M.G.R Central, Egmore North, Dasaprakash, K.M.C, Aminjikarai, Arumbakkam
102	Tidel Park	Siruchery I.T Park	Kandanchavadi, Perungudi, Sholinganallur, Chemmenchery, Navalur
104C	Kilambakkam (K.C.B.T)	M.G.R Koyambedu	Vandaloor Zoo, Perungalathur, Porur Toll Plaza, Maduravoyal, Rohini Theatre
109	Adyar	Kovalam	Thiruvanmiyur, Palavakkam, Injambakkam, Akkarai, Uthandi, Muttukadu
114C	M.G.R Koyambedu	Gnayaru	Thirumangalam, Anna Nagar West, Agrakaram, Retteri, Madhavaram (M.M.B.T), Puzhal, Kavankarai, Redhills, Kummanur, Budur, Arumandai
120	Broadway	Ayanavaram	M.G.R Central, Egmore North, Dasaprakash, Purasaivakkam, Kellys
121	M.G.R Koyambedu	Madhavaram (M.M.B.T)	Thirumangalam, Anna Nagar West, Retteri
221	Broadway	Perumbakkam S.C.B	M.G.R Central, P.OR.R Sons, L.I.C, D.M.S, Teynampet, Nandanam, Saidapet, Little Mount, Gandhi Mandapam, Madhya Kailash, Tidel Park, Kandanchavadi, Perungudi, Sholinganallur, Nucleus Company
242	Perambur	Redhills	Venus, Kolathur, Retteri, Vinayagapuram, Kavankarai
595	Pazhaverkadu	Minjur,	Andarmadam, Pakkam, Palayambakkam, Kattur, Thiru Vellivoyal, Vayalur
B19	Sholinganallur	Siruchery I.T Park	Chemmenchery, Navalur
B70	Guindy I.E	Devik Eswari Nagar	Ekkattuthangal, Ashok Pillar, Vadapalani, Arumbakkam Metro, M.G.R Koyambedu (C.M.BT), Thirumangalam, Anna Nagar West, Padi, Lucas, Ambathur I.E, Ambathur O.T
M88	Porur	Kundrathur Murugan Temple	Moulivakkam, Gerungambakkam, Kovur, Kolachery, Kundrathur

=== EXTN and X Service Bus Routes ===
The "EXTN" services primarily function as feeder services, providing regular connections to various destinations while incorporating additional stops along the current route. The "X" bus routes operate with a consistent frequency of 25 to 30 minutes, particularly the bus service to Kilambakkam (K.C.B.T), as well as routes 102x and 570x to Thiruporur. These routes are also recognized as infrequent bus services.

Route	From	To	Route Stops	
7M	Broadway	Athipet I.C.F Colony	M.G.R Central, Periyamedu, Vepery, Purasaivakkam, Kellys, Chinthamani, Roundana, Thirumangalam, Collector Nagar, Vaavin, Ambathur I.E	
9M	A.G.S Colony	Broadway	Guindy, Little Mount, Saidapet, Teynampet, D.M.S, L.I.C, P.ORR Sons, M.G.R Central	
15B	M.G.R Koyambedu	Odeanmani	Arumbakkam, Aminjikarai, K.M.C, Dasaprakash, Egmore North, M.G.R Central, Broadway, Beach Station, Royapuram, Tondiarpet, Tollgate, Thangal	
19B	Thiyagaraya Nagar	Thaiyur Koman Nagar	Saidapet, Little Mount, Anna University, Madhya Kailash, Kandanchavadi, Perungudi, Sholinganallur, Chemmanchery, Navalur, Siruchery, Padur, Kelambakkam	
23C	Kannagi Nagar	Ayanavaram	Perungudi, S.R.P Tools, Adyar, Madhya Kailash, Anna University, Little Mount, Saidapet, Nandanam, Teynampet, D.M.S, L.I.C, Pudupet, Egmore, Dasaprakash, Purasaivakkam, Kellys	
29	Mandaveli	Vinayagapuram	Mylapore, Royapettah, L.I.C, Pudupet, Egmore, Dasaprakash, Purasaivakkam, Doveton, Otteri, Jamaliya, Perambur, Venus, Kolathur, Retteri	
29A	Anna Square	Periyar Nagar	Triplicane, Pudupet, Egmore, Dasaprakash, Purasaivakkam, Doveton, Otteri, Jamaliya, Perambur, Venus	
29A	Anna Square	Peravallur Kumaran Nagar	Triplicane, Pudupet, Egmore, Dasaprakash, Purasaivakkam, Doveton, Otteri, Jamaliya, Perambur, Venus, Kolathur	
29C	Besant Nagar	Periyar Nagar	Adyar, Mandaveli, Mylapore, Stella Mary College, Gemini, Sterling Road, Chetpet, K.M.C, Purasaivakkam, Otteri, Jamaliya, Perambur, Venus	
29C	Besant Nagar	Srinivasa Nagar	Adyar, Mandaveli, Mylapore, Stella Mary College, Gemini, Sterling Road, Chetpet, K.M.C, Purasaivakkam, Otteri, Jamaliya, Perambur, Venus, Kolathur	
45Bx	Anna Square	Mugalivakkam	Triplicane, Ratna Cafe, Vivekananda House, Q.M.C, Luz, Alwarpet, Teynampet, Nandanam, Saidapet, Little Mount, Guindy, Kathipara, Nandambakkam	
46	M.G.R Koyambedu	Periyar Nagar	Arumbakkam, N.S.K Nagar, Roundana, I.C.F, Ayanavaram, Otteri, Jamaliya, Perambur, Venus	
51Ax	Thiyagaraya Nagar	Kilambakkam (K.C.B.T)	Saidapet, Little Mount, Guindy Race Course, Velachery, Pallikaranai, Medavakkam, Sembakkam, Selaiyur, Tambaram East, Perungalathur, Vandaloor Zoo	
51B	Thiyagaraya Nagar	Ottiyambakkam	Saidapet, Little Mount, Velachery, Pallikaranai, Medavakkam, Chithalapakkam, Arasankazhani	
51x	Velachery	Kilambakkam (K.C.B.T)	Pallikaranai, Medavakkam, Sembakkam, Selaiyur, Tambaram East, Perungalathur, Vandaloor Zoo	
55	Tambaram West	Mannivakkam Kulam	Tambaram Town Limit, Amudham Nagar, Old Perungalathur, Mudichur, Mannivakkam	
55A	Pallavaram	Poonthandalam	Lakshmipuram, Thiruneermalai, Thirumudivakkam, Pazhanthandalam, Vivekananda Nagar, Indira Nagar	
56D	Mathur M.M.D.A	Broadway	Manali, Avurikollaimedu, K.G.L, Tollgate, Kasimedu, Royapuram, Beach Station	
64K	Broadway	Kodungaiyur Parvathi Nagar	M.G.R Central, Periyamedu, Vepery, Doveton, Pattalam, Kannigapuram, Perambur Market, Moolakadai, Erukkancherry, Sidco, Karikadai	
71Ex	Broadway	Thiruninravur	M.G.R Central, Egmore North, Dasaprakash, K.M.C, Kilpauk Garden, V.O.C. Nagar, Sidco Nagar, Lucas, Ambathur, Thirumullaivoyal, Avadi, Kavarapalayam, Pattabiram, Annaikattuchery, Nemilichery	
77V	Koyambakkam	M.G.R Koyambedu	Veppampattu, Thiruninravur, Nemilichery, Amudurmedu, Pattabiram, Kavarapalayam, Avadi, Thirumullaivoyal, Ambathur O.T, Ambathur I.E, Vaavin, Collector Nagar, Thirumangalam	
88C	Thiyagaraya Nagar	Nandambakkam Village	Saidapet, Little Mount, Guindy, Kathipara, Ramapuram, Porur, Moulivakkam, Gerugambakkam, Kovur, Kolachery, Kundrathur, Nandambakkam	
88K	Broadway	Nallur	M.G.R Central, P.OR.R Sons, L.I.C, D.M.S, Teynampet, Nandanam, Saidapet, Little Mount, Guindy, Kathipara, Ramapuram, Porur, Moulivakkam, Gerugambakkam, Kovur, Kolachery, Kundrathur	
91	Guduvanchery	Okkiyam Thoraipakkam Sec. Colony	Kilambakkam (K.C.B.T), Vandaloor Zoo, Perungalathur, Tambaram, Chromepet, Vels University, Eachangadu, Kamatchi Hospital	
95x	Thiruvanmiyur	Kilambakkam (K.C.B.T)	Kandanchavadi, Perungudi, Okkiyampet, Sholinganallur, Medavakkam, Sembakkam, Selaiyur, Tambaram East, Perungalathur, Vandaloor Zoo	
99x	Adyar	Kilambakkam (K.C.B.T)	Thiruvanmiyur, Palavakkam, Neelankarai, Injambakkam, Akkarai, Sholinganallur, Medavakkam, Sembakkam, Selaiyur, Tambaram East, Perungalathur, Vandaloor Zoo	
101x	Broadway	Thirumazhisai	M.G.R Central, Egmore North, Dasaprakash, K.M.C, Aminjikarai, Arumbakkam, Rohini Theatre, Maduravoyal, Velappanchavadi, Kumanan Chavadi, Poonamallee, Nazarathpet	
102x	Island Grounds	Thiruporur	Parrys Corner, Secretariat, Marina Beach, Q.M.C, Santhome, Foreshore Estate, Adyar, Kandanchavadi, Perungudi, Sholinganallur, Chemmenchery, Navalur, Siruchery, Padur, Kelambakkam	Extended to Island Grounds due to Broadway Station renovations.
109x	Island Grounds	Thiruporur	Parrys Corner, Secretariat, Marina Beach, Q.M.C, Santhome, Foreshore Estate, Adyar, Thiruvanmiyur, Palavakkam, Neelankarai, Injambakkam, Kanathur, Muttukadu, Kovalam, Kovalam- Kelambakkam Road, Kelambakkam	Extended to Island Grounds due to Broadway Station renovations.
111x	Kilambakkam (K.C.B.T)	Thiruverkadu	Vandaloor Zoo, Perungalathur, Tambaram, Chromepet, Pallavaram, Arignar Anna International Airport, Alandur Metro, Ekkattuthangal, Ashok Pillar, Vadapalani, Arumbakkam Metro, M.G.R Koyambedu, Maduravoyal, Velappanchavadi, Perumal Nagar Junction, Gurumedai	
114	M.G.R Koyambedu	Mahindra Ind Park	Thirumangalam, Anna Nagar West, Agrakaram, Retteri, Madhavaram (M.M.B.T), Puzhal, Kavankarai, Redhills, Padiayanallur, Sholavaram, Karanodai, Janapanchatram, Peruvallur, Puduvayal	
120K	Broadway	Kilkondaiyur	M.G.R Central, Egmore North, Dasaprakash, Purasaivakkam, Kellys, Ayanavaram, I.C.F, Lucas, Ambathur, Thirumullaivoyal, Avadi, Kovilpathagai, Kannadapalayam, Veerapuram, Arakkambakkam, Kadhavoor	
121M	M.G.R Koyambedu	Manali	Thirumangalam, Anna Nagar West, Retteri, Madhavaram (M.M.B.T), Moolakadai, Madhavaram, Manjampakkam, Mathur	
166x	Kilambakkam (K.C.B.T)	Iyyappanthangal	Vandaloor Zoo, Perungalathur, Tambaram, Chromepet, Pallavaram, Pammal, Anakaputhur, Manacherry, Kundrathur, Kolachery, Kovur, Gerugambakkam, Moulivakkam, Porur	
170C	Manali	Guindy I.E	Mathur, Madhavaram Milk Colony, Moolakadai, Thiru. Vi. Ka Nagar, Kolathur, Retteri, Anna Nagar West, Thirumangalam, M.G.R Koyambedu, Arumbakkam Metro, Vadapalani, Ashok Pillar, Ekkattuthangal	
170Tx	Kilambakkam (K.C.B.T)	Kaviarasu Kannadasan Nagar	Vandaloor Zoo, Perungalathur, Tambaram, Chromepet, Pallavaram, Arignar Anna International Airport, Alandur Metro, Ekkattuthangal, Ashok Pillar, Vadapalani, Arumbakkam Metro, M.G.R Koyambedu, Thirumangalam, Anna Nagar West, Retteri, Madhavaram (M.M.B.T), Moolakadai, Erukkanchery	
202x	Avadi	Kilambakkam (K.C.B.T)	Kavarapalayam, Sekkadu, Pattabiram, Thandurai, Sitharkadu Bypass, Chikkarayapuram, Pazhanthandalam, Erumaiyur, Old Perungalathur, Perungalathur, Vandaloor Zoo	
514	M.G.R Koyambedu	Enambakkam	Thirumangalam, Anna Nagar West, Lucas, Retteri, Madhavaram (M.M.B.T), Puzhal, Kavangarai, Redhills, Padiayanallur, Sholavaram, Karanodai, Janapanchatram, Thanakulam, Panapakkam, Periyapalayam	
557A	Broadway	Annamalaichery	Beach Station, Vallalar Nagar, Basin Bridge, Vyasarpadi, Moolakadai, Madhavaram (M.M.B.T), Puzhal, Kavankarai, Redhills, Padianallur, Sholavaram, Karanodai, Janapanchatram, Peravallur, Puduvayal, Kavarapet, Verkadu, Gummidipoondi, Rettembedu, Kurivigaram Junction, Pananjalai, Agaram, Vepathur	
570x	M.G.R Koyambedu	Thiruporur	Arumbakkam Metro, Vadapalani, Ashok Pillar, Ekkatuthangal, Guindy, Checkpost, Velachery, Tharamani, S.R.P Tools, Kandanchavadi, Perungudi, Sholinganallur, Chemmanchery, Navalur, Siruchery, Padur, Kelambakkam	
578	Poonamallee	Kunnam	Nazarathpet, Thirumazhisai, Chembarambakkam, Irungattukottai, Sriperumbudur	

=== S-Prefixed Bus Routes ===
These Routes are operated by small buses which mainly acts as feeder services for metro stations, railway stations or for interior local neighborhood routes

Route	Origin	Destination	Via
S1	Pallavaram R.S	Thirusulam Sakthi Nagar	Dharga, Sara Nagar
S2	Medavakkam	Chromepet	Sembakkam, Thirumalai Nagar, Hastinapuram, Kumaran Kundram
S3X	Chromepet E.S.I	Noothanchery	Chromepet, Tambaram Sanatorium R.S, Bampan Salai, Mahalakshmi Nagar, Madambakkam
S4	Medavakkam	Chromepet	Medavakkam Koot Road, Vellaikal, Kovilambakkam, Vijayalakshmi, Pattavedaman Temple, Kumaran Kundram
S5	Fort R.S	Secretariat	War Memorial
S6	Tambaram West	Vengambakkam	Tambaram East, Selaiyur, Balaji Nagar, Meppadu
S12	Velachery M.R.T.S	Guindy Race Course	Velachery Vijayanagar, Velachery Erikarai, Maduvinkarai
S13	Velachery	Guindy Race Course	Velachery M.R.T.S, A.G.S Colony, Brindavan Nagar, N.G.O Colony, Maduvinkarai
S15	Thiruvanmiyur M.R.T.S	Madhya Kailash	Tidel Park, Ascendas I.T Park, Kanagam, I.I.T Madras
S17	Adyar	Mandaveli	Gandhi Nagar, Kotturpuram M.R.T.S, Kotturpuram, Adyar Gate, Greenways Road M.R.T.S, Kamaraj Salai, Thiruvengadam
S18CT	Kilmbakkam (K.C.B.T)	Tambaram West	
S18D	Saidapet	Kilkattalai	Little Mount, Guindy, N.G.O Colony, St. Thomas Mount, Vanuvampet
S18K	M.G.R Central	Saidapet West Parsan Nagar	P.OR.R Sons, L.I.C, D.M.S, Teynampet, Nandanam, Mettupalayam
S19	Chromepet	Kilkattalai	Kumaran Kundram, Hastinapuram, Arunodayam Nagar, Pillayar Koil, Kovilambakkam, Echangadu
S20	Ashok Nagar Metro	D.L.F	Kalaignar Nagar, Nesapakkam, Ramapuram Koil
S21C	Mylapore	M.G.R Central	Royapettah, L.I.C, Dams Road, Guruvappa Street, Chintadripet, P.OR.R Sons
S22	Porur	Mangadu	Iyyappanthangal, Alamaram, Pattur
S24	Iyyappanthangal	Thiruverkadu	T.R Studio, Velappanchavadi, Perumal Nagar, Gurimedai
S24A	Kambar Colony	T.V.K.Nagar	T.R Studio, Velappanchavadi, Perumal Nagar, Gurimedai
S25	Valsaravakkam	Maduravoyal	Alapakkam, Meenakshi Dental
S25A	Iyyappanthanagl	Maduravoyal Erikari	
S26	Ashok Nagar Metro	Valsaravakkam	Indira Colony, Nesapakkam, Ramapuram, Venkateswar Nagar
S28	M.G.R Koyambedu (C.M.B.T)	Iyyappanthangal	Rohini Theatre, Maduravoyal, Porur Gardens, Porur
S30	Ashok Nagar Metro	Saidapet	Ragava Nagar, Mettuplayam Market, Saidapet Market
S30CT	Guindy G.H	K.K.Nagar	
S30K	Guindy G.H	Kotturpuram M.R.T.S	Saidapet Market, Saidapet Metro, Nandanam, Chamiers Road, Kotturpuram
S31	M.G.R Koyambedu (C.M.B.T)	Vadapalani	Koyambedu Market, Chinmaya Nagar, Amuthan Stores, Virugambakkam
S35	Ashok Nagar Metro	Defence Colony	Saidapet West, Adduthotti Bridge, Guindy I.E, Military Hospital
S36	D.M.S Metro	Nungambakkam R.S	Gemini, Sterling Road, Loyola College
S40	Pallavaram	Indira Nagar	Pallavaram Cantonment, Moovar Nagar, Cowl Bazaar
S41	Avadi	Ambedkar Statue	Kannigapuram, Ayapakkam, Ayanambakkam Church
S42	Korattur	Maduravoyal	Church Stop, Yadhava Street, Padi Sivan Koil, T S Krishna Nagar, Mookambigai Dental College, Vengaya Mandi
S43	Villivakkam	Pudur	Srinivasa Nagar, Teachers Colony, Madanankuppam, Kallikuppam
S44	Villivakkam	Perambur	Srinivasa Nagar, Poompuhar Nagar, Kolathur, Periyar Nagar, Venus
S45	Poonamallee	Avadi	Parivakkam, Mettuppalaiyam, Ayalchery, Annaikattuchery, Pattabiram, Kavarapalayam
S47	Mittanamalli G.H.S.S	Avadi	Mittanamalli, Karimedu, Kakkanji Nagar, Kavrapalayam
S47M	C.R.P.F	Avadi	Mittanamalli, Karimedu, Kakkanji Nagar, Kavrapalayam
S48	Siranjeevi	Avadi	Perumal Kovil, Kavarapalayam
S50	Poonamallee	Avadi	Parivakkam, Mettuppalaiyam, Ayalchery, V.G.V Nagar, Kamraj Nagar
S51	M.G.R Koyambedu (C.M.B.T)	Nolambur Shakthi Nagar	Rohini Theatre, Rohini Theatre, Nerkundram, Moggappair, J.J Nagar West
S52	Avadi	Thiruverkadu	Iyankulam, Paruthipattu, Ayyappan Madam
S53	Ambathur I.E	Maduravoyal	J.J Nagar West, Nolambur, Ayanambakkam, Vanagaram
S54TCT	Porur	Chembarambakkam	Iyyappanthangal, Kumanan Chavadi, Poonamallee, Nazarathpet
~~S54V (CT)~~	Poonamallee	Veppampattu	Nazarathpet, Thirumazhisai, Vellavedu, Puduchatram, Perumalpattu
S55	Ambathur R.S	Thirumullaivoyal Sidco	Ambathur O.T, Thirumullaivoyal, Thirumullaivoyal Venkatachalam Nagar, Arrikambedu, Kattur
S56	Thiruvottriyur	Manali	Wimco Nagar, Mullai Nagar, M.F.L, Manali Market
S58	Ambathur I.E	Thirumullaivoyal Colony	Ambathur Dairy, Pattaravakkam R.S, Ambathur R.S, Ambathur O.T, Saraswathi Nagar, Devi Eswari Nagar
S59	Mangadu	Thiruverkadu	Amman Nagar, Kattupakkam, Madhiravedu, Perumal Koil
S60	M.G.R Koyambedu (C.M.B.T)	Maduravoyal Erikari	Rohini Theatre, Rohini Theatre, Nerkundram, Sakthi Nagar, Nesamal Nagar, Mettukuppam
S62	Perambur	Manali	Perambur Market, Moolakadai, Kodungaiyur, Parvathi Nagar, Sekadu, Manali Market
S63	Moolakadai	Manali	Erukanchery, Sidco, Selaivayal, Balaji Palayam, Manali Market
S64	Perambur	Assisi Nagar	Perambur Market, Moolakadai, Madhavaram, Agarsen College
S66	Kundrathur	Pallavaram	Manikam Nagar, Metro Grand City, Andakuppam, Anakaputhur, Pammal
~~S68~~	Villivakkam	Madhavaram (M.M.B.T)	Srinivasa Nagar, Kolathur, Poompuhar Nagar, Peruvallur Kumaran Nagar, Kangachathiram
S69	Airport Metro	Kundrathur	Pallavaram, Pammal, Anakaputhur
S70K	Thirumangalam Metro	Korattur Water Canal	Thirumangalam, Anna Nagar West, Lucas, Korattur, Palla Street
S73	Ambathur I.E	Thiruverkadu	J.J Nagar West, Nolambur, Vanagram Salai, Manthopu, Koladi, Devi Nagar
S74	Pallavaram R.S	Kilkattalai	Alamaram, Dhargas
S75	Ambathur O.T	Lucas-TVS	Ambathur R.S, Alamaram, Menambedu, Ambathur Dairy, Korattur
S76	Thiyagaraya Nagar	St Thomas Mount M.R.T.S	Saidapet, Little Mount, Guindy, Alandur Metro
S80	Tambaram Sanatorium MEPZ	Thendral Nagar	
S81	Chromepet	Pozhichallur	Pallavaram, Pallavaram Cantonment, Pammal Iyyapan Nagar
S82	Alandur Metro	Madipakkam	Alandur Court, Nanganallur, Moovarsampet, Balaji Nagar, Puzhuthivakkam, Ponniamman Kovil
S83	Alandur Metro	Guru Nanak College	St Thomas Mount, Adambakkam, Puzhuthivakkam M.R.T.S, Velachery M.R.T.S, Velachery Vijayanagar
S84	Alandur Metro	Porur	Kathipara, Nandambakkam, Mugalivakkam
S86	Thiyagaraya Nagar	Ramapuram	Mettupalayam, Ashok Nagar, Nesapakkam
S87	M.G.R Koyambedu (C.M.B.T)	K.K.Nagar	Koyambedu Market, Chinmaya Nagar, Virugambakkam, Nesappakkam
S88A	Porur	Nandambakkam Village	Moulivakkam, Gerugambakkam, Kovur, Thandalam, Kolachery, Kundrathur, Sirukalathur
~~S93~~	Velachery	Pallikaranai	Kaiveli, Kamatchi Hospital, Kamakoti Nagar, Labour Colony
S94	Durga Nagar	Thirumudivakkam Sidco	Chromepet, Lakshmipuram, Thiruneermalai, Thirumudivakkam
S95	Velachery	Perungudi	Tharamani M.R.T.S, Kandachavadi
~~S96~~	Government Estate Metro	Secretariat	Triplicane, Anna Square
S97	Guindy Metro	Velachery Vijaya Nagar	Guindy I.E, Guindy Race Course, Checkpost
S98	Little Mount Metro	Tharamani	Gandhi Mandapam, Madhya Kailash, Tidel Park
~~S99~~	Shenoy Nagar Metro	Thiyagaraya Nagar	Arun Hotel, Nungambakkam R.S, Loyola College, Mahalingapuram
S100	Airport Metro	Tambaram East	Pallavaram, Chromepet, Puliyamaram, Tambaram Sanatorium R.S
S145	Ayanavaram	M.G.R Koyambedu (C.M.B.T)	Sayani, Ayanavaram Maternity Hospital, Veerasamy Main Road, V.O.C Nagar, Anna Nagar East Metro, Santhi Colony, Naduvankarai Bridge
S165	Pallavaram	Kovur	Pammal, Anakaputhur, Tarapakkam, Thandalam
S166	Porur	Manimedu	Moulivakkam, Gerugambakkam
S167	Pallavaram	Pattur	Pammal, Pozhichallur, Indira Nagar, Kolapakkam, Moulivakkam
S169	Moolakadai	Tollgate	M.K.B Nagar, Sidco, Kaviarasu Kannadasan Nagar, Korukkupet, V.O.C Nagar Junction, Tondiarpet
SC1	I.O.C	Tondiarpet	

=== Secretariat and Rajaji Bhavan Routes ===
These make single trips each in the Morning and Evening serving passengers for Secretariat (located at Fort St. George) or Rajaji Bhavan (located in Besant Nagar) and Rest of regular routes

Route	Origin	Destination	Via
11	Thiyagaraya Nagar	Secretariat	Pondy Bazaar, D.M.S, L.I.C, Chepauk, Anna Square
11B	Kalaignar Nagar	Broadway	Nesapakkam, Ashok Pillar, Liberty, Palmgrove, Gemini, L.I.C, P.OR.R Sons, Secretariat
11E	Kalaignar Nagar	Broadway	Nesapakkam, Ashok Pillar, Mambalam, Vani Mahal, Thousand Lights, L.I.C, P.OR.R Sons, Secretariat
13A	Kalaignar Nagar	Broadway	Bharathidasan Colony, Ashok Pillar, Mettupalayam, Thiyagaraya Nagar, Vani Mahal, Thousand Lights, Gopalapuram, Royapettah, Ice House, Triplicane, Anna Square, Secretariat
18	Broadway	Thandar Nagar	Secretariat, Anna Square, Chepauk, L.I.C, D.M.S, Teynampet, Nandanam
21G	Besant Nagar	Tambaram	Rajaji Bhavan, Adyar, Madhya Kailash, Anna University, Raj Bhavan, Little Mount, Guindy, Alandur Metro, Pallavaram, Chromepet
21Lx	Broadway	Kilkattalai	Secretariat, Marina Beach, Q.M.C, Santhome, Foreshore Estate, Adyar, Madhya Kailash, Anna University, Checkpost, Velachery, Kaiveli, Sadasivam Nagar
21M	Broadway	Kovur	Secretariat, Marina Beach, Q.M.C, Santhome, Foreshore Estate, Adyar, Madhya Kailash, Anna University, Guindy, Kathipara, Nandambakkam, Porur, Moulivakkam, Gerugambakkam
26x	Broadway	Kundrathur	Secretariat, Anna Square, Chepauk, L.I.C, Gemini, Palmgrove, Liberty, Vadapalani, Valasaravakkam, Porur, Periyapanicherry, Kolachery
29F	Secretariat	Perambur	Anna Square, Chepauk, Pudupet, Egmore, Dasaprakash, Purasaivakkam, Doveton, Otteri, Jamaliya
53x	Broadway	Sriperumbudur	Secretariat, M.G.R Central, Egmore North, Dasaprakash, K.M.C, Aminjikarai, Arumbakkam, Rohini Theatre, Maduravoyal, Velappanchavadi, Kumanan Chavadi, Poonamallee, Nazarathpet, Thirumazhisai, Chembarambakkam, Chettipedu, Irungattukottai, Karathangal
71C	Secretariat	Sidco Nagar	M.G.R Central, Egmore North, Dasaprakash, K.M.C, Kilpauk Garden, V.O.C. Nagar
78	Besant Nagar	M.G.R Koyambedu	Rajaji Bhavan, Adyar, Madhya Kailash, Anna University, Raj Bhavan, Little Mount, Guindy, Ekkattuthangal, Ashok Pillar, Vadapalani, Arumbakkam Metro
88K	Secretariat	Kundrathur	Anna Square, Chepauk, L.I.C, D.M.S, Teynampet, Nandanam, Saidapet, Little Mount, Guindy, Kathipara, Ramapuram, Porur, Periyapanicherry, Kolachery
109	Besant Nagar	Kovalam	Shastri Nagar, Adyar, Thiruvanmiyur, Palavakkam, Injambakkam, Akkarai, Uthandi, Muttukadu
142	Secretariat	Vinayagapuram	M.G.R Central, Choolai, Aragadam, Pulianthope, Vyasarpadi Jeeva, Perambur, Venus, Kolathur, Retteri
A1	Secretariat	Thiruvanmiyur	Anna Square, Chepauk, L.I.C, Royapettah, Mylapore, Mandaveli, Adyar
A51x	Broadway	Paduvanchery	Secretariat, Anna Square, Chepauk, L.I.C, D.M.S, Teynampet, Nandanam, Saidapet, Little Mount, Velachery, Pallikaranai, Medavakkam, Ponmar
A57	Broadway	Padianallur	Beach Railway Station, Vallalar Nagar, Vyasarpadi, Moolakadai, Madhavaram, Puzhal, Redhills
PP42	Secretariat	Agaram	M.G.R Central, Choolai, Aragadam, Pulianthope, Vyasarpadi Jeeva, Perambur, Venus
