= Perambur Flyover Park =

Urban Park near Perambur railway station, in Chennai, Tamil Nadu, India

- Murasoli Maran Flyover Park
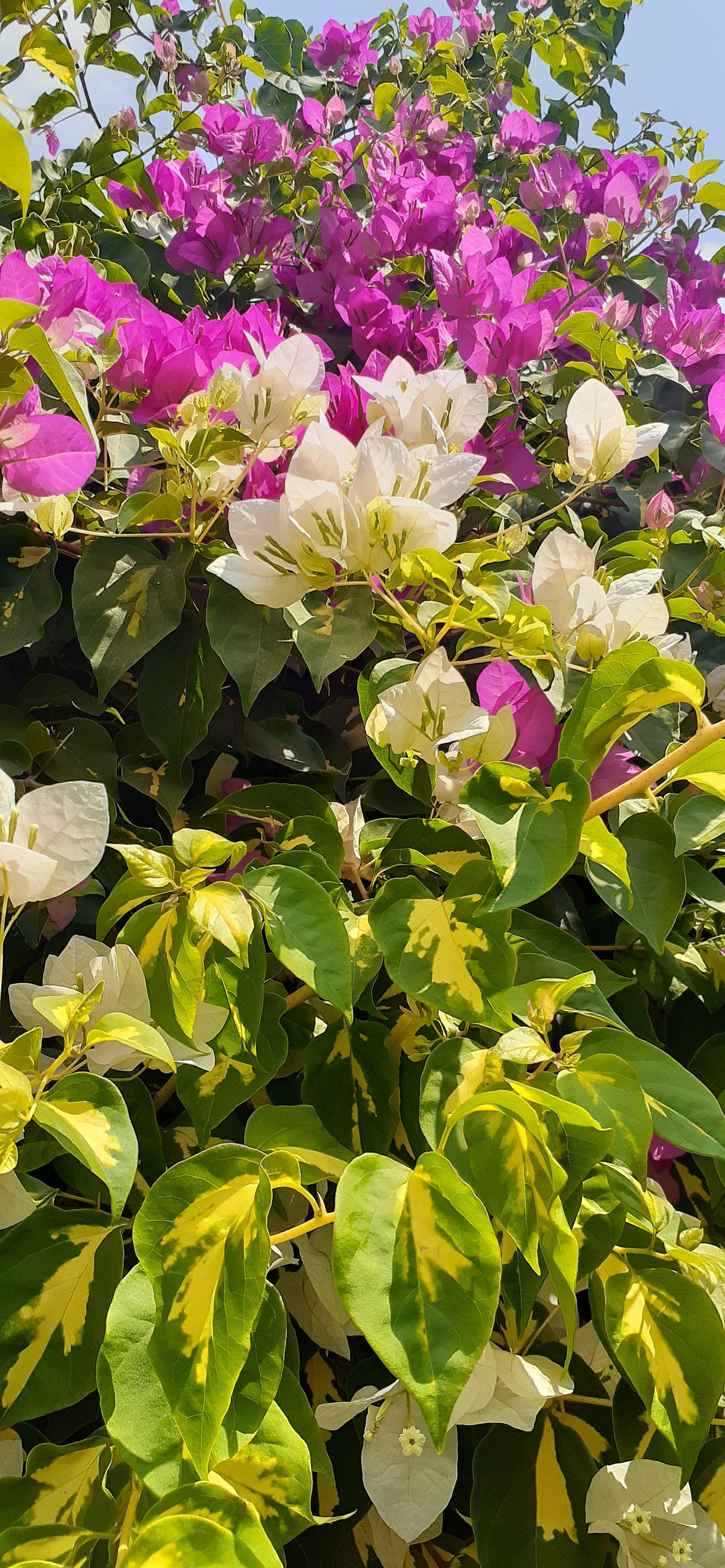
- Mind pleasing flowers on trees in Perambur Flyover Park (Murasoli Maran Flyover Park), Perambur, Chennai, Tamil Nadu.
- Interactive map of Perambur Flyover Park
- Type: Urban park
- Location: Perambur, Chennai, India
- Coordinates: 13.10888°N 80.24345°E
- Created: Recreated in 2010
- Manager: Corporation of Chennai
- Status: Open

Perambur Flyover Park (Tamil: பெரம்பூர் மேம்பாலப் பூங்கா), officially known as Murasoli Maran Flyover Park (Tamil: முரசொலி மாறன் மேம்பாலப் பூங்கா), is an urban park in the neighbourhood of Perambur, in Chennai, Tamil Nadu, India. The Chennai Corporation has started earmarking area in parks and public spaces for development of the next phase of Metro stations in various parts of the city. Greenery in the Murasoli Maran Park in Perambur, is expected to be reduced because of the second phase. Families are increasingly flocking to facilities such as the Murasoli Maran Park near Perambur flyover. For over years, the sprawling Murasoli Maran Park at Perambur was a centre of attraction, especially for the kids. The lockdown and poor maintenance have however adversely affected the footfall in the park. This is one of the biggest parks in the locality. But the local body is not taking interest in maintaining it.

== Location ==
Perambur Flyover Park is located under the Perambur Flyover in Perambur near Perambur Railway Station, at the junction of Perambur High Road, Madhavaram High Road, Paper Mills Road, Tank link Road and Perambur Tank Road.

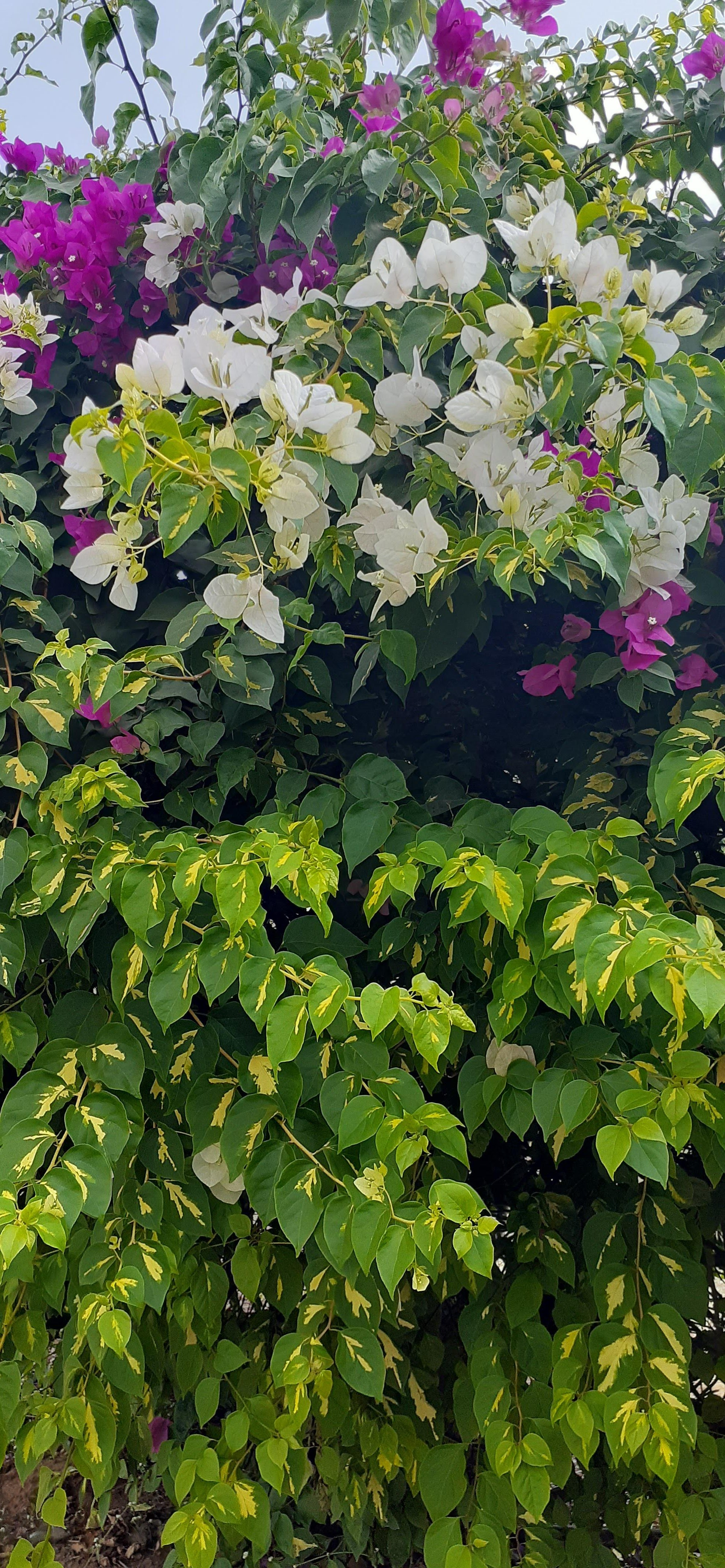
Mind pleasing flowers, Murasoli Maran Flyover Park, Perambur, Chennai, Tamil Nadu, India.

== Beneficial neighbourhoods ==
Perambur, Vyasarpadi, Sembium, Moolakadai, Agaram, Peravallur, Thiru.Vi.Ka Nagar, Jawahar Nagar, Periyar Nagar, Kolathur, Chennai, Ponniammanmedu, Kumaran Nagar, Balakumaran Nagar, Thiruppathi Nagar, Poombuhar Nagar, Balaji Nagar, Ayanavaram, Jamalia, Lakshmipuram, Vinayagapuram are some of the neighbourhoods benefited by this park.

== Nearby railway stations ==
Perambur, Perambur Carriage Works, Perambur Loco Works and Vyasarpadi Jeeva are some of the railway stations near to this park.

== The park ==
The Perambur Railway Station and Perambur High Road divide the park into two parts, one on the north side of Perambur Railway Station and the other on its south side. The northern side park is comparatively larger than the one on the southern side. The northern side park has many facilities such as yoga stage, children's play area with play equipment, junior skating podium, flowering plants, disco water theme with coloured lights, high mast tower light, concrete benches with pedestrian paths. The southern side park has a high mast tower light, concrete benches with pedestrian paths and flowering plants. The northern side park is more crowded than the southern side park. The park is crowded on weekend evenings and public holidays. It is also the first disco water park in Chennai. Clean restrooms are also provided.

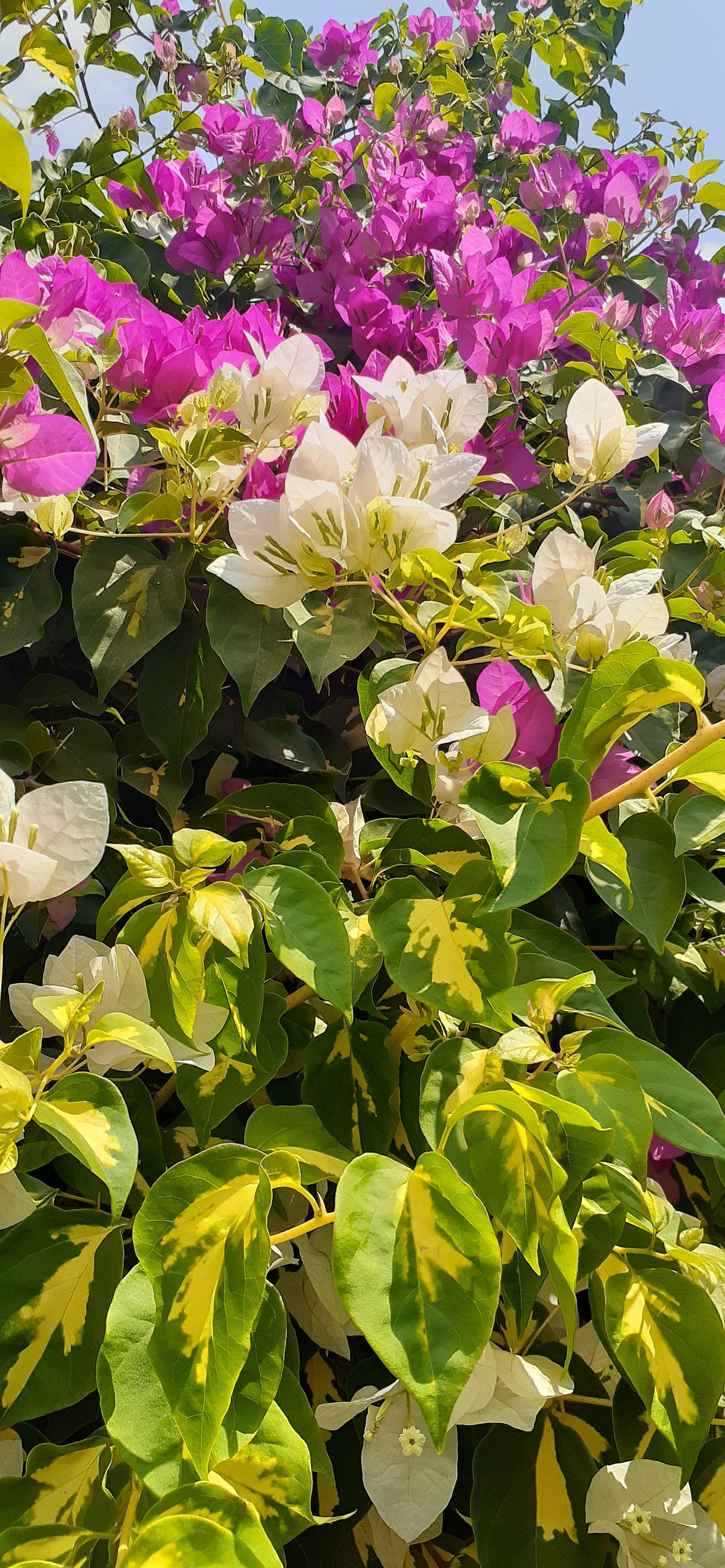
Trees with beautiful attractive flowers, Perambur Flyover Park (Murasoli Maran Flyover Park), Chennai, Tamil Nadu, India.

== Nearby attractions ==
- Spectrum Mall (Chennai)
- Our Lady of Lourdes Shrine

== See also ==
- Parks in Chennai
