= Arulmigu Kapaleeswarar Arts and Science College =

College in Tamil Nadu, India

- Type: Government College of Arts and Science
- Established: 2021
- Religious affiliation: Sri Kapaleeswarar Temple Chennai owns the college through Hindu Religious and Charitable Endowments Department, Government of Tamil Nadu
- Undergraduates: B.Com., B.B.A., B.C.A., B Sc. Computer Science
- Location: 13°07′32.1″N 80°13′12.9″E
- Campus: Everwin Vidhyashram Campus

Arulmigu Sri Kapaleeswarar Arts and Science College is a college established in the year 2021, in Kolathur neighbourhood, in Tiruvallur district of the state Tamil Nadu in the peninsular India. This is the first of its kind in Kolathur. At present, 250 students are studying here. The college is owned by the Sri Kapaleeswarar Temple Chennai and does NOT receive any funding from the Government of Tamil Nadu.

The Sri Kapaleeswarar Temple is located in Mylapore has a rich history and is thought to be over 2000 years old by some accounts and said to have had major construction done during the 7th Century Pallavas. When the Portuguese damaged the construction in the 16th century, the Vijayanagara empire reconstructed the same.

== Location ==
Located at an altitude of 34 m above the mean sea level, the geographical coordinates of Arulmigu Kapaleeswarar Arts and Science College are: 13°07'32.1"N, 80°13'12.9"E (i.e. 13.125583°N, 80.220250°E).

== Transport ==
=== Road transport ===
From the Retteri junction, a four-road intersection, that connects Chennai to various districts and states, this college is located just a km away.

=== Rail transport ===
Villivakkam railway station, Perambur railway station, Perambur Carriage Works railway station and Perambur Loco Works railway station are some of the railway stations that are nearer to this college.

=== Air transport ===
Chennai International Airport is located at about 22 km from this college.

== Beneficial neighbourhoods ==
Kolathur, Chennai, Ponniammanmedu, Lakshmipuram, Vinayagapuram, Madhavaram, Peravallur, Periyar Nagar, Jawahar Nagar, Agaram, Sembium, Thiru. Vi. Ka Nagar and Perambur are some of the neighbourhoods benefited by this college.

== Courses offered ==
This college offers undergraduate courses as follows: B.Com., B.B.A., B.C.A., and B.Sc. Computer Science. And on the idea to offer courses on religious subjects, a 6-month certificate course on B. A. Saiva Siddhantham is to be included in this college, said by the Tamil Nadu state minister of Hindu Religious and Charitable Endowments Department, Government of Tamil Nadu.

== Facilities ==
Principal and administrative room, Professor rooms, Seven class rooms, two computer laboratories, one library and toilet facilities are available in this college. This college is temporarily started at the campus of a private school viz., Everwin Vidhyashram, which is situated on Red Hills road in Kolathur neighbourhood. This will be shifted permanently to the nearby proposed buildings at the campus of 5 acre land belonging to Somanatha Swamy Temple. 9 Assistant Professors, one librarian and one physical education teacher are appointed.
