= Somanatha Swamy Temple =

Hindu temple in Chennai

- Temple location in Tamil Nadu

Religion
- Affiliation: Hinduism
- Deity: Somanatheeswarar
- Festivals: Shivratri, Amavasya, Pradosham

Location
- Location: Kolathur
- State: Tamil Nadu
- Country: India
- Interactive map of Somanatha Swamy Temple
- Coordinates: 13°07′29.5″N 80°12′53.9″E

Architecture
- Completed: 800 years ago
- Elevation: 36 m (118 ft)

Website
- hrce.tn.gov.in

Somanatha Swamy Temple is a Shaivite temple, located in Kolathur, in the state of Tamil Nadu in India. Main Deity (Moolavar) is Somanatheeswarar. Goddess is Amuthambigai. Viruksha is said to be Vilvam tree. Temple tanks are Chandra Theertham and Agni Theertham. This temple was constructed 800 years ago. It was worshipped by Sage Agasthiyar. The place where this temple is constructed, was called in ancient times as 'Thirukulandhai' and then 'Thirukkulathur' and nowadays as 'Kolathur'. Saint cum poet Madhava Sivagnanam of 'Thiruvavadudurai Adheenam' who lived in the sixteenth century wrote poems viz., 'Somesar Mudhumollhi Venbaa', 'Kulathur Pathitruppathandhathi' and 'Amuthambigai Pillaiththamillh' for the deities of this temple.

== Location ==
Located at an altitude of 36 m above the mean sea level, the geographical coordinates of Somanatha Swamy Temple are: 13°07'29.5"N, 80°12'53.9"E (i.e. 13.124850°N, 80.214980°E).

== Beneficial neighbourhoods ==
Devotees from Kolathur, Ponniammanmedu, Poompuhar Nagar, Peravallur, Agaram, Periyar Nagar, Jawahar Nagar, Thiru. Vi. Ka Nagar, Sembium, Perambur neighbourhoods visit this temple daily and perform poojas.

== Poojas and timings ==
This temple is kept open for the devotees for darshan of deities from 06.00 a.m. to 11.00 a.m. and 05.00 p.m. to 08.00 p.m. The poojas performed here are:

  - Kaalasandhi pooja from 07.00 a.m. to 07.30 a.m.
  - Saayaraksha pooja from 06.00 p.m. to 06.30 p.m.

== Temple - college ==
Under the control of Hindu Religious and Charitable Endowments Department, Government of Tamil Nadu, in a site of 5 acres belonging to this temple, it is proposed to construct a Government Arts and Science College, which was named Arulmigu Kapaleeswarar Arts and Science College and started temporarily at the campus of Everwin Matriculation Higher Secondary School, in Kolathur, in the year 2021, the college being enrolled by 210 students. Nine Assistant Professors, one librarian and one physical education teacher are appointed for this college. Apart from the undergraduate courses in B.Com., B.B.A., B.C.A., and B.Sc. Computer Science, a six-month certificate course in B.A. Saiva Siddhantham, a religious subject of study, is to be included to be offered in this college.
