= General Kumaramangalam Colony =

General Kumaramangalam Colony ஜெனரல் குமாரமங்கலம் காலனி G.K.M. Colony, Butt Medu
- Sub-Neighbourhood
- Location within Chennai Location within Tamil Nadu Location within India
- Coordinates: 13.112291°N 80.219447°E
- Country: India
- State: Tamil Nadu
- District: Chennai
- Metro: Chennai

Government
  - Type: Chennai corporation.
- Elevation: 5 m (16 ft)

Languages
  - Official: Tamil
- Time zone: UTC+5:30 (IST)
- PIN: 600082
- Telephone code: 044
- Planning agency: CMDA
- City: Chennai
- Lok Sabha constituency: North Chennai
- Vidhan Sabha constituency: Kolathur
- Civic agency: Chennai Corporation

General Kumaramangalam Colony (also known as G.K.M. Colony or Butt Medu) is a sub-neighbourhood of Perambur, Chennai in Tamil Nadu state, India. It was initially created as a residential area for ex-military personnel and is named after Paramasiva Prabhakar Kumaramangalam, a former Indian Army Chief of Staff.

== Location ==
G.K.M. Colony goes from the end of the right side of Perambur Loco Works railway station to the Villivakkam railway station, and forms a part of the newly created constituency of Kolathur.

The neighbourhood is also known as Butt Medu because there used to be a small hill there made of mud, which the army used to practice shooting. However, once the military camps were removed in the early 1970s, the mud hill was flattened and a new residential area was developed, leading to a few small commercial establishments emerging in the years since.

G.K.M. Colony is near Villivakkam, Kolathur (Chennai), Periyar Nagar, Peravallur, Jawahar Nagar, Agaram (Chennai), Thiru. Vi. Ka. Nagar, Sembium, Perambur, and Ayanavaram.

== Transport ==
Public road transport is not well developed and the community depends on bus services from either Villivakkam, I.C.F., or Periyar Nagar bus terminuses. Other nearby bus terminuses include those at Thiru.Vi.Ka. Nagar and Perambur.

There are railway stations in G.K.M. Colony or nearby at Perambur Loco Works, Villivakkamn, Perambur Carriage Works, and Perambur.

== Facilities ==
A small pond between Street 9 and Street 10 and a large pond between Street 24 and Street 25 provide water for the residents.

G.K.M. Colony has two Chennai Schools and some government run Kindergartens (balvadis), as well as a public hospital nearby.

== Worshipping places ==
There are temples, churches, mosques, and many Catholic grottos in G.K.M. Colony.

Of particular note, there is a temple for the former Chief Minister of Tamil Nadu, Dr. M. G. Ramachandran, reputedly the first temple for an actor in Tamil Nadu.
