= ICF Colony =

Neighbourhood in Chennai, Tamil Nadu, India

- Neighbourhood
- ICF Colony, Ayanavaram, Chennai, Tamil Nadu
- Coordinates: 13.0980°N 80.2195°E
- Country: India
- State: Tamil Nadu
- District: Chennai
- Elevation: 32.71 m (107.3 ft)

Languages
  - Official: Tamil, English
  - Speech: Tamil, English
- Time zone: UTC+5:30 (IST)
- PIN: 600038
- Telephone code: +9144xxxxxxxx
- Other Neighbourhoods: Ayanavaram, Villivakkam, Perambur, Jamalia, Kellys, Kilpauk, Padi, Anna Nagar, Periyar Nagar, Agaram, Peravallur, Jawahar Nagar, Sembium
- Corporation: Greater Chennai Corporation
- LS: Chennai Central
- VS: Villivakkam

ICF Colony is a locality in Ayanavaram neighbourhood in Chennai, Tamil Nadu, India, where the Integral Coach Factory, (ICF) is located. The area also consists of a bus depot and the ICF Hospital. The locality has an MTC bus depot connecting the locality to areas such as Thiruvanmiyur.

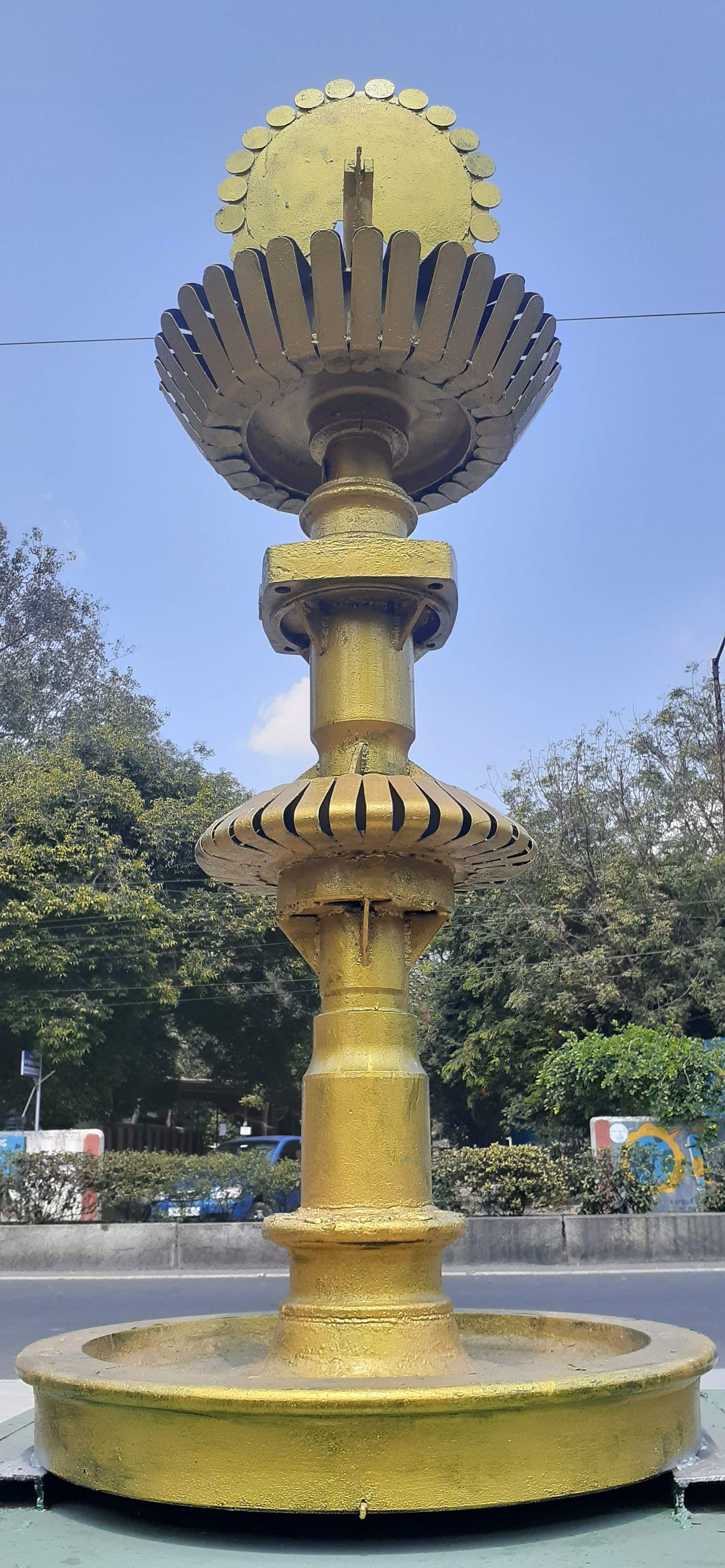
Sculptured metal Lamp, on the ecozone, Ayanavaram road, ICF Colony, Chennai, Tamil Nadu, India.

== Neighborhoods ==
Some of the neighbourhoods to ICF Colony are Ayanavaram, Villivakkam, Anna Nagar, Perambur, Padi, Kellys, Kilpauk, Jamalia, Periyar Nagar, Agaram, Peravallur, Jawahar Nagar and Sembium.

== Sub-neighbourhoods ==
ICF East colony, ICF West colony, ICF North colony, ICF South colony are some of the subneighbourhoods to ICF Colony.

== Connectivity ==
The main roads that connect to ICF Colony are Chennai - Tiruvallur High road (CTH road), Ayanavaram road (Konnur High road) and New Avadi road.

=== Road transport ===
Metropolitan Transport Corporation operates a lot of buses that ply to different parts of Chennai via. ICF Colony. The various parts of connectivity include: Koyambedu, Parry's corner, Broadway, Ambattur, Tiruninravur, Avadi, Adyar, Vadapalani, Madhavaram, Moolakadai, Chennai Egmore railway station, Puratchi Thalaivar Dr. M. G. Ramachandran Central railway station, Anna square, Marina beach, Elliott's beach.

Owing to the availability of a bus terminal here, the area is always busy.

=== Rail transport ===
Nearby railway stations include Perambur Loco Works railway station, Perambur Carriage Works railway station, Perambur railway station and Villivakkam railway station.

ICF Colony is also well connected to Puratchi Thalaivar Dr. M. G. Ramachandran Central railway station and Chennai Egmore railway station by both rail and road transports.

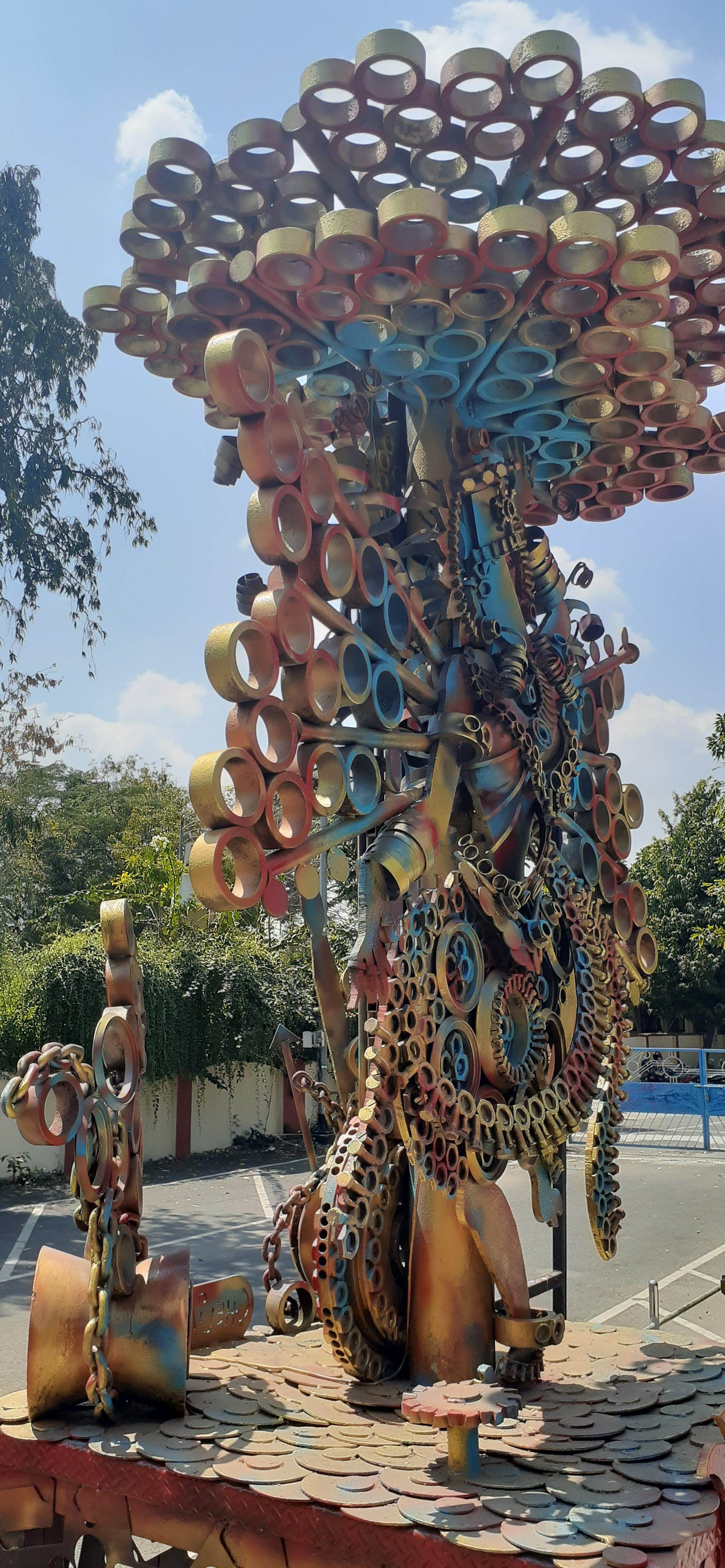
Sculptured metal craft, on the ecozone, Ayanavaram road, ICF Colony, Chennai, Tamil Nadu, India.

== Education ==
Educational institutions viz., ICF Higher Secondary School, ICF Silver Jubilee Matriculation Higher Secondary School and ICF Vidyaniketan (CBSE affiliation) are situated in ICF Colony.
