= Kavankarai =

- Neighbourhood
- Kavankarai (Chennai)
- Coordinates: 13°10′13.8″N 80°11′43.4″E
- Country: India
- State: Tamil Nadu
- District: Chennai district
- Elevation: 38 m (125 ft)

Languages
  - Official: Tamil, English
  - Speech: Tamil, English
- Time zone: UTC+5:30 (IST)
- PIN: 600066
- Telephone Code: +9144xxxxxxxx
- Neighbourhoods: Red Hills, Pulhal, Vinayagapuram, Kallikuppam, Padianallur, Cholavaram, Karanodai, Madhavaram, Lakshmipuram and Kolathur
- LS: Tiruvallur Lok Sabha constituency
- VS: Madavaram Assembly constituency
- MP: K. Jeyakumar
- MLA: S. Sudharsanam
- Website: https://chennaicorporation.gov.in

Kavankarai is a neighbourhood near Pulhal in Chennai district of Tamil Nadu state in the peninsular India. It is located at an altitude of about 30 m above the mean sea level with the geographical coordinates of 13°10′13.8″N 80°11′43.4″E (i.e., 13.170500°N, 80.195400°E). Red Hills, Pulhal, Vinayagapuram, Kallikuppam, Padianallur, Cholavaram, Karanodai, Madhavaram, Lakshmipuram and Kolathur are some of the important neighbourhoods of Kavankarai. Kannappa Swamigal was a spiritualist who lived in Kavankarai.
