= Vinayagapuram =

Neighbourhood in Chennai district, Tamil Nadu, India

- Chennai city
- Location within Chennai
- Coordinates: 13.14°N 80.20°E
- Country: India
- State: Tamil Nadu
- District: Chennai district
- Metro: Chennai
- Zone: Madhavaram Zone No 3
- Division: Tondiarpet

Government
  - Body: Chennai Corporation
- Elevation: 13 m (43 ft)

Languages
  - Official: Tamil
- Time zone: UTC+5:30 (IST)
- PIN: 600099
- Vehicle registration: TN-05-xxxx
- Lok Sabha constituency: North Chennai
- Vidhan Sabha constituency: Madhavaram
- Civic agency: Greater Chennai Corporation

Vinayagapuram is a residential neighbourhood in north Chennai city's Chennai district. It's located in the Indian state of Tamil Nadu.

Neighbourhoods close to Vinayagapuram are Perambur, Anna Nagar, Villivakkam, Puzhal, Jawahar Nagar, Thiru-vi-ka Nagar, Senthil Nagar, Madhavaram and Periyar Nagar.

== Location and surroundings ==
Vinayagapuram is a suburban residential area near Puzhal, Tamil Nadu. It is located just 1 km away from Retteri junction in Kolathur, Chennai. The area's main commuting route is a ring road near Lucas TVS junction, which connects the suburb to Padi, New Avadi road, Ayanavaram High Road, Anna Nagar, and Puzhal.

Vinayagapuram was attached to the Chennai Corporation in 2011, aiding in its development. The neighbourhoods of Vinayagapuram consist of Anna Nagar, Villivakkam, Puzhal, Retteri junction, Kolathur, Jawahar Nagar, Lakshmipuram, TVK Nagar, Senthil Nagar, Perambur, Puthagaram, Madhavaram, Surapet, and Periyar Nagar. It is close to the Grand North Trunk (GNT) road, which connects to Grand South trunk (GST) road.

== Transportation ==
The Metropolitan Transport Corporation (MTC) operates passenger buses to Vinayagapuram from other major parts of the city. The government has allotted a place for a bus terminal near the Vinayagapuram bus stand. The bus routes operated are 142 to Perambur and 29 ext to Mandaveli. These small buses ply between Vinayagapuram to Villivakkam. Share autorickshaws play an important role in transportation, as there is no railway line passing through Vinayagapuram.

== Educational institutions ==
- Velammal Engineering College, Surapet
- King's Matriculation School, Kalpalayam
- Infant Jesus Matriculation School, near ECI church
- Everwin School
- Velammal School Surapet
- Veera Savarkar School
- Godson School
- Soka Ikeda Arts & Science College
- Municipal higher secondary school (Lakshmi puram)

=== Churches ===
- Church of New Life in Jesus (CSI)
- ECI church
- Zion Garden AG Church

=== Places ===
- Sri Kumaran Nagar
- S.B.O.A. teachers colony
- Saraswathy Nagar

=== Landmarks nearby ===
- DRJ Hospital
- Rettai Eri

== See also ==
- Chennai Airport
- Chennai Central
- Chennai Suburban Railway
- Chennai district
