= Venus, Chennai =

Venus வீனஸ்
- Neighbourhood
- Location within Chennai Location within Tamil Nadu Location within India
- Coordinates: 13.11302°N 80.23638°E
- Country: India
- State: Tamil Nadu
- District: Chennai
- Metro: Chennai
- Elevation: 8 m (26 ft)

Languages
  - Official: Tamil
- Time zone: UTC+5:30 (IST)
- PIN: 600011
- Telephone code: 044
- Planning agency: CMDA
- City: Chennai
- Lok Sabha constituency: North Chennai
- Vidhan Sabha constituency: Kolathur
- Civic agency: Greater Chennai Corporation

Venus (Tamil: வீனஸ்), is a small neighbourhood of Perambur and a commercial area in North Chennai, a metropolitan city in Tamil Nadu, India. The small area around erstwhile Venus Theatre is called Venus unofficially by the people around Perambur. The erstwhile Venus theatre was demolished and a new mall namely Spectrum Mall was constructed, which has a five screen PVR multiplex. The mall was developed and promoted by Ganga Foundations.

== Location ==
Venus is located near Agaram, Peravallur and Perambur. It is well connected by train and bus transport. It is very close to Perambur and Perambur Carriage Works Railway Stations.
