= Sembium =

Sembium Sembiam, Sembiyam
- Neighbourhood
- Location within Chennai Location within Tamil Nadu Location within India
- Coordinates: 13°07′29.8″N 80°14′20.7″E
- Country: India
- State: Tamil Nadu
- District: Chennai
- Metro: Chennai
- Elevation: 9 m (30 ft)

Languages
  - Official: Tamil
- Time zone: UTC+5:30 (IST)
- PIN: 600011, 600082
- Telephone code: 044
- Vehicle registration: TN-05
- Planning agency: CMDA
- City: Chennai
- Lok Sabha constituency: Chennai North (Lok Sabha constituency)
- Vidhan Sabha constituency: Kolathur (state assembly constituency)
- Civic agency: Chennai Corporation

Sembium is a neighbourhood in Chennai, near to Perambur and a developed residential area in North Chennai, a metropolitan city in Tamil Nadu, India, located at an altitude of 9 m above mean sea level. Sembium was a municipality (Sembium-Ayanavaram municipality) until it was annexed by Chennai.

== Location ==
Sembium is located near Moolakadai, Perambur, Thiru. Vi. Ka. Nagar, (Kolathur, Chennai), Agaram, Peravallur, Jawahar Nagar, Ayanavaram, Periyar Nagar, Vyasarpadi, Erukkancheri, Kodungaiyur, Madhavaram and Ponniammanmedu. It is well connected by train and bus transports. It is very close to Perambur railway station, Perambur Carriage Works railway station and Moolakadai Junction.

== Demographics ==
As per Census of India 2011, the total population of Sembium was 46,250. Out of this, the male population contributed 22,896 whereas the female population was 23,354. Out of this, 5,471 (males: 2,661 and females: 2,810) were Scheduled Castes and 139 (males: 74 and females: 65) were Scheduled Tribes. The population of children below 6 years of age was 4,779 (males: 2,454 and females: 2,325). Literates of Sembium constituted 37,254 (males: 19.232 and females: 18,022).

== History ==
Along with Avadi, Ambattur, Ennore and Tiruvottriyur, Sembium is part of the "auto belt" in the city's industrial north and west regions that developed when the automobile industry developed in Madras, in the early post-World War II years.

== Transportation ==
=== Road transport ===
Sembium is well connected to Chennai and other places of Chennai and other nearby district viz., Thiruvallur district, and state namely Andhra Pradesh by Road transport by buses operated by Metropolitan Transport Corporation, Chennai and State Express Transport Corporation. Some important roads and streets include off - Paper Mills Road, off - SRP koil (north) street, Teeds garden streets, Mohammadian street, Kamaraj street, Ayyaavu street, Ottravadai street, Prakasam street, etc.

=== Rail transport ===
Sembium is served by Perambur Carriage Works railway station, Perambur Loco Works railway station, and Perambur railway station.

== Entertainment ==
=== Cinemas ===
S2 Cinemas (multiplex theatre attached to Spectrum Mall (Grand Venus Mall)) in Sembium area and Iyyappa Theatre, Shanmuga Theatre and Pandian Theatres are nearby.

=== Parks ===
Chennai Corporation (KKR) Park, Venus Park (on Paper Mills road, Gopal colony), for children's playing, adults morning/evening walks. Murasoli Maran Flyover Parks (Perambur Flyover Parks), which are located in Perambur just a km away, attract a huge number of children and people of all ages. The parks are equipped with a considerable number of provisions for playing, exercises, area for walking and so on.

=== Skating podium ===
A junior skating podium inside the Murasoli Maran Flyover Park, serves many children who are enthusiastic for skating.
