= Kaviyarasu Kannadhasan Nagar =

KKD Nagar
- Sub Neighbourhood
- Location within Chennai
- Coordinates: 13.133610°N 80.256529°E
- Country: India
- State: Tamil Nadu
- District: Chennai
- Locality: Kodungaiyur
- Metro: Chennai
- Founder: Dhandapani
- Elevation: 30 m (98 ft)

Languages
  - Official: Tamil
- Time zone: UTC+5:30 (IST)
- PIN: 600118
- Telephone code: 044
- Planning agency: CMDA
- City: Chennai
- Lok Sabha constituency: North Chennai
- Vidhan Sabha constituency: Perambur
- Civic agency: Chennai Corporation

KKD Nagar, also known as Kaviyarasu Kannadasan Nagar, named after the Tamil poet Kannadasan, is mainly a sub-residential locality of Kodungaiyur in the northern part of the metropolitan city of Chennai, Tamil Nadu state, India.

== Location ==
KKD Nagar is located in North Chennai. National Highway 5 (NH 5) borders this area in south. It is 8 km from Chennai Central Railway Station. This place is near to the Grand Northern Trunk [GNT] road

== Transport services ==
The bus services from/via Kaviarasu Kannadasan Nagar (KKD Nagar) bus terminal are:

Normal	Express	Deluxe

Route No	Origin	Destination	Via	Status	Fare
2A	KKD Nagar	Anna Square	Sidco, EB, MKB Nagar, Vyasarpadi, Walltax Road, Central Railway Station, Simpson(P.R.R & Sons), Bells Road, Chepauk, Triplicane, Presidency College, Marina Beach.	Running	Normal
2A	KKD Nagar	Anna Square	Sidco, EB, MKB Nagar, Vyasarpadi, Walltax Road, Central Railway Station, Simpson(P.R.R & Sons), Bells Road, Chepauk, Triplicane, Presidency College, Marina Beach.	Running	Deluxe
64K	KKD Nagar	Broadway	MR Nagar, Moolakadai, Perambur, Doveton, Vepery, Periamet, Central Station	Running	Normal
64K	KKD Nagar	Broadway	MR Nagar, Moolakadai, Perambur, Doveton, Vepery, Periamet, Central Station	Running	Deluxe
~~64K~~	KKD Nagar	Perambur	M.R Nagar, Erukkancherry, Moolakadai, Don Bosco, LakshmiAmman Temple, BB Road	Running	Normal
33B	KKD Nagar	Broadway	MKB Nagar, Vallalar Nagar(Mint), Stanley Hospital, Bharathi Women's College, Broadway Theatre, Mannadi	Running	Normal
33C	KKD Nagar	Broadway	MKB Nagar, Vallalar Nagar, Stanley Hospital, Beach RS	Running	Normal
33C	KKD Nagar	Broadway	MKB Nagar, Vallalar Nagar, Stanley Hospital, Beach RS	Running	Deluxe
37E	KKD Nagar	Iyyappanthangal	M.R.Nagar, Sharma Nagar, Ambedkar College, G3, Pattalam, Doveton, Egmore, DPI, Sterling Road, Valluvar Kottam, Vadapalani, Valasaravakkam, Porur	Running	Express
S63	Moolakadai	Manali	MR Nagar, KKD Nagar, Selaivayal, Balaji Palayalam, Chinna Sekadu, Manali Market	Running	Express
121G	KKD Nagar	CMBT	M.R.Nagar, Erukkancherry, Moolakadai, Retteri, Lucas TVS, Anna Nagar, Thirumangalam, CPWD towers	Running	Normal
121G	KKD Nagar	CMBT	MR Nagar, Moolakadai, Retteri, Wheels India, Thirumangalam CPWD towers	Running	Deluxe
121H	Kaviyarasu Kannadasan Nagar	Tambaram	Chinnandi Madam, Erukkanchery signal, Moolakadai, MMBT, Retteri Junction, Wheels India, Thirumangalam, CPWD towers, CMBT, Vadapalani, Guindy IE, St.Thomas Mount, Thirusulam Airport, Pallavaram Market, Chromepet, Tambaram Sanatorium, kadaperi	Running	Deluxe
121Hx	KKD Nagar	Kilambakkam KCBT	Chinnandi Madam, Erukkanchery signal, Moolakadai, MMBT, Retteri Junction, Wheels India, Thirumangalam, CPWD Towers, CMBT, Vadapalani, Guindy IE, St.Thomas Mount, Thirusulam Airport, Pallavaram Market, Chromepet, Tambaram Sanatorium, Tambaram West, Perungalathur, Vandaloor Zoo	Running	Deluxe
104H	KKD Nagar	Kilambakkam KCBT	Chinnandi Madam, Erukkanchery signal, Moolakadai, MMBT, Retteri Junction, Wheels India, Ambattur IE, Maduravoyal, Porur Tollplaza, Perungalathur, Vandaloor Zoo	Running	Deluxe
64Kx	Kodungaiyur Parvathi Nagar	Broadway	KKD Nagar, Chinnandi Madam, Erukkanchery signal, Moolakadai, Perambur Market, Vyasarpadi Jeeva, Pulianthope PS, Vepery, Periyamedu, MGR Chennai Central, Nurse Quarters	Running	Normal
33L	Kodungaiyur Parvathi Nagar	Broadway	KKD Nagar, Vyasarpadi Sidco, MKB Nagar East, Ramalingapuram Toll, Vallalar Nagar, Stanley Hospital, Beach RS	Running	Normal

Kodungaiyur P6 Police Station and Electricity board office is situated on Sidco Main Road.

== Schools and colleges ==
KKD Nagar and its surrounding has a number of educational institutions catering to the residents of the area. Most notable ones are

- Sree Muthukumaraswamy College, Muthamizh Nagar Church
- Thiruthangal Nadar College, Selavayal
- Dr. Ambedkar Government Arts and Science College, Vyasarpadi
- Sacred Heart Matriculation Higher Secondary School, Muthamizh Nagar
- St.Joseph's Matriculation Higher Secondary School, Seetharam Nagar
- Government High school, in K.K.D Nagar
- Don Bosco Matriculation Higher secondary school, KKD Nagar, Erukkancherry, MKB Nagar
- Sri Sayee Vivekananda Higher Secondary School, Muthamil Nagar
- Gurumoorthy High school
- FES Matriculation Higher secondary school, Muthamil Nagar
- Our Lady's Matriculation Higher Secondary School, M.R Nagar
- Velankani Matriculation Higher Secondary School, Muthamil Nagar
- Smt. N.D.J.A Vivekananda vidyalaya junior college (CBSC)
- Lakshmi Narayana Matriculation school, Selavayal
- Bharathi Nursery & Primary School, Block V, KKD Nagar
- Mother Therasa Matriculation Higher Secondary School, KKD Nagar
- Bharathi Nursery & Primary School, Block I, Muthamil Nagar
- CSI Bain Matriculation Higher Secondary School, Muthamil Nagar
- Radha Krishnan Matriculation Higher secondary school, Krishnamoorthy Nagar

== Community halls ==
Community halls located in KKD Nagar include:

- Seetha Ram Nagar Telugu People Welfare Association, Seetha Ram Nagar
- Malaysia Mahal, Ethirajsamy salai, M.R. Nagar
- A.B.Maaligai, Chinna kodungaiyur
- Malathy Mahal, Muthamil Nagar
- Eswari Mahal, Erukkancherry
- Raj Hall, Sidco Main Road. KKD Nagar
- Dana Bhackiyam Hall, Meenambal Salai, Vivekananda Nagar
- S.K Mahal, Meenambal Salai, Vivekananda Nagar
- Balaji Kalyana Mandapam, Kodungaiyur
- Burma Mahal, Thiruthangal college Road, Selavayal
- Indira Mahal, Ethirajsamy salai, M.R. Nagar
- K.S. Mahal, M.R. Nagar
- G.R Kalyana Mandapam, Kodungaiyur
- R R Mahal, Muthamil Nagar
- S.M Mahal, M.R.Nagar
