= Lakshmipuram, Chennai =

Lakshmipuram
- Neighbourhood
- Lakshmipuram (Chennai) Lakshmipuram (Tamil Nadu) Lakshmipuram (India)
- Coordinates: 13°08′10.0″N 80°12′01.8″E
- Country: India
- State: Tamil Nadu
- District: Chennai
- Metro: Chennai
- Elevation: 34 m (112 ft)

Languages
  - Official: Tamil
- Time zone: UTC+5:30 (IST)
- PIN: 600099
- Telephone code: 044
- Planning agency: CMDA
- City: Chennai
- Lok Sabha constituency: Tiruvallur
- Vidhan Sabha constituency: Madhavaram
- Civic agency: Greater Chennai Corporation

Lakshmipuram is mainly a residential locality in the northern part of the metropolitan city of Chennai, Tamil Nadu state, India.

== Location ==
Lakshmipuram is located near Retteri junction, Kolathur, Chennai.

- There is a vegetable market and also a fish market is available near Retteri junction.

== Neighborhoods ==
- Vinayagapuram
- Surapet
- Puthagaram
- Senthil Nagar
- Kolathur
- Puzhal
- Kathirvedu

== Sub-neighborhoods ==
- Kalpalayam
- Thirumaal Nagar
- Padmaavathi Nagar
- Saarathy Nagar
- Singaaravelavan Nagar
- Saptagiri Nagar
- Sakthi Nagar
- Venkateshwaraa Nagar

== Hospitals ==
- Sri Kumaran Hospital
- Maya Nursing Home
