= Perambur (disambiguation) =

Perambur is a neighbourhood in the northern region of Chennai, Tamil Nadu, India.

Perambur may also refer to these related to the Chennai neighbourhood:

- Perambur taluk, subdistrict of Chennai
- Perambur (state assembly constituency)
- Perambur railway station
- Perambur Carriage Works railway station
- Perambur Loco Works railway station
- Southern Railway Headquarters, Chennai
  - Perambur railway hospital or Southern Railway Headquarters Hospital
- Perambur Flyover Park
- Perambur Venkatesa Perumal Temple, a Hindu temple dedicated to Perumal (Vishnu)
