= ICF Lake (Chennai) =

Reservoir in Tamil Nadu, India

- Location within Chennai
- Location: ICF Colony, Villivakkam, Chennai, Tamil Nadu, India
- Coordinates: 13°06′12″N 80°13′03″E
- Type: Reservoir
- Basin countries: India
- Max. length: 450 m (1,480 ft)
- Max. width: 270 m (890 ft)
- Average depth: 7 m (23 ft)
- Settlements: Chennai

ICF Lake, or ICF Aeri, is a rain-fed reservoir located at Villivakkam and Ayanavaram areas of Chennai, India, reaching its peak levels during the monsoon seasons.

== History ==
The lake had been used as a source of drinking water in the region since the 1930s, when the reservoir was constructed. Till the 1950s, the reservoir was treated through a filtration unit and supplied as drinking water. From the 1950s, the reservoir began to get polluted due to mixing with oil waste and later by linking stormwater drain from the Villivakkam area, and drinking water supply was discontinued. In 2017, the ICF conducted surveys and renovated the lake at a cost of ₹ 10 million by removing sludge using dredgers, introducing new fish varieties, and building walking track around the lake.

== The lake ==
The lake measures 450 meters in length, 270 meters in width, and is 7 meters deep. Seven infiltration wells have been sunk on the lake bed. The pathway around the lake measures 3 kilometers.

== The future ==
The ICF has planned to build a greenhouse, covering 15,000 square feet, at a cost of ₹7.5 million. It will have four chambers housing herbal, flower, ornamental, and indoor plants.

== See also ==
- Water management in Chennai
