= Thiru. Vi. Ka. Nagar =

- Neighbourhood
- Thiru. Vi. Ka. Nagar (Chennai) Thiru. Vi. Ka. Nagar (Tamil Nadu) Thiru. Vi. Ka. Nagar (India)
- Coordinates: 13.1199°N 80.2342°E
- Country: India
- State: Tamil Nadu
- District: Chennai
- Taluk: Perambur
- Metro: Chennai
- Elevation: 31.29 m (102.7 ft)

Languages
  - Official: Tamil
- Time zone: UTC+5:30 (IST)
- PIN: 600011
- Telephone code: 044-2671****, 044-2558****
- Planning agency: CMDA
- City: Chennai
- Lok Sabha constituency: North Chennai
- Vidhan Sabha constituency: Kolathur
- Civic agency: Greater Chennai Corporation

Thiru. Vi. Ka. Nagar or TVK Nagar or Thiru. V. Kalyaanasundaram Nagar, named after the Tamil scholar Thiru. V. Kalyanasundaram, is a developed residential area in North Chennai, a metropolitan city in Tamil Nadu, India.

== Location ==
Thiru. Vi. Ka. Nagar is located with the coordinates of (13.1199°N 80.2342°E) in Chennai.

Thiru. Vi. Ka. Nagar (Chennai)

The neighbouring places of Thiru. Vi. Ka. Nagar are as follows: Peravallur (0.5 km), Agaram (0.8 km), Sembium (1 km), Periyar Nagar (2 km), Kolathur (2 km), Moolakadai (2 km), Kodungaiyur (3 km), Ponniammanmedu (3 km), Vyasarpadi (4 km), Madhavaram (5 km), Madhavaram Milk Colony (5 km), Vinayagapuram (5 km), Doveton (5 km), Purasaiwalkam (5 km), Vepery (5.5 km), Mathur MMDA (6 km), Manali (7 km), Puratchi Thalaivar Dr. M.G. Ramachandran Central railway station (8 km), Red Hills (11 km), Chennai Egmore railway station (9 km) and Broadway Bus Terminus (10 km).

== Constituency ==
Thiru. Vi. Ka. Nagar is located within the new Kolathur Constituency created after the delimitation of constituencies in 2008. Another constituency named after Thiru. Vi. Ka. Nagar is Thiru. Vi. Ka. Nagar Constituency which is also created after the delimitation of constituencies in 2008. Thiru. Vi. Ka. Nagar is not represented in Thiru. Vi. Ka. Nagar Constituency which represents the areas of Perambur(part), Ayanavaram, Otteri, Pattalam, Pulianthope.

== Greater Chennai Corporation Zone ==
Thiru. Vi. Ka. Nagar is also a zone in the Greater Chennai Corporation. It is one of the 15 zones of the Greater Chennai Corporation in which, it contains wards 64 to 78. It is named as the 6th Zone of the Greater Chennai Corporation in Central Chennai Region.

== Entertainment ==
Thiru. Vi. Ka. Nagar has a wide range of entertainment venues such as cinemas and parks nearby. Perambur has the first shopping mall of the north Chennai Spectrum Mall. It also consists of a 5 screen Multiplex named S2 Cinemas which is controlled by theater franchise SPI Cinemas. Other nearby theatres are Sri Brinda Theatre (Perambur), Ganga Cinemas (Kolathur), Sri Shanmuga Cinemas (Moolakadai), Pandian Theatre (Kodungaiyur), Iyyapa Theatre (Erukkancherry). Perambur has also got Chennai's first Disco Water park named Murasoli Maran Flyover Park which is always crowded in the weekends.

== Transportation ==
=== Railways ===
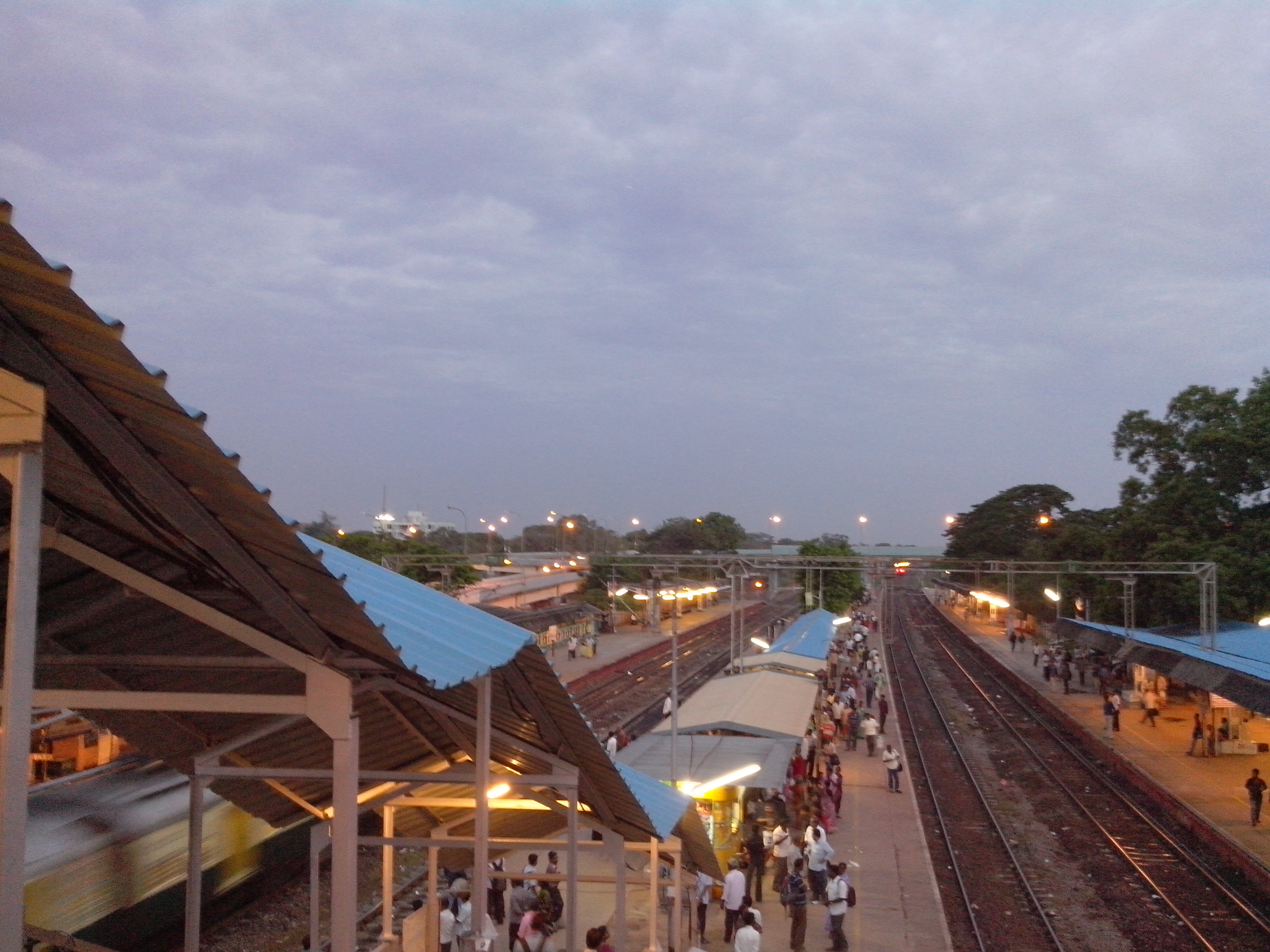
Perambur Railway Station with view of Perambur Fly over

Perambur is served by three railway stations. They are Perambur, Perambur Carriage Works and Perambur Loco Works. Thiru. Vi. Ka. Nagar can be easily accessed from any of the three stations.

=== MTC Buses ===
MTC has a bus terminus in Thiru. Vi. Ka. Nagar. The bus terminus is located on Sundararaja Perumal Koil street (North) amidst Thiru. Vi. Ka. Nagar. Ayanavaram, Perambur, Madhavaram, Alandur depots of MTC operate buses to Thiru. Vi. Ka. Nagar.

== Sub-neighbourhoods ==
Gandhi Nagar, Anbazhagan Nagar, Ramamurthy Colony, Vetri Nagar, Kennedy Square, Gopalapuram and Krishna Nagar are some of the important sub-neighbourhoods of Thiru. Vi. Ka. Nagar.

== Roads and Streets ==
Pallavan salai, SRP koil street (North) and Bashyam street are some of the important roads and streets of Thiru. Vi. Ka. Nagar.
