= Erukkanchery =

Erukkanchery எருக்கஞ்சேரி Erukkancheri, Erukencherry among others.
- Neighbourhood
- Erukkanchery (Chennai) Erukkanchery (Tamil Nadu) Erukkanchery (India)
- Coordinates: 13°07′39.7″N 80°14′54.2″E
- Country: India
- State: Tamil Nadu
- District: Chennai
- Metro: Chennai
- Named after: Tamil Nadu Government

Government
  - Type: Mayor-Civic Agency run as a Metropolitan body under elected government(s).
  - Body: Greater Chennai Corporation
- Elevation: 31 m (102 ft)

Languages
  - Official: Tamil, English
- Time zone: UTC+5:30 (IST)
- PIN: 600118
- Telephone code: 044
- Vehicle registration: TN 05
- Planning agency: CMDA
- City: Chennai
- Lok Sabha constituency: North Chennai
- Vidhan Sabha constituency: Perambur
- Civic agency: Greater Chennai Corporation

Erukkanchery or Erukkancheri, is a neighbourhood and a developed residential area in North Chennai, a metropolitan city in Tamil Nadu, India. The Grand Northern Trunk Road passes through the neighbourhood as Erukkanchery High Road in Erukkanchery and Vyasarpadi.

== Location and Categorisation ==
Erukkanchery is located near Kodungaiyur, Moolakadai, Madhavaram, Vyasarpadi and Perambur. It is well connected by bus transport. It is very close to Moolakadai Junction. The nearest railway station of Erukkanchery is Perambur Railway Station which is 3 km away.

The Captain Cotton Canal (micro-canal) runs through Erukkanchery, connected to the Red Hills Dam. Though originally used for trade and prevention of flooding, in recent times, it is often polluted. Efforts have been made to clean up the canal regularly, with varying degrees of success. Guardrails were installed along the banks of the Canal to prevent drowning incidents, in multiple phases.

It is classified under the Kodungaiyur (East) administrative ward, Tondiarpet Zone of the Greater Chennai Corporation; with the nomenclature of the administrative categorisation derived from the more popular neighbourhoods occupying the region.

Legislatively, it comes under Perambur (State Assembly constituency) limits of the State of Tamil Nadu. The MLA T Sekar from the constituency was elected in 2021. It is also part of Chennai North Lok Sabha constituency on the national level.

== History ==
The area was a sparsely populated village and used as farming wetlands during the British Colonial Era and after independence of India up until the early 1970s. In the 1970s, the erstwhile Chennai Corporation (later succeeded by the Greater Chennai Corporation in 2011) began exploring city limit expansions to accommodate the city's rising population. As part of this effort, areas situated near major arterial routes — such as the TADA section, a key junction for several national highways extending from North Chennai to other metropolitan regions — were incorporated into the Chennai Corporation. One such area was the Erukkanchery neighbourhood. The development of the area as a residential neighbourhood started in the 1980s, though fervent development only started near the late 1980s or early 1990s.

In view of the start of the development of the area, the parish of Erukkanchery was established by the Roman Catholic Church on 24 May 1978 and entrusted the duties of the parish to the SDBs. Around 1998, a new church was constructed for the parish and Mother Teresa inaugurated the church. It was around this time that the control of the parish was handed over to the Archdiocese of Chennai and Mylapore, under administrative reorganisation.

The development of the neighbourhood was significantly influenced by the efforts of the Salesians, who established multiple schools in the area, including St. Joseph's Higher Secondary School in 1982 and Don Bosco Matriculation Higher Secondary School, Erukkanchery in June 1986 among others.

A Chennai Corporation school is also located in Erukkanchery. Notably, Arjuna, who later secured a bronze medal in the Under-12 category at the 2015 National Boxing Championships, was a student of this institution.

The Muthumariamman Temple at Erukencherry, Vijayalingeswarar Temple, Kamakshi Amman Temple, Singara Velavar Temple were also established over the years as the residential area developed. The temples are currently under the control of the Hindu Religious and Charitable Endowments Department, Government of Tamil Nadu. These temples conduct annual festivals every year.

The Samadhi of Siddhar Ethiraj Swamigal, who lived in Chennai, has been established in his name at Ethiraj Road, Erukkanchery by his spiritual devotees.

Multiple hospitals are also available in and near Erukkencherry.
