= GKM =

GKM may refer to:

- General Kumaramangalam Colony or "GKM Colony" in Chennai
- GKM College of Engineering and Technology in Chennai
- Generalized Kac–Moody algebra
- Grupo Kalise Menorquina, Spanish ice cream company
- Gebauer Kényszermeghajtású Motorgéppuska, machine gun designed by Franz Gebauer
- Gerard Klauer Mattison, company acquired by BMO Capital Markets in 2003
- Grenzkommando Mitte (Border Command Center), part of the Border Troops of the German Democratic Republic
- GKM star, a categorization of stars in astrophysics
