= Jawahar Nagar =

Jawahar Nagar ஜவஹர் நகர்
- Neighbourhood
- Location within Chennai Location within Tamil Nadu Location within India
- Coordinates: 13.112250°N 80.227440°E
- Country: India
- State: Tamil Nadu
- District: Chennai
- Metro: Chennai
- Elevation: 5 m (16 ft)

Languages
  - Official: Tamil
- Time zone: UTC+5:30 (IST)
- PIN: 600082
- Telephone code: 044
- Planning agency: CMDA
- City: Chennai
- Lok Sabha constituency: North Chennai
- Vidhan Sabha constituency: Kolathur
- Civic agency: Chennai Corporation

Jawahar Nagar (Tamil: ஜவஹர் நகர்), named after the first Prime Minister of India, Jawaharlal Nehru, is a developed residential area in North Chennai, a metropolitan city in Tamil Nadu, India.

== Location ==
Jawahar Nagar is located near Kolathur, Peravallur and Perambur.

== Sub-neighbourhoods ==
Agaram, Thiru. Vi. Ka. Nagar, Periyar Nagar, GKM Colony, Loco scheme Colony, Peravallur, Sembium, Anjugam Nagar, Kumaran Nagar, Villivakkam, Perambur and Kolathur are some of the important sub-neighbourhoods of Jawahar Nagar.

== Roads and streets ==
Off Paper mills road, Jawahar nagar first main road, Jawahar nagar second main road, Jawahar nagar third main road, Jawahar nagar fourth main road, Jawahar nagar fifth main road, Jawahar nagar sixth main road and SRP koil street (South) are some of the important roads and streets of Jawahar Nagar.

== Temple ==
- Sundararaja Perumal temple

== Railway stations ==
Perambur Loco Works railway station and Perambur Carriage Works railway station are situated near to Jawahar Nagar.
