= Surapet =

Surapet சூரப்பட்டு
- Neighbourhood
- Location within Chennai Location within Tamil Nadu Location within India
- Coordinates: 13°08′36.4″N 80°11′28.2″E
- Country: India
- State: Tamil Nadu
- District: Chennai
- Metro: Chennai
- Division: North Chennai
- Chennai Corporation Zone: III
- Chennai Corporation Ward: Old : 24 New : 32

Government
  - Body: Greater Chennai Corporation

Area
  - Total: 2.78 km^{2} (1.07 sq mi)

Population (2011)
  - Total: 10,444
  - Density: 3,760/km^{2} (9,730/sq mi)

Languages
  - Official: தமிழ் Tamil
- Time zone: UTC+5:30 (IST)
- PIN: 600066 600099
- Vehicle registration: TN-05 TN-18
- Lok Sabha constituency: North Chennai
- Vidhan Sabha constituency: Madhavaram
- Neighbourhoods: Ambathur, Kolathur, Puzhal, Korattur
- Website: https://chennaicorporation.gov.in/gcc/

Surapet, also known as Surapattu and Surapedu, is a neighbourhood in northwestern Chennai, India. Surapet is bordered by Puzhal in the north, Kolathur in the east, Puthagaram in the south, and Puzhal Lake in west.

== Transportation ==
=== Chennai Metro ===
The proposed second phase of the Chennai Metro has three lines. The third line is from Madhavaram Milk Colony to Sholinganallur. In that line, the proposed Retteri Metro Station and Kolathur Metro Station are 3 km away from Surapet.

=== Railway ===
The nearest railway station is Korattur Railway Station, 5 km away from Surapet. Chennai Egmore Railway Station and Chennai Central Railway Station, the two main railway terminals in Chennai, which are 14 km away from Surapet.

=== Roads ===
The Grand Northern Trunk Road is 3 km away from the neighbourhood and the Inner Ring Road is 3.5 km away.

The Chennai Bypass Road passes through the Surapet area and ends at National Highway 5, near Surapet.

== Water bodies ==
Water bodies located nearby include Puzhal aeri, Rettai eri, and Korattur Lake.

== History ==
The area, once a separate panchayat, has been part of the Chennai corporation administrative body since 2011, as the 24th ward in the Madhavaram constituency.
