= Kalpalayam =

- Village
- Location in Tamil Nadu, India
- Coordinates: 10.93°N 78.72°E
- Country: India
- State: Tamil Nadu
- District: Tiruchirappalli

Government
  - Type: Sarpanch (Head of Village)

Area
  - Total: 4.5441 km^{2} (1.7545 sq mi)

Population (2011)
  - Total: 3,865

Languages
  - Official: Tamil
- Time zone: UTC+5:30 (IST)
- PIN: 621005
- Telephone code: 0431

Kalpalayam is a village located in the Manachanallur taluk of the Tiruchirappalli district of the Indian state Tamil Nadu. It is situated 5 km away from taluk headquarter Manachanallur and 20 km away from district headquarter Tiruchirappalli.

According to the 2011 Census information, the total geographical area of the village is 454.41 hectares, and the total population is 3,865. According to the constitution of India and the Panchayat Raj ActKalpalayaage of Ayyampalayam is administered by the elected village representative Sarpanch (Head of Village).

The village of C.Ayyampalayam has a higher literacy rate than that of Tamil Nadu state. As per 2011 census, Kalpalayam village's literacy rate was 86.78 percent compared to Tamil Nadu's 80.09 percent.
