= M. K. B. Nagar =

Maha Kavi Bharathi Nagar
- Neighbourhood
- Maha Kavi Bharathi Nagar (Chennai) Maha Kavi Bharathi Nagar (Tamil Nadu)
- Coordinates: 13.125800°N 80.262100°E
- Country: India
- State: Tamil Nadu
- District: Chennai district
- Metro: Chennai
- Elevation: 28 m (92 ft)

Languages
  - Official: Tamil
- Time zone: UTC+5:30 (IST)
- PIN: 600039
- Vehicle registration: TN-05-yy-xxxx
- Lok Sabha constituency: Chennai North Lok Sabha constituency
- Vidhan Sabha constituency: Perambur Assembly constituency

MKB Nagar, also known as Maha kavi Bharathi Nagar, is mainly a residential locality in the northern part of the metropolitan city of Chennai, Tamil Nadu state, India. It was earlier known as Tamil Nadu Housing Board Colony until 1982.

== Location and Surroundings ==
MKB Nagar is located in North Chennai. It borders Kodungaiyur to the north, Mullai Nagar to the east, Vyasarpadi to the south-east. Erukkancheri High Road borders this area in south. The locality was planned by the State Housing Board. The locality also consists of Weavers Colony in the north.

It has CBSC school/govt school and all major banks and ATM's. MKB Nagar has supermarkets like Reliance.

Includes post office as well

== Transportation ==
Metropolitan Transport Corporation (MTC) runs passenger buses to MKB Nagar from other major parts of the Chennai city. There are two bus terminals in MKB Nagar: MKB Nagar and Mullai Magar (MKB Nagar East).

The nearest railway station is Vyasarpadi Jeeva.

== Politics ==
MKB Nagar comes under Perambur Assembly constituency and Chennai North Lok Sabha constituency.
