= Agaram =

- Neighbourhood
- Location within Chennai Location within Tamil Nadu Location within India
- Coordinates: 13.11025°N 80.23147°E
- Country: India
- State: Tamil Nadu
- District: Chennai
- Metro: Chennai
- Elevation: 58 m (190 ft)

Languages
  - Official: Tamil
- Time zone: UTC+5:30 (IST)
- PIN: 600082
- Telephone code: 044
- Planning agency: CMDA
- City: Chennai
- Lok Sabha constituency: North Chennai
- Vidhan Sabha constituency: Kolathur
- Civic agency: Greater Chennai Corporation

Agaram is a neighbourhood of Perambur and a developed residential area in North Chennai, a metropolitan city in Tamil Nadu, India.

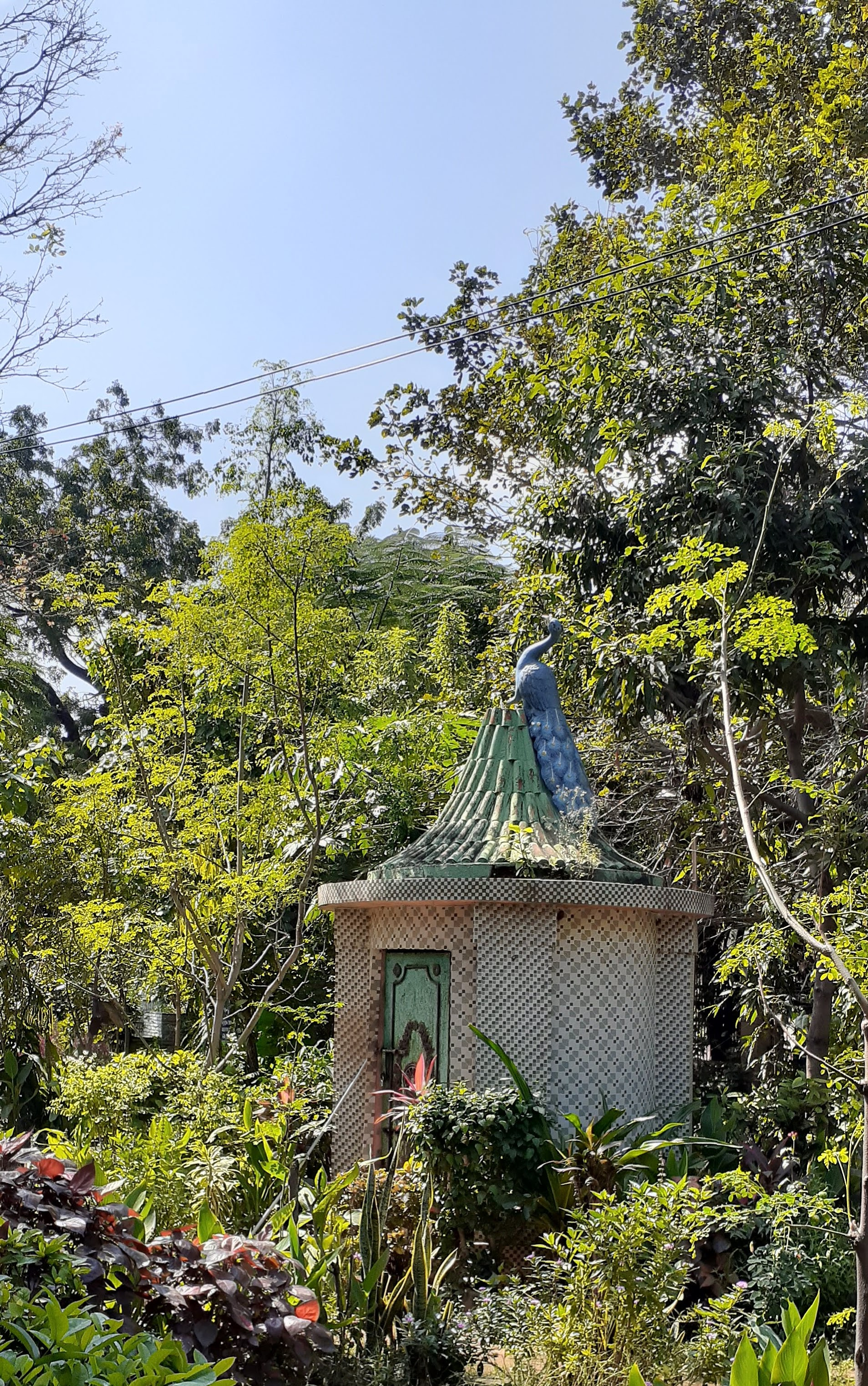
Anandan Park, Agaram, Chennai, Tamil Nadu, India.

== Location ==
Agaram is located near Kolathur, Chennai, Peravallur and is in Perambur. It is well connected by train and bus transport. It is very close to Perambur Loco Works Railway Station and Moolakadai Junction and Retteri Junction.

== Neighbouring Areas ==
Neighbourhoods nearby include:

- Periyar Nagar,
- Peravallur,
- Thiru. Vi. Ka Nagar,
- Jawahar Nagar,
- Villivakkam,
- and Sembiyan.

Kolathur, Chennai is a neighbouring state legislative assembly constituency.

== Roads and Streets ==
Roads and streets near Agaram include:

- Jawahar Nagar main roads.
- Paper Mills road.
- Sundararaja Perumal koil street.
- Sundararaja Perumal koil street (North)
- Sundararaja Perumal koil street (South)
- Kanakar street.
- Ballard street.
- Moorthy street.
- Palavayal street.
- Chidambaram street.
- and Thanthoni Amman koil street.

== Transport ==
=== Bus transport ===
Metropolitan Transport Corporation (Chennai) buses go across Agaram, to and fro the places mentioned above. The following are also well connected with road transport facilities: Puratchi Thalaivar Dr. M. G. Ramachandran Central railway station and Chennai Egmore railway station.

=== Rail transport ===
Some railway stations that are near Agaram include:

- Perambur Carriage Works railway station,
- Perambur railway station,
- Puratchi Thalaivar Dr M. G. Ramachandran Central railway station,
- and Chennai Egmore railway station.

== Places of Worship ==
=== Temples ===
- Shri Sundararaja Perumal (SRP) temple.
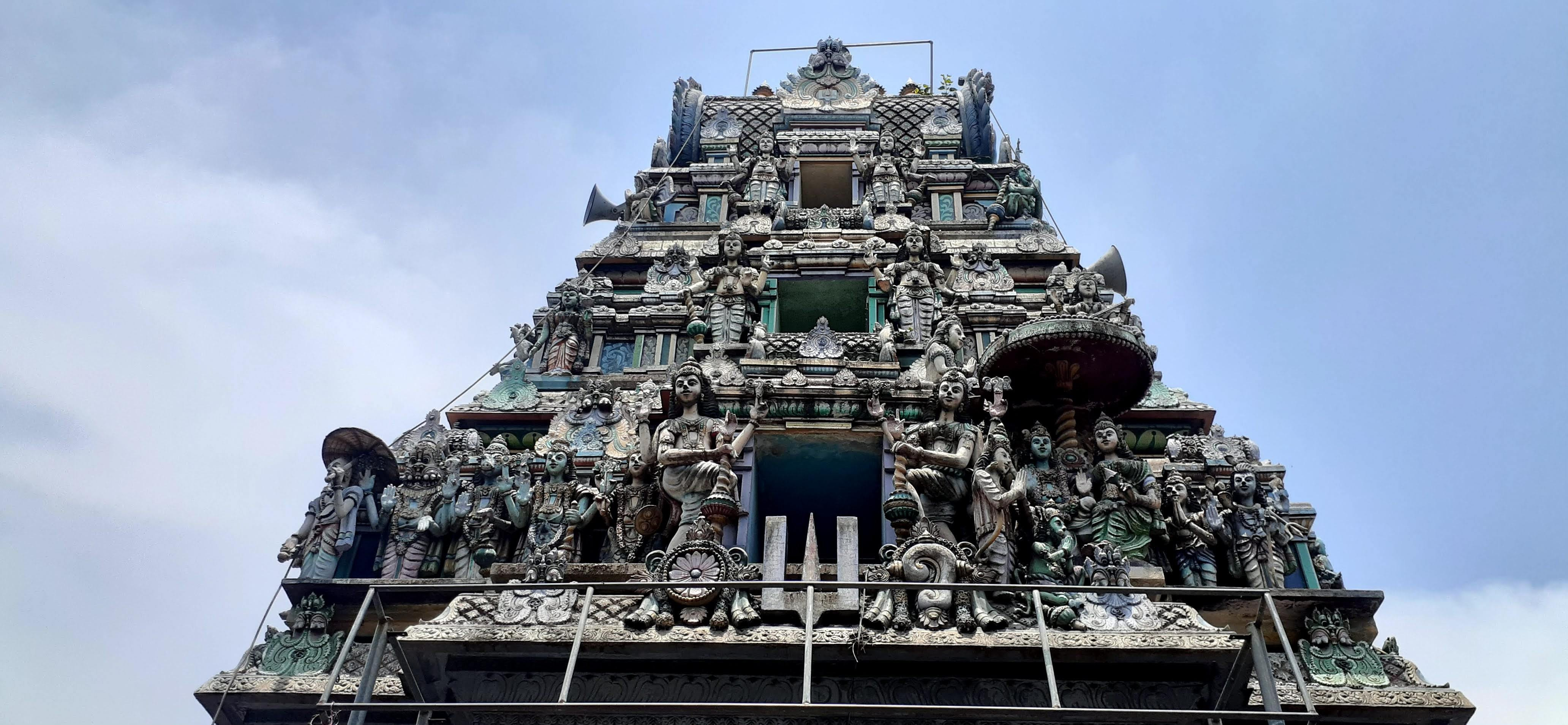
Shri Sundararaja Perumal Temple Tower backed by blue sky, Agaram, Perambur, Chennai, Tamil Nadu, India.

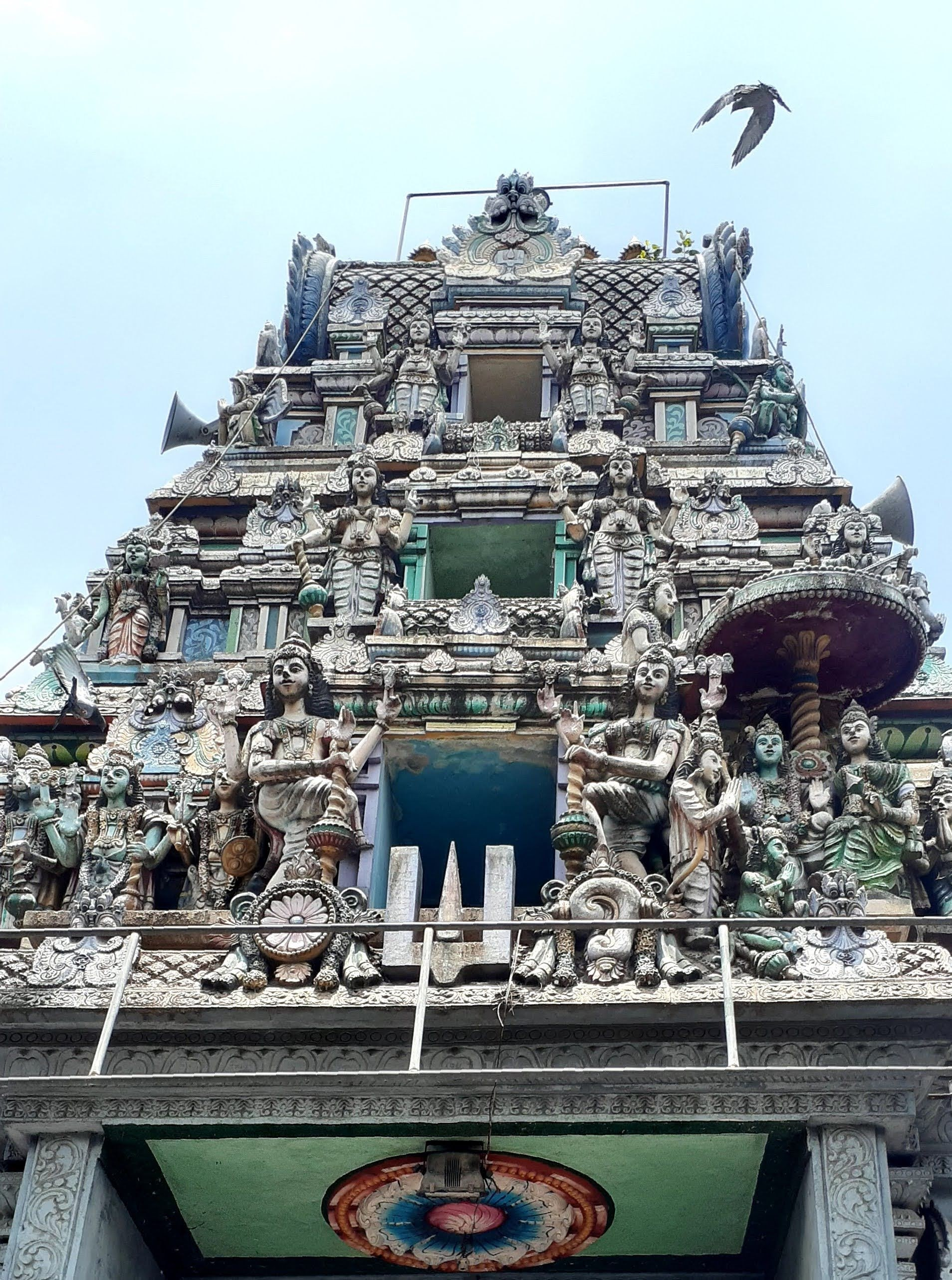
Shri Sundararaja Perumal Temple Tower, Agaram, Perambur, Chennai, Tamil Nadu. India.

Some temples include:

- Shri Thanthontri Amman temple,
- Shri Kothandaramasamy temple,
- Shri Radha Rukmani sametha Kannabiran temple,
- Shri Brahmapureeshwarar temple,
- Shri Prasanna Venugopalaswamy temple,
- Shri Prasanna Vinayagar temple,
- Shri Mahalakshmi Amman temple,
- and Shri Prasanna Balasubramaniya swamy temple.
