= Peravallur Sundararaja Perumal Temple =

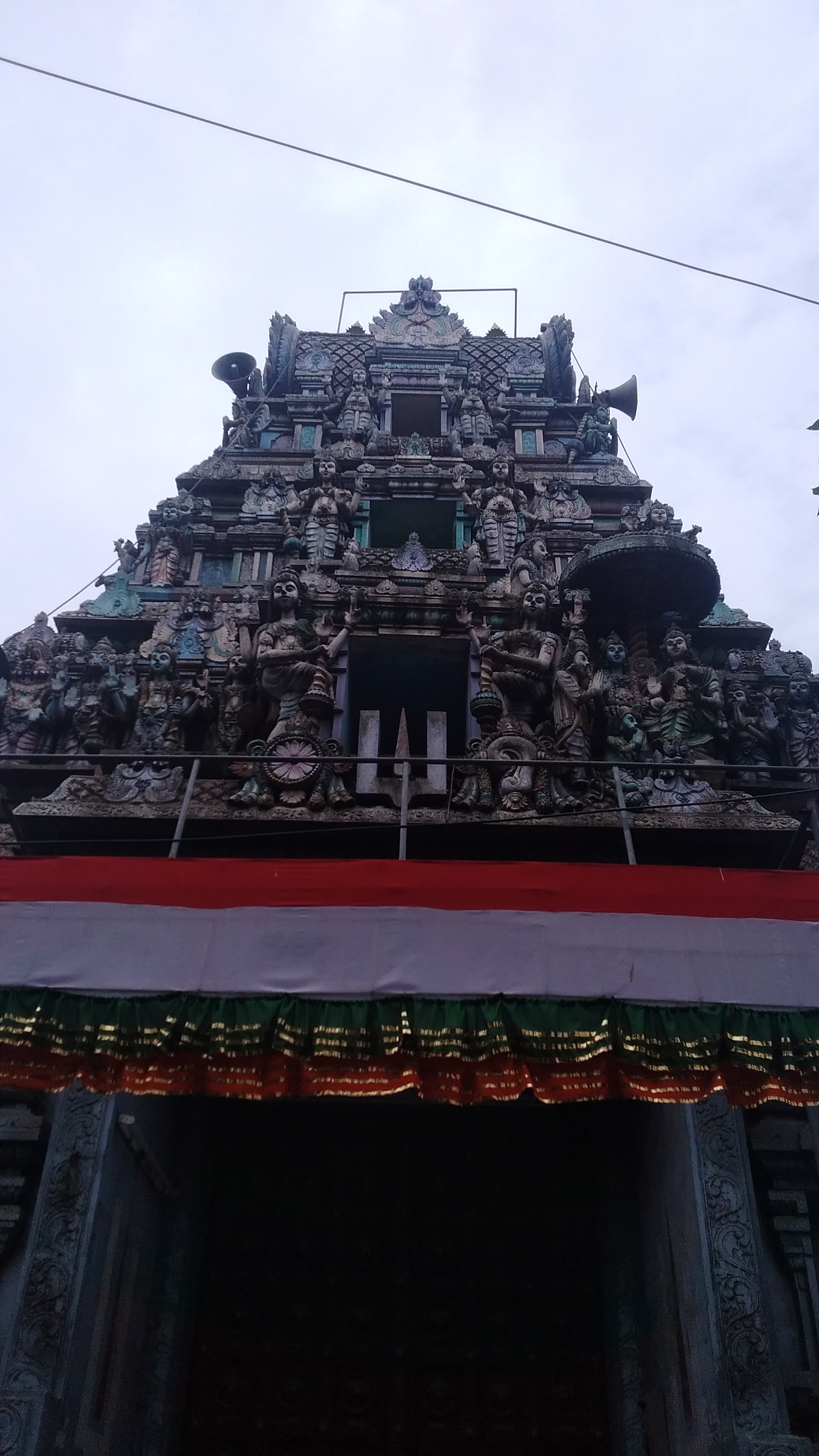
- Sundararaja Perumal Temple, Peravallur, Chennai

- Sundararaja Perumal Temple, Peravallur, Chennai, Tamil Nadu

Religion
- Affiliation: Hinduism
- District: Chennai district
- Deity: Sundararaja Perumal
- Festival: Vaikuntha Ekadashi

Location
- Location: Peravallur
- State: Tamil Nadu
- Country: India
- Interactive map of Peravallur Sundararaja Perumal Temple
- Coordinates: 13.112255°N 80.231445°E

Architecture
- Type: Dravidian architecture

Specifications
- Temple: One
- Elevation: 33.06 m (108 ft)

Sundararaja Perumal Temple is a Perumal temple situated at Peravallur neighbourhood in Chennai district of Tamil Nadu state in India.

== Other name ==
This temple is also called as Periyar Nagar Sundararaja Perumal Temple as this temple is situated near Periyar Nagar.

== Maintenance ==
This temple is maintained under the control of the Hindu Religious and Charitable Endowments Department, Government of Tamil Nadu.
