= Padianallur =

- Neighbourhood
- Location in Tamil Nadu, India Padianallur (Tamil Nadu) Padianallur (India)
- Coordinates: 13.204184°N 80.175126°E
- Country: India
- State: Tamil Nadu
- District: Tiruvallur
- Taluk: Ponneri
- Metro: Chennai
- MLA Constituency: Madhavaram
- MP Constituency: Tiruvallur

Area
  - Total: 4.52 km^{2} (1.75 sq mi)

Population (2011)
  - Total: 23,819
  - Density: 5,270/km^{2} (13,600/sq mi)

Languages
  - Official: Tamil
- Time zone: UTC+5:30 (IST)
- PIN: 600052
- Vehicle registration: TN-18

Padianallur is a town in the northern part of Chennai, Thiruvallur district of Indian state Tamil Nadu. It is located 34 km towards East from District headquarters Tiruvallur. 4 km from Sholavaram. It is situated near the industrial and residential areas of Chennai City.

== Etymology ==
Thiruneetreshwarar Temple is a Hindu Temple dedicated to Lord Shiva located at Padiyanallur in Thiruvallur District of Tamil Nadu. Presiding Deity is called as Thiruneetreshwarar and Mother is called as Thiru Loganayaki. This is the oldest temple of all in Padiyanallur, the name Padiyanallur for this village came because, one of the Nayanmar has sung a song in this temple. Hence the name Padiyanallur came for this village. This temple has an old Tamil scripting dating back 700–1000 years to the pandya period.

== Demographics ==
As of 2011 India census, Padianallur had a population of 23,819. Males constitute 12043 of the population and females 11776. Padianallur has an average literacy rate of 90.36%, higher than the national average of 74.4%: male literacy is 94.16%, and female literacy is 86.5%. The gap in male-female literacy rate is 7.63%.

== Amenities ==
- Padianallur Primary Health Center
- Sri Venkateswaraa med city hospital
- Rela ms hospital
- SKLS GALAXY MALL

== Festival ==
- The celebration for god Angaala Parameshwari Amman in Padianallur Angaala Parameshwari Temple happens during the month of March and April.

== Education ==
- Government Higher Secondary School, Padianallur
- St. Mary's Matriculation Higher Secondary School
- Elite Matriculation Higher Secondary School
- Alpha Matriculation Higher Secondary School
- Children's Paradise Matriculation Higher Secondary School
- St.Joseph Matriculation Higher Secondary School
