= Moolakadai Junction =

Bridge in India

- மூலக்கடை சந்திப்பு
- Interactive map of Moolakadai Junction

Location
- Chennai, India
- Coordinates: 13.128937°N 80.241453°E
- Roads at junction: Grand Northern Trunk Road (NH 5); Madhavaram High Road; Tondiarpet High Road; Kamaraj Road

Construction
- Type: Flyover
- Lanes: 4
- Opened: 13 November 2015; 10 years ago
- Maintained by: National Highway Authority of India

Moolakadai Junction is an important road junction in Chennai, India. It is located at Moolakadai at the intersection of the Grand Northern Trunk Road (NH 5), Madhavaram High Road, Tondiarpet High Road, Kamaraj Road.

Moolakadai is primarily a high traffic area in North Chennai due to the movement of Heavy vehicles (mainly containers) as most of those heavy vehicles have to pass through Moolakadai in order to reach the Chennai Port.

For those who come from South Chennai, Moolakadai acts as the gateway to the areas like

History of moolakadai was that once a tea shop was situated corner of all three side roads connecting spot which used renowned landmark of that period Madhavaram, Kodungaiyur, Madhavaram Milk Colony, Mathur MMDA, Manali, Vyasarpadi, Puzhal, Redhills, Karanodai.

== Construction History ==
The Flyover constructing work is started by January 2011.

The Construction work delayed due to reasons such as election period, land acquisition which results anger the residents which suffering high traffic congestion.

On 4 May 2015, the state government of Tamil Nadu informed Madras High Court that the bridge should be opened for public in 3 months.

== Opened for Public Service ==
The Moolakadai Flyover was opened on 13 November 2015.

== See also ==
- Madhavaram Junction
- Koyambedu Junction
- Kathipara Junction
- Padi Junction
- Maduravoyal Junction
- Irumbuliyur Junction
- Madhya Kailash Junction
