= V. S. Babu =

Indian politician (1951–2026)

Member of the Tamil Nadu Legislative Assembly
- In office 4 May 2026 – 19 November 2026
- Chief Minister: C. Joseph Vijay
- Preceded by: M. K. Stalin
- Constituency: Kolathur
- In office 11 May 2006 – 13 May 2011
- Chief Minister: M. Karunanidhi
- Preceded by: B. Ranganathan
- Succeeded by: Constituency defunct
- Constituency: Purasawalkam

Personal details
- Born: 1951
- Died: 19 November 2026 (aged 75) Chennai, Tamil Nadu, India
- Party: Tamilaga Vettri Kazhagam (2026)
- Other political affiliations: Dravida Munnetra Kazhagam (2006–2011); AIADMK (2016–2026)
- Parent: V. Sundarampillai (father)
- Education: Singarapillai school, Villivakkam

V. Sundarampillai Babu (1951 – 19 November 2026) was an Indian politician from Tamil Nadu. He was a member of the Tamil Nadu Legislative Assembly from the Kolathur Assembly constituency in 2026 and Purasawalkam Assembly constituency from 2006 till 2011.

== Personal Details ==
He was born in 1951 to V. Sundarampillai and attended Singarapillai school, Villivakkam.

== Career ==
He won the 2006 Tamil Nadu Legislative Assembly election representing the Dravida Munnetra Kazhagam (DMK). As a former DMK Public Servant, he would become the party’s north Chennai district in-charge and oversaw the 2011 election campaign in the newly established Kolathur constituency instrumental in election work for M. K. Stalin. Following a narrower-than-expected victory in the campaign, DMK said he was removed from this post and in 2016 joined the AIADMK party.

On 7 February 2026, he joined Tamizhaga Vettri Kazhagam and was nominated to contest against the incumbent chief minister M. K. Stalin in the Kolathur constituency in the 2026 Tamil Nadu Legislative Assembly election. He garnered 82,997 votes and won the constituency by a margin of 8,795.

He was DMK's North Chennai District Secretary until 2011. During his time, P.K. Sekar Babu was his peer in AIADMK in the same post.

He was popularly known in political circles as Purasai Babu and was well known for his party work in Ayanavaram, ICF and Purasai till Jamalia.

== Electoral performances ==
=== 2026: ===
2026 Tamil Nadu Legislative Assembly election: Kolathur
Party	Candidate	Votes	%	±%
TVK	V. S. Babu	82,997	45.09	New
DMK	M. K. Stalin	74,202	40.32	▼20.54
AIADMK	P. Santhana Krishnan	18,430	10.01	▼10.26
NTK	A. Soundarapandian Loutherseth	5,046	2.74	▼3.78
NOTA	None of the above	892	0.48	▼0.40
Margin of victory		8,795	4.78	▼35.81
Turnout		1,84,051		
Rejected ballots				
Registered electors				
TVK gain from DMK		Swing		

=== 2006: ===
2006 Tamil Nadu Legislative Assembly election: Purasawalkam
Party	Candidate	Votes	%	±%
DMK	V. S. Babu	90,140	53.74	
AIADMK	T. G. Venkatesh Babu	82,777	49.35	
DMDK	Jacquelene Gomez	12,690	7.57	
BJP	Elumalai. V.	2,019	1.20	
SWA	Kamalaakannan. J.	769	0.46	
Independent	Raja. K.	603	0.36	
Margin of victory		7,363	4.39	1.74
Turnout		167,730	87.51	−45.83
DMK hold		Swing	5.21	

== Death ==
Babu died at age 75 on November 19, 2026, at 2:24 p.m. from a cardiac arrest while under prolonged intensive care at MGM Healthcare in Aminjikarai. He was admitted to the hospital after facing respiratory issues. The previous day, a Kolathur resident filed a criminal plea at the Madras High Court, seeking disclosure of information about Babu's health and arrangements made to address constituency matters in his absence.
