= Senthil Nagar =

Neighbourhood in Chennai district, Tamil Nadu, India

Senthil Nagar Thirumullaivoyil
- Suburban
- Location within Chennai Location within Tamil Nadu Location within India
- Coordinates: 13°11′5″N 80°13′6″E
- Country: India
- State: Tamil Nadu
- District: Chennai

Languages
  - Official: Tamil
- Time zone: UTC+5:30 (IST)
- PIN: 600062
- Telephone code: 044-2637/2638
- Vehicle registration: TN-13
- Nearest city: Chennai
- Lok Sabha constituency: Avadi

Senthil Nagar is a residential area located between Avadi and Ambattur railway stations in the city of Chennai comes under Chennai district. It comes under Kolathur Assembly constituency.

It is a developing township mainly focused on housing units. Valampuri Vinayagar Temple, Thirumullaivoyil Railway Station, Rangaswamy Matriculation School, Tiny Tot Kids School, Anna Auditorium and Kalaimagal Matriculation School are the main reference points for this small residential township, also is the famous "banyan tree" (Aala maram).

Thirumullaivoyal railway station is the nearest railway station for senthil nagar and is located about 500 meters from the Mahathma Gandhi Main road,( senthil nagar ). The railway station connects local areas like Chennai central station, Madras beach station, Arakkonam and Tiruvallur.

By road it is nearly 22 km from Chennai central station, 4 km from Chennai bye pass and 24 km from Chennai domestic airport. Ambattur O.T is nearly about 2.5 km and 2.2 km to Thirumullaivoyil from senthil nagar respectively. Chennai bye pass located about 4 km from senthil nagar which connects way to NH4( Bangalore Highway), G.S.T road, Kolkata Highway.

It is a constantly developing and improving area and it has been active since 1970, and more recently, development has increased dramatically with many facilities like public transit system, medical clinics, commercial complexes, schools, college, auditorium, bus stand, play ground, etc. Bus routes connecting Senthil nagar via Thirumullaivoyil are M147S ( to T.Nagar), 41D ext.( to Mandaveli) and 71F to C.M.B.T via Ambattur, also train routes available to most parts of the city and its outskirts.

In September 2023, a new foot over bridge was proposed at Senthil Nagar with elevators and escalators to bring down pedestrian accidents.

It comes under Ward 11 of Avadi Municipality.
