= Karanodai =

- suburb
- Location in Chennai, India Karanodai (Tamil Nadu) Karanodai (India)
- Coordinates: 13.2363°N 80.1613°E
- Country: India
- State: Tamil Nadu
- District: Thiruvallur District
- Metro: Chennai
- Named for: Lot of Streams(Odai yin karanamaga vanthathal)
- Talukas: Ponneri Taluk

Government
  - Body: CMDA

Languages
  - Official: Tamil
- Time zone: UTC+5:30 (IST)
- PIN: 600067
- Planning agency: CMDA

Karanodai is a northern suburb of Chennai, India located 7 km north of Redhills on GNT Road connecting Chennai with Andhra Pradesh. The town is bounded on north side by Kosasthalaiyar River, also known as Kortalaiyar, which is one of the three rivers that flow in the Chennai metropolitan area.

It is surrounded by nearby villages like Authur, Sothuperumbedu, Sholavaram, Orakkadu, Nerkundram. Karanodai falls under Madhavaram Constituency in the Tamil Nadu Legislative Assembly, and falls under Thiruvallur Constituency in the Lok Sabha.

== Schools ==
- Don Bosco Matriculation Higher Secondary School.
- Government Higher Secondary School, Sholavaram.

== Theatres ==
- Gopalakrishana Theatre.

== Karanodai Bridge ==
Built by the British Engineers this is one of the oldest bridge in the Chennai region which is on Chennai-Kolkata National Highway 5 connecting Chennai and Northern parts of India. Residents of Karanodai recalled the existing facility came up after the 125-year-old Karanodai bridge became dysfunctional fifteen years ago when its three spans were washed away by heavy flows in the river, caused due to the monsoon rains. A few two-wheelers continued to use it until the facility completely collapsed in December 2007.

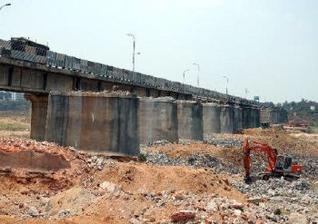
Bridge
