= Kolathur, Chennai =

Neighborhood in Chennai District, Tamil Nadu State, India

Kolathur
- Neighbourhood
- Kolathur, (Chennai) Kolathur (Tamil Nadu) Kolathur (India)
- Coordinates: 13°07′26.4″N 80°12′43.6″E
- Country: India
- State: Tamil Nadu
- District: Chennai
- Elevation: 35 m (115 ft)

Population (2011)
  - Total: 110,474

Language
  - Official: Tamil
- Time zone: UTC+5:30 (IST)
- PIN: 600099
- Telephone Code: +9144
- Vehicle registration: TN 05 yy xxxx
- Neighborhoods: korattur, Villivakkam, Perambur, Surapet, Madhavaram, Retteri, Ayanavaram, Anna Nagar, Sembium, Agaram, Periyar Nagar, Jawahar Nagar, Thiru. Vi. Ka. Nagar, Peravallur.
- Municipal body: Greater Chennai Corporation
- Zone & Ward: 6 & 64
- LS: Chennai North (Lok Sabha constituency)
- VS: Kolathur (state assembly constituency)
- MP: Dr. Kalanidhi Veeraswamy
- MLA: V. S. Babu, TVK
- Website: https://chennaicorporation.gov.in

Kolathur is a neighborhood located in the northwestern region of Chennai, in Tamil Nadu, India.

== Demographics ==
As per Census of India 2011, the total population of Kolathur, Chennai was 1,10,474. Out of this, the male population contributed 55,689 whereas the female population was 54,785. Out of this, 15,214 (males: 7,695 and females: 7,519) were Scheduled Castes and 552 (males: 289 and females: 263) were Scheduled Tribes. The population of children below 6 years of age was 11,760 (males: 6,091 and females: 5,669). Literates of Kolathur constitute 92,248, out of which males were 47,663 and females were 44,585.

== Education ==
=== Schools ===
Some of the important schools in Kolathur are Everwin Vidhyashram, Don Bosco Higher Secondary School, Government Higher Secondary School and Everwin Matriculation Higher Secondary School., Smt. Durgadevi Choudary Vivekananda Vidyalaya and Godson Public school (surapet main road) is another famous school.

=== College ===
There is an Arts and Science College viz., Arulmigu Kapaleeswarar Arts and Science College, soka ikeda Arts & science college for Women and Annai voilet arts and science college

== Political notability ==
Kolathur Assembly constituency, in Chennai is a newly formed assembly constituency. Kolathur lies in the Ward number 64 (old number 62) of the Greater Chennai Corporation.

Kolathur comes under the zone VI (six) of Chennai Corporation viz. Thiru. Vi. Ka Nagar Zone.

This neighborhood comes under Kolathur (state assembly constituency). Kolathur (state assembly constituency) is one of the six Assembly Constituencies that constitute Chennai North Lok Sabha constituency.

== Places of worship ==
1. Shri Somanatha Swamy Temple.
2. Shri Lakshmi Narayana Perumal Temple, Kolathur.

== Ornamental fish market ==
Kolathur is known for its ornamental fish market with around 500 families is involved in production and trade and selling over 10 lakh ornamental fishes on daily basis.
