= Peravallur =

Peravallur Peravalloor
- Neighbourhood
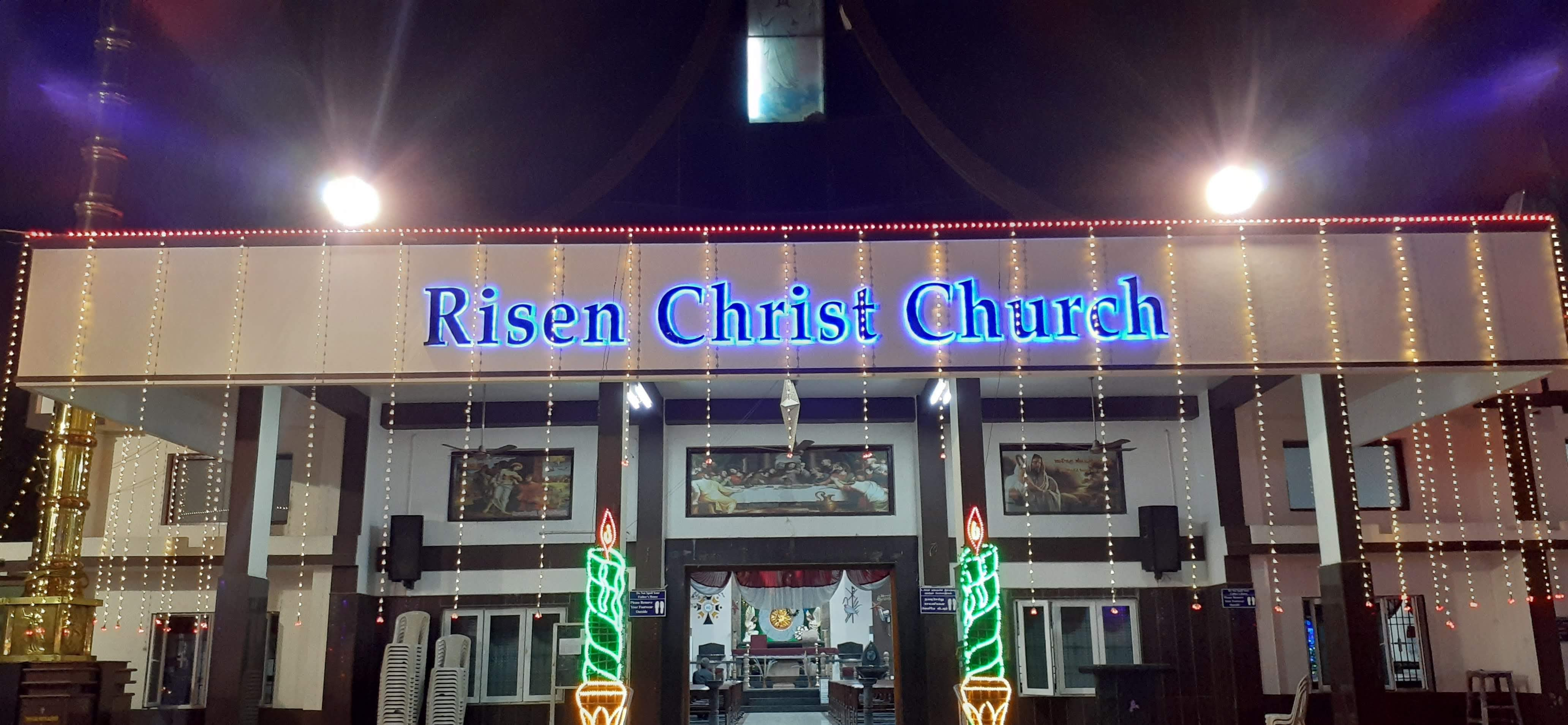

- Location within Chennai Location within Tamil Nadu Location within India
- Coordinates: 13°07′04″N 80°13′48″E
- Country: India
- State: Tamil Nadu
- District: Chennai
- Metro: Chennai
- Elevation: 56 m (184 ft)

Languages
  - Official: Tamil
- Time zone: UTC+5:30 (IST)
- PIN: 600082
- Telephone code: 044
- Planning agency: CMDA
- City: Chennai
- Lok Sabha constituency: Chennai North (Lok Sabha constituency)
- Vidhan Sabha constituency: Kolathur (state assembly constituency)
- Civic agency: Greater Chennai Corporation

Peravallur is a developed residential area, located on the north - western corner of Madras (renamed to Chennai), a metropolitan city in Tamil Nadu state, India. Out of 1018 places to be renamed by the government of Tamil Nadu, Peravallur is the one to be renamed as "Peravalloor". CMDA (Chennai Metropolitan Development Authority) is the town planning agency for Peravallur. Official language is Tamil; Postal pincode is 600082; Greater Chennai Corporation is the Civic body. A police station viz., K - 5 Peravallur Police Station for this neighborhood is built a year ago with ample space, at the junction of Venkatesan Salai and (70 feet road) Siva Elango Salai in Jawahar Nagar near Perambur.

== Location ==
Peravallur is located near Kolathur and Perambur. It is situated in Chennai at an altitude of 10m above mean sea level.

=== Boundaries ===
Peravallur neighborhood is bounded in the direction of Northwest by Kolathur, Chennai, North by TVK Nagar, Northeast by Sembium, West by Periyar Nagar, East by Perambur, Southwest by Jawahar Nagar, South by Siruvallur and Southeast by Perambur.

=== Neighborhoods ===
Kolathur, Agaram, Ponniammanmedu, Periyar Nagar, Thiru. Vi. Ka. Nagar, Jawahar Nagar, Sembium, Villivakkam and Perambur are some of the important neighborhoods of Peravallur. Paper Mills road, KC Garden, SRP koil street (North) and Ram nagar streets are some of the important roads that connect nearby areas. SRP Colony, Balaji Nagar, Ram Nagar, Lakshmanan Nagar are some of the important subneighborhoods of Peravallur.

== Place of Worship ==
=== Church ===
Risen Christ Church, which is located on Paper Mills road, Peravallur.

=== Temples ===
==== Athma Lingeswarar Temple, Peravallur ====
Sri Vaithiyanatha Athma Lingeswarar Thaiyal nayagi Amman temple, Peravallur. The oldest siva temples, also Siddhar temple near Chennai. The deity is a goddess, Sri Vaithiyanatha Athma Lingeswarar Thaiyal nayagi Amman. It is located very near, 2 km form Andarkuppam Murugan temple, also 8 km form Siruvapuri Shri Balasubramaniaswamy Temple.

==== Peravallur Chinthamani Vinayagar Temple ====
Peravallur Chinthamani Vinayagar Temple, which is controlled by Hindu Religious and Charitable Endowments Department, is located on T. A. koil street.

==== Sri Thanthondri Amman Temple ====
Sri Thanthondri Amman Temple is located at T. A. Koil Street, Peravallur. It is one of the oldest temples in the area. The deity is a goddess, who originated directly from the land in the form of three erect stones, thus giving her the name 'Thanthondri'. Yearly, Aadi(tamil month) festival is conducted in the temple, and the festival lasts for approximately 20 days and the 'poo-midhi' practice at the final day. More than 1000 people take part in the festival and around 50,000 visitors visit the temple during the festival time.

== Gallery ==
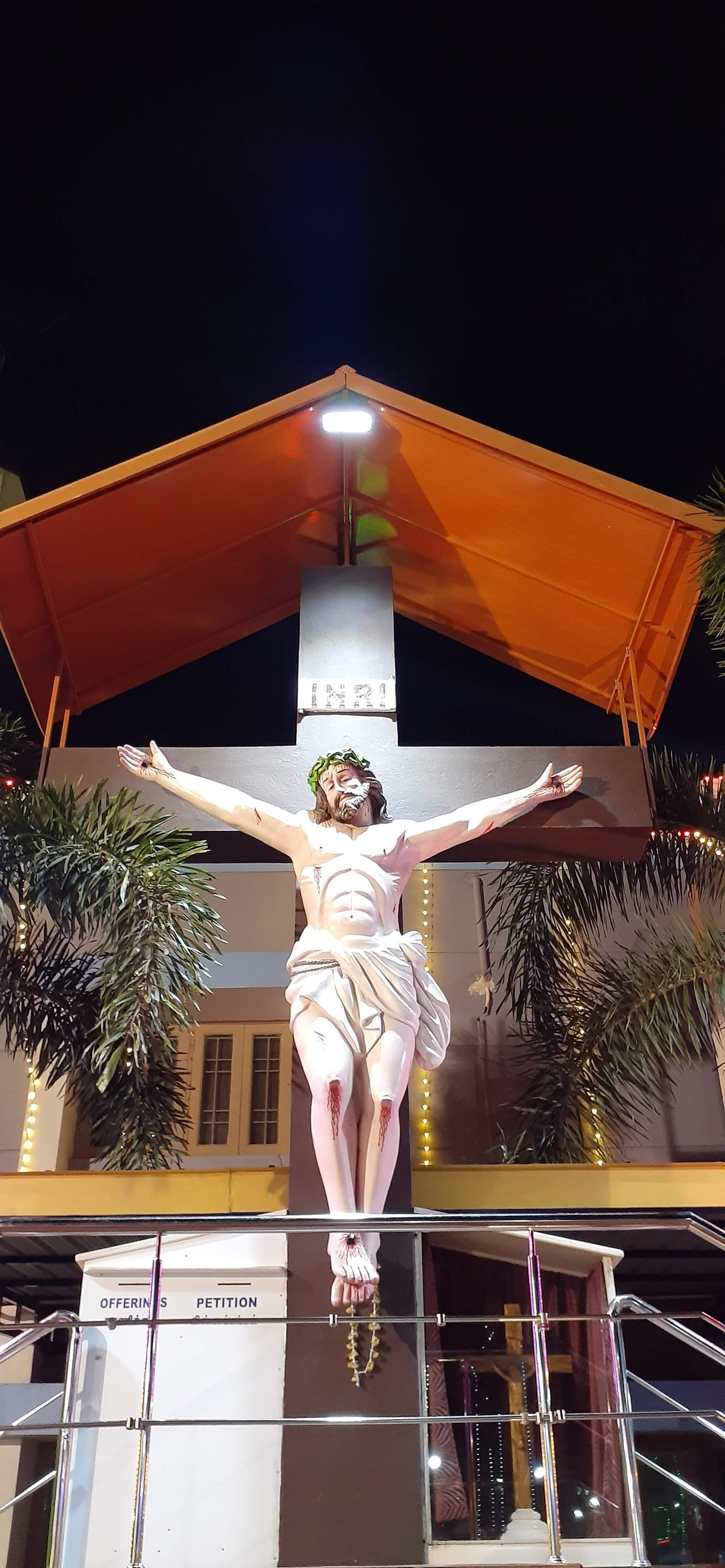
The Risen Christ Church, Tamil Nadu, India.

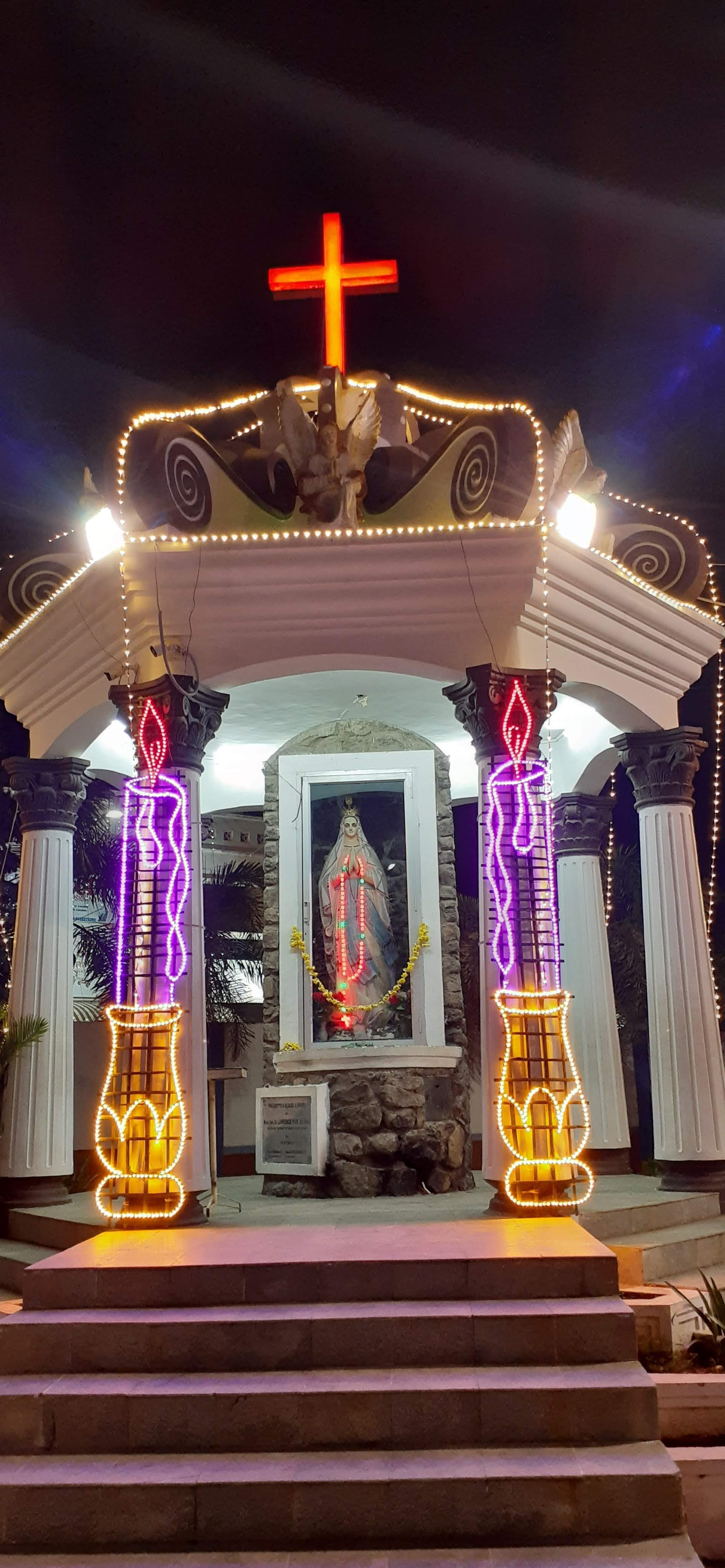
New year Eve, at 'Risen Christ Church', Chennai, Tamil Nadu, India.

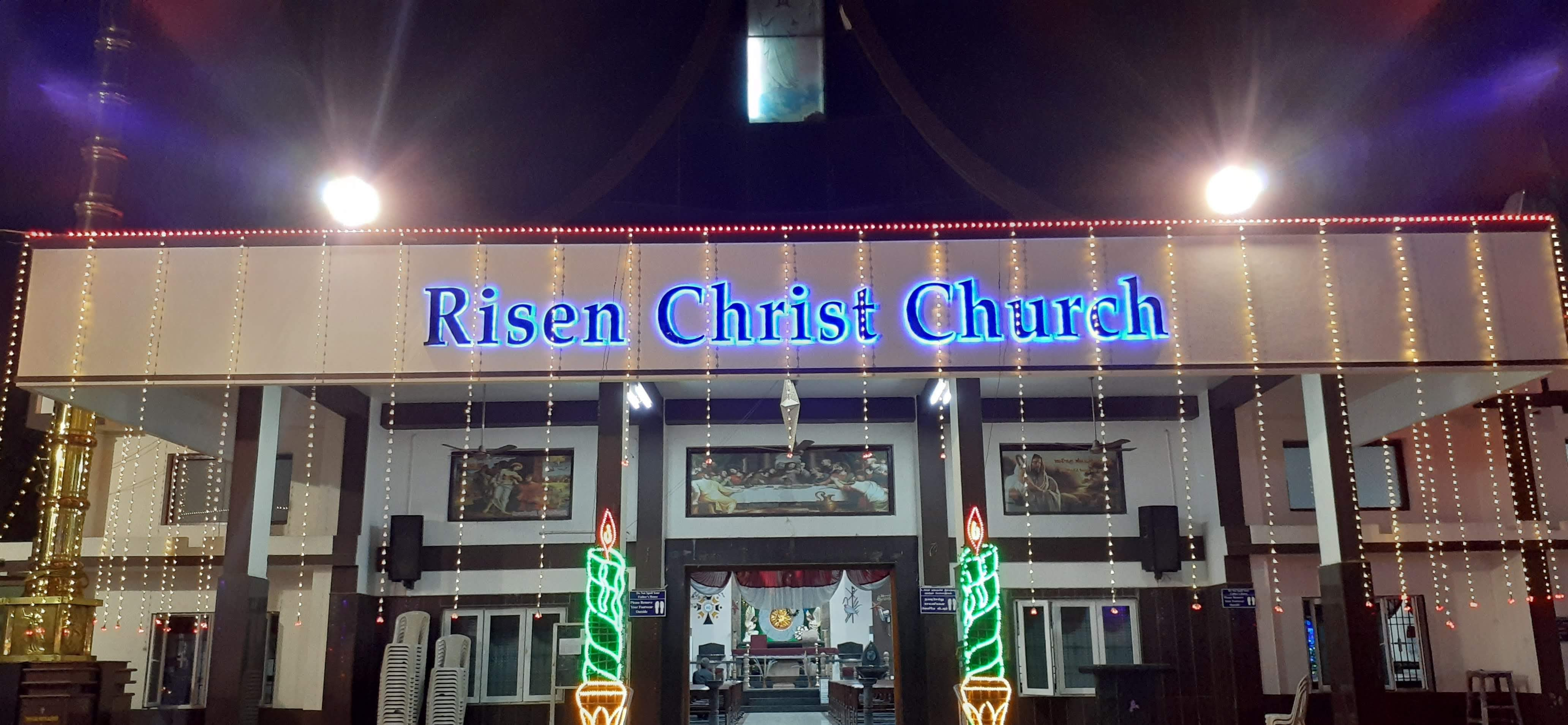
Risen Christ Church, Peravallur, Chennai, India.

== Political notability ==
Peravallur comes under Kolathur (state assembly constituency) and Chennai North (Lok Sabha constituency) is its Parliamentary Constituency.
