= Retteri =

Lake in India

- Location within Chennai
- Location: Kolathur, Chennai, India
- Coordinates: 13.144°N 80.213°E
- Type: Lake
- Basin countries: India
- Surface area: 700 acres (280 ha) (water spread area: 400 acres (160 ha))
- Settlements: Chennai

Rettai Eri, locally known as Retteri, is a lake in the Kolathur area of Chennai, India which is visible from the 100 ft road. Redhills road Junction is also named as Retteri Junction. The Government has planned to construct a flyover at this junction.

== Makeover ==
The Grand Northern Trunk (GNT) Road cuts across the Rettai Eri. The lake covering 5.42-million sq. metre is being converted into an eco-tourism spot. The lake, which was once a drinking water source for the neighbourhood, now has water for most part of the year and is a haven for birds. According to Care Earth Trust, a city-based biodiversity research organisation, about 40 different species of birds have been sighted in the lake along with the Ambattur and Korattur lakes. Among them are the common tailorbird, the purple-rumped sunbird and the Asian openbill stork, a migratory bird.

The lake, which was in a state of neglect for several decades, gets inflows from Red Hills reservoir and Korattur lake. The Water Resources Department (WRD) has decided to improve Rettai Eri along with waterbodies in Ambattur and Korattur at a cost of 850 million Indian rupees. The improvement works include removing vegetation, desilting, introducing boating, and developing a park along the 3-km bund. Other works include planting various species of medicinal and flowering saplings to attract butterflies and birds, creating a walkers' path and a mud flat in the middle of the lake.

== See also ==
- Water management in Chennai
