= Ponniammanmedu =

- Neighbourhood
- Location within Chennai Location within Tamil Nadu Location within India
- Coordinates: 13.129886°N 80.234778°E
- Country: India
- State: Tamil Nadu
- District: Chennai district
- Metro: Chennai
- Zone: Madhavaram Zone No 3
- Elevation: 7 m (23 ft)

Languages
  - Official: Tamil
- Time zone: UTC+5:30 (IST)
- PIN: 600110
- Telephone code: 044
- Vehicle registration: TN-05-xx-xxxx
- Planning agency: CMDA
- City: Chennai
- Lok Sabha constituency: North Chennai
- Vidhan Sabha constituency: Madhavaram
- Civic agency: Chennai Corporation

Ponniammanmedu is a developing residential area and mid-segment locatlity in North Chennai, a metropolitan city in Tamil Nadu, India. Ponniammanmedu is governed under the Tiruvallur district.

== Facilities ==
=== Schools ===
Ponniammanmedu has several educational facilities located within and near itself. These include the CSI Middle School, Matriculation Higher Secondary School, and Singaram Pillai Girls High School, among others.

=== Hospitals ===
The locality of Ponniammanmedu has multiple nursing homes, clinics, and hospitals nearby.

=== Shopping ===
Ponniammanmedu has several shopping complexes located around the area. These include the Lily Pond, Alsa Mall, and Cisons Shopping Complexes, and Chintadripet Market.

== Sub-Neighbourhoods ==
Ponniammanmedu has multiple small localities located within itself. These sub-localities include:

- Kodungaiyur
- Balaji Nagar
- Kumaran Nagar
- Peravallur
- Kolathur
- Moolakadai
- Madhavaram
- Retteri junction
- Thiruppathi Nagar
- Vajravel Nagar
- Balakumaran Nagar

== Religion ==
=== Temples ===
Ponniammanmedu has numerous temples. These include the Somanatheswar, Lakshmi Amman, and Sri Shenbaga Vinayagar Temples.

=== Churches ===
CSI Church and Perambu Lourdes Church are some of the important churches here.

== Transportation ==
=== Buses ===
Ponniammanmedu is easily accessible from the Moolakadai and Madhavaram bus terminals. Two frequent-service minibus shuttles also travel via Ponniammanmedu - the S61 Madhavaram to Perambur service, and the S68 Moolakadai to Agaram service. Ponniammanmedu is also served by the MTC public bus service.

=== Rail ===
There are several nearby rail stations, including the Perambur Locomotive Works, Perambur, Vyasarpadi Jeeva, and Perambur Carriage Works Railway Stations.

=== Aviation ===
The closest airport to the Ponniammanmedu neighbourhood is Chennai International Airport, which serves both domestic and international destinations.
