= Kolathur Assembly constituency =

State Legislative Assembly Constituency in Tamil Nadu

Coordinates: 11.51°N 77.45°E

Kolathur
- Constituency No. 13 for the Tamil Nadu Legislative Assembly
- Interactive map outlining Kolathur assembly constituency in Chennai district

Constituency details
- Country: India
- Region: South India
- State: Tamil Nadu
- District: Chennai
- Lok Sabha constituency: Chennai North
- Established: 2008
- Total electors: 211,772
- Reservation: None

Member of Legislative Assembly
- 17th Tamil Nadu Legislative Assembly
- Incumbent Vacant
- Elected year: 2026

Kolathur State Assembly constituency (Tamil: கொளத்தூர் சட்டமன்றத் தொகுதி) is one of the 234 state legislative assembly constituencies in Tamil Nadu in southern India. Its State Assembly Constituency number is 13. It is also one of the six state legislative assembly constituencies included in Chennai North Lok Sabha constituency. This constituency was last represented by V. S. Babu of TVK.

== Members of the Legislative Assembly ==
Year	Member	Political party
2011	M. K. Stalin	Dravida Munnetra Kazhagam
2016	M. K. Stalin	Dravida Munnetra Kazhagam
2021	M. K. Stalin	Dravida Munnetra Kazhagam
2026	V. S. Babu	Tamilaga Vettri Kazhagam
2026 (Note: By-Election due to death of TVK MLA V. S. Babu)		

== Election results ==
Vote share of winning candidates
2026	45.09%
2021	60.86%
2016	54.25%
2011	48.35%

=== 2026 By-election ===
2026 Tamil Nadu Legislative Assembly Bye-election: Kolathur
Party	Candidate	Votes	%	±%
TVK				
DMK				
AIADMK				
NTK				
Others	Other party candidates			
Independent	Independent candidates			
NOTA	None of the above			
Margin of victory				
Turnout				
Registered electors				
gain from		Swing		

=== 2026 ===
2026 Tamil Nadu Legislative Assembly election: Kolathur
Party	Candidate	Votes	%	±%
TVK	V. S. Babu	82,997	45.09	New
DMK	M. K. Stalin	74,202	40.32	▼20.54
AIADMK	P. Santhana Krishnan	18,430	10.01	▼10.26
NTK	A. Soundarapandian Loutherseth	5,046	2.74	▼3.78
NOTA	None of the above	892	0.48	▼0.40
Margin of victory		8,795	4.78	▼35.81
Turnout		1,84,051		
Rejected ballots				
Registered electors				
TVK gain from DMK		Swing		

=== 2021 ===
2021 Tamil Nadu Legislative Assembly election: Kolathur
Party	Candidate	Votes	%	±%
DMK	M. K. Stalin	105,522	60.86	6.61
AIADMK	Aadi Rajaram	35,138	20.27	−11.56
MNM	A. Jagadish Kumar	14,210	8.20	
NTK	Camilus Selva	11,304	6.52	4.84
NOTA	Nota	1,529	0.88	−1.23
BSP	M. J. S. Jamal Mohamed Meera	1,295	0.75	0.49
AMMK	J. Arumugam	1,081	0.62	
Margin of victory		70,384	40.59	18.18
Turnout		173,388	61.68	−3.10
Rejected ballots		373	0.22	
Registered electors		281,128		
DMK hold		Swing	6.61	

=== 2016 ===
2016 Tamil Nadu Legislative Assembly election: Kolathur
Party	Candidate	Votes	%	±%
DMK	M. K. Stalin	91,303	54.25	▲5.89
AIADMK	J. C. D. Prabhakar	53,573	31.83	▼14.60
DMDK	P. Mathivanan	6,276	3.73	
BJP	K. T. Raghavan	5,289	3.14	
NOTA	None Of The Above	3,554	2.11	
PMK	S. Gopal	3,022	1.80	
NTK	S. Xavier Felix	2,827	1.68	
Margin of victory		37,730	22.42	20.49
Turnout		168,308	64.77	−3.50
Registered electors		259,843		
DMK hold		Swing	5.89	

=== 2011 ===
2011 Tamil Nadu Legislative Assembly election: Kolathur
Party	Candidate	Votes	%	±%
DMK	M. K. Stalin	68,677	48.35	
AIADMK	Saidai Duraisamy	65,943	46.43	
BSP	K. Armstrong	4,004	2.82	
Margin of victory		2,734	1.92	
Turnout		208,018	68.28	
Registered electors		142,028		
DMK win (new seat)				
