= Moolakadai =

Neighbourhood in Chennai, Tamil Nadu, India

Moolakadai மூலக்கடை
- Neighbourhood
- Location in Chennai Location in Tamil Nadu Location in India
- Coordinates: 13.128937°N 80.241453°E
- Country: India
- State: Tamil Nadu
- District: Chennai district
- City: Chennai

Languages
  - Official: Tamil
- Time zone: UTC+5:30 (Indian Standard Time)
- PIN: 600060
- Vehicle registration: TN-05

Moolakadai (also spelt Moolakkadai; Tamil: மூலக்கடை) is a neighbourhood in northern Chennai, Tamil Nadu, India. Located at the intersection of Grand Northern Trunk Road and Madhavaram High Road, it is described as the "gateway of North Chennai". The junction connects Grand Northern Trunk Road, part of the Chennai–Kolkata highway corridor, with Madhavaram High Road. A flyover at the junction was opened in November 2015 to improve traffic movement through the area.

== Geography ==
Moolakadai is situated in northern Chennai, around the junction of Grand Northern Trunk Road and Madhavaram High Road. The surrounding urban area includes Madhavaram, Madhavaram Milk Colony, Kodungaiyur, Vyasarpadi and Sembium.

== Transport ==
=== Road ===
Moolakadai Junction connects Grand Northern Trunk Road, also known as GNT Road, with Madhavaram High Road. The junction provides a road connection between several neighbourhoods in northern Chennai.

The Moolakadai flyover was inaugurated by Tamil Nadu Chief Minister J. Jayalalithaa on 13 November 2015, along with two other flyovers in Chennai. The project cost approximately ₹49.55 crore. Construction was delayed by land acquisition and the relocation of utilities.

A 2015 traffic-engineering study recorded a peak evening traffic volume of 9,556 passenger-car equivalents between 6 pm and 7 pm at the Moolakadai intersection. The study estimated the intersection's design capacity at 5,400 passenger-car equivalents and calculated an average volume-to-capacity ratio of 1.76, indicating severe congestion during the survey period.

Heavy-vehicle movements, roadside encroachment and unauthorised parking were identified as factors affecting traffic flow. The study examined traffic-management measures, including diverting selected vehicle movements to nearby streets and improving the use of available road space.

=== Bus services ===
The area is served by the Metropolitan Transport Corporation (MTC), which operates city bus services connecting northern Chennai with other parts of the city. Current route information is available through the corporation's official website.

=== Chennai Metro ===
Moolakadai metro station is a planned station on Corridor 3 of the Chennai Metro Phase II project, which is planned to connect Madhavaram with SIPCOT. CMRL lists Moolakadai among the stations in the Phase II network and has published awarded contracts for underground station construction in the area.

In May 2026, the tunnel-boring machine Servarayan completed an 824.6-metre tunnel drive from Madhavaram Highway station towards Moolakadai station. The tunnel passes beneath the Buckingham Canal and existing roads.

== Healthcare ==
Healthcare facilities listed in the Moolakadai area include:

- KVT Health Centre – located at 16, Grand Northern Trunk Road, in the Moolakadai area of Chennai.
- NRV Hospital – located in the Moolakadai area, with an address on Kamarajar Salai in Kodungaiyur.

== Prominent structures ==
- Moolakadai Junction – a major road junction where Grand Northern Trunk Road and Madhavaram High Road meet. A flyover was opened here in November 2015.
- St Sebastian's Church – a Catholic church on Madhavaram High Road. The local parish was established in 1942, and its administration was transferred to Franciscan friars in 1953. The present church was blessed in December 1988. The church is located at 151, Madhavaram High Road, Chennai.
- Navin's Whiteberry – a residential apartment development on Madhavaram High Road in the Moolakadai area.

== See also ==
- Moolakadai Junction
- Chennai
- Chennai Metro
