= Kodungaiyur =

- neighbourhood
- Location within Chennai Location within Tamil Nadu Location within India
- Coordinates: 13.140961°N 80.248175°E
- Country: India
- State: Tamil Nadu
- District: Chennai
- Metro: Chennai
- Chennai Corporation Zone: IV (Tondiarpet)
- Taluk: Chennai city - Perambur

Languages
  - Official: Tamil
- Time zone: UTC+5:30 (IST)
- PIN: 600118
- Vehicle registration: TN-05-xxxx
- Lok Sabha constituency: Chennai North
- Vidhan Sabha constituency: Perambur/RK Nagar

Kodungaiyur is a residential neighbourhood in the northern part of the city of Chennai, Tamil Nadu, India. It comes under Perambur Taluk of the Chennai District.

It borders Manali to the north, Korukkupet to the east, Madhavaram Milk Colony and Madhavaram to the west, Perambur to the southwest and MKB Nagar (Vysarpadi) to the south.

It also has a 350 acre solid waste dumpyard. In June 2025, the citizens have protested against the proposed waste to energy plant in the area.
