= Villivakkam =

- Neighbourhood
- Villivakkam(Chennai) Villivakkam (Tamil Nadu) Villivakkam (India)
- Coordinates: 13.1101°N 80.2095°E
- Country: India
- State: Tamil Nadu
- District: Chennai
- Metro: Chennai

Government
  - Member Of Legislative Assembly: Aadhav Arjuna
- Elevation: 13 m (43 ft)

Languages
  - Official: Tamil
- Time zone: UTC+5:30 (IST)
- PIN: 600 049
- Telephone code: 2617
- Vehicle registration: TN 02 (RTO, Chennai North West)

Villivakkam is a neighbourhood of Chennai, Tamil Nadu, India. It is served by the Villivakkam railway station on the Chennai Central–Arakkonam suburban section.

== Transport ==
Villivakkam has a bus terminus off Konnur High Road. The Villivakkam Subway was started on 4 December 2007 and was inaugurated on 19 June 2012.

=== Rail ===
Chennai suburban railway has a station at Villivakkam.
