= Periyar Nagar =

- Neighbourhood
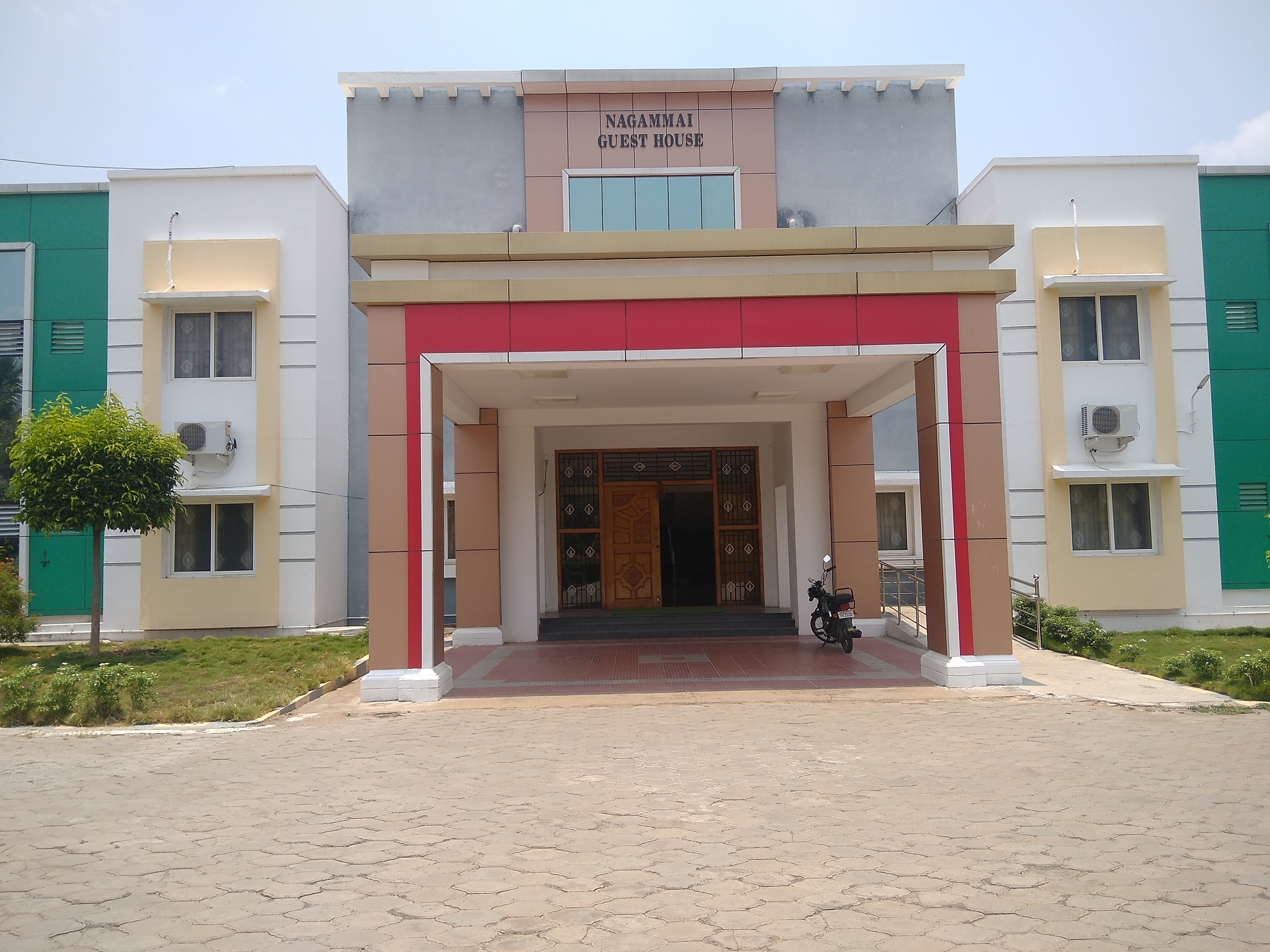

- Location within Chennai Location within Tamil Nadu Location within India
- Coordinates: 13.115540°N 80.223432°E
- Country: India
- State: Tamil Nadu
- District: Chennai
- Metro: Chennai
- Elevation: 5 m (16 ft)

Languages
  - Official: Tamil
- Time zone: UTC+5:30 (IST)
- PIN: 600082
- Telephone code: 044
- Vehicle registration: TN05
- Planning agency: CMDA
- City: Chennai
- Vidhan Sabha constituency: Kolathur
- Lok Sabha constituency: Chennai North
- Civic agency: Chennai Corporation

Periyar Nagar, is a developed residential area in North Chennai, a metropolitan city, which is developed in short time in Tamil Nadu, India.

== Location ==
Periyar Nagar is located near Kolathur, Ayanavaram, Villivakkam and Perambur. It is well connected by train and bus transports. It is very close to Perambur Loco Works railway station.

== Hospitals ==
Government Peripheral Hospital, Cure Advanced Dental Care, Dr. Agarwals Eye Hospital, Eswari Nursing Home, Sheeba Nursing Home and KKR Ent Clinic are some of the medical facilities available in and around Periyar Nagar.

== Library ==
There is a public library situated at Periyar Nagar.
