= Perambur Carriage Works railway station =

Railway station in Chennai, India

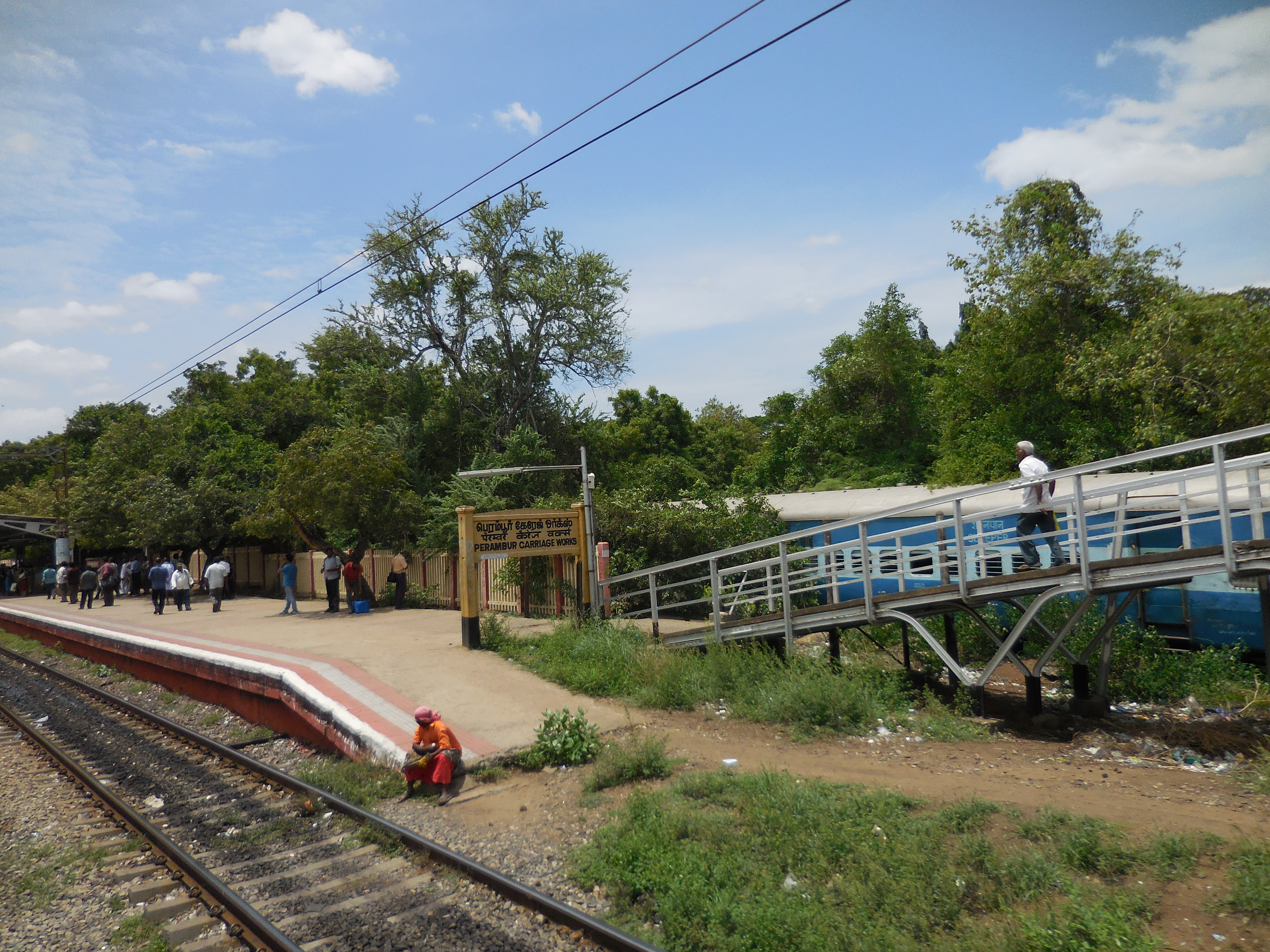
- Perambur Carriage Works railway station

General information
- Coordinates: 13.107300°N 80.238900°E
- System: Indian Railways and Chennai Suburban Railway station
- Platforms: 3
- Tracks: 4

Construction
- Structure type: Standard on-ground station
- Parking: Available

Other information
- Station code: PCW
- Fare zone: Southern Railways

History
- Electrified: 29 November 1979
- Former names: Madras and Southern Mahratta Railway

Services
Preceding station	Chennai Suburban	Following station
Perambur Loco Works towards Arakkonam Junction	West Line	Perambur towards Chennai Central MMC
Route map
Chennai Central MMC — Jolarpet
Location

Perambur Carriage Works railway station is a suburban railway station less than a kilometre from the Perambur railway station in Chennai, Tamil Nadu, India. The station has an elevation of 7.16 m above sea level. Mainly POH and IOH of all type of passenger coaches are undertaken here. The railway department has many facilities around this station, including a school (Railway Mixed Higher Secondary School), and an indoor sporting facility (Railway Stadium).

== History ==
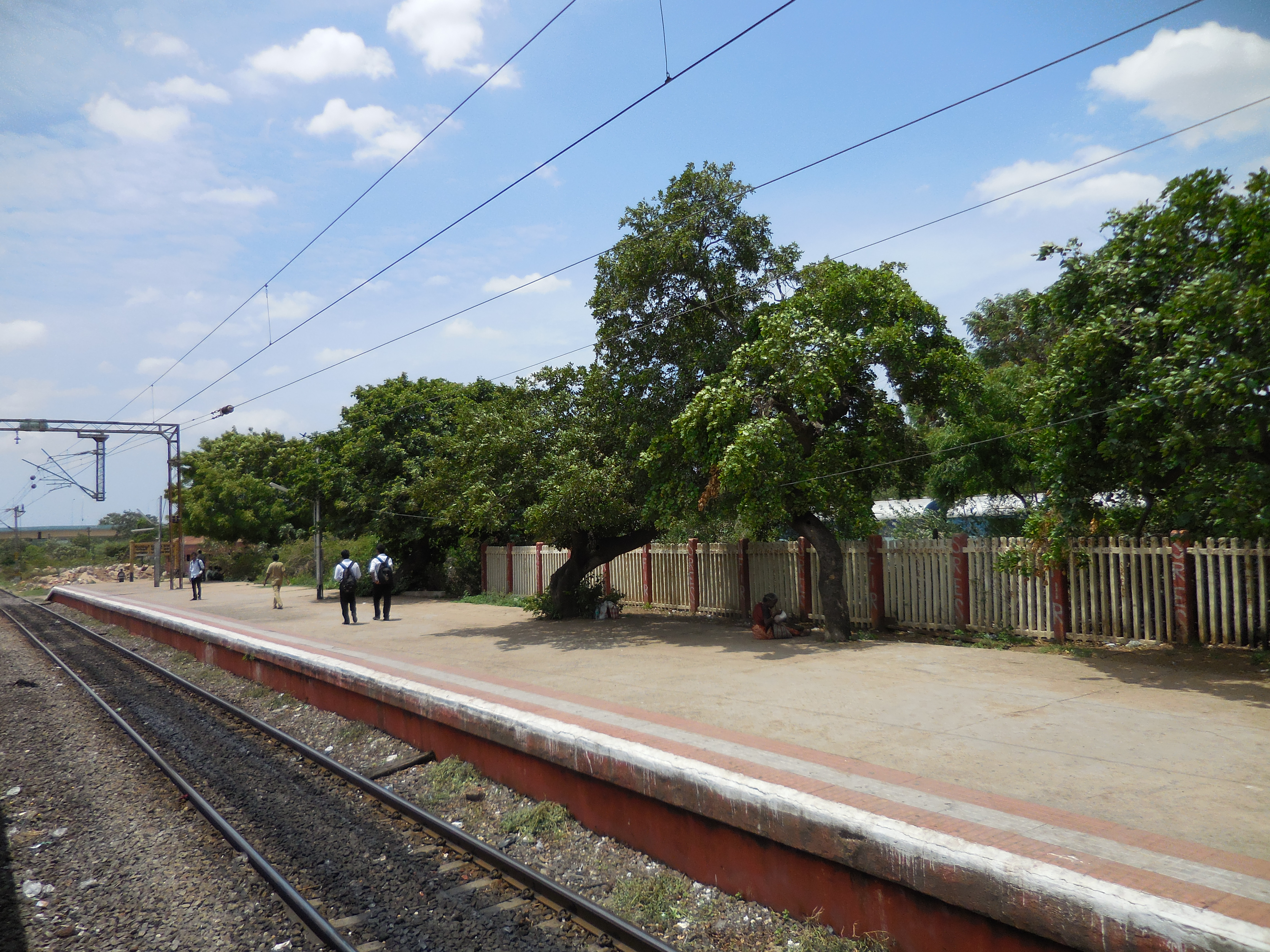
A view of the station towards east

Perambur Carriage Works is one of the three railway workshops serving Indian Railways' Southern Railway zone (the other two being the Perambur Loco Works in Chennai and the Golden Rock Railway Workshop at Tiruchi). Perambur region, which has been a part of the Chennai city since the mid-18th century, is home to the Southern Railway's workshop, which was established in 1856 to serve the erstwhile Madras and Southern Mahratta Railway Company. A combined locomotive, carriage and wagon POH, and coach-building workshop, it was bifurcated, in 1932, to deal with carriage and wagon POH activity only, shifting the locomotive overhaul activity to the new Loco workshop built adjacent to the original workshop. Perambur Carriage Works station was built along with the Perambur Loco Works station to serve these two workshops. The workshops, along with other assets, came under the Southern Railway with its formation in 1951, integrating the erstwhile South Indian Railway Company (Madras), the Southern Mahratta Railway Company, and Mysore State Railway.

The lines at the station were electrified on 29 November 1979, with the electrification of the Chennai Central–Tiruvallur section.

== Developments ==
Perambur Carriage Works is one of the railway stations in the Chennai Suburban Railway network that are being developed as Adarsh stations.

== See also ==
- Chennai Suburban Railway
- Integral Coach Factory
- Regional Railway Museum
- Railway stations in Chennai
