= Sirugavoor =

Sirugavoor சிறுகாவூர் Sirugavur
- Suburb
- Location within Chennai Location within Tamil Nadu Location within India
- Coordinates: 13.20572°N 80.21670°E
- Country: India
- State: Tamil Nadu
- District: Tiruvallur
- Taluk: Ponneri
- Metro: Chennai
- Elevation: 18 m (59 ft)

Population (2011)
  - Total: 99

Languages
  - Official: Tamil
- Time zone: UTC+5:30 (IST)
- PIN: 600067
- Telephone code: 044-xxxx
- Vehicle registration: TN-18-xxxx & TN-20-xxxx(old)
- Planning agency: CMDA
- City: Chennai
- Lok Sabha constituency: Thiruvallur
- Vidhan Sabha constituency: Ponneri

Sirugavoor (Tamil: சிறுகாவூர்), is a suburb located North of Chennai, a metropolitan city in Tamil Nadu, India.

== Location ==
Sirugavoor is located in between Madhavaram, Red Hills, Minjur and Gnayiru in North of Chennai. The arterial road in Sirugavoor is Madhavaram - Arumandai Road.
