= Perungavoor =

Perungavoor பெருங்காவூர் Perungavur
- Suburb
- Location within Chennai Location within Tamil Nadu Location within India
- Coordinates: 13.21685°N 80.21943°E
- Country: India
- State: Tamil Nadu
- District: Tiruvallur
- Taluk: Ponneri
- Metro: Chennai
- Elevation: 18 m (59 ft)

Population
  - Total: 2,277

Languages
  - Official: Tamil
- Time zone: UTC+5:30 (IST)
- PIN: 600067
- Telephone code: 044-xxxx
- Vehicle registration: TN-18-xxxx & TN-20-xxxx(old)
- Planning agency: CMDA
- City: Chennai
- Lok Sabha constituency: Thiruvallur
- Vidhan Sabha constituency: Ponneri

Perungavoor (Tamil: பெருங்காவூர்), is a suburb located North of Chennai, a metropolitan city in Tamil Nadu, India.

== Location ==
Perungavoor is located in between Madhavaram, Red Hills, Minjur and Gnayiru in North of Chennai. The arterial road in Perungavoor is Madhavaram - Arumandai Road.

Chennai Metropolitan Development Authority (CMDA) Proposed Rights Of Way And Set Back Lines For Major Network Of Roads And Announced The Second Master Plan For Chennai Metropolitan Area

As Per Chennai Metropolitan Development Authority (CMDA) Annexure Xxvi Perungavur In List Of The Chennai Corporation Division Of Thiruvallur District, Ponneri Taluk In Chennai Metropolitan Area.

- Government Middle School, Infant Jesus Matriculation Higher Secondary School, Jaigopal Garodia Matriculation School, G.R.T Mahalakshmi Vivekananda Vidyalaya Junior College, Redhills Sriram School, Don Bosco Matric Higher Secondary School.

List of Colleges Near Perungavur,

- Redhills RB Gothi Jain College for Women, Puzhal Sri Nallalaghu Nadar Polytechnic College, Tamil Nadu Horticulture Institute, Velammal Engineering College, Tamil Nadu Veterinary and Animal Sciences University, CPCL Polytechnic College, Thiruthangal Nadar Arts College.

List of Hospitals Near Perungavur,

- Yegova Clinic & Medicals, Life Care Clinic, St. Teresa Clinic, Vanaja Hospital, Sugam Hospital, St.Anthony's Hospital, KVT Speciality Hospital, Kings Hospital.

List of Parks Near Perungavur,

- Children's Park, Madhavaram Tree Park, Thirupathi Devasthanam Nagar Park, Amma Park, Madhavaram Botanical Garden, Mathur MMDA Park, Corporation Park & PlayGround.

List of Nearby Transportations,

- Madhavaram Satellite Bus Terminus, Madhavaram Bus Terminu, Vichoor Bus Stand, Manali Bus Terminal, Redhills Bus Terminal.

Upcoming Development Projects by CMDA Near Perungavur,

Madhavaram Metro : Madhavaram to Taramani underground stretch on corridor 3 to be taken up first. Chennai Metro plans to begin work on its phase II project, spanning across 118.9 km, by the middle of next year 2022. Phase II comprises three corridors —

1. Corridor 3 from Madhavaram to SIPCOT

2. Corridor 4 from Lighthouse to Poonamallee

3. Corridor 5 from Madhavaram to Sholinganallur

Of these, the 52-km stretch between Madhavaram and Taramani, a part of corridor 3, will be taken up first. It passes through areas like Purasawalkam, Sterling Road and Mylapore.
