= Thangalperumbulam =

Thangalperumbulam தாங்கல்பெரும்புலம் Thangalperumbalam
- Suburb
- Location within Tamil Nadu Location within India
- Coordinates: 13.39100°N 80.33121°E
- Country: India
- State: Tamil Nadu
- District: Tiruvallur
- Taluk: Ponneri
- Revenue block: Minjur
- Metro: Chennai
- Elevation: 4 m (13 ft)

Population (2011)
  - Total: 2,095

Languages
  - Official: Tamil
- Time zone: UTC+5:30 (IST)
- PIN: 601203
- Telephone code: 044-xxxx
- Vehicle registration: TN-18-xxxx & TN-20-xxxx(old)
- Planning agency: DTCP
- City: Chennai
- Lok Sabha constituency: Thiruvallur
- Vidhan Sabha constituency: Ponneri

Thangalperumbulam (or Thangalperumbalam; Tamil: தாங்கல்பெரும்புலம்) is a northern suburb of the metropolitan city of Chennai, Tamil Nadu, India.

== Administration ==
It is a revenue village and a part of Thangalperumbulam village panchayat in Minjur block. It is administered by Ponneri taluk of Tiruvallur district.

== Location ==
Thangalperumbulam is located in between Ennore, Pazhaverkadu and Minjur in North of Chennai. The arterial road in Thangalperumbulam is Port access road (Ennore - Pazhaverkadu road).
