= Kattur, Chennai =

Kattur
- Suburb
- Location within Tamil Nadu Location within India
- Coordinates: 13°21′17.6″N 80°17′01.7″E
- Country: India
- State: Tamil Nadu
- District: Tiruvallur
- Taluk: Ponneri
- Revenue block: Minjur
- Metro: Chennai
- Elevation: 30 m (98 ft)

Population (2011)
  - Total: 3,425

Languages
  - Official: Tamil
- Time zone: UTC+5:30 (IST)
- PIN: 601203
- Telephone code: 044-xxxx
- Vehicle registration: TN-18-xxxx & TN-20-xxxx(old)
- Planning agency: DTCP
- City: Chennai
- Lok Sabha constituency: Thiruvallur
- Vidhan Sabha constituency: Ponneri

Kattur also known as Kattoor is a suburb north of Chennai, a metropolitan city in Tamil Nadu, India.

== Administration ==
It is a revenue village and a part of Kattur village panchayat in Minjur block. It is administered by Ponneri taluk of Tiruvallur district.

== Location ==
Kattur is located in between Pazhaverkadu and Minjur in North of Chennai. The arterial road in Kattur is Minjur - Pazhaverkadu road.
