= Kattur =

Kattur may refer to the following places in India:

- Kattur, Chennai, Tamil Nadu
- Kattur, Thanjavur district, Tamil Nadu
- Kattur, Thiruvarur district, Tamil Nadu
- Kattur (Koohur), Tamil Nadu

== See also ==
- Kattoor (disambiguation)
