= Kattoor =

Kattoor may refer to these places in Kerala, India:

- Kattoor, Pathanamthitta
- Kattoor, Alappuzha
- Kattoor, Thrissur

== See also ==
- Kattur (disambiguation)
