= HFL =

HFL may refer to:

== Football leagues ==
- Highland Football League, an association football league in Scotland
- Hills Football League, an Australian rules football league in South Australia
- Hokushin'etsu Football League, an association football league in Japan
- Hume Football League, an Australian rules football in New South Wales, Australia

== Other uses ==
- Dutch guilder (Dutch: hollandse florijn), the currency of the Netherlands until 2002
- The Haredi faction in the Likud, a political faction in Israel
- Hinduja Foundries, an Indian foundry
- Honeoye Falls-Lima Central School District, in Honeoye Falls, New York, United States
- Hydrofluoric acid
- Harvard Fatigue Laboratory
