= Vilangadupakkam =

Vilangadupakkam விளாங்காடுபாக்கம்
- Suburb
- Location within Chennai Location within Tamil Nadu Location within India
- Coordinates: 13.195905°N 80.22093°E
- Country: India
- State: Tamil Nadu
- District: Tiruvallur
- Taluk: Ponneri
- Metro: Chennai
- Elevation: 18 m (59 ft)

Population
  - Total: 5,668

Languages
  - Official: Tamil
- Time zone: UTC+5:30 (IST)
- PIN: 600052
- Telephone code: 044-xxxx
- Vehicle registration: TN-18-xxxx & TN-20-xxxx(old)
- Planning agency: CMDA
- City: Chennai
- Lok Sabha constituency: Thiruvallur
- Vidhan Sabha constituency: Ponneri

Vilangadupakkam (Tamil: விளாங்காடுபாக்கம்), is a suburb located North of Chennai, a metropolitan city in Tamil Nadu, India.

== Location ==
Vilangadupakkam is located in between Madhavaram, Red Hills, Manali New Town and Gnayiru in North of Chennai. The arterial road in Vilangadupakkam is Madhavaram - Arumandai Road.
