= Arumandhai =

Village in Tiruvallur, Tamil Nadu, India

Arumandai அருமண்டை
- Village
- Interactive map of Arumandai
- Coordinates: 13.222°N 80.211°E
- Country: India
- State: Tamil Nadu
- District: Tiruvallur district
- Taluk: Ponneri taluk

Population (2011)
  - Total: 1,669

Arumandai (Tamil: அருமண்டை), also Arumandhai, is a village in Ponneri taluk in the state of Tamil Nadu, India. It has a population of 1669 as of 2011, of which 854 were male and 815 were female. 12% of the population was under the age of 6, and it had a literacy rate of 86.6%, higher than the Tamil Nadu average. It is administered by a Sarpanch.
