= Alamathi =

Village in the Indian state of Tamil Nadu

- Village
- Location in Tamil Nadu, India Alamathi (India)
- Coordinates: 13°12′40″N 80°06′40″E
- Country: India
- State: Tamil Nadu
- District: Thiruvallur district

Population (2011)
  - Total: 7,424
- Time zone: UTC+5:30 (IST)

Alamathi is a town in Thiruvallur district, in the southern Indian state of Tamil Nadu. It had a population of 7,424 people distributed in 1,894 households as of 2011. It is part of the Ponneri taluk.
