= Thyagaraja Temple, Tiruvottiyur =

Hindu temple of Shiva in Tiruvottiyur, India

Thiyagaraja Swamy Temple
- Thiruvotriyur Thiyagaraja Swamy Temple
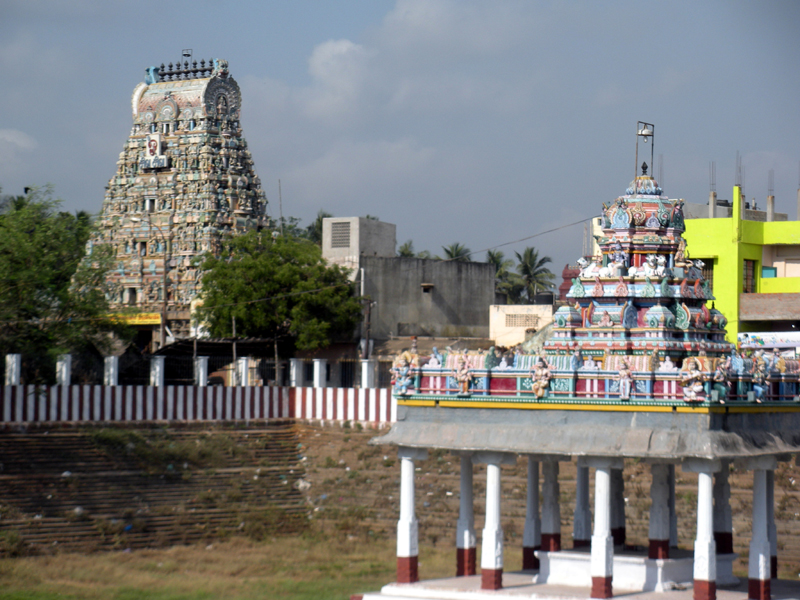

- Thyagarajar Swamy Temple, Tiruvottiyur, Chennai, Tamil Nadu

Religion
- Affiliation: Hinduism
- District: Chennai
- Deity: Thiyagaraja Swamy, Aadhipureeswarar, and Thiruvottrieswarar (Shiva) Vadivudaiamman aka Tripurasundari (parvathi)
- Festivals: Maasi Bramotsavam, Vasantha urchavam, Shivarathiri, Thai poosam, Navarathiri, Skandashashti, Aadi pooram, Arudhra darshan, Vattaparaiamman urchavam, Navarathiri and Pournami days
- Features: Temple tank: Brahma Theeertham, Adisesha Theertham

Location
- Location: Thiruvotriyur, Chennai
- State: Tamil Nadu
- Country: India
- Coordinates: 13.1609°N 80.2992°E

Architecture
- Type: Dravidian architecture
- Creator: Cholas, Pallavas
- Elevation: 60 m (197 ft)

Thyagaraja Temple (also called as Vadivudai Amman Temple) is a Hindu temple dedicated to Hindu god Shiva. It is located in Tiruvottiyur in the northern part of Chennai, Tamil Nadu, India. The temple is revered by the Tevaram hymns of Saiva nayanars, the 7th century Tamil saint poets and classified as Paadal Petra Sthalam. All the Three of Thevaram Moovar (Appar, Samandar and Sundarar) has rendered Thevaram songs in this temple. The temple is closely associated with the saint poet Sundarar and Pattinathar. The temple has been in vogue from the Pallava times of the 7th century and widely expanded by Chola kings during the 11th century. The temple has a seven tiered gateway tower, a tank, with the overall temple area covering 1 acre. The temple is administered by the Hindu Religious and Endowment Board of the Government of Tamil Nadu. The temple draws parallel with the Thygaraja temple in Tiruvarur as both the temples were expanded by Rajendra Chola I and both have the same dance poses of Shiva. The temple is one of the 51 Sakthi Peetams in the country.

The temple is also one of the Sakthi triad in the region of Tondaimandalam, the other two being the Kodiyidai Amman Temple or Masilamaniswara Temple at Thirumullaivoyal and the Thiruvudai Amman Temple or Thirumanangeeswarar Temple at Minjur.

== Legend ==
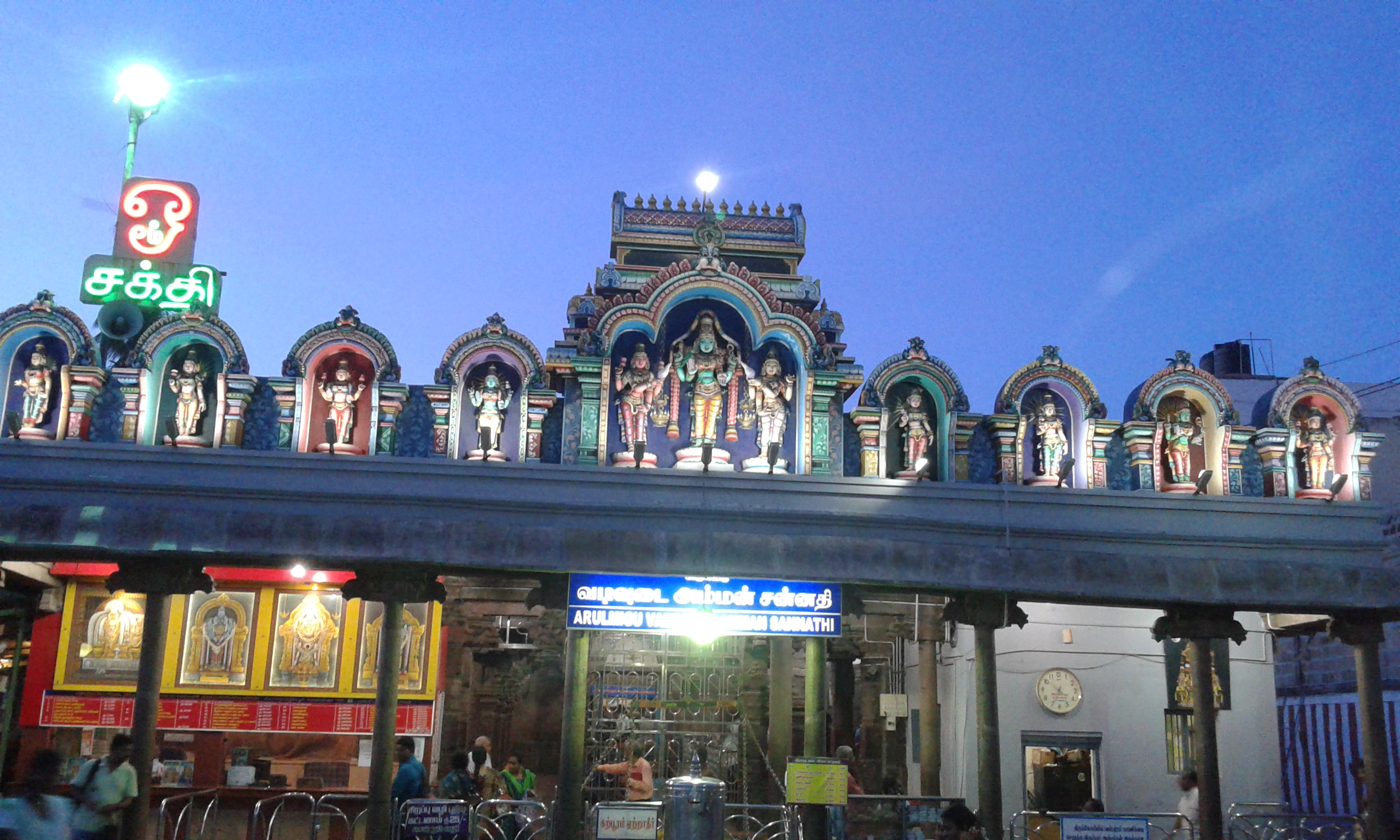
Shrine of Vadivudai Amman

Brahma is the Hindu god of creation and one of the three primary gods of Hinduism, the other two being Vishnu, god of preservation and Shiva, god of destruction . He created the Devas(Gods) and Asuras (Demons) and Daityas - both these groups fight against each other. While the antigods, called asuras use muscle power, the Gods called devas use the power of Veda, the sacred texts. Once, two asuras, Madhu and Kaithaba tricked the gods to steal the Veda, chopped it to pieces and hid it in the bottom of the sea. Vishnu fought the demons, but could not defeat them. He prayed to Shiva and Parvati and with the accomplishment, he was able to defeat the demons. He took the form of Matsya, a fish to search the Veda. The recovered Veda from the bottom of the sea was brought to the deity at this temple, who reunited and purified it. The wishing tree of gods, makizha tree, became the sacred tree of the temple.

== History ==
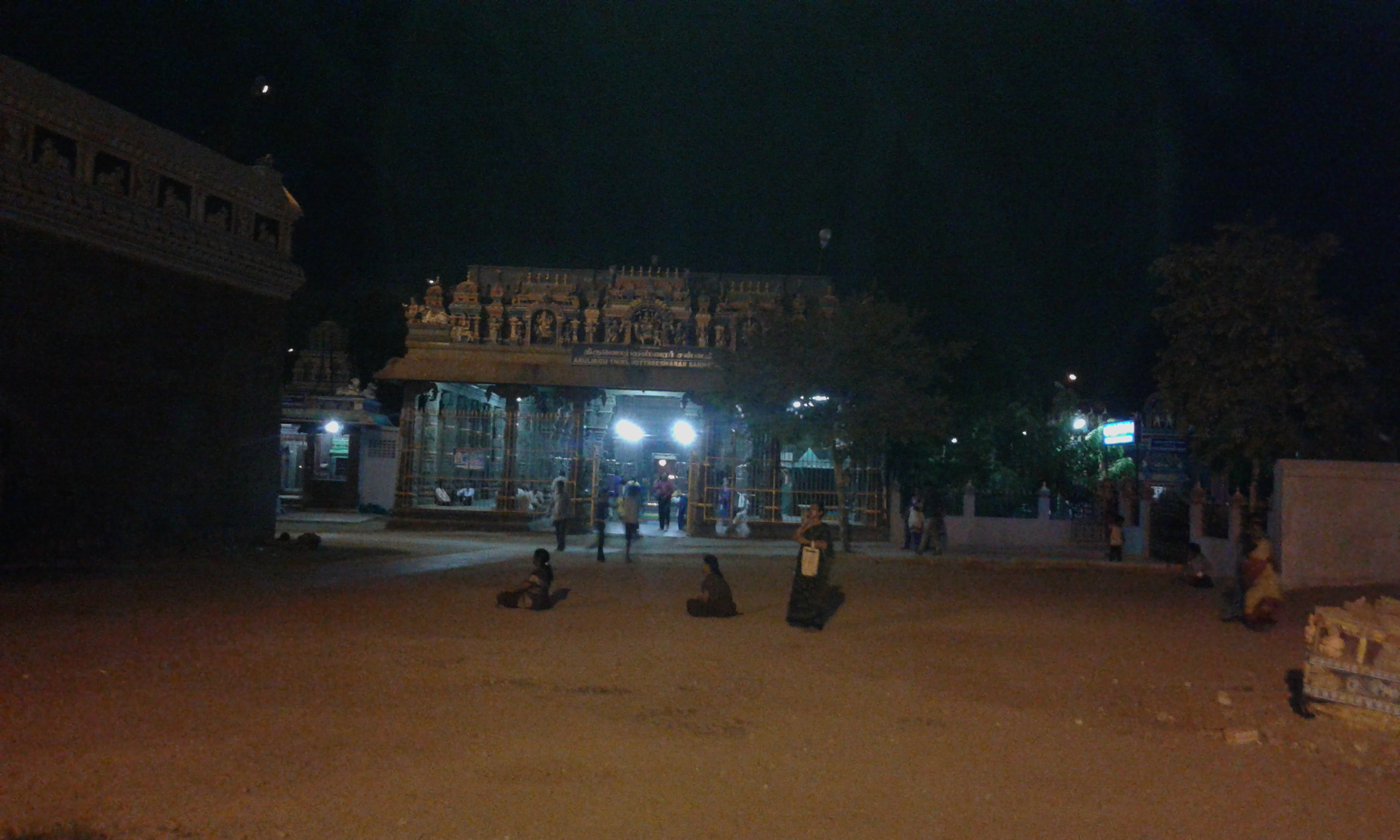
Shrine of Tiruvoteeswarar located behind the main shrine in the second prcinct

The temple was the centre of learning, with the halls inside the temple acting as venue for religious discourses in subjects like vyakarna (translation), Somasiddantha (philosophy) and Panini's grammar. There was a hermitage attached to the temple during the 9th century, presided over by Caturananas Pandithar. The temple also had philosophical discourses and expositions on grammar. There are references to recital of Prabhakara, Rudra, Yamala, Purana, Sivadharma, Panchanga and Bharata. Lands were granted to learned scholars and their generation like Vedavritti, Bhattavriti, Vaidyavritti and Archanavritti.

There are a number of inscriptions inside the temple dating back to Pallava period. Sankaracharya, the 8th century scholar in the advaita school of Hinduism is believed to have visited the temple to put down the power of evil. The temple was originally built by Pallavas and later rebuilt by Rajendra Chola I. The inscription dating 954 CE, the fifth year of the Chola king Gandaraditya indicates 90 sheep for burning lamps and ilavilaku, a lamp made in Sri Lanka). The inscriptions dating from 1046 CE reveal that 64 bronze nayanmar statues were installed in the temple. There were equal number of dancing girls called Devadasi in the temple, who were divided into two groups - the valankai dasis danced for Thyagaraja, while the idangai dasis danced for Vadivudaiamman. During the reign of the Malik Kafur, much of the temple was destroyed and the bronze idols present now in the temple were installed during the Vijayanagara period of the 15th century. A 13th-century inscription indicates the practise of animal sacrifice to the goddess, which continued along with offering intoxicating drink till the early 2000s. Famous saints like Pattinathar, Topeswamigal and Ramalinga Swamigal lived in this town and prayed Thyagaraja in this temple. This place is also home to Thiruvottiyur Thyagayyar who is a carnatic composer and poet. The temple had been a centre of learning as seen from the inscriptions in the temple. The inscriptions indicate specific subjects like Purvamimansa styled as Pravahakarma. There were also provisions made for feeding and maintaining for teachers and students.

== The Temple ==
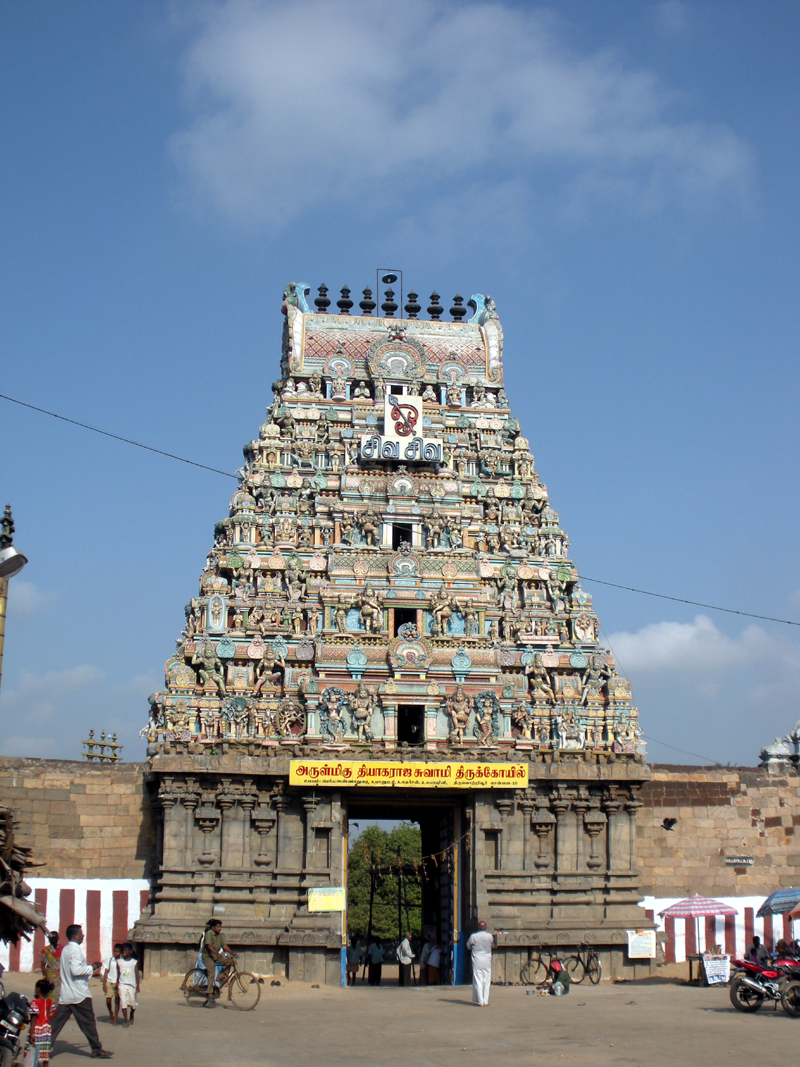
The gopuram of the temple

The presiding deity is Aadhipureeswarar is in the form of a mud mound covered by armour. On the day of the full moon of the Tamil month karthigai, the armour is removed and the representation of the god is visible to devotees. The Lord is anointed with punugu, javvadhu, and sampirani oils. There is a Durga shrine in the northern side of the temple. Inside the main temple complex, opposite the main shrine, is Nataraja shrine and in the koshta is the Ganapati shrine. The Ganapati is known as Gunalaya Ganapati (abode of bliss) and there is also the idol of Adi Shankara, just behind the main shrine inside the complex. There are also deities like Subrahmanya installed there. The Dakshinamurthy statue is in the northern Koshta facing south there is also the subcomplex shrine of Kali. Adi Shankara is said to have installed a chakra to calm down the Devi and to make her Sowmya roopi (calm and resplendent). To this day, a select group of Nampoothiri families perform the pooja and aradhana to this Lord and Goddess as desired by Adi Shankara.

The name of the goddess at this temple is Vadivudaiamman alias Tripurasundari. The goddess is housed in a separate shrine inside the Temple complex. The temple with Vadivudai Amman as its chief goddess is the third of the Sakthi temple triad in the region of the Tondaimandalam, namely, Thiruvudai Amman (also known as Ichchaa Sakthi, the goddess who fulfills devotees' wishes), Vadivudai Amman (also known as Gnaana Shakti, the goddess who blesses with gnana or knowledge), and Kodiyidai Ammam (also known as Kriya Shakti, the goddess who assists in all actions). The Kodiyidai Amman shrine is at Thirumullaivoyal while the Thiruvudai Amman shrine is at Melur (Minjur).

Other deities in the temple include Agasalingam, Thiruvotrieswarar, Thiruputheeswarar (between Vattaparaiman and Durga shrines), Kuzhandhai Eesar, Kalyana Sundarar, Jaganadhar, Annamalayar, Ramanathar, Suryan, Chandran, Nalvars, Jambukeswarar, Nagalingar, Meenakshi, Sundareswarar, Sahasralingam, Amirthakandeesar, Gowlieeswarar, and Ekapaadhar, Gunalaya Vinayagar, Aruljothi Murugan, Valar Kali. The twenty seven stars of Tamil calendar are believed to have worshipped Shiva in this temple.

The inscription park at the temple has about 20 inscriptions from the time of the Chola kings installed.

== Thyagaraja Cult ==
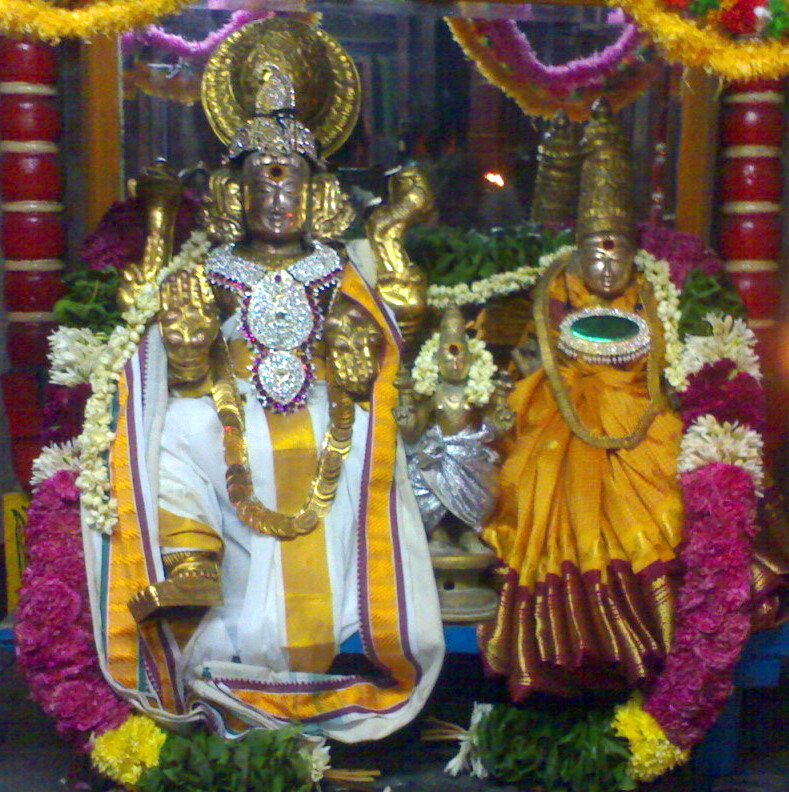
Somaskand image, associated with the Thyagaraja cult

Though the presiding deity of the temple is Adipuriswarar, the temple is closely associated with the Thyagaraja cult of Saivism. Somaskanda is the iconic form of Thyagaraja and is believed to have emerged from the 10th century, the period coinciding Raja Raja Chola. The 8th-century saint Sundarar is believed to have spread the cult from Tiruvarur to the temple here. The Lord tricked him by making him take a vow that he would never leave Tiruvottriyur, but he breaks the promise and becomes blind. The Lord of Tiruvottriyur and Tiruvarur are the same in terms of religious experience, but on the pilgrim tradition, Tiruvottriyur is affronted because Sundarar abandons and goes back to Tiruvarur. The event is celebrated every year in the temple.

The seven dance forms of Thyagaraja, the Sapthavitankam, is represented in the cultic network comprising Thyagarajar Temple in Tiruvarur, Dharbaranyeswarar Temple in Tirunallar, Kayarohanaswamy Temple in Nagapattinam, Kannayariamudayar Temple in Thirukarayil, Brahmapureeswarar Temple in Thirukkuvalai, Vaimoornaathar Temple in Tiruvaimur and Vedaranyeswarar Temple in Vedaranyam. The Tiruvottiyur temple is placed at the centre of a similar network comprising Marundeeswarar Temple in Tiruvanmiyur, Accalpuram in Sirkali and Tirukachoor near Singaperumalkoil, treated closest to the myth of Tiruvarur. Both the Tiruvarur and Tiruvottriyur temples are believed to have the same dance poses by Shiva, as asserted by Tiruvorriyurpuranam. The dance pattern of the temple is called Padamanatanam, a continuation of Tiruvarur temple - Vishnu is believed to have gone berserk and missed the dance at Tiruvarur, and Thyagaraja asked him to go to Tiruvottriyur where he said he promised to perform the same dance.

== Literary mention ==
The temple is reverred in the verses of Tevaram, the 7th century saivite canonical work by the three saint poets namely, Appar, Sundarar and Sambandar.

"வெள்ளத்தைச் சடையில் வைத்த வேதகீ தன்றன் பாதம்
மெள்ளத்தா னடைய வேண்டின் மெய்தரு ஞானத் தீயால்
கள்ளத்தைக் கழிய நின்றார் காயத்துக் கலந்து நின்று
உள்ளத்து ளொளியு மாகு மொற்றியூ ருடைய கோவே."

translating to

"People of this world!
if you want to reach the feet of the Lord who sang the Vētams and who placed the flood of the Kaṅkai on his head,
patiently listen to the way by which you can attain them.
being united in the body of those who have burnt with the help of the fire of spiritual wisdom which grants the ultimate reality, all evil thoughts.
the king of Oṟṟiyūr is the light in the hearts of such people".

The temple was the home of the Hindu saint Pattinathar and the location where he attained samadhi in the form of a lingam. It is the birthplace of Kaliya Nayanar, one of the 63 Nayanars. This temple of yore finds a definitive place in Tamil Saivite history as this is the place where the Marriage of Sree Gnanasambandar was supposed to happen but concluded in Sree Gnanasambandar being absorbed with several others into the jyothi before the marriage could be solemnised. The Carnatic composer Tyagaraja visited this temple and composed the Thiruvottiyur Pancharatna or 5 Gems in praise of the Goddess Sree Tripurasundari. Tiruvorriyur Mummanikovai is a work in praise of the deity in the temple. Tiruvorriyur Antathi is a 19th-century work by Gnanasampathavaran in praise of the deity of the temple. Tiruvorriyur Moovar Tamil is an extract of Tevaram specific to the temple. Tiruvorriyur Nadana Sarithram is a historic depiction of dance in the temple Vadivudaiampal Asiriyavirutham by Rama Mudaliar, Vadivudaiamman Kummipadal, Vadivudaiamman Navarattinam and Vadivudaiamman Panssarathinam by Kanniappa Uvattiyayar are 19th century works glorifying Vadivudaiamman, the prime consort of the primary deity of the temple.

The Nineteenth century Saint Shri Ramalinga Adigalar was a daily visitor to this temple during his younger days and has sung many poems in praise of this Lord. The other important Saint associated with this temple is Shri Topeswamy.

== Festivals ==
The prime festival is performed in the Tamil month of Masi (February–March) and historically draws large crowd. On the eighth day, an additional function called Mahiladisevai is performed. The Durgadevi shrine in the northern side of the temple is associated with Kannagi, the protagonist of Silappadikaram, a 2nd-century Tamil epic. Each year a 15-day festival is celebrated in honour of Durga Devi and on the last day, the thatch roof of the event is burnt to symbolize Kannagi burning Madurai at the end of the epic.

== Temple administration ==
During 1786 to 1831 CE, there were frequent clashes between the right-hand castes comprising handicraft people and poor and the left-hand castes comprising wealthy and parsimonious merchants. It was the practise of British administrators to bestow the office of chief administrator of the temple to rich merchants. Following the custom, Lingi Chetti headed from 1754 CE, and after his death, his family inherited the post. The right-hand caste people were highly irritated that the post was inherited by the left-hand caste. In August 1786, the left-hand caste submitted a petition to the Governor and the council of Fort St. George claiming the right-hand caste had no right over the administration of the temple and were indulged in attack of one of the left-hand person. The English sidestepped by ruling that both had liberty to perform their ceremonies according to the respective customs. It was also announced that the heads of each would be responsible for offenders. While the left-hand caste abided by the order, the right-hand caste stopped their practises. There were intermittent clashes initiated by both the parties and once resulted in attacking the sepoys involved in protection. The dissension cropped once more during 1828 when the officiating priest complained about the chief administrator. In 1831, there were renewed complaints against the chief administrator over the authority of dancing girls and his right in administering the temple stating financial irregularity. The dancing girls were immediately removed from the temple. The collector upheld the action against the dancing girls and ruled that Arunachala Chetti of the left-hand would be the rightful administrator of the temple. It also suggested to the right-hand caste that no complaints would be entertained unless specific instances were shown where the right-hand moved away from customs.

== See also ==
- Heritage structures in Chennai

== Bibliography ==
- "Fourth Thirumurai". thevaaram.org.
- Tyagi, Anil Kumar (2013). "Educational Institutions (B.C. 200- A.D. 700)". In Iyer, Shymala M. (ed.). Ancient India. New Delhi: Publications Division, Ministry of Information and Broadcasting, Government of India. ISBN 978-81-230-1896-6.
- Ayyar, P. V. Jagadisa (1991), South Indian shrines: illustrated, New Delhi: Asian Educational Services, ISBN 81-206-0151-3
- Bhargava, Gopal K.; Bhatt, Shankarlal C. (2006). Land and people of Indian states and union territories. 25. Tamil Nadu. Delhi: Kalpaz Publications. ISBN 81-7835-381-4.
- Brimnes, Niels (1999). Constructing the Colonial Encounter: Right and Left Hand Castes in Early Colonial South India. Psychology Press. ISBN 0700711066.
- C., Rasanayagam (2003), Ancient Jaffna: Being a Research Into the History of Jaffna from Very Early Times to Portuguese Period, USA: Columbia University Press, ISBN 0-231-07188-4
- Dehejia, Vidya (1990). Art of the imperial Cholas. Columbia University Press. ISBN 0-231-07188-4.
- Eisenstadt, Shmuel Noah (1984). Orthodoxy, Heterodoxy, and Dissent in India. Berlin. ISBN 3-11-009659-5.
- Ghose, Rajeshwari (1996), The Tyāgarāja cult in Tamilnāḍu: a study in conflict and accommodation, Delhi: Motilal Banarsidass Publishers Private Limited, ISBN 81-208-1391-X
- Hastings, James (2003). Selbie, John A. (ed.). Encyclopedia of Religion and Ethics, Part 21. Kessinger Publishing. ISBN 0-7661-3700-7.
- Hurd, James (2010), Temples of Tamilnad, USA: Xilbris Corporation, ISBN 978-1-4134-3843-7.
- Imperial Gazetteer of India:Volume 17 (1908). Imperial Gazetteer of India:Volume 17: Provincial Series. pp. 561–562.
- Kamath, Rina (2000), Chennai, Chennai: Orient Longman Limited, ISBN 9788125013785
- Madras Tercentenary Celebration Committee (1994), The Madras Tercentenary Commemoration Volume, New Delhi: Asian Educational Services, ISBN 81-206-0537-3
- V., Meena (1974). Temples in South India (1st ed.). Kanniyakumari: Harikumar Arts.
- Mukund, Kanakalatha (2005), The View from Below: Indigenous Society, Temples, and the Early Colonial State in Tamil Nadu 1700-1835, Hyderabad: Orient Longman Private Limited, ISBN 81-250-2800-5
- Murdoch, John (1865), Classified Catalogue of Tamil Printed Books with introductory notices, Madras: Christian Vernacular Education Society
- Rasheed, Abdur (1907), The travellers' companion: containing a brief description of places of pilgrimage and important towns in India, Calcutta: Railway Board
