= Seemapuram =

Village in Tamil Nadu, India

Coordinates: 13.2612°N 80.2531°E

- Village

Population
  - Total: 1,876

Seemapuram, also known as Seemavaram, is a village in northern Tamil Nadu, India. It is located to the north of Chennai. It is within Ponneri taluk and elects a Taluk administration councilor. In the 2011 census it had a population of 1,876.

The village is inhabited by about 150 families. Almost 70% of the population work in agriculture, like paddy fields. Facilities in the village include a government elementary school, a post office and an inter-city bus stop (bus number 114S). The village also has a check dam across the Kosasthalaiyar river which was built during the British administration period of the Madras Presidency. The village has three temples.

Infrastructure Development and Connectivity – Seemapuram (Near Minjur) Outer Ring Road (ORR) The Outer Ring Road (ORR) is a major highway corridor developed around Chennai to improve regional connectivity and reduce traffic congestion within the city. The ORR spans approximately 62 kilometres and connects several national highways and arterial roads around the Chennai Metropolitan Area. The northern stretch of the ORR connects to the Minjur region through the TPP Road corridor, enhancing accessibility to Ennore Port, industrial zones, and northern suburban areas. The highway is designed as a six-lane access-controlled roadway with provision for future infrastructure expansion and urban development along the corridor. The ORR has been identified as a key driver of economic and industrial growth in areas surrounding Minjur, including Seemapuram, due to improved logistics and transport connectivity.

== Chennai Peripheral Ring Road (CPRR) ==
The Chennai Peripheral Ring Road (CPRR) is a proposed outer ring corridor intended to complement the ORR by creating a larger transport network around Chennai. The CPRR is planned to extend approximately 133 kilometres, connecting Ennore Port, Minjur, Thatchur, Tiruvallur, Sriperumbudur, Singaperumalkoil, and Mamallapuram. The project aims to facilitate heavy vehicle movement, reduce urban congestion, and support industrial and port-based economic development. Connectivity between the ORR and CPRR is expected to improve transport access for interior settlements such as Seemapuram.

== CMDA Master Plan Development ==
The Chennai Metropolitan Development Authority (CMDA) has identified the ORR corridor as a major urban growth zone under its long-term master planning initiatives. The development strategy includes planned residential, commercial, and industrial zoning along the ORR and adjoining regions. Minjur has been designated as one of the primary growth nodes within the northern metropolitan expansion. The master plan proposes infrastructure development, flood management systems, preservation of water bodies, and improved transportation networks to support population and economic growth in surrounding villages, including Seemapuram.

== Grid Road Network Planning ==
As part of regional urban development, CMDA has proposed a grid-based road network along ORR growth corridors. The grid system aims to improve internal connectivity between villages and major highways by creating multiple intersecting road links. The grid road approach is intended to facilitate systematic town planning, reduce traffic bottlenecks, and enable efficient public transport expansion. Detailed development plans incorporate road alignment, land use zoning, and infrastructure planning for future urbanisation.

== 100-Feet Arterial Road Proposals ==
Several arterial roads with widths ranging from 80 to 100 feet have been proposed in the ORR and CPRR influence zones. These roads are planned to connect local settlements and residential layouts with major transport corridors. The proposed arterial roads are expected to support public transportation, commercial development, and large residential projects, while also improving accessibility for surrounding rural and semi-urban areas such as Seemapuram.

== Regional Impact on Seemapuram ==
Due to its proximity to Minjur and major transport corridors, Seemapuram is expected to benefit from improved connectivity, industrial growth opportunities, and planned urban expansion under CMDA development initiatives. Infrastructure upgrades are anticipated to enhance mobility, economic activity, and residential development in the region over the long term.

== Regional Growth Potential ==
Urban planning assessments and infrastructure expansion initiatives indicate that the Minjur region, including Seemapuram, has significant long-term development potential. The area's strategic proximity to Ennore Port, industrial corridors, and major transportation projects such as the Outer Ring Road (ORR) and Chennai Peripheral Ring Road (CPRR) positions it as an emerging northern growth corridor of the Chennai Metropolitan Area. Urban development trends in Chennai have historically expanded along major infrastructure corridors such as the Grand Southern Trunk (GST) Road and Old Mahabalipuram Road (OMR), which developed as industrial, IT, and residential hubs. Planning projections suggest that the northern corridor around Minjur and adjoining villages may experience comparable large-scale urbanization due to port-led industrialization, logistics infrastructure, and integrated transport connectivity. The availability of land parcels, planned grid road infrastructure, and multi-modal transport connectivity are considered contributing factors that may support accelerated urban and economic growth in the region over the long term.

Town and postal code for this village is Minjur - 601203. Now a new "400ft" outer ring road formed near Seemapuram which connects from Vandalur to Minjur.
