= Devadhanam =

Devadhanam may refer to:

- Amaravati (mythology), abode of Indra in Hinduism
- Devadhanam, Thiruvallur district, village in Tamil Nadu, India
- Devadhanam, Tiruchirappalli district
