= Masilamaniswara Temple, Thirumullaivoyal =

Hindu temple in Tamil Nadu

Masilamaniswara Temple
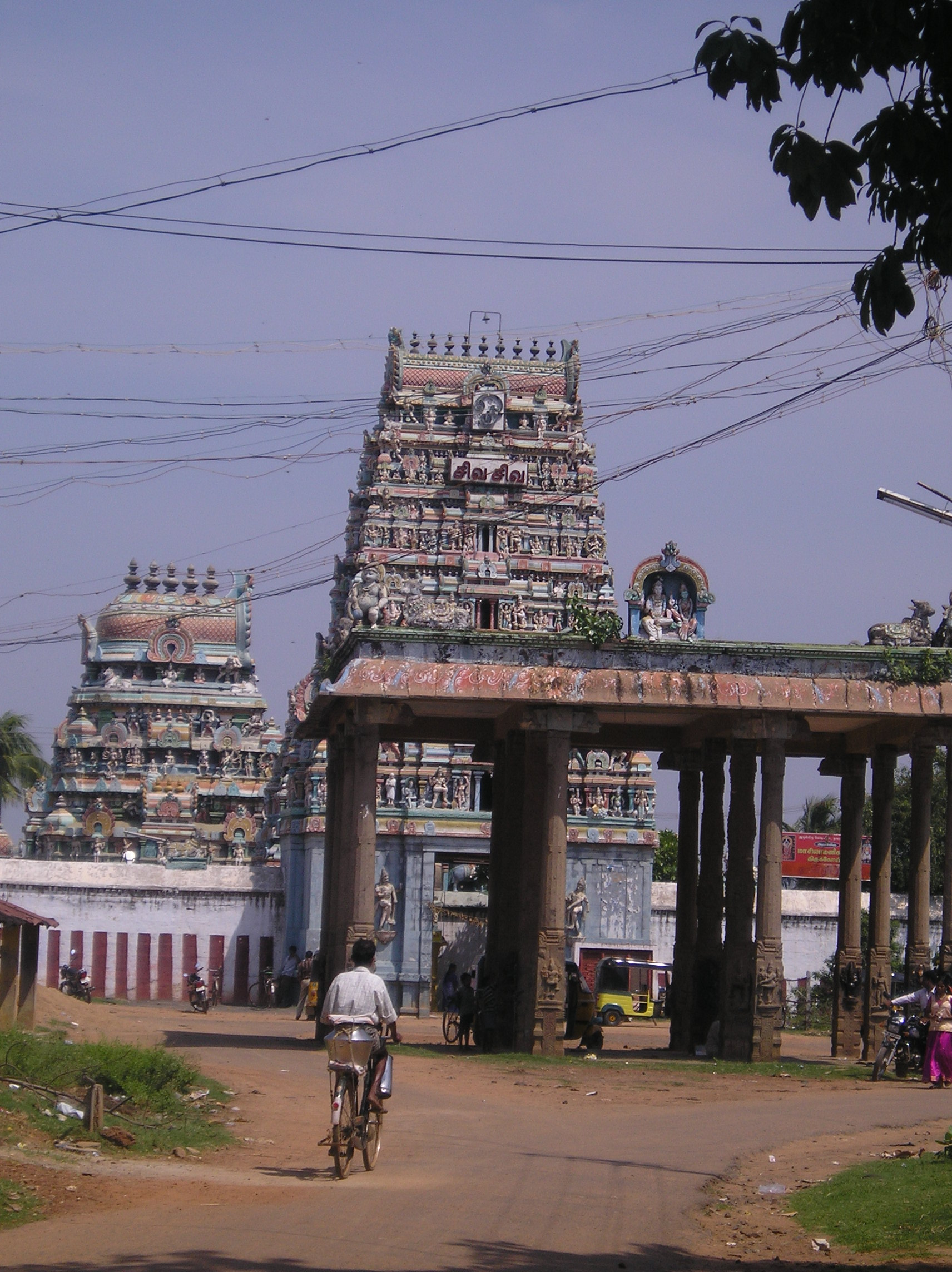

- Location in Tamil Nadu

Religion
- Affiliation: Hinduism
- District: Tiruvallur
- Deity: Masilamaninathar(Shiva) Kodiyidai Nayagi(Parvati)
- Features: Temple tank: Manasa Pushkarani; Temple tree: Mullai Kodi

Location
- Location: Thirumullaivoyal
- State: Tamil Nadu
- Country: India
- Interactive map of Masilamaniswara Temple
- Coordinates: 13.136417°N 80.132400°E

Architecture
- Type: Dravidian architecture
- Completed: 9th century CE

The Masilamaniswara Temple, Thirumullaivoyal or Masilamaniswara Temple is a Hindu temple dedicated to Shiva located in Thirumullaivoyal in the Chennai-Avadi road, India. The temple is incarnated by the hymns of Tevaram and is classified as Paadal Petra Sthalam. The temple is incarnated by the hymns of Sundarar, Ramalinga Swamigal and Arunagirinathar. His consort Parvati is depicted as Piraisoodi Amman. The presiding deity is revered in the 7th-century Tamil Shaiva canonical work, the Tevaram, written by Tamil saint poets known as the nayanars and classified as Paadal Petra Sthalam.

The temple is believed to have been built by Cholas during 9th century CE and with significant additions from later Chola kings and by the subsequent ruling empires. It houses five-tiered gateway towers known as gopurams. The temple has numerous shrines, with those of Masilamaniswarar and Kodiyidai Nayagi Amman being the most prominent. The temple has six daily rituals at various times from 6:30 a.m. to 8:30 p.m., and four yearly festivals on its calendar.

The temple is one of the Sakthi triad in the region of Tondaimandalam, the other two being the Vadivudai Amman Temple at Tiruvottiyur and the Thiruvudai Amman Temple at Minjur.

== Legend ==
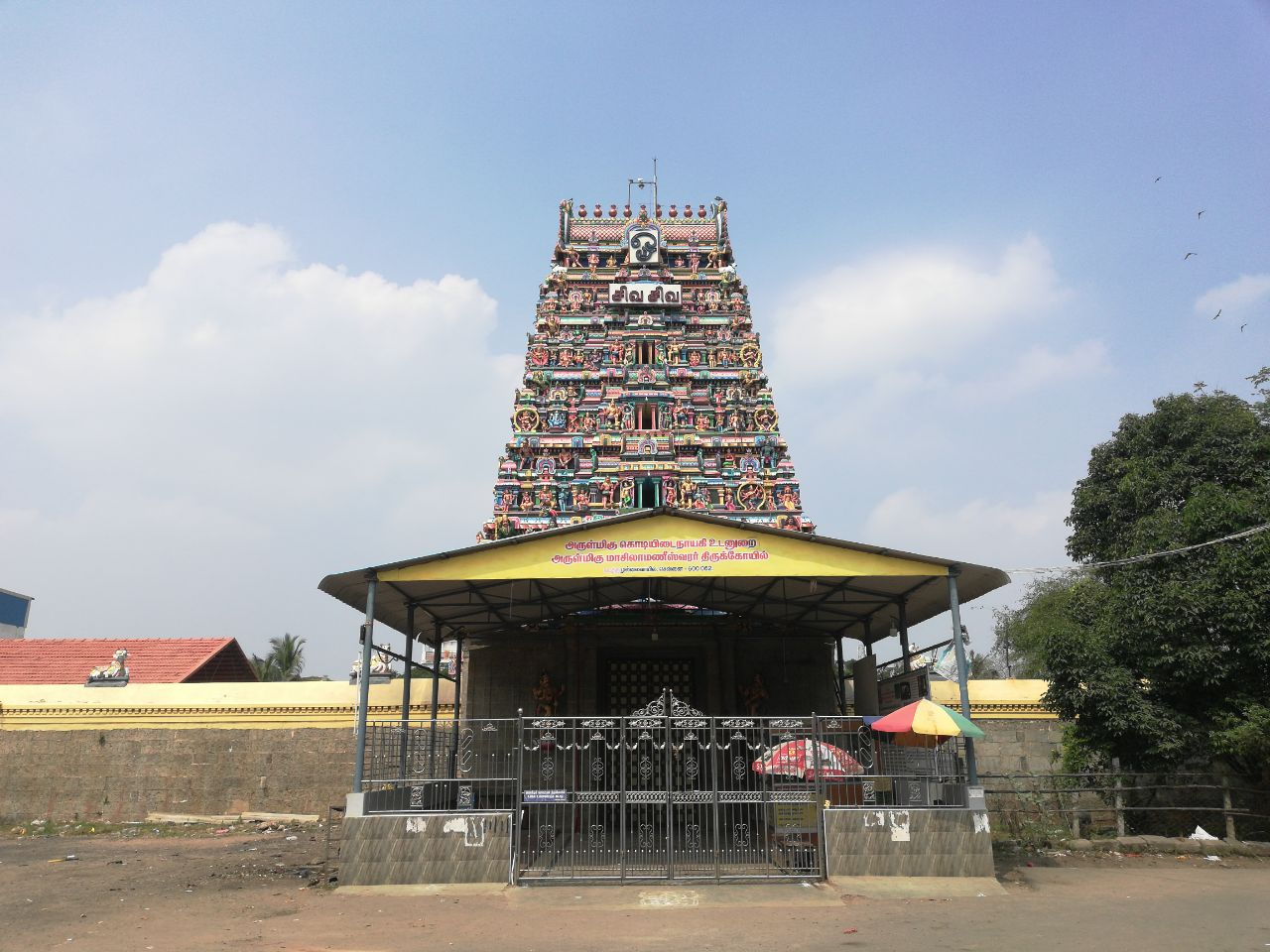
Main Entrance of the Thirumullaivoyal Masilamaniswara Temple

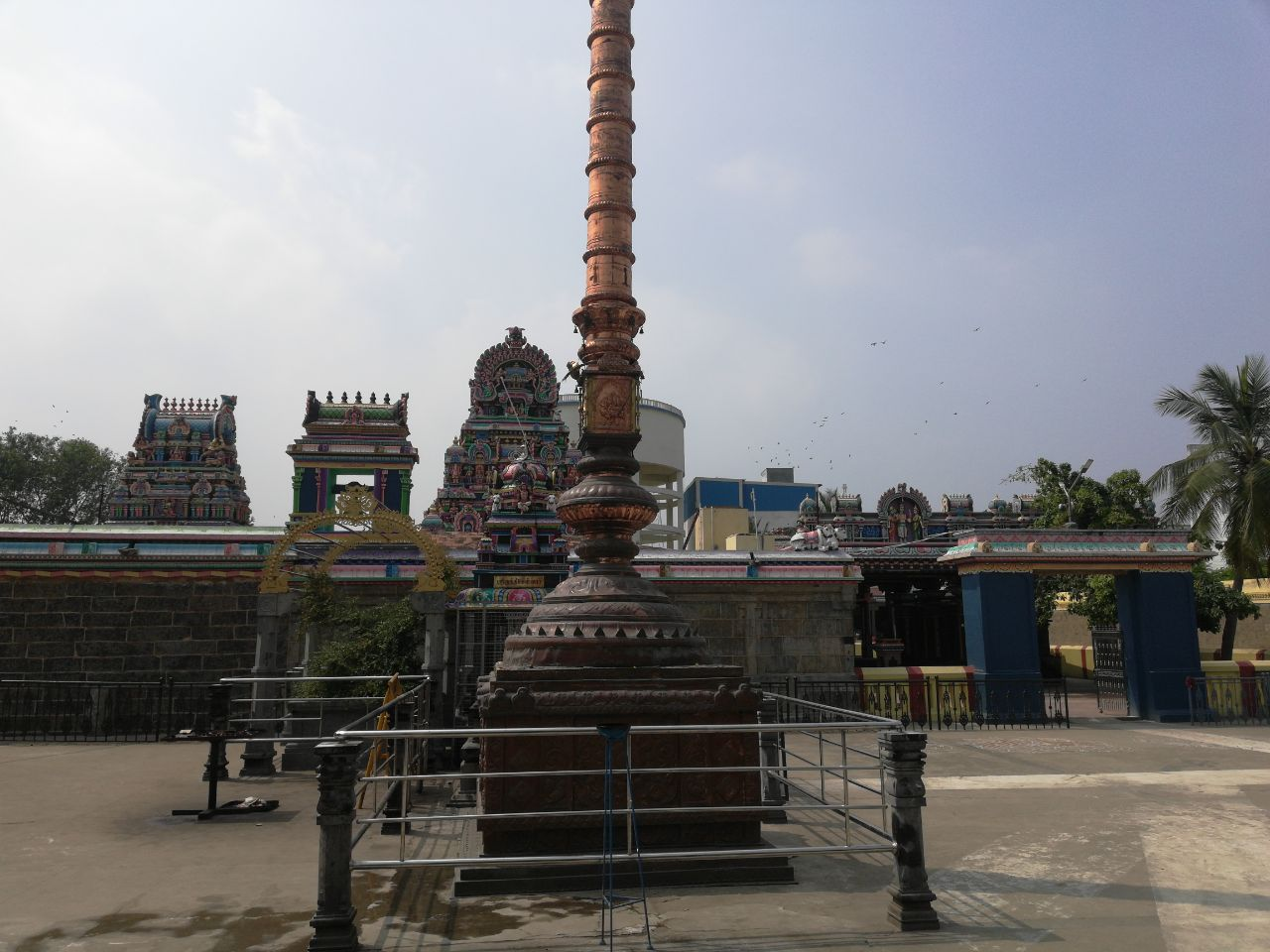
Dwajasthambham (mast) on the eastern side of the temple

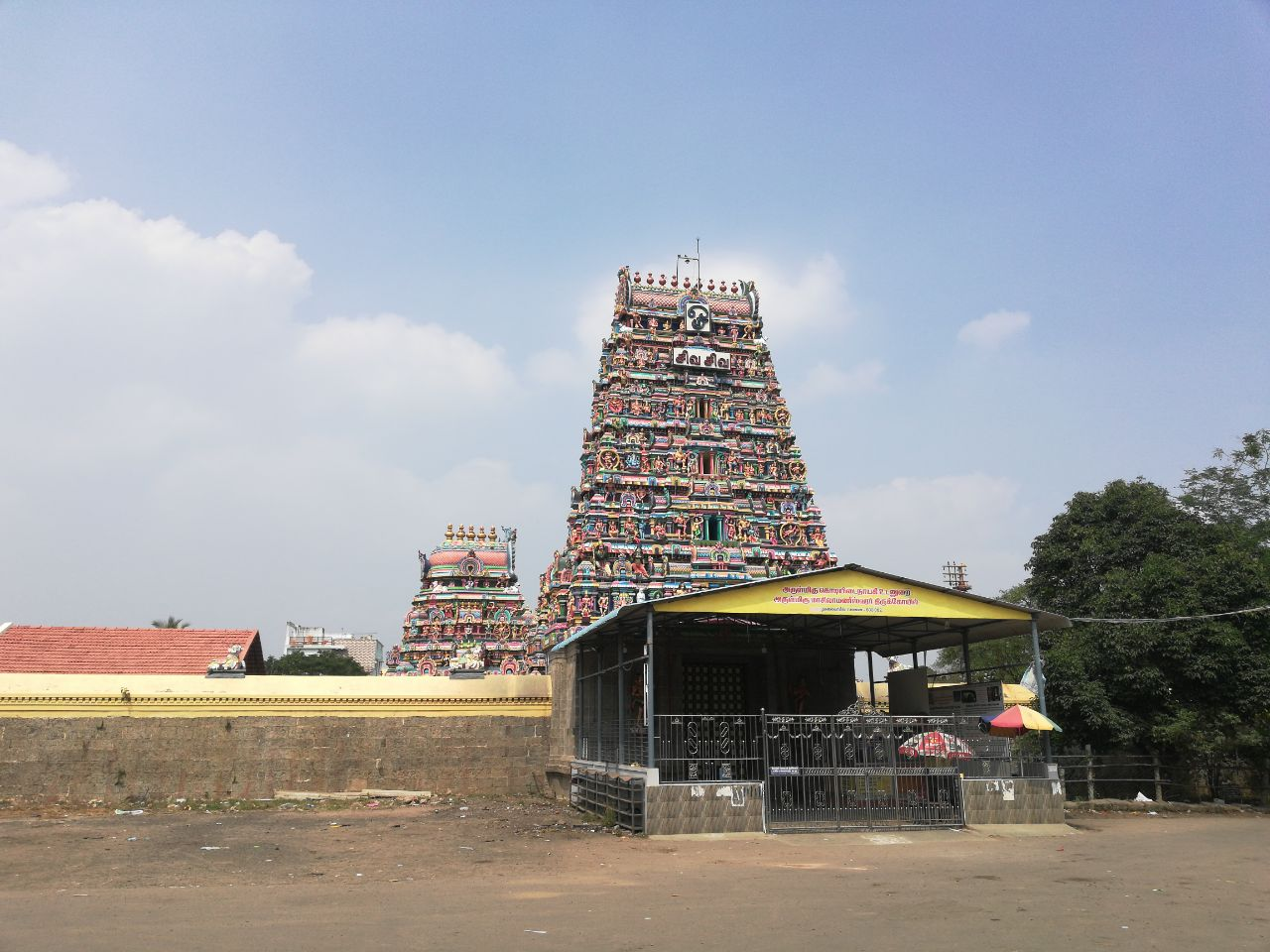
Slant view of the main entrance

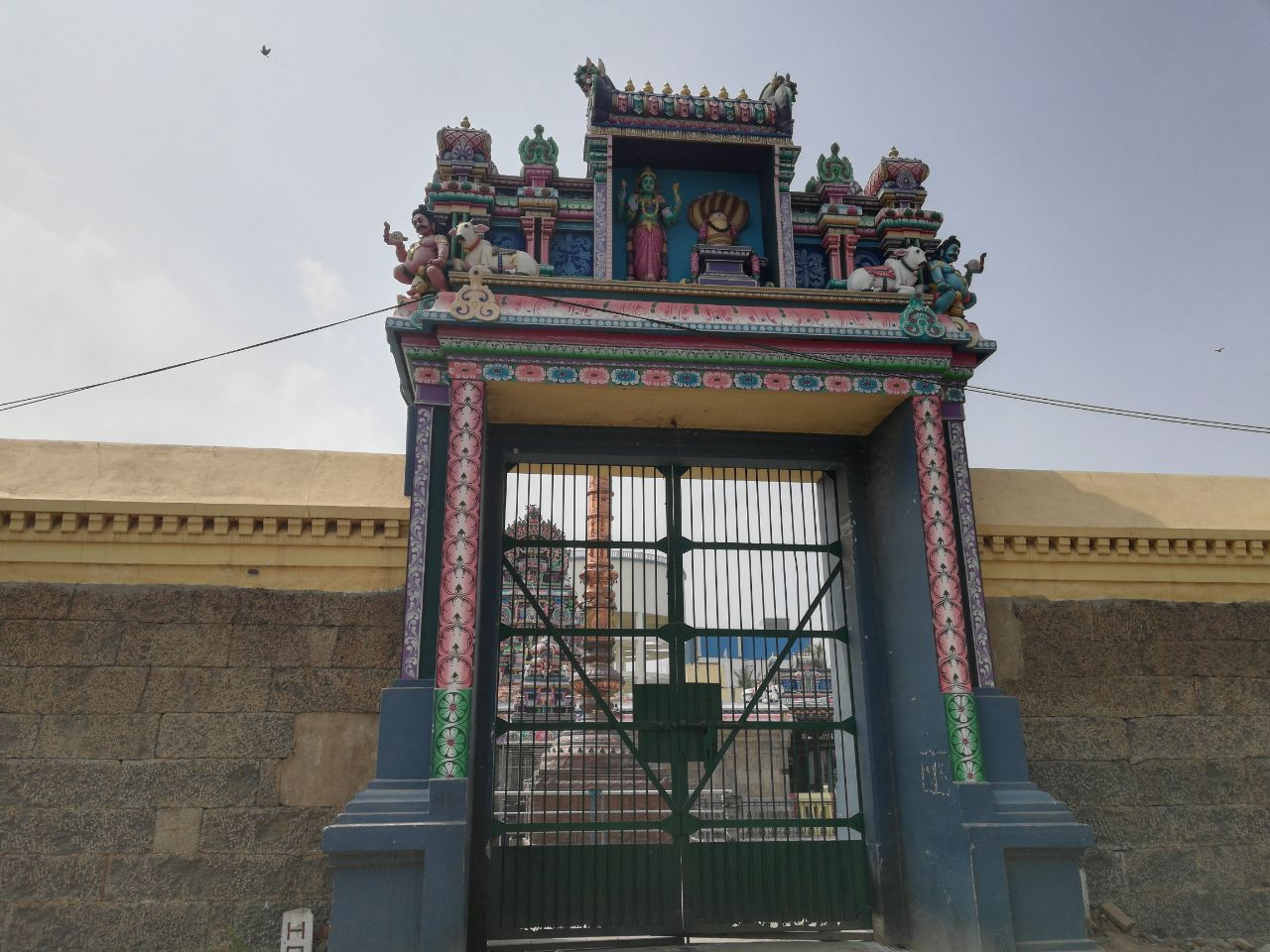
Eastern entrance

In ancient times, the forest surrounding Tirumullaivayil was ruled by two notorious tribesmen, Vaanan and Onan from the Kurumbar tribe. they are feudal lords of thirumullaivayil. King Thondaiman wanted to the area under his control . All his attempts went futile and finally he decided to defeat them in war. He set out for the war with all his infantry and cavalry with elephants and chariots. En route to the war, they waded through a dense growth of Mullai plants (Jasmine climbers). The foot of the elephant on which he was mounted was entangled in the dense foliage. The king and his men, in an attempt to free the elephant from this mess, went on to cut the wild twines with their swords and daggers. Suddenly they noticed blood gushing out from the leaves and found a 'lingam' bleeding. Shocked, the king was in great distress that he has committed a sin. Seeking mercy and forgiveness from Shiva, he prayed to him. Without any delay Shiva and Parvati appeared before the king lest he indulge in causing self-inflicted injury out of grief. Shiva asked the King to build a temple for him right there and promised that he would reside there as Masilamaniswara, Shiva who is as precious as a gem, but without stains ['maasu' - dirty or stain (caused by the profuse bleeding), 'ila' - without, 'mani' - gem]. It is believed that Shiva also promised to support him in destroying the Kurumbars by sending his holy steed, the Nandi bull. On his orders, the Nandi also gets ready to go and fight for the King. This is why the Nandi in this temple faces outwards, ready to leave for the battle on the orders of Shiva, whereas in all other Shiva temples, it faces inwards facing the sanctum.

== History ==
The temple has inscriptions from the period of Chola and Pandya, as per which, it was located on the banks of a tributary of river Palar. The temple has inscriptions from the period of Medieval Cholas and has received various architectural additions during their regime. An inscription from the period of Uttama Chola (970-85 CE) recorded as AR 669 of 1904 indicates that Sembiyan Mahadevi, the mother of Uttama bought 9,300 kulis of land for 80 kalanju of gold from the Mahasabha of Ambattur and made a gift to the temple. This is the northernmost of temples where Sembiyan Mahadevi donated for the temple construction. There are also inscriptions from the regime of Parthivendravarman, a feudatory of Uttama Chola, which mentions the reconquest of the regions lost to Rashtrakutas during the Battle of Takkolam fought during 949 CE. Another inscription recorded as 677 and 678 of 1904 from the period of Rajendra I (1012–1044 CE) records gifts to the temple. There are other inscriptions from subsequent Chola kings like Kulothunga III (1178–1218 CE) and Rajaraja III (1216–1256 CE). There are inscriptions from Pandya king Jatavarman Sundara Pandyan I and from kings of Vijayanagara Empire like Harihara Raya II (1377–1404 CE), Harihara Raya II (1377–1404 CE) and Mallikarjuna Raya (1446–1465 CE). The large Nandi Bull statue is believed to have been built to commemorate the victory of king Thondaiman over two demon brothers.

== Architecture ==
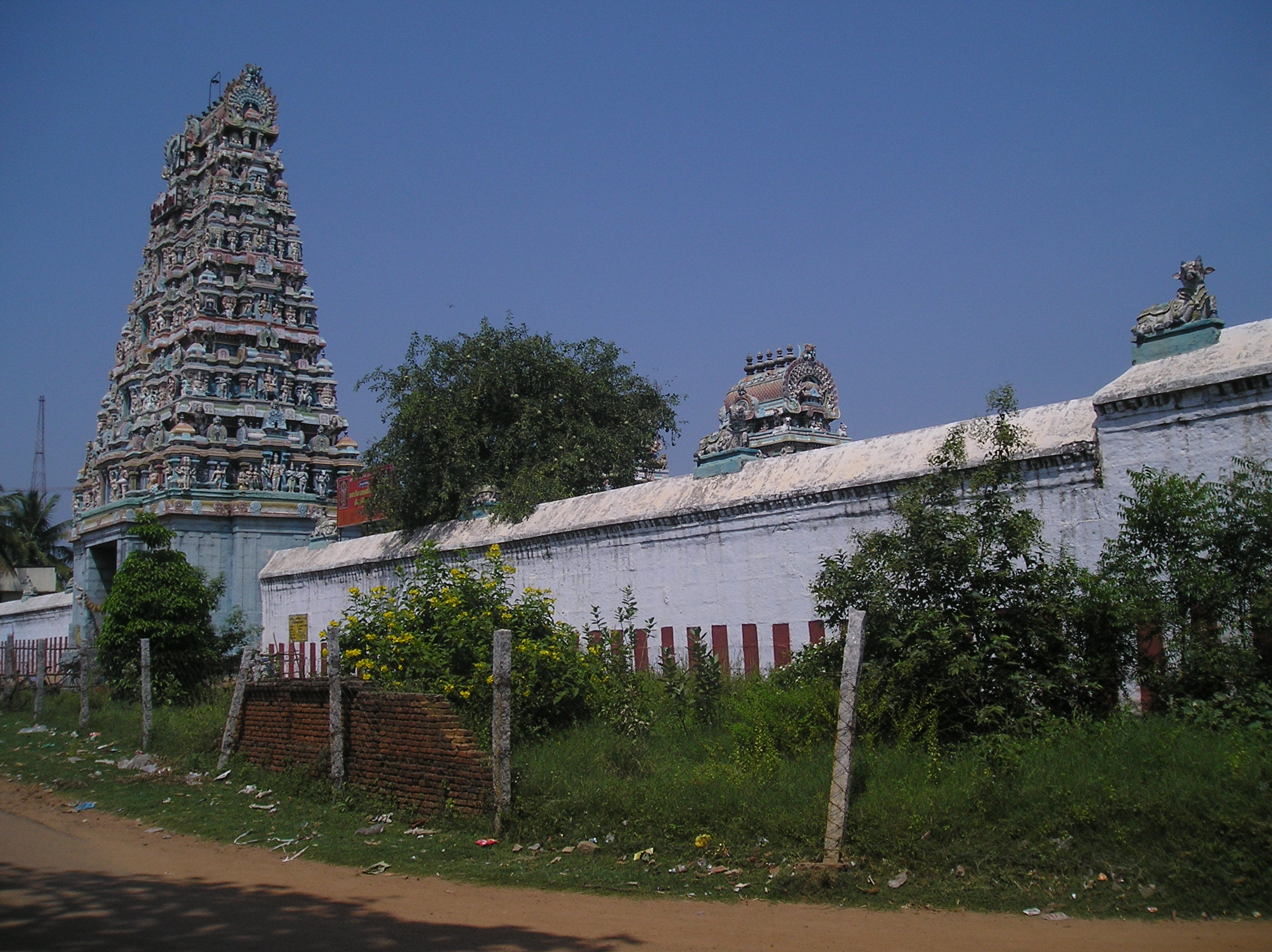
Outer view of the temple

The vimana (roof) of the sanctum sanctorum is designed in a special way that is exclusive to Pallava architecture - the Gaja Prishtam, that looks like the rear of an elephant (Gaja - elephant, prishtam - rear). It is built on a circular base and is known as Thoonganai Maadam in Tamil (thoong(um) - sleeping, aanai - elephant, maadam - top of a building (or temple)) or simply, 'a building that looks like the rear of a sleeping elephant'. The Goddess is called Kodiyidai Nayagi - She who has a waist as slender as the Jasmine climber. She is considered to be a very powerful deity and is known to bestow Her gracious blessings for newly weds, unwed girls for speedy marriage and for a happy married life. There is a scar on the lingam, which is covered with sandalwood paste. There is a smaller linga made of mercury on which ablution is performed. The Vinayaka in this temple is called Valampuri Vinayaka. The temple tank is located outside the temple premises. Unlike other temples, the image of Nandi Bull faces a direction opposite to the sanctum. There are smaller shrines in the temple for Cholapureeswar and Kuchalapureeswarar who are believed to have been worshipped by Lava and Kusha, the sons of Rama. The positions of the deities - Shiva and Parvati (Kodiyidai Amman) is also found to be interchanged as against what is usually found in Shiva temples. It is believed to be so because Shiva and his Consort were in a hurry to give 'Darśana' (holy appearance) to the King. With Shiva's blessings and Nandi's support, the King did win over the battle and proceeded to his capital. As a memoir of the victory, he seized a very prized possession of the Kurumbars—two pillars made of the tree trunk of 'Vellerukku' (white Crown flower - Calotropis gigantea). These pillars can be seen even today placed on both sides, decorating the sanctum sanctorum of the presiding deity.

== Religious importance ==
Thirumullaivoyal is one of the many temple towns in the state which is named after the grooves, clusters or forests dominated by a particular variety of a tree or shrub and the same variety of tree or shrub sheltering the presiding deity. The region is believed to have been covered with Chamapaka forest and hence called Chamapakavanam. She and Her counterparts, Tiruvudai Amman Thirumanangeeswarar Temple- She who symbolises Lakshmi and Vadivudai Amman Thyagaraja Temple, Tiruvottiyur- She who is resplendent with her gracious beauty, are believed to be three Goddesses who shower all auspicious things in life if visited and worshipped on the same day of Chitra Pournami - the full moon day in the Tamil month of Chithirai.

Sundarar, an 8th-century Tamil Shaiva poet, venerated Masilamaniswarar in ten verses in Tevaram, compiled as the Seventh Tirumurai. As the temple is revered in Tevaram, it is classified as Paadal Petra Sthalam, one of the 275 temples that find mention in the Shaiva canon. The temple is counted as the 52nd in the list of temples in the northern banks of Cauvery.

The temple with Kodiyidai Amman as its chief goddess is the third of the Sakthi temple triad in the region of the Tondaimandalam, namely, Thiruvudai Amman (also known as Ichchaa Sakthi, the goddess who fulfills devotees' wishes), Vadivudai Amman (also known as Gnaana Shakti, the goddess who blesses with gnana or knowledge), and Kodiyidai Ammam (also known as Kriya Shakti, the goddess who assists in all actions). The Vadivudai Amman shrine or Thyagaraja Temple is at Tiruvottiyur while the Thiruvudai Amman shrine or Thirumanangeeswarar Temple is at Minjur.

== See also ==
- Heritage structures in Chennai
- Religion in Chennai
