= Kattoor, Pathanamthitta =

Kattoor
- town
- Location in Kerala, India Kattoor (India)
- Coordinates: 9°20′0″N 76°44′0″E
- Country: India
- State: Kerala
- District: Pathanamthitta

Languages
  - Official: Malayalam, English
- Time zone: UTC+5:30 (IST)
- Vehicle registration: KL-

Kattoor is a village near Kozhencherry on the southern side of Pamba river on the way from Kozhencherry to Ranni in Cherukole Panchayath in Pathanamthitta District which is part of the state of Kerala, India. Kattoor is situated 5 km east of Kozhencherry town and 9 km west of Ranni town.

== Geography ==
It is located at 9°20′0″N 76°44′0″E.

== Educational Institutions in Kattoor ==
- N.S.S High School Kattoor
- N.S.S T.T.I Cherukole

== Neighbouring places ==
- Vazhakunnam
- Kacherypadi
- Kalapamon
- Chanamankal
- Kilianikkal
- Puthamon
- Plamthottam Perumethupadi
- Vayalathala
- Keekozhoor
- Ayroor
- Melukara

== Nearest Towns ==
- Kozhencherry
- Ranni
- Pathanamthitta
