= Thirumanangeeswarar Temple =

Hindu temple in Tamil Nadu, India

Thirumanangeeswarar - Thiruvudai Amman Kovil
- Location in Tamil Nadu

Religion
- Affiliation: Hinduism
- District: Tiruvallur
- Deity: Thirumanangeeswarar (Shiva), Thiruvudai Amman (Parvathi)

Location
- Location: Melur, Near Minjur, Chennai, Tiruvallur
- State: Tamil Nadu
- Country: India
- Coordinates: 13°15′37″N 80°16′12″E

Thirumanangeeswarar Temple is a Hindu temple located in Melur, south of Minjur, Chennai, Tamil Nadu.

The temple is dedicated to Thiruvudai Amman as its chief goddess (Ichchaa Sakthi). The temple is one of the Sakthi triad in the Tondaimandalam region, the other two being the Kodiyidai Amman Temple or Masilamaniswara Temple at Thirumullaivoyal and the Vadivudai Amman Temple or Thyagaraja Temple at Tiruvottiyur.

== See also ==
- Heritage structures in Chennai
- Religion in Chennai
