= Kaliya Nayanar =

Kaliya Nayanar, also known as Kalia Nayanar, Kalia, Kaliya, Kaliyanar and Kaliyar, is a Nayanar saint, venerated in the Hindu sect of Shaivism. He is generally counted as the forty-fourth in the list of 63 Nayanars. The Nayanar saint is described to serve the god Shiva by lighting lamps in his Thyagaraja Temple. He is said to have been willing to cut his throat to fill the lamps with his blood, when he ran out of oil.

== Life ==
The life of Kaliya Nayanar is described in the Periya Puranam by Sekkizhar (12th century), which is a hagiography of the 63 Nayanars. Kaliya Nayanar was a Vaishya, the merchant caste. He was an oil-monger from Thiruvottriyur, presently in the city premises of Chennai, India. It is famous for its Thyagaraja Temple, dedicated to the god Shiva, the patron god of Shaivism. Kaliya is said to have lived on the Chakrapadi Street in Thiruvottriyur.

Kaliya was very wealthy, yet out of love he served Shiva by keeping the lamps in the temple lit day and night. To test Kaliya's devotion and reveal his absolute love for Shiva to the world, Shiva made his wealth diminish over time. However, Kaliya continued his service by supplying oil for lighting the lamps at the temple. His family refused to help him with the service. He also worked as a daily wage labourer to pay for the oil, unmindful of his status. He worked in an oil churning wheel and borrowed oil from work to light the lamps of the temple. As the people working in the oil business grew, he lost his source of income as a labourer. He even sold his properties. When all his oil was over, he decided to kill himself to fulfil his commitment to Shiva. He arranged the wicks in the lamps and took a knife to slit his throat; his blood could be used to substitute the oil in the lamps. However, Shiva caught hold of his hand as he started cutting his throat. Shiva appeared with his consort Parvati and blessed Kaliya, whose wound magically healed. Kaliya was granted moksha (salvation) and a place in Shiva's abode Kailash.

== Remembrance ==
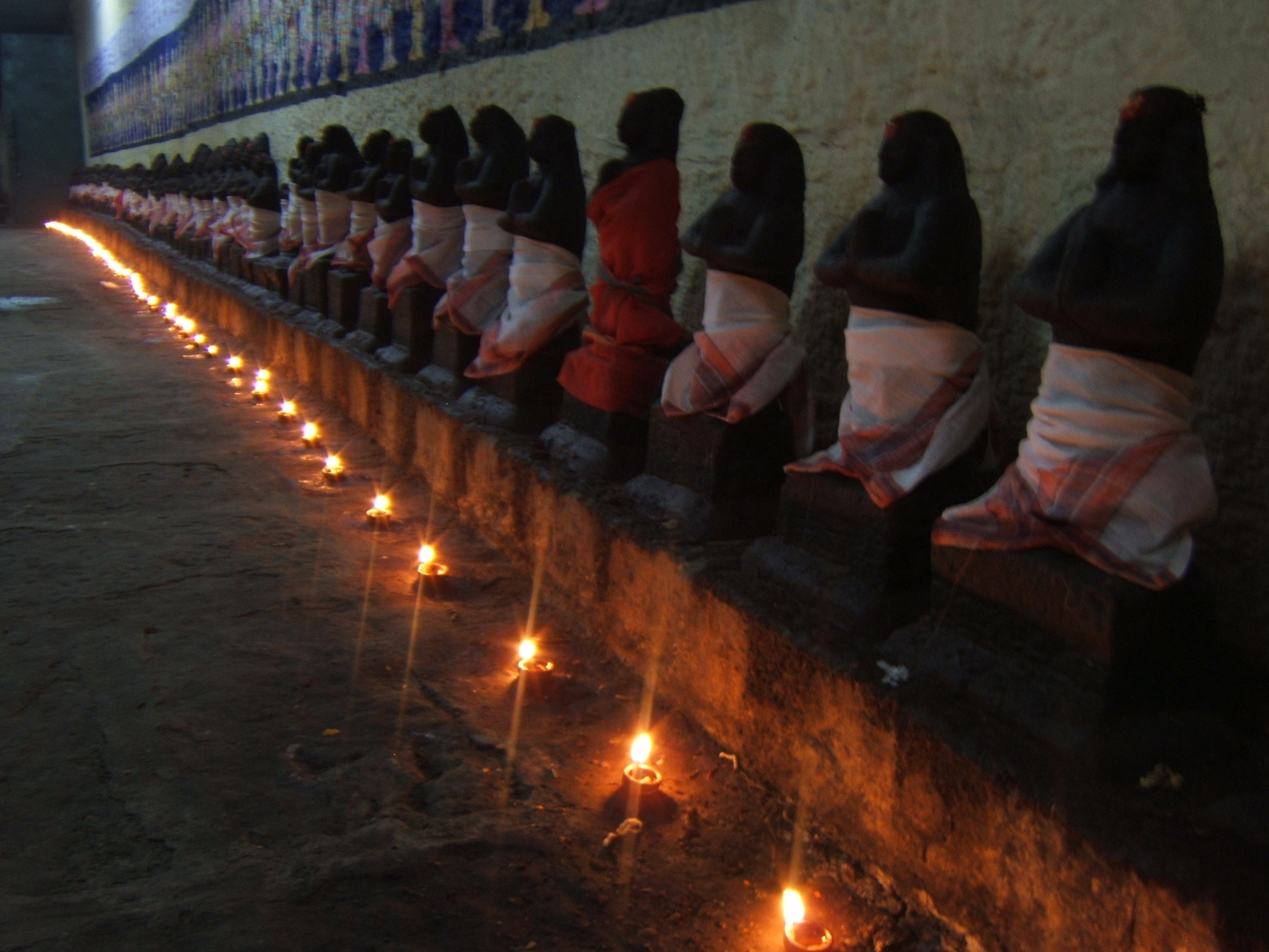
The idols of the Nayanars are found in many Shiva temples in Tamil Nadu.

A holy day in the Tamil month of Adi, when the moon enters the Jyeshtha nakshatra (lunar mansion) is assigned for worship of Kaliya Nayanar. Kaliya Nayanar receives collective worship as part of the 63 Nayanars. Their icons and brief accounts of his deeds are found in many Shiva temples in Tamil Nadu. Their images are taken out in procession in festivals.
