= Kattupalli =

Kattupalli காட்டுபள்ளி
- Suburb
- Location within Tamil Nadu Location within India
- Coordinates: 13.30666°N 80.33300°E
- Country: India
- State: Tamil Nadu
- District: Tiruvallur
- Taluk: Ponneri
- Metro: Chennai
- Elevation: 4 m (13 ft)

Population (2011)
  - Total: 1,911

Languages
  - Official: Tamil
- Time zone: UTC+5:30 (IST)
- PIN: 600120
- Telephone code: 044-xxxx
- Vehicle registration: TN-18-xxxx & TN-20-xxxx(old)
- Planning agency: DTCP
- City: Chennai
- Lok Sabha constituency: Thiruvallur
- Vidhan Sabha constituency: Ponneri

Kattupalli (Tamil: காட்டுபள்ளி), is a suburb located North of Chennai, a metropolitan city in Tamil Nadu, India.

== Location ==
Kattupalli is located in between Ennore, Pazhaverkadu and Minjur in North of Chennai. The arterial road in Kattupalli is Port access road (Ennore - Pazhaverkadu road).

== Seawater Desalination Plant ==
The Minjur seawater desalination plant in Kattupalli plays a major role of water supply in North Chennai.

== Kattupalli Port ==
The Kattupalli Port cum Shipyard is a private complex which has a port and a ship building unit. It is third largest port in Chennai after Chennai Port and Ennore Port. There were strong opposition from people for proposal of expanding the port.
