= Marundeeswarar Temple =

Hindu temple in Chennai, Tamil Nadu, India

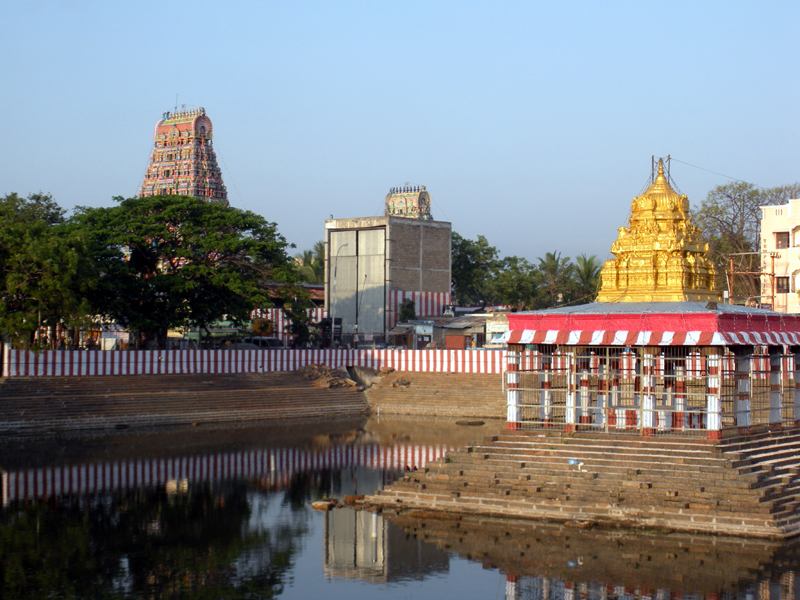
- Marundeeswarar Temple and Tank in the morning sunlight

- Location in Tamil Nadu

Religion
- Affiliation: Hinduism
- Deity: Marundeeswarar (Shiva)
- Festivals: Panguni Brahmmotsavam in March- April, Shivrathri in February–March

Location
- Location: Tiruvanmiyur, Chennai
- State: Tamil Nadu
- Country: India
- Coordinates: 12°59′08″N 80°15′41″E

Architecture
- Type: Tamil architecture
- Creator: Cholas

Marundeeswarar Temple is a temple of the Hindu deity Shiva, located in Thiruvanmiyur, Chennai. It is one of the 275 Paadal Petra Sthalams where two of the most revered Nayanars (Saivite Saints), Appar and Tirugnana Sambandar, mentioned the temple in their verses during the 7th century CE. The temple has been widely expanded by Chola kings during the 11th century CE. The temple has two seven-tiered gateway towers, a huge tank, with the overall temple area covering 1 acre.

The masonry structure was built during the Chola dynasty in the 9th century, while later expansions are attributed to Vijayanagar rulers. The temple is maintained and administered by the Hindu Religious and Charitable Endowments Department of the Government of Tamil Nadu. A consecration of the temple after renovation was performed in February 2020. The previous one was in May 2008.

== Legend ==
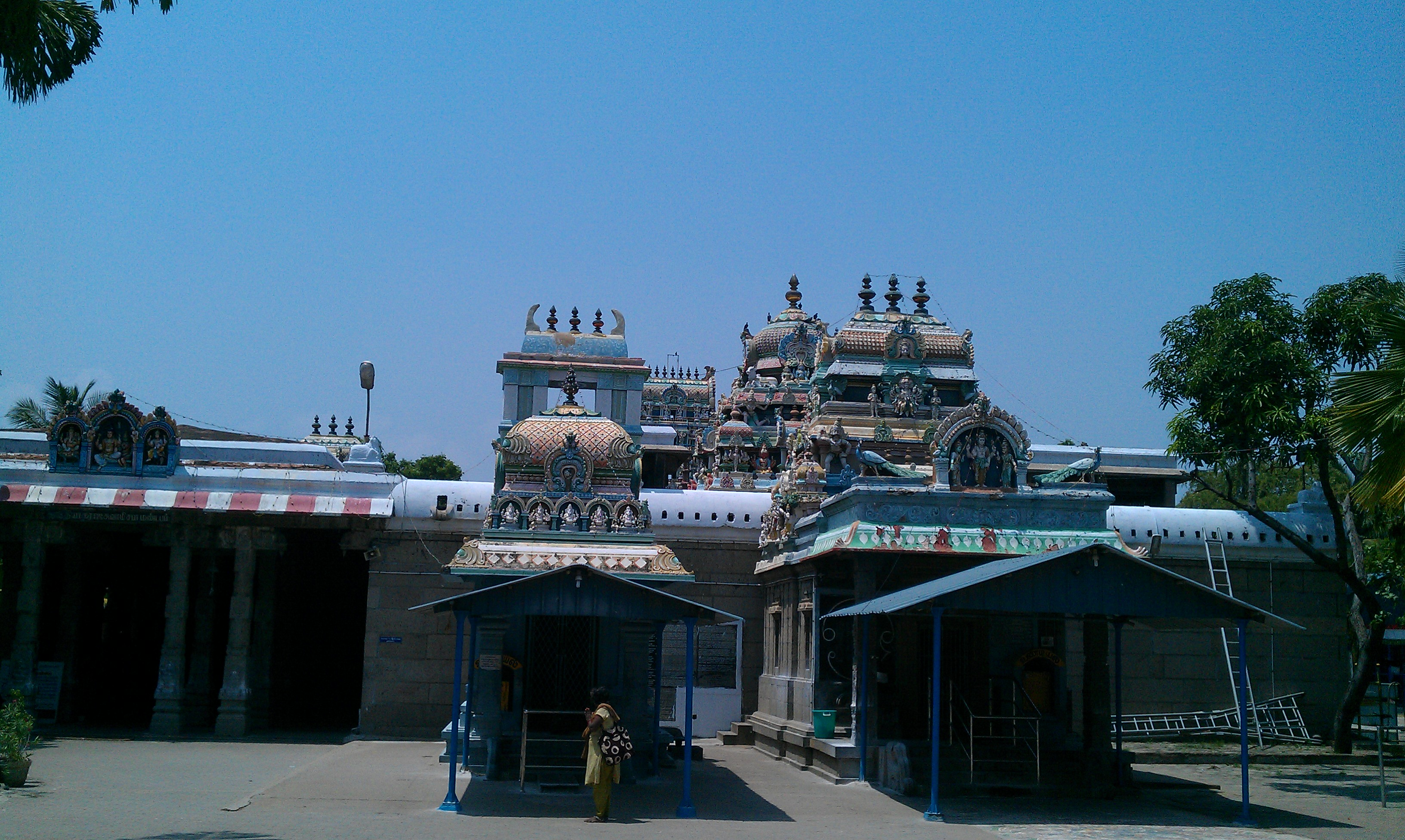
Marundeeswarar shrine

Marundeeswarar is known so because he imparted sage Agastya on curative properties of various herbs and plants. Since then the Marundeeswarar temple has been a place of worship for people with diseases and various problems with their health. It is said that sage Valmiki, who wrote Ramayana, worshiped Shiva in the temple. Since Valmiki was blessed here, the place was to be known as Thiruvalmikiyur, which is pronounced as 'Thiruvanmikiyur' in Tamil, the name gradually changed to Thiruvanmiyur. There is a place present in Thiruvanmiyur called Valmiki Nagar in his honour. There is also a shrine for the sage on the Western side of the temple on what is presently called the East Coast Road (ECR). The lingam for which Hanuman performed pooja, the lingam (Meenakshi Sundareswarar) that cured the curse of Indra, the Lingam for which Saint Bharadwaja performed pooja are present here. Markandeyar performed a penance and prayed to Shiva here, Brahma conducted a festival here for Shiva. The presiding deity is also called Palvannanathar as Kamadhenu, the sacred cow, is said to have performed oblation on the Sivalingam with her milk. As per another legend, Sun and Moon perform their worship practices daily during sunset on account of which the main shrine is believed to be facing west.

== History ==
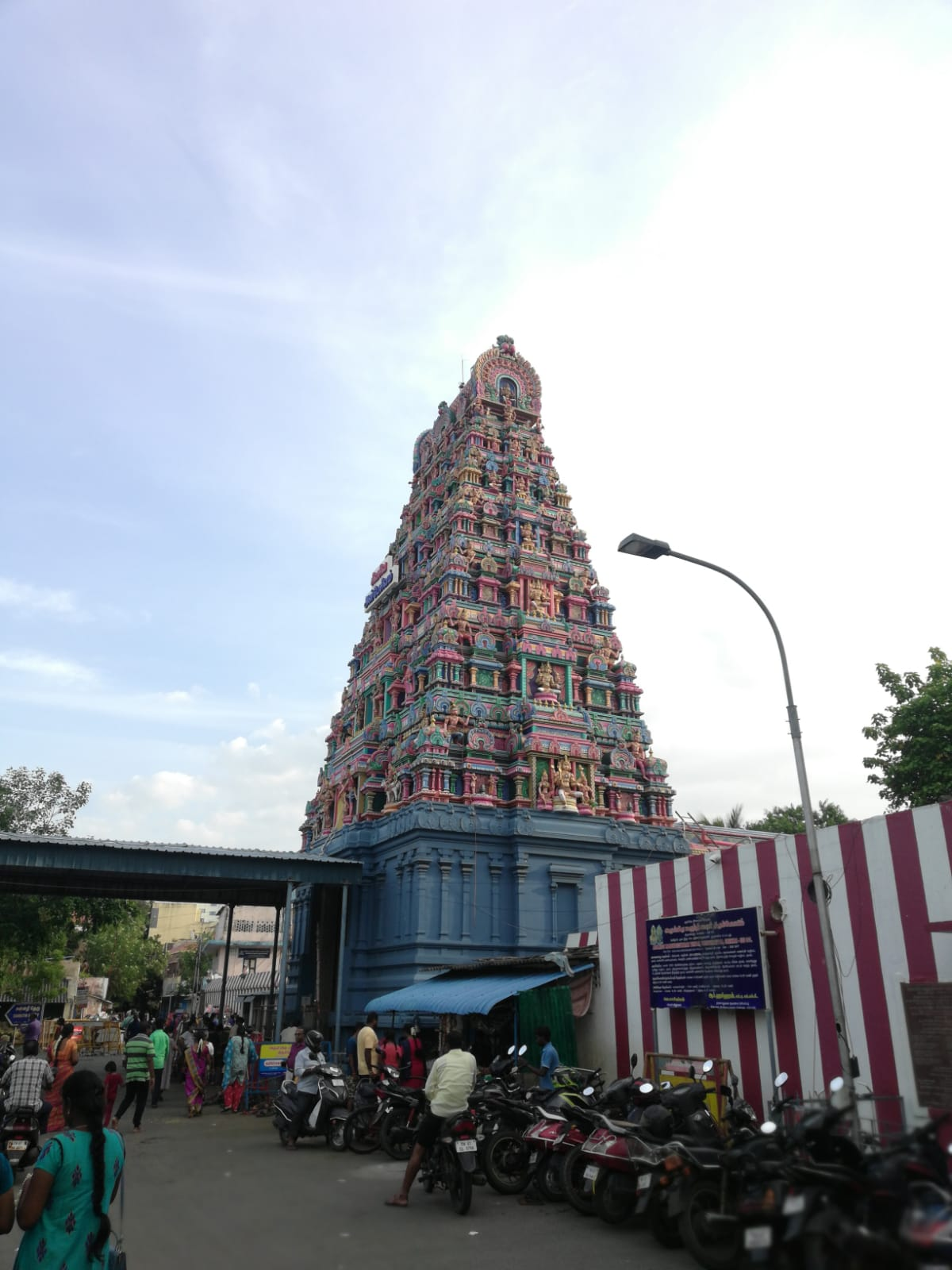
The temple's rajagopuram (main tower)

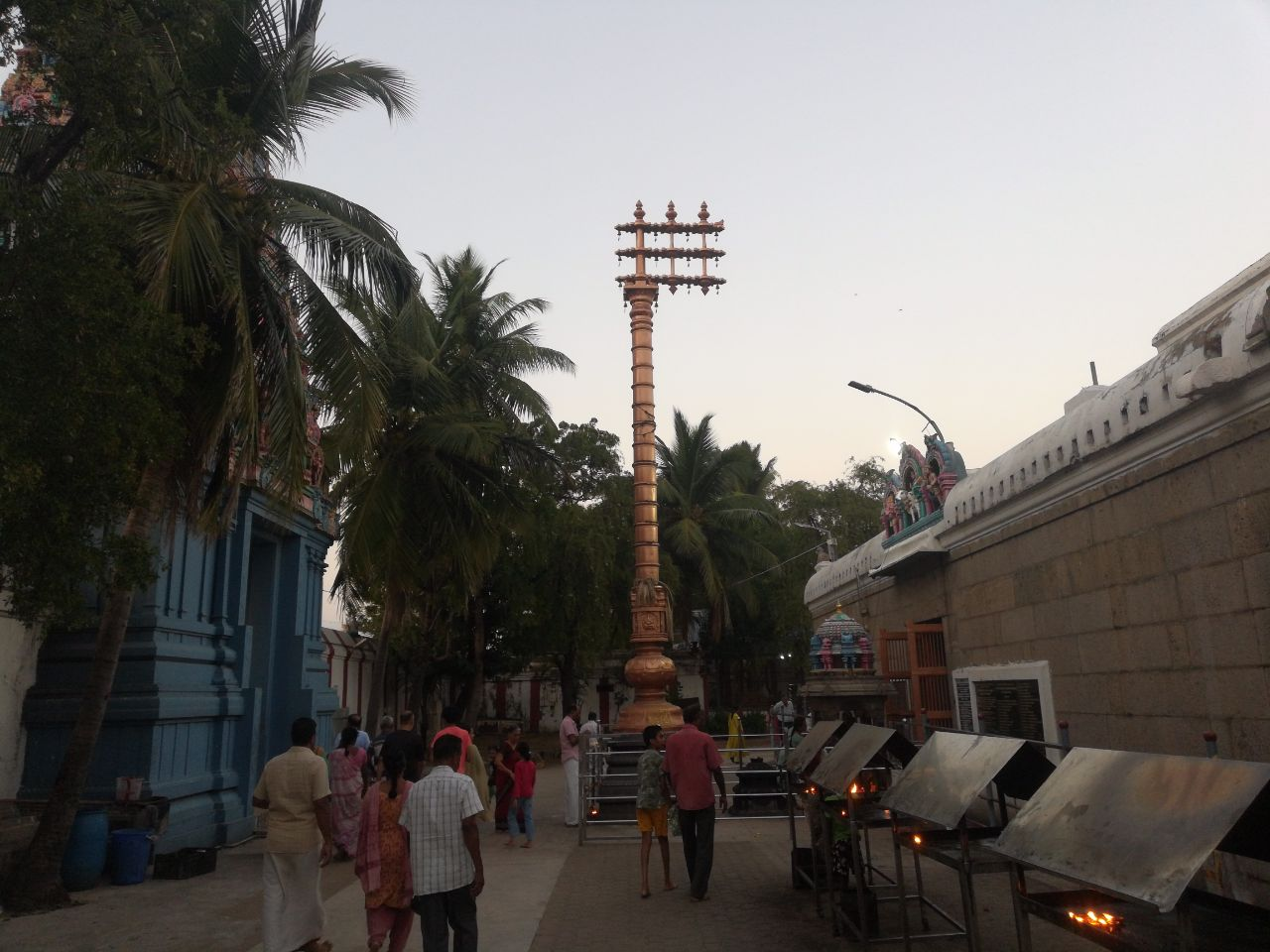
Dwajasthambham (sacred mast) near the western entrance of the temple

The road starting from Marundeeswarar temple, now called ECR was an important route during the Chola period and was known as Vadagaperuvazhi, connecting the kingdom to places in Thanjavur and Andhra Pradesh. Inscriptions can be found in the shrine of Tripurasundari Amman dating back to the 11th century during the period of Rajendra Chola. The origins and antiquity of this temple is corroborated by the inscriptions found in other temples in the city namely Kapaleeswarar Temple, Virupaksheeswarar Temple and Thiruvidandai which bear testimony to Tiruvanmiyur's existence. A new life has been put into this ancient worshipping place, first in the year 1903 and then in the 1970s. This temple along with the Kapaleeswarar Temple and the Thiruvottiyur Thyagarajaswamy Temple form the famous Trinity Sea Shore temples of Thondai Mandalam.

== Architecture ==
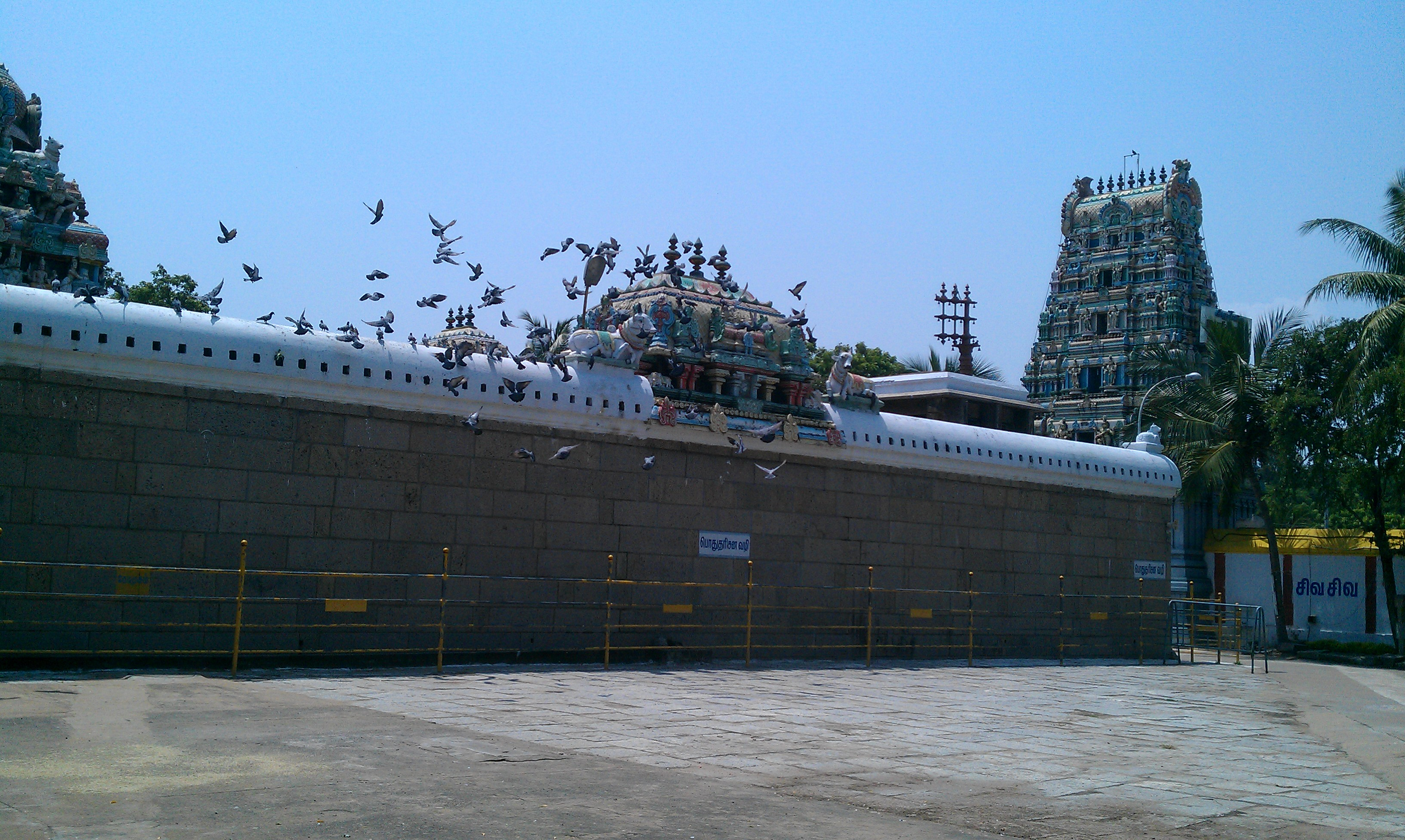
Temple tower

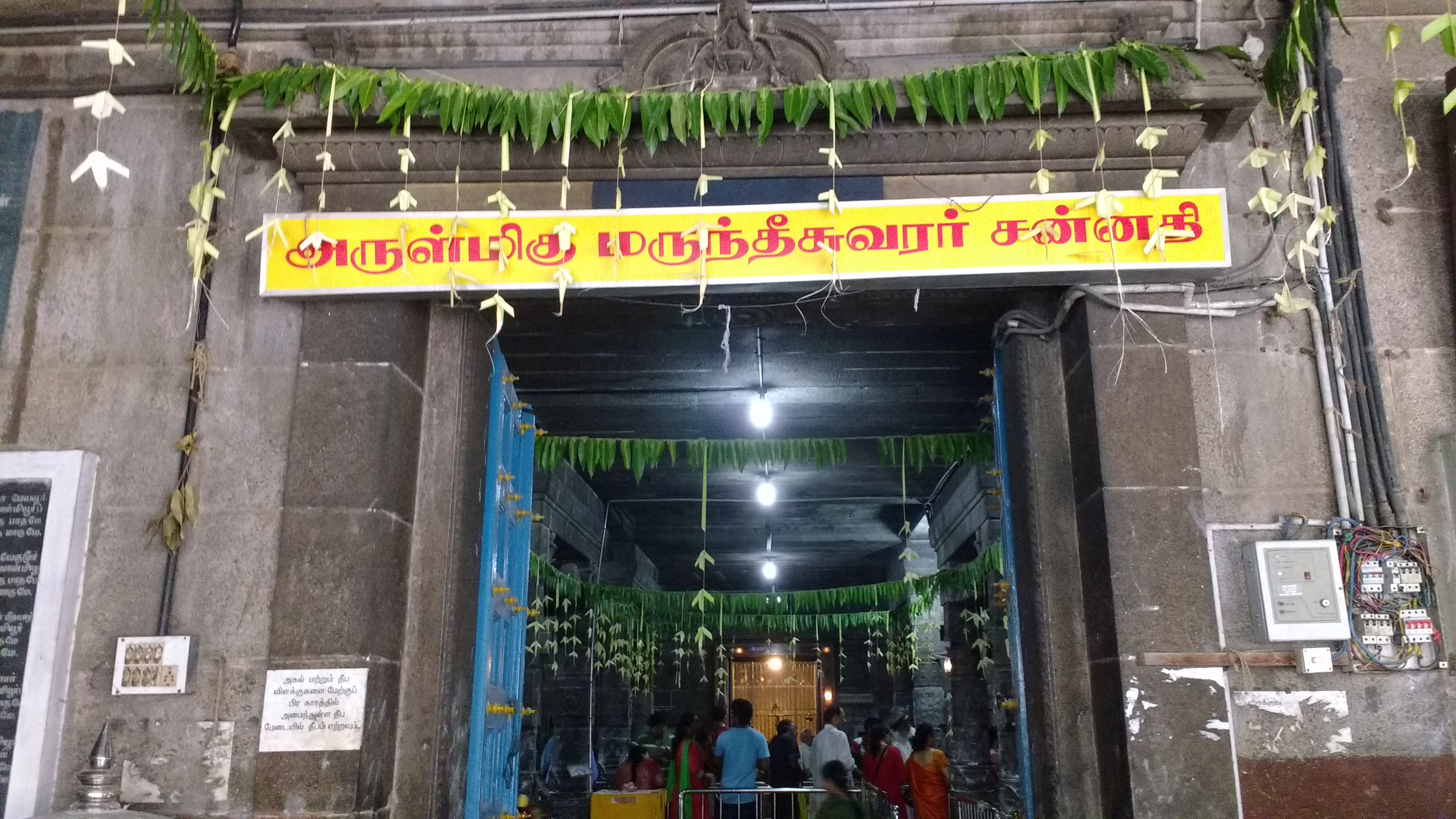
Shrine of presiding deity

The temple is believed to have partial feature of Pallava dynasty and partially with Chola art. The temple has two entrances, one from East Coast Road and the other from West Tank Street both adorned by 5-tiered gopuram (gateway tower). The Entrance from the West Tank Street has three gates whereas the entrance from the East Coast Road has only one gate. The temple occupies an area of about 1 acre – numerous images adorn the pillars of the temple, while stucco figures adorn the gopurams. The mandapam (hall) housing the Somaskanda form of Shiva has 36 massive pillars adorned with carvings.

The temple has smaller shrines for Ganesha, Murugan, there is a shine for 3 Ganeshas who control all three time periods, adjacent to this a vedagama padasalai is situated. The shiva linga is a swayambu (or a natural formation and not built like Kapaleeshwara temple at Mylapore). Hence pure cows milk alone is used for abhishekam. The shrine of Shiva, which has the idols of Shiva in his three forms, Tyagaraja, Marundeeswarar, and Nataraja. The last shrine is for Marundeeswarar's consort, Tripura Sundari, who is considered to be Parvati. The samadhi of Pamban Swamigal is also found near the shrine.

== Literary mention ==
The temple is mentioned in the verses of Tevaram, the 7th century saivite canonical work by the two saint poets namely, Appar and Sambandar.

கரையு லாங்கட லிற்பொலி சங்கம்வெள் ளிப்பிவன்
றிரையு லாங்கழி மீனுக ளுந்திரு வான்மியூர்
உரையு லாம்பொரு ளாயுல காளுடை யீர்சொலீர்
வரையு லாமட மாதுட னாகிய மாண்பதே."

Translation:

Tiruvāṉmiyūr where the fish leap in the back water where the strong waves move about, taking from the sea which moves towards the shore the shining conches, and white oysters. Lord who rules over the world, being the meaning of the words please tell me about the dignity of having a beautiful lady who wanders in the mountain.

Another verse addressed the goddess of the temple as

விரையார் கொன்றையினாய் விடமுண்ட மிடற்றினனே
உரையார் பல்புகழா யுமைநங்கையொர் பங்குடையாய்
திரையார் தெண்கடல்சூழ் திருவான்மி யூருறையும்
அரையா வுன்னையல்லா லடையாதென தாதரவே.

Translation:

Sivaṉ who wears koṉṟai flowers abundant in fragrance!
who has neck which consumed the poison!
who has many forms of fame which are spoken by devotees!
who has Umai;
a lady of distinction, as a half!
the King who dwells in tiruvāṉmiyūr, surrounded by the clear sea full of waves.
my love will not reach other gods except you.

Arunagirinathar has visited this temple and has sung praises of Subramanya here.

== Reconstruction ==
The Kumbhabhishekham (coronation after renovation) of the temple was performed on 23 May 2008. The construction of the Rajagopuram on the eastern side of temple started 45 years ago, but was completed only before the function following the Government issued orders for completing it at a cost of Rs 45 lakh. Rs 1 crore was spent for improving infrastructure at the temple, which included construction of additional compound wall, Annadanakudam, office complex and amenities for devotees.

== See also ==
- Heritage structures in Chennai

== Gallery ==
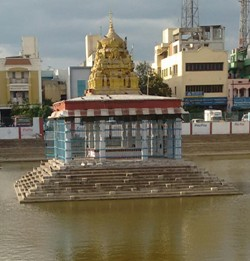
Temple tank near East gopura

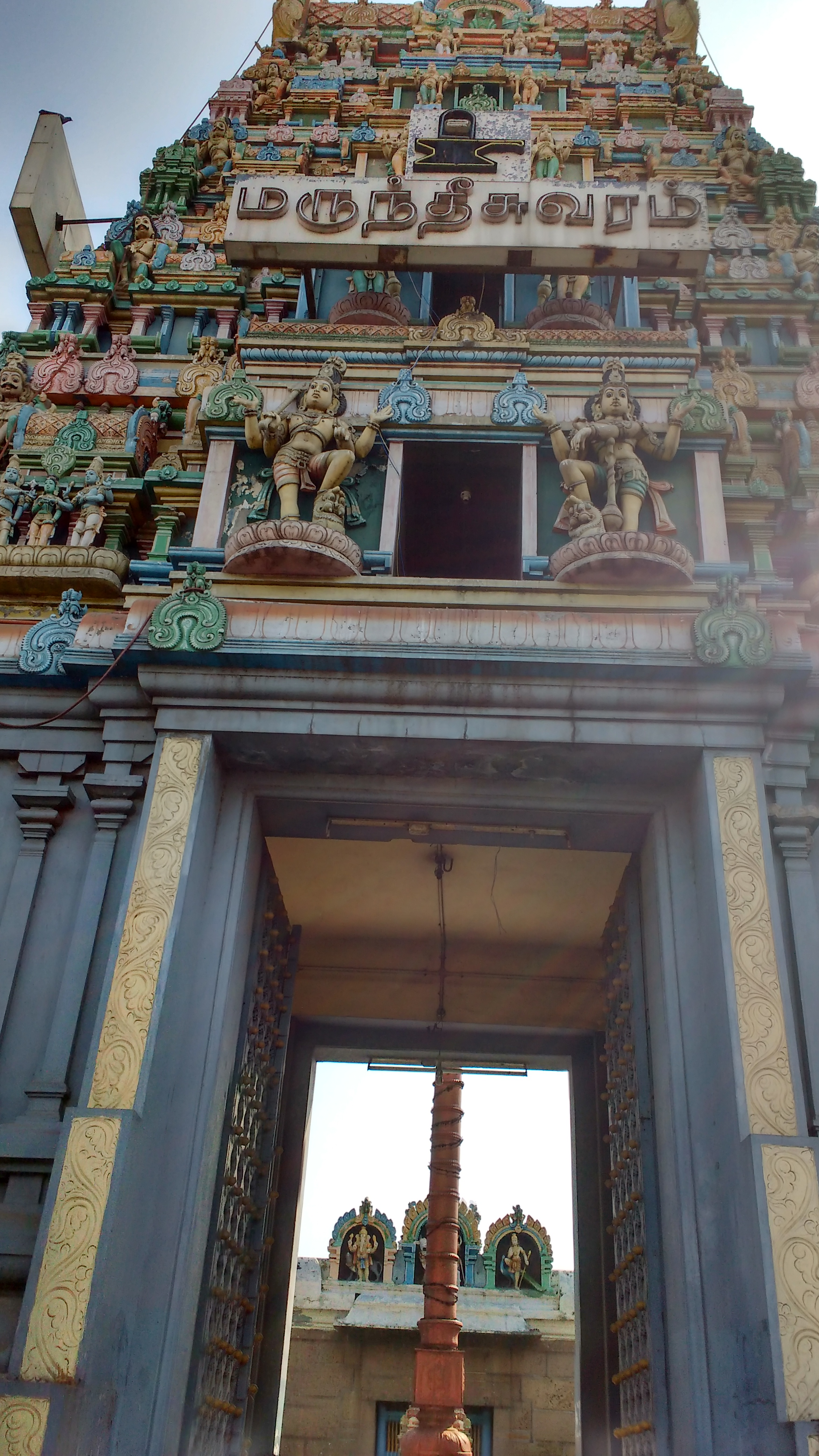
West gopura

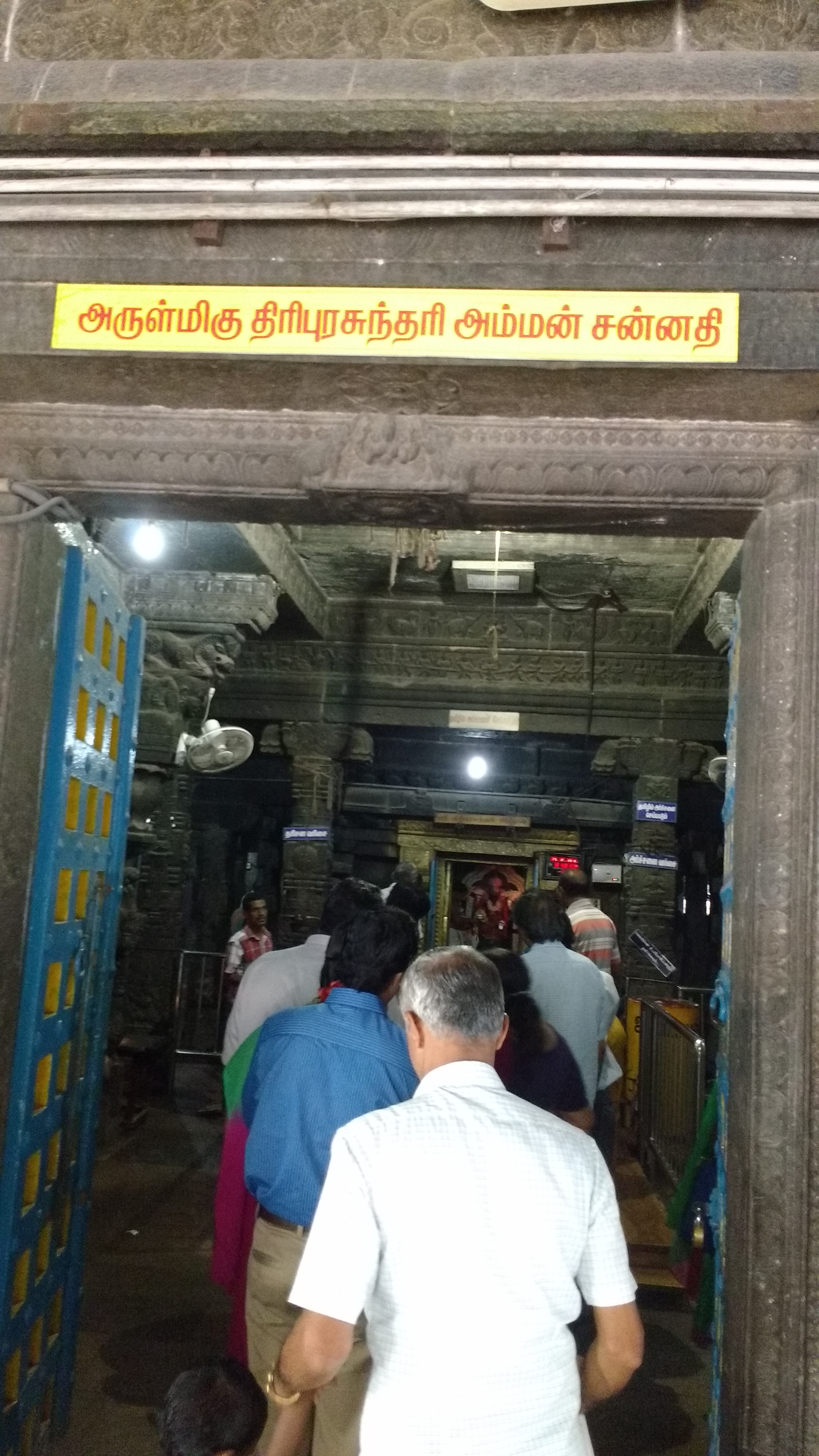
Shrine of Tripura Sundari

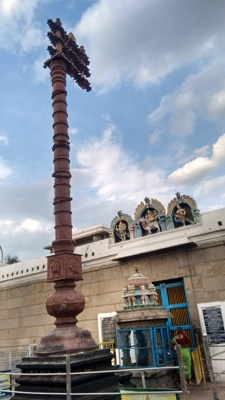
Flagpost near West entrance

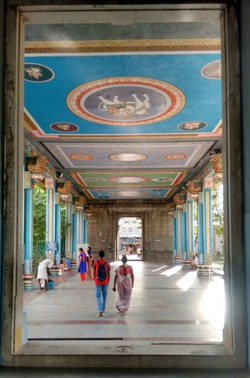
Front mandapa

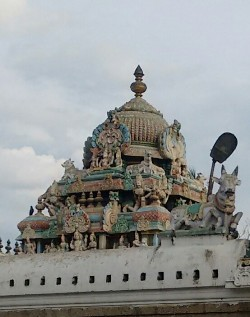
Vimana of presiding deity
