= Ennore railway station =

Railway station in Ennore, India

Ennore
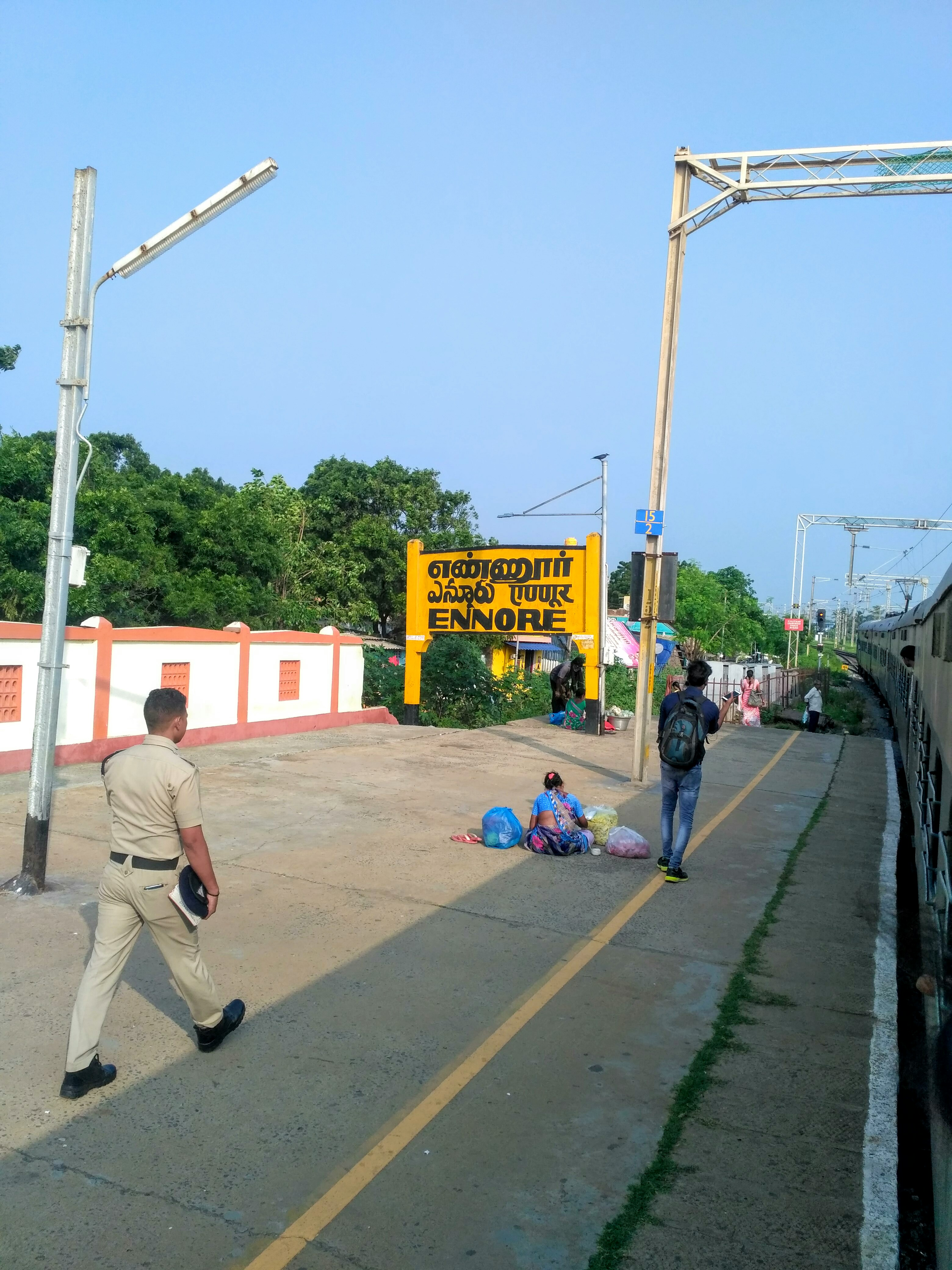
- The name board at Ennore Railway Station

General information
- Location: Ennore, Chennai, Tamil Nadu, India
- Coordinates: 13°13′4″N 80°19′17″E
- System: Indian Railways and Chennai Suburban Railway station
- Owner: Ministry of Railways, Indian Railways
- Line: North line of Chennai Suburban Railway

Construction
- Structure type: Standard on-ground station
- Parking: Available

Other information
- Station code: ENR
- Fare zone: Southern Railways

History
- Electrified: 13 April 1979
- Former names: South Indian Railway

Passengers
- 2013: 15,000
Location
- Location within India Location within Tamil Nadu

Ennore railway station is one of the railway stations of the Chennai Central–Gummidipoondi section of the Chennai Suburban Railway Network. It serves the neighbourhood of Ennore, a suburb of Chennai, and is located 16 kilometres north of Chennai Central railway station. It has an elevation of 7 metres above sea level.

== History ==
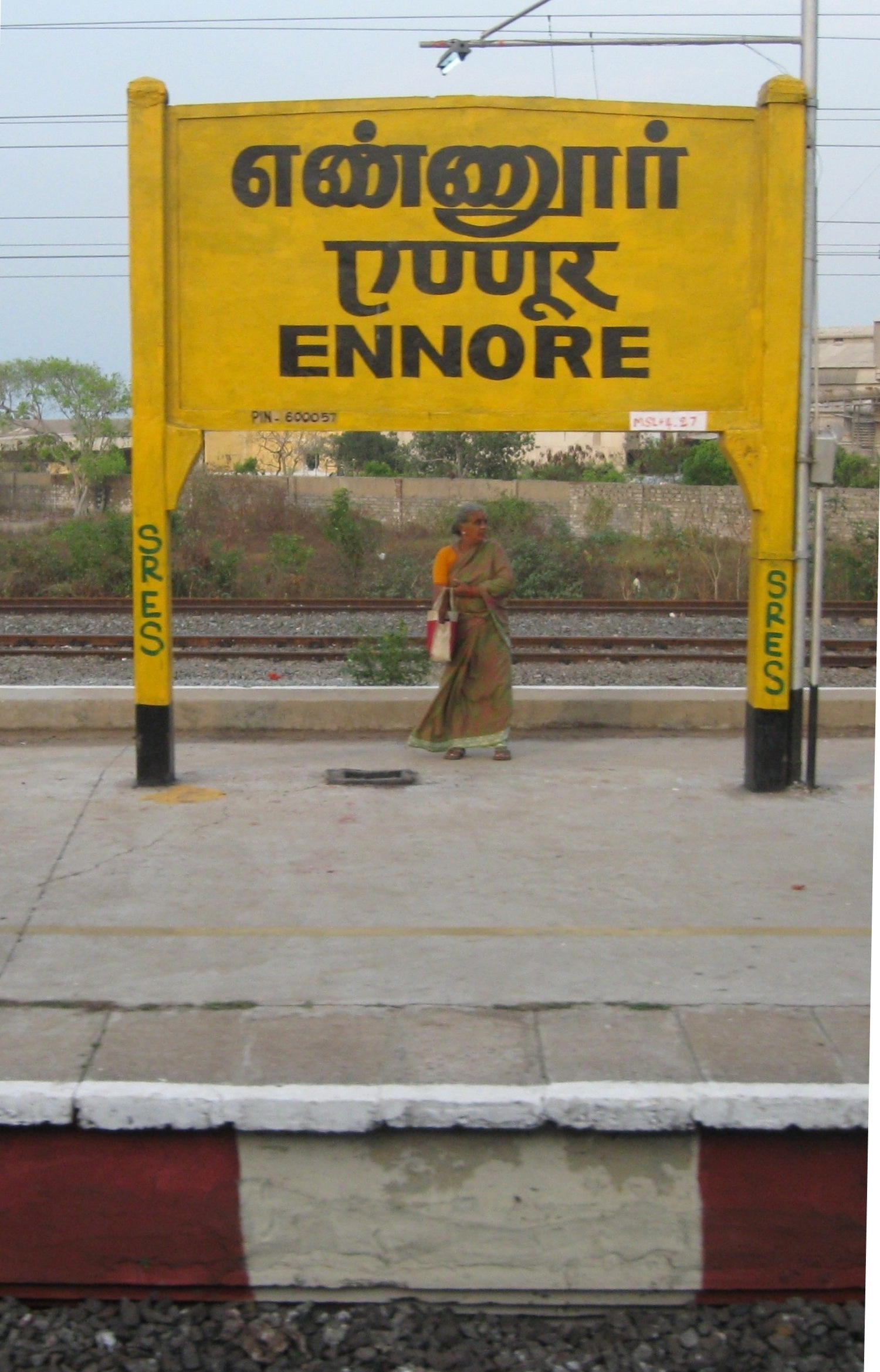
Name board at the station

The lines at the station were electrified on 13 April 1979, with the electrification of the Chennai Central–Gummidipoondi section.

== Traffic ==
About 15,000 people uses the station every day.

== See also ==
- Chennai Suburban Railway
- Railway stations in Chennai
