= Kattoor, Alappuzha =

Kattoor
- Village
- Location in Kerala, India Kattoor (India)
- Coordinates: 9°34′0″N 76°18′0″E
- Country: India
- State: Kerala
- District: Alappuzha

Languages
  - Official: Malayalam, English
- Time zone: UTC+5:30 (IST)
- PIN: 688546
- Telephone code: 0477
- Vehicle registration: KL-04
- Nearest city: Alappuzha
- Lok Sabha constituency: Alappuzha
- Vidhan Sabha constituency: Alappuzha

Kattoor is a coastal village in Aryad Block Alappuzha district, Kerala, India. It is under Mararikulam south panchayath. Located 8 km towards North from Alappuzha and 3 km from Aryad. Kattoor is surrounded by Alappuzha Block at South, Kanjikkuzhy Block at North, Cherthala Block at North, Champakulam Block at South.

== Schools ==
The Holy Family Higher Secondary School is basically a government aided school is run by Holy Family Visitation Congregation Convent, Kattoor under the guide ship of Alleppey Diocese Corporate Management for Schools. It is one of the 3 Higher Secondary Schools run by the Corporate Management. The school has a history of more than 90 years of service to bring up education, culture and economy of this coastal village. Basically, the medium of instruction in this school is Malayalam. Because of intense desire of parents to improve their children's English Language ability and to compete in a global education and employment market, the management of school began medium of instruction and learning as English in a few divisions in each standards. As well as, a new School accredited to Central Board of Secondary Education is started along with the school.

Many politicians, professionals such as doctors, engineers, technologists, business men, business administrators, medical professionals etc., who are products of this school are working different parts of globe.

The importance given to the co-curricular and extra- curricular activities is being appreciated by the public.

== Hospitals ==
- Holy Family Hospital
- Government Homoeo Dispensary
- Government Veterinary Hospital

== Temple ==
- Panackal Sree Mahadevi Temple
- Kurikkassery Ambalam (Temple)
- Karakkal Ambalam (Temple)
- Hanumanswami temple

== Church ==
- St. Michael's Forane Church -
- St. Vicent Pallotti Church
- Kristhuraja Church, Cheriyapozhi

== Convent ==
- Holy Family Convent, Kattoor
- St. Vincent Pallotti Convent, Kattoor
