= Kattur, Thanjavur district =

Village in Tamil Nadu, India

Kattur is a small village in Thanjavur district, Tamil Nadu, India. Near to Central university of Thiruvarur. It is situated 12 km west of the Thiruvar city (between the Thiruvarur to Kumbakonam highway).

== Demographics ==
In the 2001 census, Kattur had a total population of 1,773, consisting of 887 males and 886 females. The literacy rate was 71.61 percent.
