= Likud Haredi faction =

Likud Haredi faction (HFL, Hebrew: המטה החרדי בליכוד), founded on 15 March 2011 in Bnei Brak, is a group of Likud party members affiliated with the Haredi sector. The goal of the faction is to influence Israeli Knesset members and ministers of the Likud party to act "to strengthen Jewish identity and tradition in the Likud and Israel".

== History ==
In 2013, internal elections in the Likud elevated most HFL members of the Bnei Brak branch of the Likud. In addition, the HFL operates branches in all concentrations of Haredim in Israel, including Jerusalem, Safed, Immanuel, Modi'in Illit, Betar Illit, Elad, and Netanya.

HFL arranges events and meetings with Knesset members, ministers, and public officials.

HFL also promotes special projects, such as religious dialogue.

In October 2012, HFL introduced Yaakov Vider as a Knesset candidate in the Likud primaries. On 27 November 2012, Vider got the 47th spot on the list, and after the Likud list was unified with Israel Beiteinu, Vider was number 80 on the list.

HFL collaborates with other groups in the Likud party, such as Young Likud and Manhigut Yehudit.

In 2013, Yaakov Vider, HFL chairman, was elected for member of the Likud party presidium.
