= Devadhanam, Thiruvallur district =

Neighbourhood in Tiruvallur district, Tamil Nadu, India

- Neighbourhood
- Devadhanam, Tiruvallur, Tamil Nadu
- Coordinates: 13°18′21″N 80°14′06″E
- Country: India
- State: Tamil Nadu
- District: Tiruvallur

Languages
  - Official: Tamil, English
- Time zone: UTC+5:30 (IST)
- PIN: 601203
- Other Neighborhoods: Ponneri, Minjur
- District Collector: Dr. Alby John Varghese, I. A. S.
- LS: Tiruvallur
- VS: Ponneri
- Website: https://tiruvallur.nic.in

Devadhanam is a village in Thiruvallur District, Tamil Nadu, India. Its postal code is 601203.

== Location ==
Devadhanam is located in Tiruvallur district with the geographic coordinates of 13°18′21.6″N 80°14′05.6″E.

== Religion ==
Venkatesa Perumal Temple situated in Devadhanam is maintained under the control of the Hindu Religious and Charitable Endowments Department, Government of Tamil Nadu.

== Politics ==
Devadhanam comes under Ponneri Assembly constituency and Tiruvallur Lok Sabha constituency.
