= Hinduja Foundries =

Part of Hinduja Group

Hinduja Foundries Ltd
- Company type: Public
- Industry: Foundry
- Founded: 1959
- Headquarters: Chennai, India
- Products: Grey iron, aluminum, SG iron castings
- Net income: Rs. 5 billion
- Number of employees: 2500 (approx)
- Parent: Hinduja Group
- Website: www.hindujafoundries.in

Hinduja Foundries Ltd (HFL) is a part of the $12 billion Hinduja Group. Hinduja Foundries is India’s largest casting maker. Hinduja has three facilities in Chennai and Hyderabad which put together manufacturer's 100,000 MT of castings in the form of cylinder blocks, heads, housings, manifolds, brake drums etc., made of aluminum, cast iron and SG iron.

Hinduja Foundries has two plants. The parent company is in Ennore, Chennai, one in Sriperumbudur.

== History ==
Hinduja Foundries was established in 1959 as Ennore Foundries. It was named so because it was founded in Ennore, a fishermens hamlet situated app.15 km north of Chennai. Initially promoted by British Leyland, Ennore Foundry began commercial production in 1961. Since then the castings manufactured at its plant has been supplied to automobile industries across India.

Hinduja Foundries was established to cater to the needs of Ashok Leyland and became the largest casting maker in India. Ennore foundries acquired Ductron Castings in Hyderabad and set up a green field foundry in Sriperumbudur.

Hinduja is the largest automotive jobbing foundry in India with production capacity of nearly 100,000 MT of grey iron casting and 3000 MT of aluminum gravity die-casting.

In 2016 it was announced that Hinduja Foundries Ltd was to be amalgamated with Ashok Leyland Ltd.

== Products ==
Products from Hinduja Foundries range from 10 kg to 300 kg in grey iron and 0.5 to 16.5 kg in aluminum gravity die castings. Product ranges include cylinder blocks, cylinder heads, flywheels, flywheel housings, transmission casings, clutch plates, brake drums, intake manifolds and clutch housings for HCV, LCV and car segments.

== Holdings ==
LRLIH Limited, UK (earlier a part of a British Leyland Group, UK) was acquired by Hindujas and Iveco Limited in 1987. Iveco a part of FIAT Group in Italy.

Hinduja Group was founded by Shri Paramnand Deepchand Hinduja in 1914 at Mumbai. Today Hinduja Group is a conglomerate with a presence in 25 countries and employs over 25,000 personnel worldwide. HG includes Transport, Energy, Information Technology, Agri Business, Project Development, Banking and Finance and Trading.

The company's promoters and their share holding details are LRLIH Limited, UK - 59.09%, Ashok Leyland - 21.01% and Public and Financial Institution - 19.90%.
