= Vayalathala =

Village in Pathanamthitta District, Kerala, India

Vayalathala is a village situated in the Pathanamthitta district of Kerala State in India.

== Location ==
Vayalathala place is situated 8 km from Ranni, 8 km from Kozhencherry and 8 km from the Pathanamthitta District headquarters. This village is under governance of Cherukole Grama Panchayat. Chakkappalam puthamon are the gateways to Vayalathala Gramam (from Ranny-Kozhencherry main road), Kudilumukku, Parankimanthodom, Thottungal padi, Palliyathu Padi, post office Padi are the common junctions in this locality.

== Geography ==
The terrain of the locality is mostly hilly with some paddy fields. The Majority of the population is Christian or Hindu. Aaduparakkaavu Mala Nada Devi temple is the ancient Hindu worship place. The concept "Mala Nada" symbolizes the heritage of ancient Dravidian culture. Three Orthodox churches, one Catholic church, one Marthoma Church, One C.S.I. church and a Pentecostal church are situated in this village.

== Schools ==
Three primary schools are functioning in this village and one government operated old age home at Puthmon Junction.

== Landmarks ==
The village has a post office, playground for volleyball (panchayath stadium) Primary health centre, Ayurvedic hospital, nursery school, Arts and Sports Club. The majority of the people cultivate rubber.

== Transport ==
There are a few private buses and a KSRTC bus from Pathanamthitta Depot operating in this area.
