= Gnayiru =

- Suburb
- Location within Chennai Location within Tamil Nadu Location within India
- Coordinates: 13.256050°N 80.204330°E
- Country: India
- State: Tamil Nadu
- District: Tiruvallur
- Taluk: Ponneri
- Metro: Chennai
- Elevation: 15 m (49 ft)

Population
  - Total: 4,516

Languages
  - Official: Tamil
- Time zone: UTC+5:30 (IST)
- PIN: 600067
- Telephone code: 044-xxxx
- Vehicle registration: TN-18-xxxx & TN-20-xxxx(old)
- Planning agency: CMDA
- City: Chennai
- Lok Sabha constituency: Thiruvallur
- Vidhan Sabha constituency: Ponneri

Gnayiru, is a neighborhood in Chennai, Tiruvallur district, located North of Chennai, a metropolitan city in Tamil Nadu, India.

Gnayiru has a historical Hindu temple viz., Pushparatheswarar temple, which is under the control of Hindu Religious and Charitable Endowments Department, Government of Tamil Nadu.
