= Minjur block =

The Minjur block is a revenue block in the Thiruvallur district of Tamil Nadu, India. It has a total of 56 panchayat villages.
