= Minjur =

Suburb of Chennai, India

- Suburb of Chennai
- Nickname: Vada Kanchi (North Kancheepuram)
- Location within Chennai Location within Tamil Nadu Location within India
- Coordinates: 13.27°N 80.27°E
- Country: India
- State: Tamil Nadu
- District: Thiruvallur
- Metro: Chennai

Government
  - Type: Town Panchayat

Area
  - Total: 8.28 km^{2} (3.20 sq mi)
- Elevation: 11 m (36 ft)

Population (2011)
  - Total: 28,816
  - Estimate (2024): 39,000
  - Density: 3,480/km^{2} (9,010/sq mi)

Languages
  - Official: Tamil
- Time zone: UTC+5:30 (IST)
- PIN: 601203
- Vehicle registration: TN-18

Minjur is a suburb located in the northern outskirts of Chennai, India. It is located in Thiruvallur district in the Indian state of Tamil Nadu. Minjur is called 'Vada Kanchi' meaning North Kanchipuram. The locality has two famous temples for Shiva and Vishnu, similar to Kanchipuram. The neighbourhood is served by Minjur railway station of the Chennai Suburban Railway Network.

== Geography ==
Minjur is located at 13.27°N 80.27°E. It has an average elevation of 11 metres (36 feet). Bordered by Ponneri in the north, Cholavaram in the west, Manali New Town, Manali and Thiruvottiyur in the south, it is situated about 25 km from north of Chennai and well connected to that city with roadways and railways.

Minjur is a well-developed suburb which comprises more than 20 villages around it, with most villages underdeveloped in terms of roads, schools, and other amenities. Minjur belongs to Ponneri taluk.

== Demographics ==
As of 2001 India census, Minjur had a population of 23,947. Males constitute 50% of the population and females 50%. Minjur has an average literacy rate of 77%, higher than the national average of 73%: male literacy is 84%, and female literacy is 71%. In Minjur, 10% of the population is under 6 years of age. Almost half the population dwells near and around Ponneri as almost all state government offices, magistrate, registrar office, and major banks are located at Ponneri. Minjur has a major vegetables market for people below the poverty line in the nearby villages. Minjur has also been a key residential area for many years for the Union Employees of Hinduja Group Companies located in Ennore and Tamil Nadu Electricity Board employees.

== Temples ==
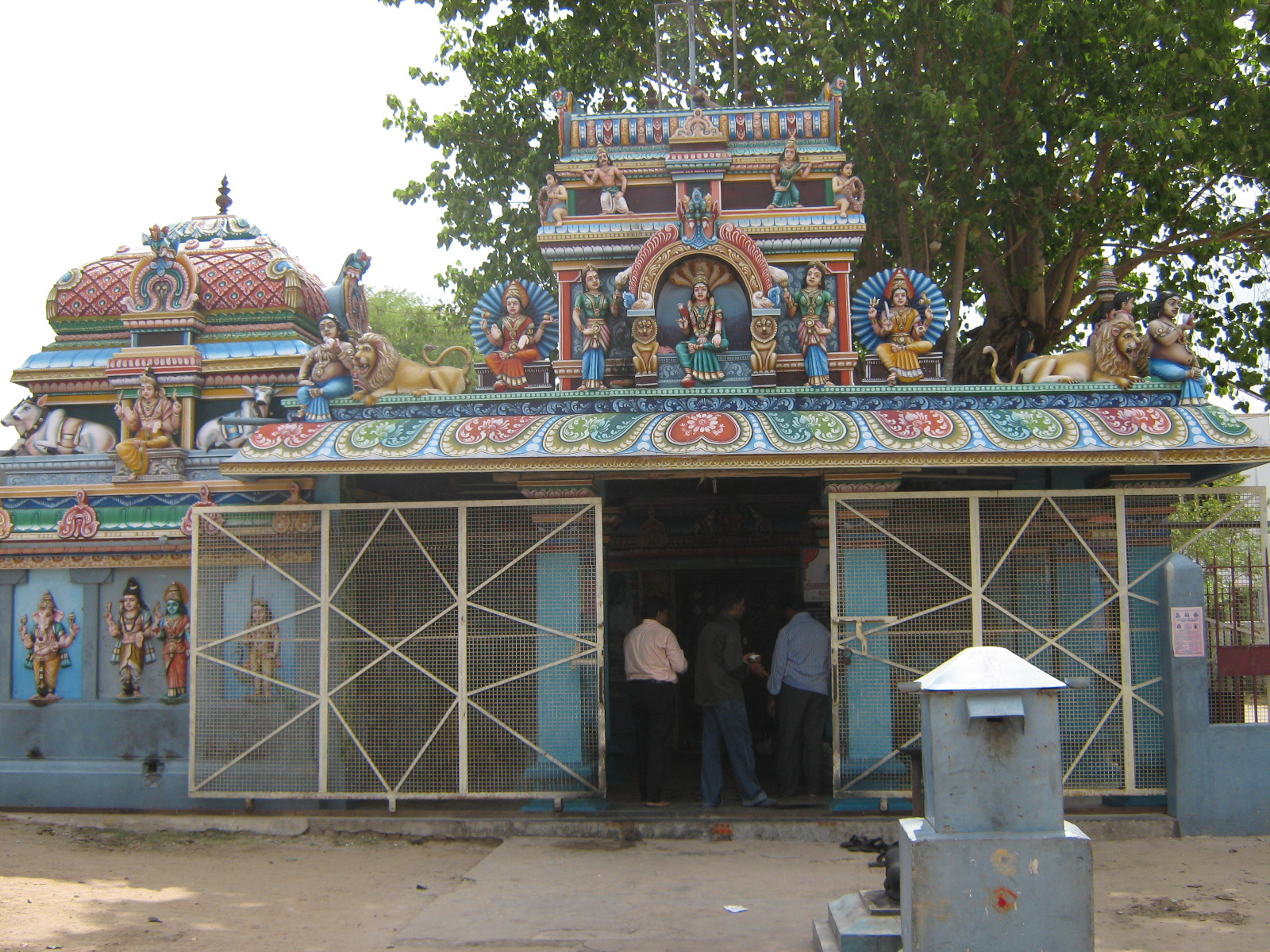
Pachaiamman Temple

1. Kamatchi Ekambaranathar Koil - situated in centre part of Minjur town.
2. Lord Shiva Temple
3. Minjur Varadaraja Perumal
4. Devadhanam Ranganathar Perumal Koil (5 km from North of Minjur in a small village named Devadhanam) on the way to "Neithavoyal".
5. BalaMurugan Tample ("Vallalar sabai" - minjur to kattur road 3 km distance in Neithavoyal)
6. Sri Panjamuga Gayathri Temple (Minjur to Kattur road 3 km distance in Neithavoyal)
7. Arulmigu Muppathamman Temple - Grama Devadai.
8. Arulmigu Ayyappa Temple
9. Anchunayar Temple
10. Pachai Amman Temple
11. Kulakarai Vinagayar Temple
12. Thirumanangeeswarar Temple -Thiruvudai Amman Temple (Ichcha Shakti) - 2 km from Minjur
13. Ellaiamman Temple
14. Mangalambikai Amman Temple
15. Sai Baba Temple - In Padmavathy Nagar
16. Sri Venugopalswamy Bajanai Mandhir, Venkata Reddy Palayam
17. Sri Varasitthi Vinayagar Temple, Venkata Reddy Palayam
18. Sri Karumari Amman Temple, Lakshmipuram 1st colony
19. Thai Moogambigai Temple, Ramana Nagar, B. D. Office
20. Sri Nagamallieswarar Sornambigai Temple, Nallur village
21. Sri Selva Vinagayar Temple, Nallur village
22. Sri Lakshmi Amman Temple, Nallur village
23. Sri Angala Amman Temple, Nallur village
24. Amudha Bala Abhirami Amman Temple, Balaji nagar
25. Sri Saelur Amman Temple, Nallur village
26. Semmavaram Jjalgandesawara Swamy Temple

== Educational institutions ==
- Shree Chandra Prabhu Jain College

== Growth ==
Minjur is one of the suburban places of Chennai which is highly growing in terms of Education, Industrialization, and Agriculture, which are expanding by leaps and bounds. Minjur, in its land area, is twice the size of Thiruvottiyur and thrice that of Ponneri which is very much near to Minjur.

The Minjur seawater desalination plant, which supplies 100 million litres a day water to Chennai city, was inaugurated on July 31, 2010.

Outer Ring Road (ORR) which connects southern Chennai (Vandalur on NH 45) to Minjur is a main part of the CMDA's Second Master Plan for the greater Chennai. Minjur can be reached using bus or train service.
