= Ponneri taluk =

Human settlement in India

Coordinates: 13.32°N 80.2°E

Ponneri is a taluk of Tiruvallur district of the Indian state of Tamil Nadu. The headquarters of the taluk is the town of Ponneri.

== Demographics ==
According to the 2011 census, the taluk of Ponneri had a population of 385,620 with 193,043 males and 192,577 females. There were 998 women for every 1000 men. The taluk had a literacy rate of 70.81. Child population in the age group below 6 was 19,639 Males and 18,808 Females.

== See also ==
- Devadhanam
- Madhavaram
- Seemapuram
