= Areas of Chennai =

Areas within Chennai, India

The city of Chennai is classified into three regions: North Chennai, Central Chennai and South Chennai. It is further divided into 15 zones, consisting of 200 wards.

Location
Adambakkam
Adyar
Alandur
Alapakkam
Alwarpet
Alwarthirunagar
Ambattur
Aminjikarai
Anna Nagar
Annanur
Arumbakkam
Ashok Nagar
Avadi
Ayanavaram
Beemannapettai
Besant Nagar
Basin Bridge
Chepauk
Chetput
Chintadripet
Chitlapakkam
Choolai
Choolaimedu
Chrompet
Egmore
Ekkaduthangal
Eranavur
Ennore
Foreshore Estate
Fort St. George
George Town
Gopalapuram
Government Estate
Guindy
Guduvancheri
IIT Madras
Injambakkam
ICF
Iyyapanthangal
Jafferkhanpet
Kadambathur
Karapakkam
Kattivakkam
Kattupakkam
Kazhipattur
K.K. Nagar
Keelkattalai
Kattivakkam
Kilpauk
Kodambakkam
Kodungaiyur
Kolathur
Korattur
Korukkupet
Kottivakkam
Kotturpuram
Kottur
Kovur
Koyambedu
Kundrathur
Madhavaram
Madhavaram Milk Colony
Madipakkam
Madambakkam
Maduravoyal
Manali
Manali New Town
Manapakkam
Mandaveli
Mangadu
Mannadi
Mathur
Medavakkam
Meenambakkam
MGR Nagar
Minjur
Mogappair
MKB Nagar
Mount Road
Moolakadai
Moulivakkam
Mugalivakkam
Mudichur
Mylapore
Nandanam
Nanganallur
Nanmangalam
Neelankarai
Nemilichery
Nesapakkam
Nolambur
Noombal
Nungambakkam
Otteri
Padi
Pakkam
Palavakkam
Pallavaram
Pallikaranai
Pammal
Park Town
Parry's Corner
Pattabiram
Pattaravakkam
Pazhavanthangal
Peerkankaranai
Perambur
Peravallur
Perumbakkam
Perungalathur
Perungudi
Pozhichalur
Poonamallee
Porur
Pudupet
Pulianthope
Purasaiwalkam
Puthagaram
Puzhal
Puzhuthivakkam - Ullagaram
Raj Bhavan
Ramavaram
Red Hills
Royapettah
Royapuram
Saidapet
Saligramam
Santhome
Sembakkam
Selaiyur
Sithalapakkam
Shenoy Nagar
Sholavaram
Sholinganallur
Sikkarayapuram
Sowcarpet
St.Thomas Mount
Surapet
Tambaram
Teynampet
Tharamani
T. Nagar
Thirumangalam
Thirumullaivoyal
Thiruneermalai
Thiruninravur
Thiruvanmiyur
Thiruvallur
Tiruverkadu
Thiruvotriyur
Thuraipakkam
Tirusulam
Tiruvallikeni
Tondiarpet
United India Colony
Vandalur
Vadapalani
Valasaravakkam
Vallalar Nagar
Vanagaram
Velachery
Velappanchavadi
Villivakkam
Virugambakkam
Vyasarpadi
Washermanpet
West Mambalam
