= Central Chennai =

Part of Chennai city

Map view of Chennai Central

Central Chennai is the part of Chennai city between the Coovum River and the Adyar River. The term "Central Chennai" has gained currency in recent times with the rapid expansion of Chennai city southwards.

== Neighbourhoods of Central Chennai ==
Until the end of the 20th century, the suburbs that comprise Central Chennai were usually grouped under South Chennai and it is still a common practice to do so.

The central part of Chennai has considerably higher standards of living than North Chennai and the city's "old elite" resided here. It includes Rutland Gate Road in Nungambakkam, Poes Garden in Alwarpet and the Boat Club Road in Raja Annamalaipuram that have the highest real estate prices in Chennai. The eastern neighbourhoods of Mylapore, Alwarpet, Teynampet and Nandanam are peopled mostly by lawyers, industrialists and white collar professionals while the adjoining T. Nagar functions as the business district. The central neighbourhoods also comprise the city's cultural epicentre. The Tamil film industry is based at Kodambakkam with people connected with the motion picture and television residing in the immediate vicinity. However, conversely, parts of Royapettah, Triplicane, Mandaveli and Saidapet have slums and poor infrastructure with standards of living comparable to North Chennai.

== History ==
Prior to 1800, the region to the south of the Coovum River was known as the "Great Choultry Plain" and was dotted with choultries for travellers and pilgrims to St. Thomas Mount. The choultry plain grew to be a favourite with East India Company bureaucrats and industry captains who detested the noise and congestion of Georgetown. They lived in relative privacy in their vast garden houses in rural surroundings.

By the early 1900s, however, Broadway was deemed too congested and unhygienic and Mount Road had outstripped it as the fashionable shopping district for the European elite.

The eastern neighbourhoods of Royapettah, Triplicane and Chepauk had long made up the city's Muslim quarter.

During the last half of the 19th century, a rapidly growing Indian elite made up mostly of lawyers, judges and civil servants, began settling in Mylapore and Alwarpet.

== See also ==
- North Chennai
- South Chennai
- South Mumbai
