= MGR Nagar =

M.G.R. Nagar
- neighbourhood
- Location within Chennai Location within Tamil Nadu Location within India
- Coordinates: 13.035°N 80.197°E
- Country: India
- State: Tamil Nadu
- District: Chennai District
- Metro: Chennai
- Wards: 137 & 138
- Named for: Ex - CM of tamilnadu (Mr M.G Ramachandran)

Government
  - Body: Chennai Corporation

Languages
  - Official: Tamil
- Time zone: UTC+5:30 (IST)
- Lok Sabha constituency: Chennai South
- Vidhan Sabha constituency: Virugambakkam
- Planning agency: CMDA
- Civic agency: Chennai Corporation
- Website: www.chennai.tn.nic.in

M.G.R. Nagar (shortened from M. G. Ramachandran Nagar) is a neighbourhood located in Chennai, India. The area is known for its busy vegetable market and fish market.

== Location ==
M.G.R Nagar is situated to the south of Anna Main Road in K. K. Nagar in Chennai. It is surrounded by K. K. Nagar in the north, Nesapakkam in the West, Adyar River in the south and Jafferkhanpet in the South East.

== Transportation ==
All the MTC buses originating or terminating at K.K. Nagar bus terminus ply through MGR Nagar's Three bus stops (M.G.R Nagar Market, Data Udipi Stop and Ajantha Stop) on the Anna Main road provide access to the neighbourhood. A number of share autos ply frequently to this area and beyond from Udayam Theatre Junction in Ashok Nagar.

== Public services ==
An M.G.R. Nagar Police station (R10) is located at Venkataraman road.

== Events ==
In October 2005, 42 people died in a stampede among the 4000 people who had gathered for flood relief distribution.
