= Melatirupati =

Sri Venkatesa Perumal Temple
- Sri Srinivasa Perumal Kovil
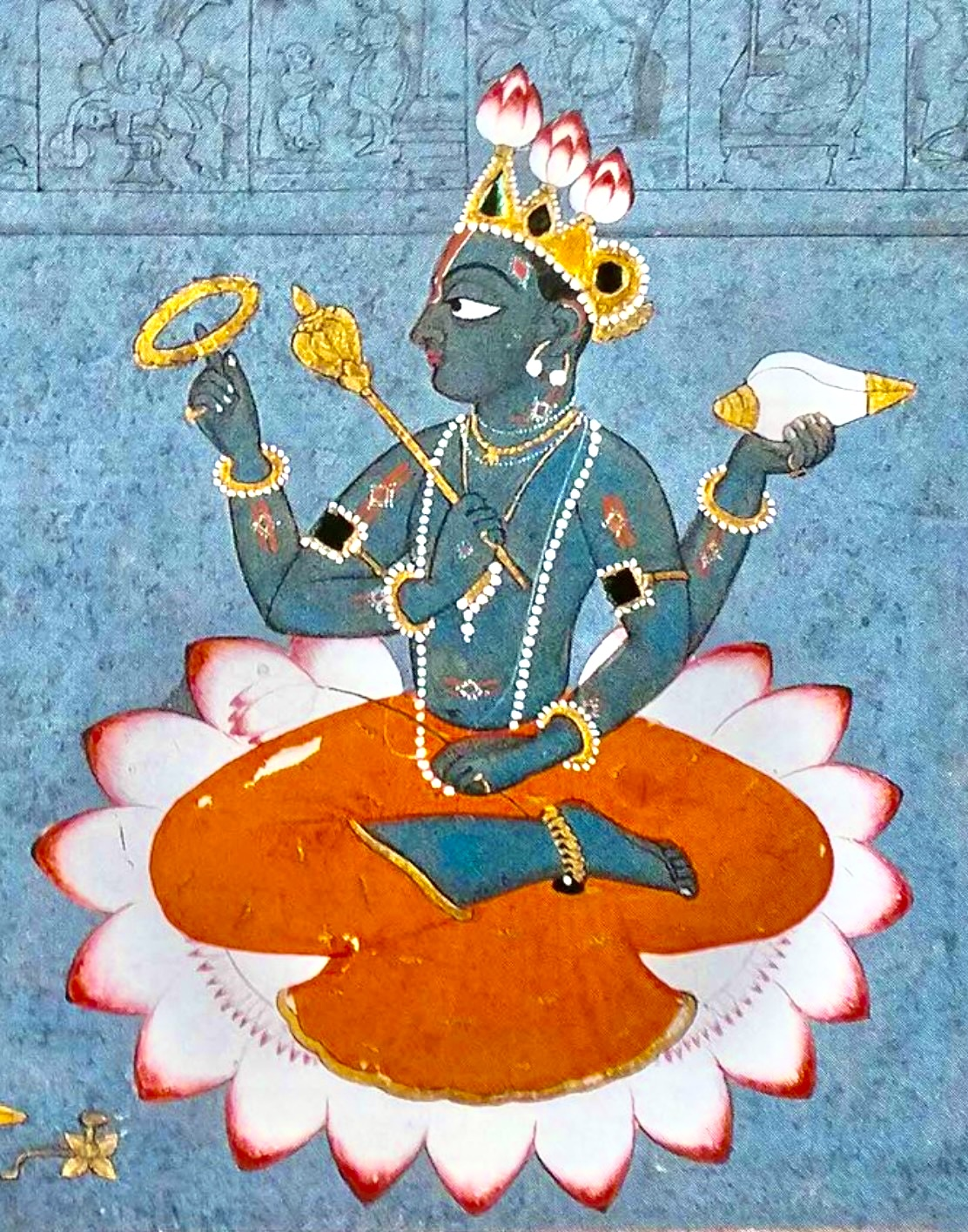
- Lord Vishnu, the chief deity at the temple

Religion
- Affiliation: Hinduism
- District: Chennai
- Deity: Sri Venkatesa Perumal

Location
- Location: Medavakkam
- State: Tamil Nadu
- Country: India

Architecture
- Type: Dravidian architecture

Melatirupati is a hindu temple located in Chennai, Tamil Nadu, India. It is dedicated to the Hindu god Venkatesa Perumal.

== Location ==
The temple is located on Pillayar Koil Street at Medavakkam, a southern neighbourhood of Chennai.

== Devotion ==
The temple, also called Mela Tirupati, an abode of Sri Srinivasa Perumal (Lord Balaji). The "Dwajasthambam" is seen at the entrance. The Bali Peetam and the Kodi Maram (flag post) are seen at the entrance. Further ahead is "Garuda Alwar" praying to the Lord with folded hands facing the main deity. Next to Sri Srinivasa Perumal is Padmasani Thayar and Andal in separate shrines.

== Other shrines ==
There is Sri Hanuman opposite to goddess Padamasani and Ramar Padugai (feet) opposite to Andal. As one goes around the sanctum there are separate shrines for Varahar, Narasimhar, Venugopalar, Ramar and Chkaratalwar. There is a Ganesha temple and Sakthi temple outside the main temple. There are also utsava murthis of alwars and acharyas.

== Samprokshanam ==
The most recent samprokshanam took place on 8 April 2015.
