= Periya Kuppam, Ennore =

- Neighbourhood
- Periya Kuppam, Ennore, Chennai, Tamil Nadu
- Coordinates: 13.2121°N 80.3242°E
- Country: India
- State: Tamil Nadu
- Elevation: 28.64 m (94.0 ft)

Languages
  - Official: Tamil, English
  - Speech: Tamil, English
- Time zone: UTC+5:30 (IST)
- PIN: 600057
- Other Neighbourhoods: Ennore, Kathivakkam
- Corporation: Greater Chennai Corporation
- LS: Chennai North
- VS: Thiruvottiyur

Periya Kuppam is a fishing village near Ennore in Chennai of Tamil Nadu state in the peninsular India.

== Location ==
Periya Kuppam is located at an altitude of about 28.64 metres (94.0 ft) above the mean sea level with the geographic coordinates of 13.2121°N 80.3242°E near Ennore.

Periya Kuppam, Ennore (Tamil Nadu)

== Gas leakage ==
On 26 December 2023, there was an Ammonia gas leakage happened from Coromandel International Limited, the facility which produces Ammonia related chemicals, located near Periya Kuppam. Due to this incident, the operations of the industrial unit was suspended by the Tamil Nadu Pollution Control Board.
