= Perumbakkam =

- Town
- Location within Chennai Location within Tamil Nadu Location within India
- Coordinates: 12.9053°N 80.1986°E
- Country: India
- State: Tamil Nadu
- District: Chengalpattu
- City: Tambaram
- Metro: Chennai

Languages
  - Official: Tamil
- Time zone: UTC+5:30 (IST)
- PIN: 600100
- Vehicle registration: TN-14

Perumbakkam is a suburb of the southern Indian city of Chennai in Chengalpattu district.

Perumbakkam will be part of Tambaram City Municipal Corporation.

== Location ==
It is bound by Sholinganallur to the east, Semmencherry to the south, Medavakkam to the north and Sithalapakkam to the west. It is only a few kilometers from the fast developing IT corridor OMR of Chennai. ELCOT SEZ Campus which hosts major IT service providers like HCL, Wipro, Tech Mahindra, Cognizant among others is closer to Perumbakkam. Perumbakkam is connected to Tambaram through the Velachery-Tambaram road and to Sholinganallur through the Medavakkam-Sholinganallur road.

The Great Trigonometrical Survey, a Survey of India initiative to survey the whole land mass of India was started from the measurement of a small section of plain land with Perumbakkam Hill on the southern end by Major Lambton in 1802 CE.

== Perumbakkam lake ==
The Perumbakkam lake spreads over 200 acres (0.81 km^{2}) and is a vital source of water to residents and farmers in Perumbakkam, Vengaivaasal and Sithalapakkam village(s). Nearly 100 families raise vegetables and other crops whenever water is available in the lake.
