= Kathivakkam railway station =

Railway station in Chennai, India

Kathivakkam
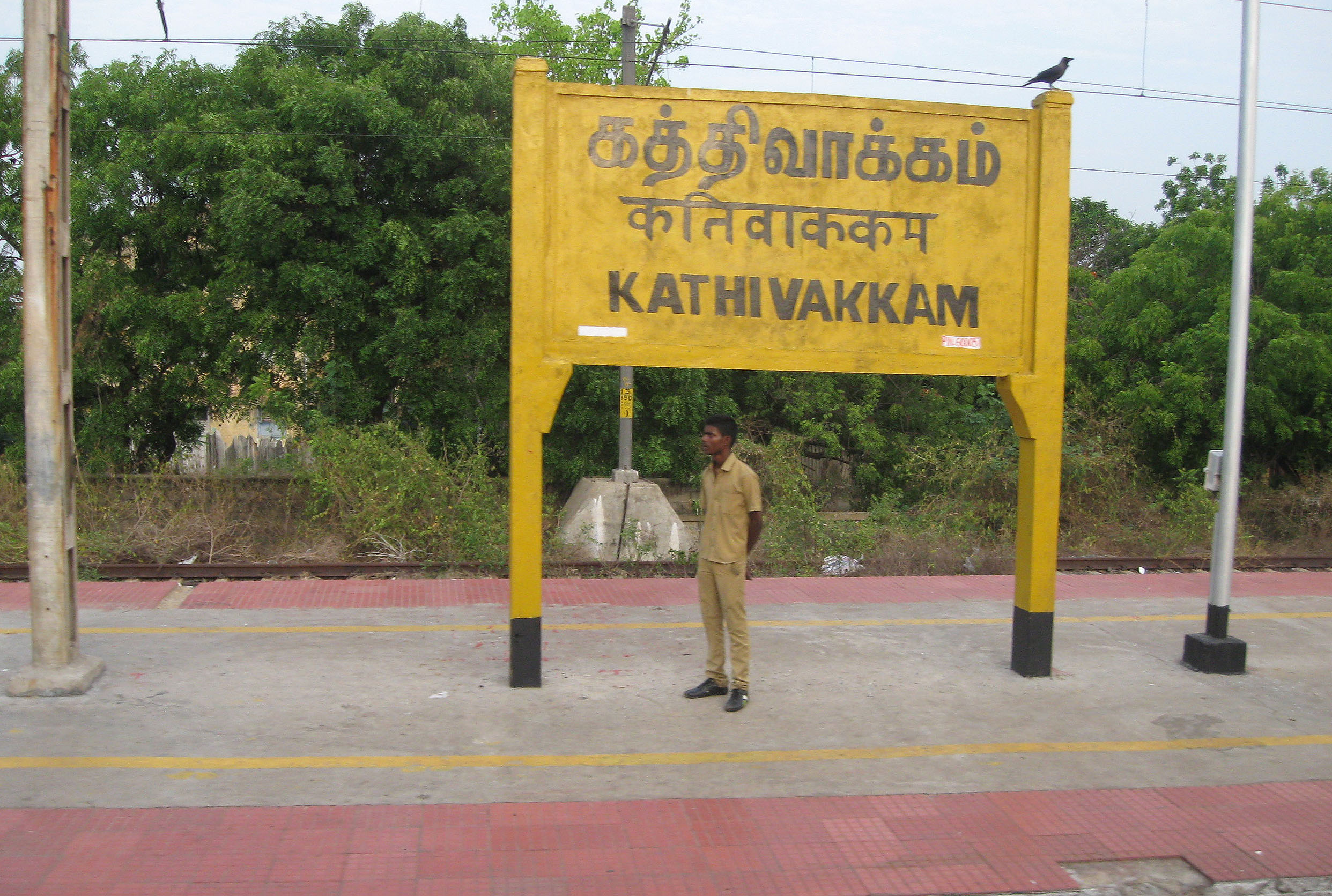
- A passenger waits for a local train at Kathivakkam Railway Station

General information
- Location: Kathivakkam, Chennai, Tamil Nadu, India
- Coordinates: 13°12′16″N 80°19′0″E
- System: Indian Railways and Chennai Suburban Railway station
- Owner: Ministry of Railways, Indian Railways
- Line: North line of Chennai Suburban Railway

Construction
- Structure type: Standard on-ground station
- Parking: Available

Other information
- Station code: KAVM
- Fare zone: Southern Railways

History
- Electrified: 13 April 1979
- Former names: South Indian Railway
Location
- Location within India Location within Tamil Nadu

Kathivakkam railway station is one of the railway station of the Chennai Central–Gummidipoondi section of the Chennai Suburban Railway Network. It serves the neighbourhood of Kathivakkam, a suburb of Chennai, and is located 14 km north of Chennai Central railway station. It has an elevation of 9 m above sea level.

== History ==
The lines at the station were electrified on 13 April 1979, with the electrification of the Chennai Central–Gummidipoondi section.

== Gallery ==
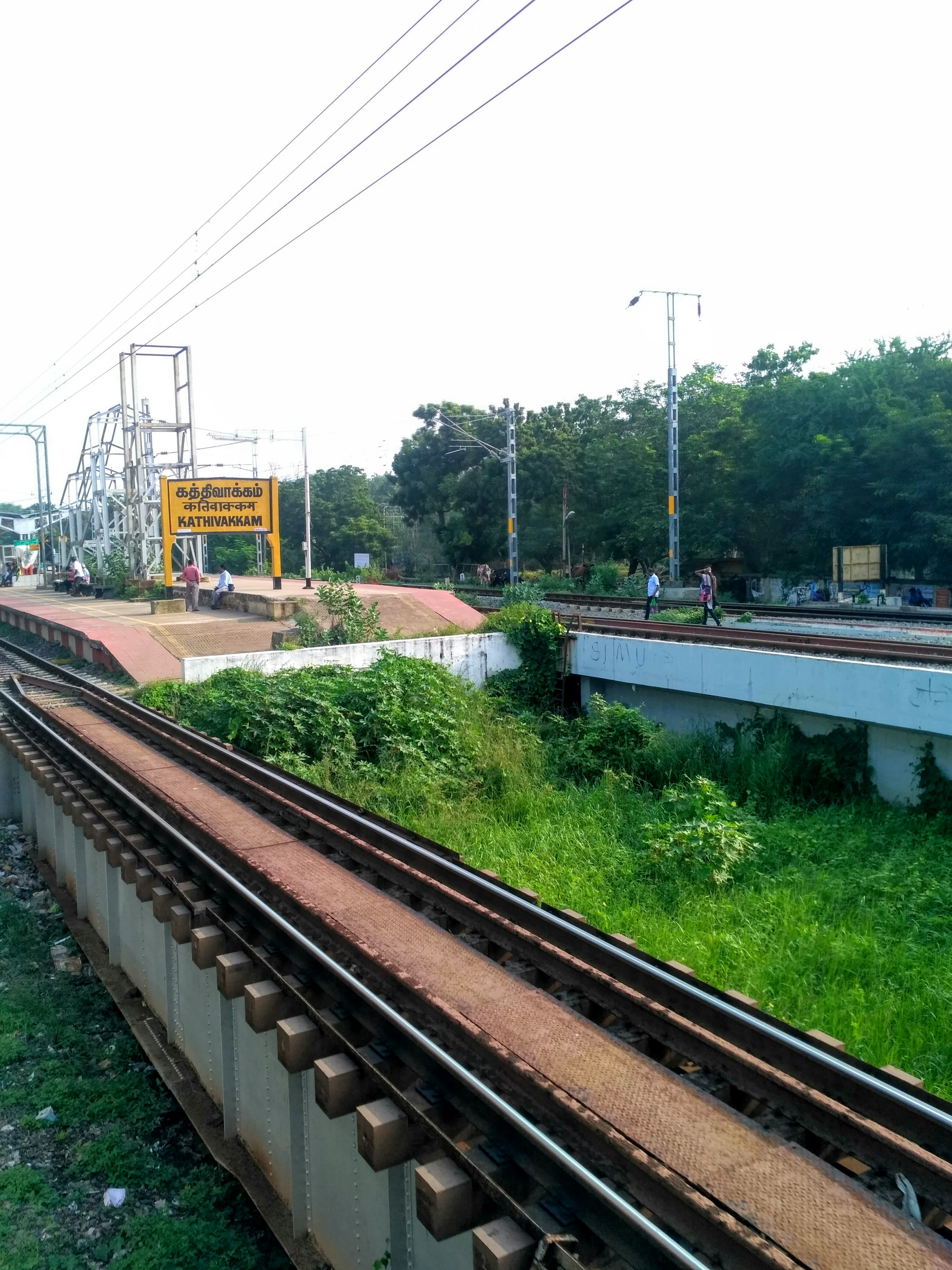

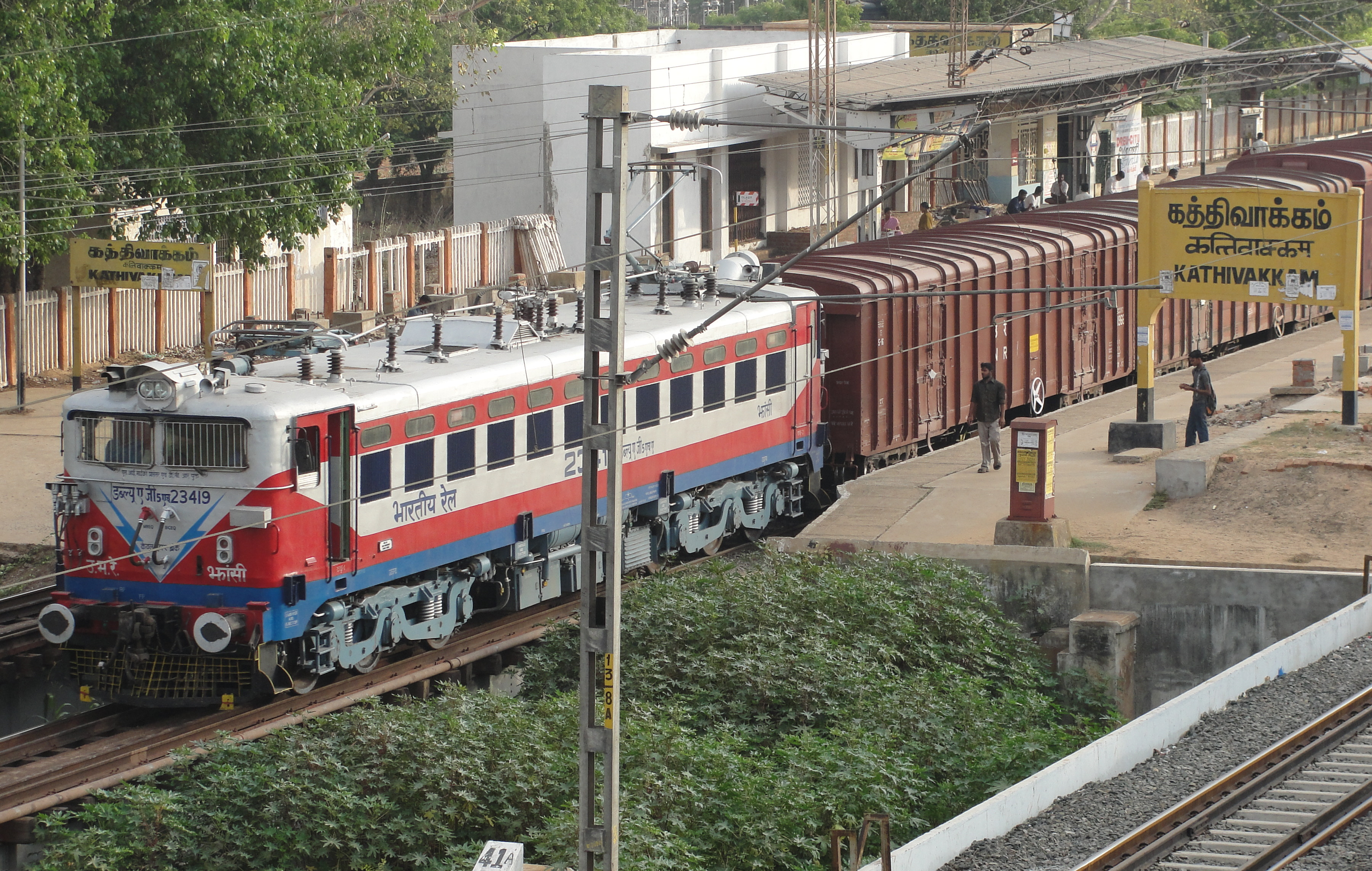
A WAG5 Loco with a freight train at Kathivakkam railway station

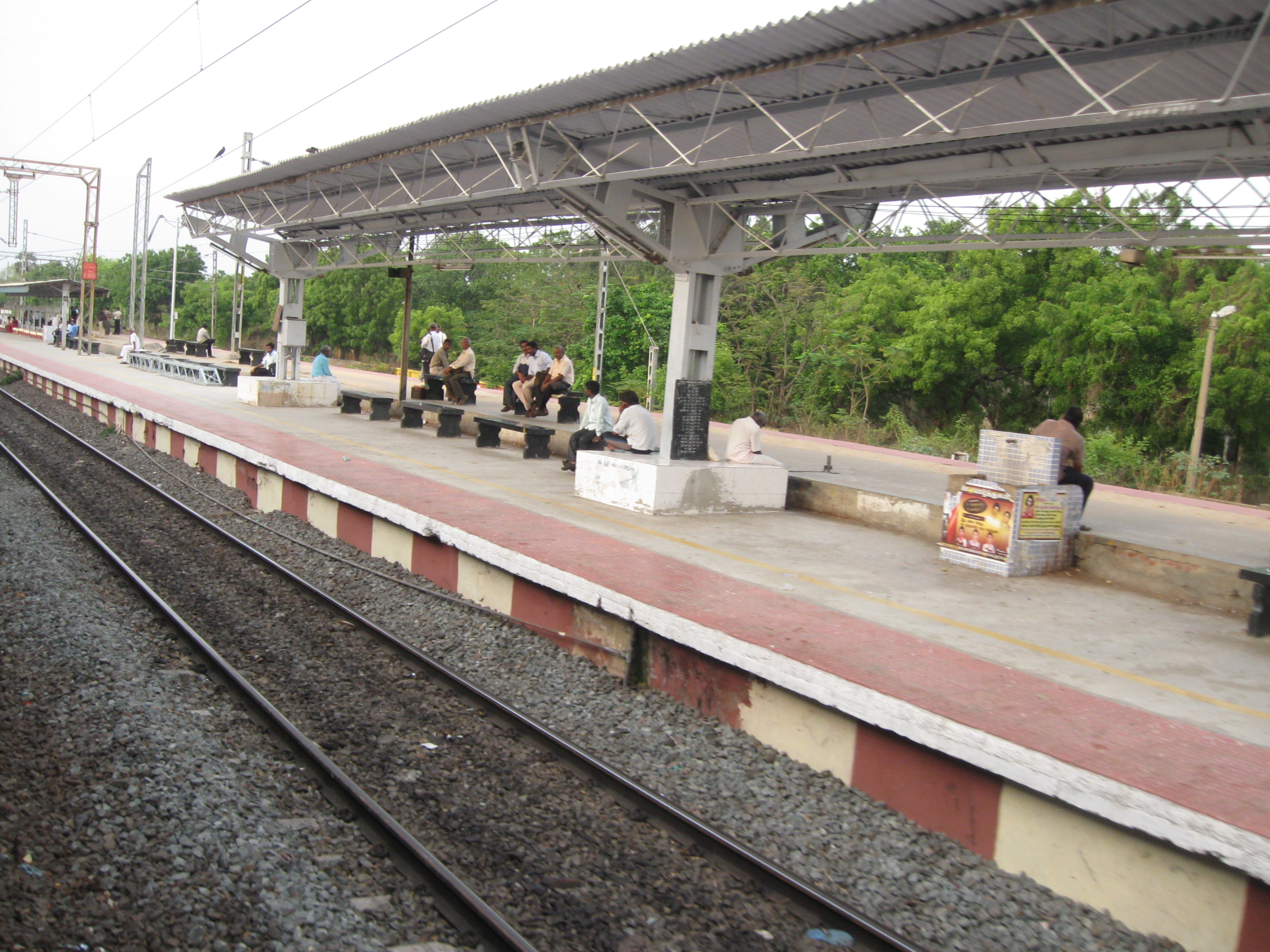
People wait on platform no.2 of Kathivakkam Railway Station

== See also ==
- Chennai Suburban Railway
- Railway stations in Chennai
