= Puthagaram, Chennai =

Puthagaram
- Neighbourhood
- Location within Chennai
- Coordinates: 13.140251°N 80.18808°E
- Country: India
- State: Tamil Nadu
- District: Chennai
- Metro: Chennai
- Zone: Madhavaram Zone No 3
- Ward: Puthagaram (Ward 24)
- Elevation: 7 m (23 ft)

Languages
  - Official: Tamil
- Time zone: UTC+5:30 (IST)
- PIN: 600099
- Telephone code: 044
- Vehicle registration: TN-05-xxxx
- Planning agency: CMDA
- City: Chennai
- Lok Sabha constituency: Thiruvallur
- Vidhan Sabha constituency: Madhavaram

Puthagaram has developed from being a rural area along the Redhills high road to become one of the important residential localities of Chennai. It was a village panchayat till October 2011.Now as per a G.O., Puthagaram has become a part of the zone 3, Madhavaram, of the Chennai Corporation.Though Puthagaram has escalated itself from being a less-known suburb to a nominally decent suburban centre it still has not grown on par with the other localities in Chennai itself. For instance it still lacks proper roads and connectivity albeit the Corporation of Chennai has been carrying on various infrastructure projects in full-swing which are expected to reach completion soon.

A possible expansion of Chennai city limits from 174 km^{2} to 430 km^{2} may require merger of several suburbs, and Puthagaram panchayath is likely to be detached from Madhavaram.
