= North Chennai =

Northern part of Chennai city

North Chennai is a geographic term used to refer to the northern part of Chennai city. Though its definition has varied with time and context, it is generally accepted among historians that North Chennai is used for the part of Chennai city situated north of the Coovum River. Encompassing the Fort St George and Georgetown areas from which the city originated, North Chennai is generally considered an area of stagnant growth. The area is generally notorious for its thick population, narrow roads, slums and working-class neighbourhoods, poor infrastructure, and high incidence of crime. This characterization is, however, limited to older neighbourhoods close to the sea coast as new areas to the west, like Kilpauk, Purasawalkam, Anna Nagar and parts of Egmore have comparatively good standards of living and acquired desirability as residential areas.

Northwards of Georgetown, extends the Anglo-Indian settlement of Royapuram and the historical town of Thiruvottiyur beyond which North Madras gives way to a series of fishing hamlets, individually known as kuppam in Tamil. The Red Hills region is known for the Pulhal Lake and the central prison. The port of Ennore located 16 kilometres supplements Chennai Port as a major entrepot for trading vessels. Northwards lie Minjur, Ennore and Thiruvottiyur. Westwards lie the industrial suburbs of Padi, Ambattur Avadi and Thiruninravur. The head office will be at Tondiarpet, was comprise Tiruvottiyur, Tondiarpet, Madhavaram, Perambur and Purasawalkam taluks.

== History ==
North Chennai originated with the founding of an East India Company factory in the village of Madrasapatnam. The grant was confirmed on 22 August 1639 which is generally considered the date of the city's founding and celebrated as Madras Day and the signatories were Francis Day for the East India Company and Damera Venkata Nayaka a Padmanyaka Velama ruler for the Vijayanagar Empire. The construction of a small fort was started in 1640 and completed by 1652. This would, by the end of the 18th century, with significant alterations and expansions, become the Fort St George that we know today. Prior to the city's founding, fishing hamlets existed in the area.

== See also ==
- Central Chennai
- South Chennai
- East End of London
