= Sikkarayapuram =

Sikkarayapuram Chikkarayapuram
- Sub Urban
- Sikkarayapuram
- Location in Tamil Nadu, India Sikkarayapuram (Tamil Nadu) Sikkarayapuram (India)
- Coordinates: 13.02°N 80.10°E
- Country: India
- State: Tamil Nadu
- Metro: Chennai

Government
  - Type: Panchayat Villages
  - Body: Mangadu Municipality

Population (2001)
  - Total: 5,807

Languages
  - Official: Tamil
- Time zone: UTC+5:30 (IST)
- PIN: 600069
- Vehicle registration: TN-85

Sikkarayapuram, also known as Chikkarayapuram, is part of the Mangadu municipality and located in west of Chennai, India Indian state of Tamil Nadu.

== Demographics ==
As of 2001 India census, Sikkarayapuram had a population of 5807. Males constitute 53% of the population and females 47%. Sikkarayapuram has an average literacy rate of 55%, lower than the national average of 59.5%: male literacy is 62%, and female literacy is 48%. In Sikkarayapuram, 15% of the population is under 6 years of age.
