= Sithalapakkam =

Neighborhood of Chennai, India

- neighbourhood
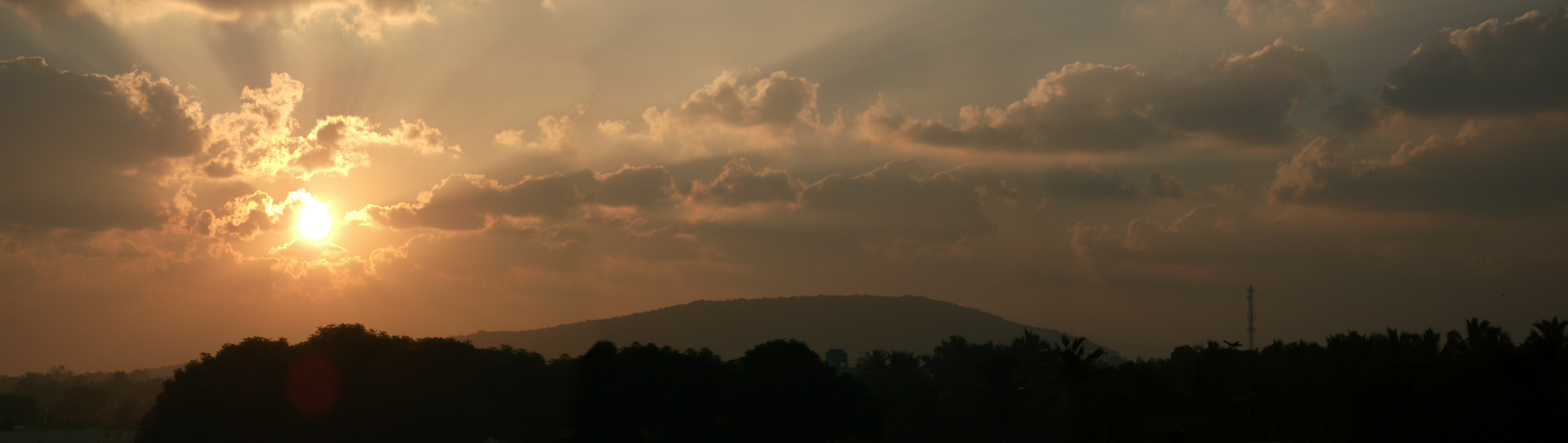
- Sunrise in Sithalapakkam

- Location within Chennai Location within Tamil Nadu Location within India
- Coordinates: 12.883333°N 80.183333°E
- Country: India
- State: Tamil Nadu
- Metro: Chennai
- City: Tambaram

Languages
  - Official: Tamil
- Time zone: UTC+5:30 (IST)
- PIN: 600126
- Vehicle registration: TN-14
- Lok Sabha constituency: Chennai South
- Vidhan Sabha constituency: Sholinganallur

Sithalapakkam is a residential locality, south of Chennai, India. It is about 3 km away from Medavakkam. Sithalapakkam is surrounded by two lakes and a hill. Some portion of this hill is cutout for sand and stone. Wild birds can be seen at Sithalapakkam. Though some buildings have erupted in the region, most of Sithalapakkam has tar or concrete roads and bus service to Tambaram, T. Nagar, Broadway and more also has started. It is to be pursued that the place has got access from all 3 sides public transport viz Arasankazhani on South and Chemmanjery in North. Further Perumbakkam bus depot also is at walkable distance. Sithalapakkam will be part of Tambaram City Municipal Corporation.

It is often confused with Chitlapakkam (Tamil: சிட்லப்பாக்கம்), which is an older neighbourhood, more established and closer to Tambaram. In general, Sithalapakkam has full-powered electricity due to the presence of the Chemmanjery substation, and undamaged roads.

== Places near Sithalapakkam ==
- Arasankalani
- Sankarapuram
- Vijay Avenue
- Vedanthangal nagar
- Medavakkam
- Vengaivaasal
- Madambakkam
- Perumbakkam
- Maduraipakkam
- Semmancheri
- Sholinganallur
- Ponmar
- Ottiyambakkam
- Thalambur
- Karanai
- Navalur
- Siruseri
