= Mandavelli =

Mandaveli
- Neighbourhood
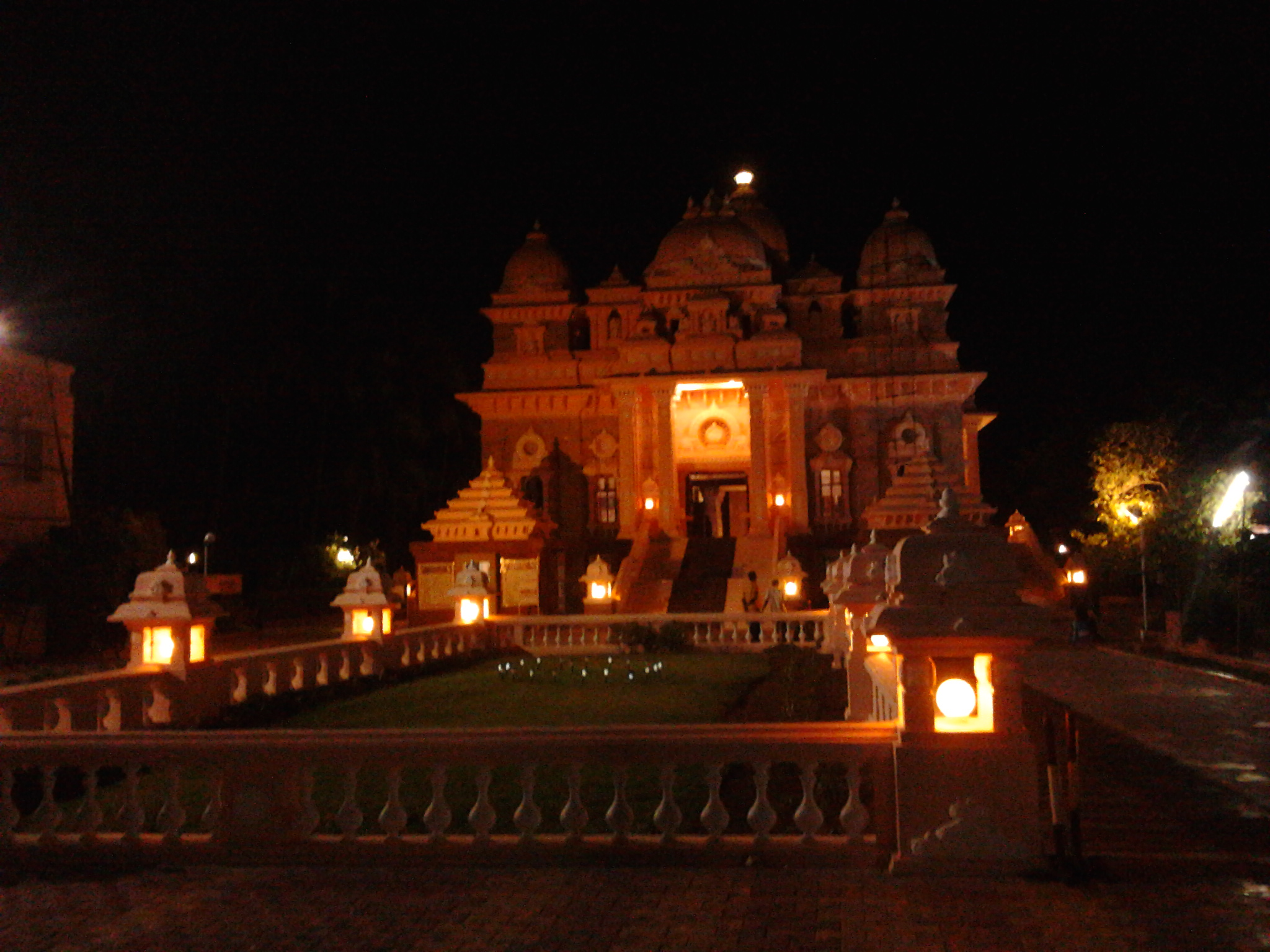
- Ramakrishna Math, one of the main landmarks of Mandaveli

- Location within Chennai Location within Tamil Nadu Location within India
- Coordinates: 13.0270°N 80.2602°E
- Country: India
- State: Tamil Nadu
- District: Chennai District
- Metro: Chennai

Government
  - Body: Chennai Corporation

Languages
  - Official: Tamil
- Time zone: UTC+5:30 (IST)
- PIN: 600 028
- Vehicle registration: TN-06
- Planning agency: CMDA
- Civic agency: Chennai Corporation
- Website: www.chennai.tn.nic.in

Mandaveli (also known as Mandavelli or Mandavelipakkam) is a neighborhood in Chennai, India. It is also termed usually as Mandavelipakkam which in the Tamil language "Mandhai" is 'herd of cattle' and "Veli" is 'grassland'.

== Location ==
Mandaveli is located close to the locality of Mylapore. It is bordered by Mylapore in the north, Santhome (and MRC Nagar) in the east and RA Puram in the south and in the west. It derives its name from a literal translation with reference to the rearing of cows "mandhai" meaning - "herd" and " Veli" which means open space in Tamil. On the west side it is surrounded by Alwarpet. Mandaveli is predominantly a residential area with the main "landmarks" being the 150-year-old Kapali talkies, the Airtel regional office of Tamil Nadu, the Ponds regional head office, Hindustan Lever, and others like Greenways road & boat club. Due to its proximity to the temple dense Mylapore, Mandaveli is home to a large number of Brahmins. Mandavelipakkam is seen as a residential and business area located between Santhome (which is home to the San Thome Basilica) to the north and Adyar to its south. St. John's high school is a prominent educational institution in this area. Mandaveli MRTS station is built on the MRTS railway line which connects it to Chennai central beach station at the north end and Velachery to the south. Several old buildings are being demolished to make way for newer structures like the Kabali Theatre, which is located near Mandaveli bus stand has been changed into a big apartment. And some other residential buildings also have been changed for business structures.

To the east is Karpagam Avenue, a primarily residential area that contains the India Cements Towers. Adjacent to Karpagam Avenue is Mayor Ramanathan Chettiar Nagar (MRC Nagar), a developing mixed-use area along the coast. Notable corporate facilities and landmarks in MRC Nagar include the Sun TV Network (located in the Murasoli Maran Towers), TVH Bellicia Tower, The India Cements Building and iconic Mayor Ramanathan Chettiar Marriage Hall and Conference Centre are a few important buildings located here. The JW Marriott Hotel and Leela Palace Hotel are some of the notable landmarks.
