= JW Marriott Chennai =

Building in India

JW Marriott Hotel Chennai
- Hotel chain: JW Marriott

General information
- Location: India, Premises No. 4288/12 & 4288/107, Block 94, MRC Nagar, Raja Annamalai Puram; Chennai, Tamil Nadu
- Coordinates: 13.018325°N 80.273645°E
- Opening: Never opened
- Owner: Viceroy Hotels Ltd
- Operator: Marriott International

Technical details
- Floor count: 16
- Floor area: 400,000 sq ft

Design and construction
- Architect: CRN

Other information
- Number of rooms: 357

Website
- www.marriott.com

JW Marriott Chennai was a five-star luxury hotel under construction in Chennai, India. The 357-room hotel, being built at MRC Nagar on the seafront of Chennai facing the Bay of Bengal near the Adyar estuary, is being developed at a cost of ₹ 6,200 million and forms part of Marriott International Inc. Initially planned to open in 2005, the project was delayed due to lack of funds and regulatory issues.

== History ==
The hotel was planned in 1998. The design consultant of the project was BBG, based in New York City. C. R. Narayana Rao (CRN) Group was the local architect and structural and civil engineers group for the project. The hotel group initially announced to start the construction of the luxury hotel, promoted by Hyderabad-based Viceroy Hotels Ltd, in late 2002 and complete the project by 2005. However, construction work started in 2005 at an initial cost of ₹ 4,900 million. The project was then delayed for several reasons including obtaining permissions from the local administrative bodies.

By March 2011, however, the Viceroy Hotels Limited was planning to spin off the ₹ 5.6 billion (US$125 million) Chennai property, still under construction, to raise cash in order to clear its accrued debts. In April, the company signed an agreement with the Chennai-based Mahal Hotels. In May 2013, Viceroy Hotels decided to sell the property to Ceebros Hotels Private Limited for ₹ 4,800 million.

== See also ==
- Hotels in Chennai
- Marriott Hotels
- Marriott International
