= Beemannapettai =

Ward of Chennai, Tamil Nadu, India

Beemannapettai is a ward of Chennai, Tamil Nadu, India. It is ward 142 of Zone 10 of Chennai Corporation. Much of Alwarpet and Abiramapuram come under the Beemannapettai ward.
