= Kazhipattur =

Village in Chennai district

Kazhipattur is located in the Chennai district of Tamil Nadu, India. It is located on the Old Mahabalipuram Road near Padur and Egattur. The name is derived from goddess Kali in the ancient Brihadeeswarar Temple.
