= Pakkam =

Pakkam, Chennai
- suburb of Chennai
- Location in Chennai, India
- Coordinates: 13.1436°N 80.0280°E
- Country: India
- State: Tamil Nadu
- District: Thiruvallur
- Metro: Chennai

Languages
  - Official: Tamil
- Time zone: UTC+5:30 (IST)

Pakkam is a village which is located in Chennai in the Thiruvallur District in the Indian state of Tamil Nadu. It is situated around 34 km from Chennai. Pakkam comes under Chennai Metropolitan Area and it is very close to Thirunindravur which has frequent train services.

Pakkam is an agricultural village with many temples, including Anjaneyar Temple, Sri Ellaiamman Temple, Vinayagar Temple, Sri Balambikai Samedha Thazhuvakozhundeeswarar (Sivan) Temple and Sri Sridevi Boodevi Samedha Kariamanicka Perumal Temple. A very old Chola Period temple is Aanadhieswar Temple, built 1500 years ago, for Guru Talam. Kallaa Mrram Lord Dhakshnamurthi, and Guru Parikara Thalam are available in this area.

== Transport ==
Buses serving Pakkam:

- 65C --> Ambattur Ind. Estate to Pakkam
- 563 --> Ambattur Estate - Periyapalayam via Pakkam
- 580 --> Avadi - Arani
- 580p --> Poonamallee to Periyapalayam via Thiruninravur
- 65D --> Avadi to Melkondaiyur via Nathambedu Road Jn, Pakkam Village, Sirukalathur
- M65H --> Avadi via Pakkam to Redhills via Tamaraipakkam
