= Kathivakkam =

Katthivakkam ennore
- Neighbourhood
- Location in Chennai (North), Tamil Nadu, India Katthivakkam (Tamil Nadu) Katthivakkam (India)
- Coordinates: 13.204602°N 80.316740°E
- Country: India
- State: Tamil Nadu
- District: Chennai
- Taluk: Tiruvottiyur
- Metro: Chennai
- Local body: Greater Chennai Corporation
- Other neighbourhoods: Ennore, Periya Kuppam
- Elevation: 13 m (43 ft)

Population (2011)
  - Total: 36,617

Languages
  - Official: Tamil
- Time zone: UTC+5:30 (IST)
- PIN: 600057
- Vehicle registration: TN-18

Katthivakkam is an residential and industrial area located in the northern part of Chennai. It is a part of zone 1 in Greater Chennai Corporation. It is under Thiruvottiyur taluk in Chennai district. It is a part of Thiruvottiyur(state assembly constituency) and Chennai North (Lok Sabha constituency). Formerly a town and a municipality of Thiruvallur district in the Indian state of Tamil Nadu, it has now been absorbed by Chennai city in September 2011 and within Chennai District limit since January 2018. The neighbourhood is served by Katthivakkam railway station. As of 2011, the town had a population of 36,617.

== Demographics ==
Religious census
Religion	Percent(%)
Hindus	82.04%
Muslims	8.86%
Christians	8.53%
Sikhs	0.06%
Buddhists	0.01%
Jains	0.02%
Other	0.46%
No religion	0.02%

According to 2011 census, Kattivakkam had a population of 36,617 with a sex-ratio of 983 females for every 1,000 males, much above the national average of 929. A total of 4,301 were under the age of six, constituting 2,194 males and 2,107 females. Scheduled Castes and Scheduled Tribes accounted for 15.62% and .37% of the population respectively. The average literacy of the town was 74.5%, compared to the national average of 72.99%. The town had a total of : 9354 households. There were a total of 13,273 workers, comprising 17 cultivators, 49 main agricultural labourers, 201 in house hold industries, 10,613 other workers, 2,393 marginal workers, 4 marginal cultivators, 20 marginal agricultural labourers, 80 marginal workers in household industries and 2,289 other marginal workers. As per the religious census of 2011, Kattivakkam had 82.04% Hindus, 8.86% Muslims, 8.53% Christians, 0.06% Sikhs, 0.01% Buddhists, 0.02% Jains, 0.46% following other religions and 0.02% following no religion or did not indicate any religious preference.

== Education ==
E.T.P.S. Matriculation School is managed by "Ennore Thermal Power Station" under State government.
