= St. Thomas Mount National Shrine Basilica =

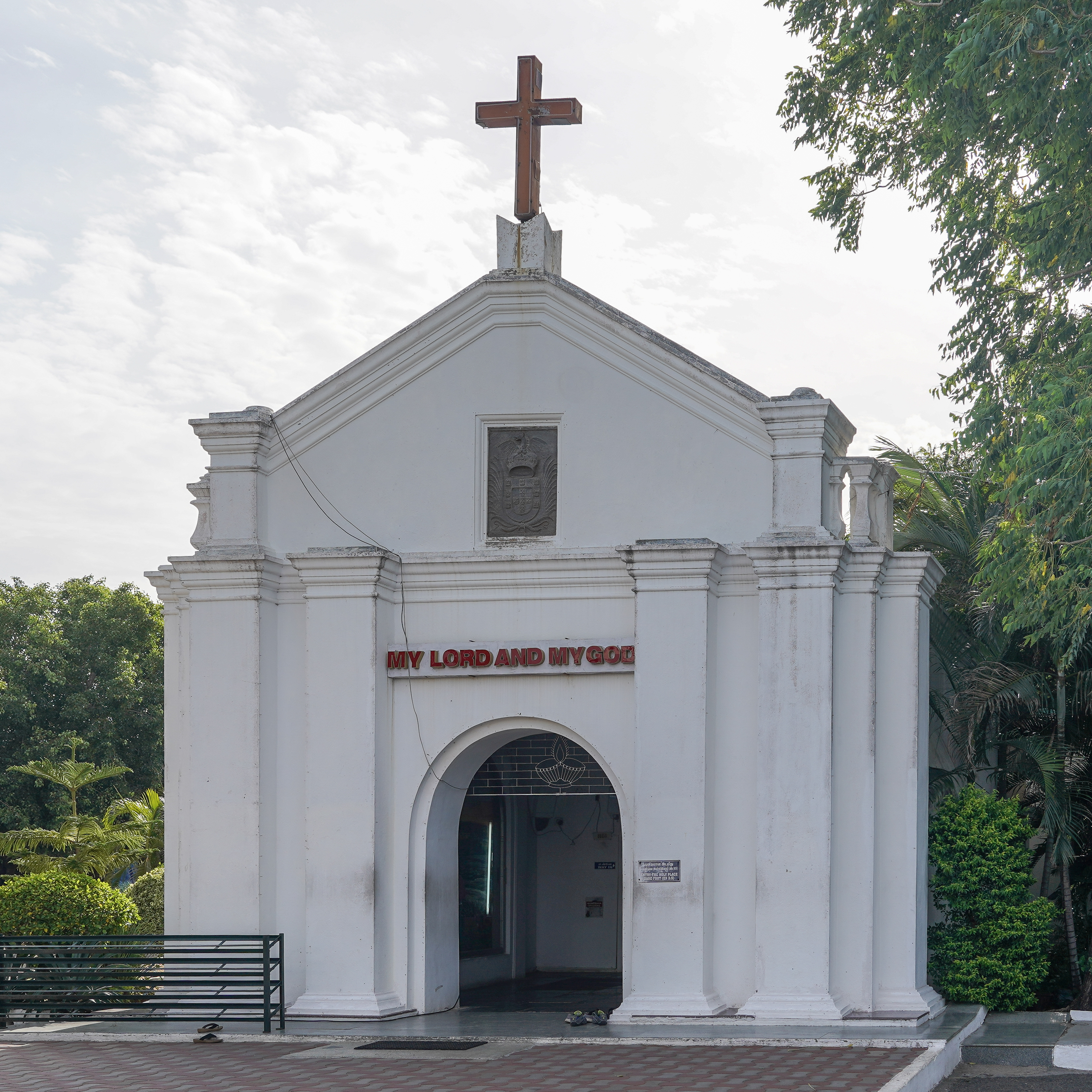
- Main entrance to the church
- St. Thomas Mount National Shrine Basilica
- 13.005127°N 80.1932298°E
- Country: India
- Denomination: Catholic
- Website: stthomasmountbasilica.com

History
- Founded: 1523

St. Thomas Mount National Shrine Basilica is a national shrine located in Parangimalai in Tamil Nadu.

The ancient Syrian Christian community of India traces the origin of their church to St. Thomas the Apostle.

In 1523, the Portuguese missionary Diego Fernandes built a small oratory on the Mount, reportedly over the foundations of an earlier church. As the number of pilgrims grew, Gaspar Coelho, the Vicar of the Church of Mylapore, laid the foundation for a larger church in 1547 and dedicated it to Our Lady of the Mount. The church is believed to have served as a lighthouse for Portuguese and Armenian ships during the 16th century.

The altar of this shrine was built on the spot where St. Thomas' death is traditionally believed to have occurred. At the northern foot of the mount is a gateway of four impressive arches surmounted by a cross bearing the inscribed date 1547. A flight of 160 steps leads up to the summit of the mount. The steps leading up the hill were donated by the famous Armenian Coja Petrus Uscan. There are 14 Stations of the Cross on the way to the summit.

The 500th anniversary of the church was celebrated in November 2023. Pope John Paul II visited the place on February 5, 1986. The shrine was elevated to the status of a minor basilica on 3 July 2025. The church is home to the Bleeding Cross of St. Thomas - a relic venerated as having been carved by the Apostle himself. Tradition holds that this Cross miraculously oozed blood on December 18th, the date commemorated as the martyrdom of St. Thomas, for 150 consecutive years.

There are other chapels on the Mount, including:

- Chapel of Our Lady of Expectations, patroness of the shrine.
- Chapel of St. Thomas, now called the Sanctuary of the Apostle.
- Eucharistic Chapel

== Gallery ==
=== Exterior of the church ===
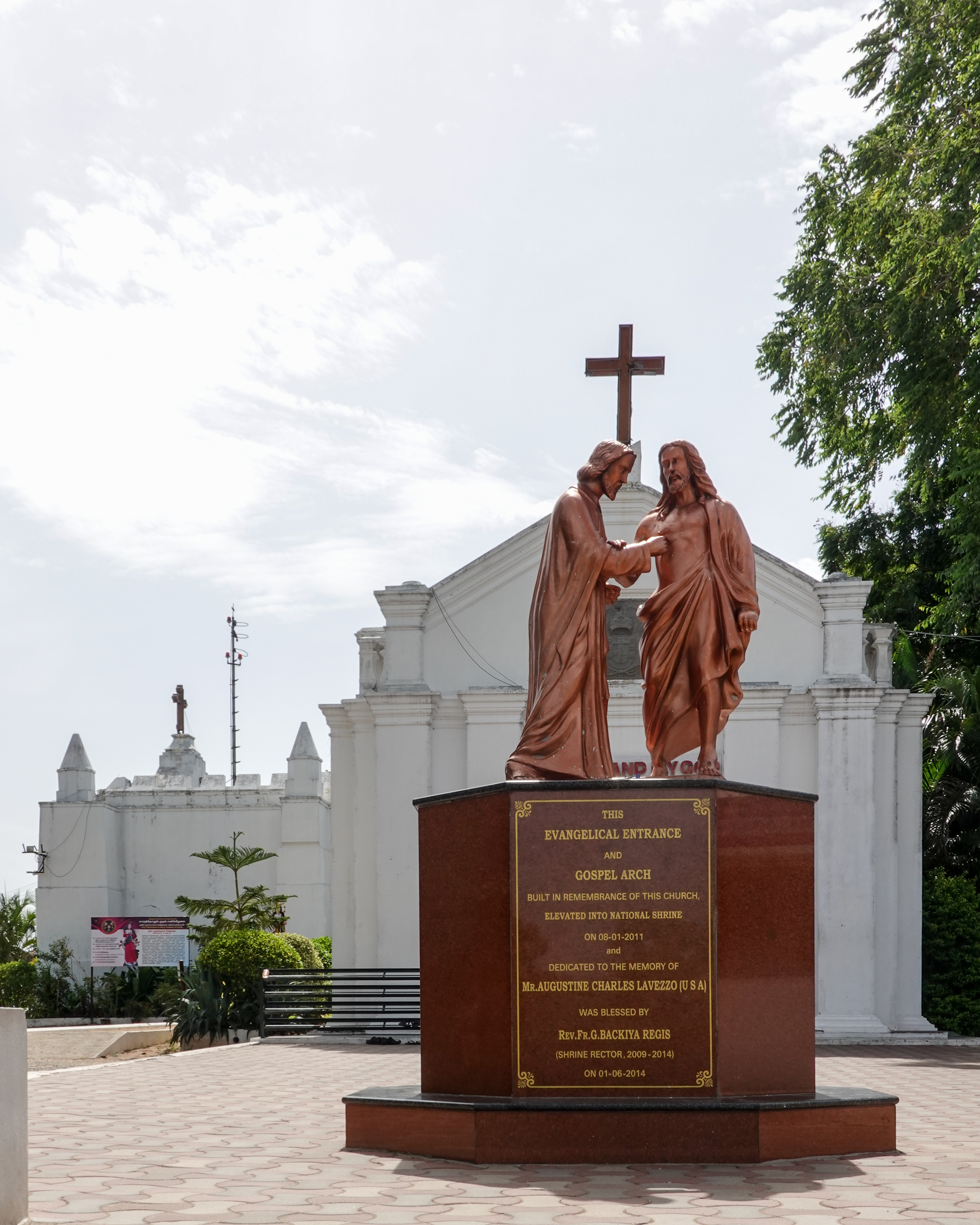
Entrance to the shrine

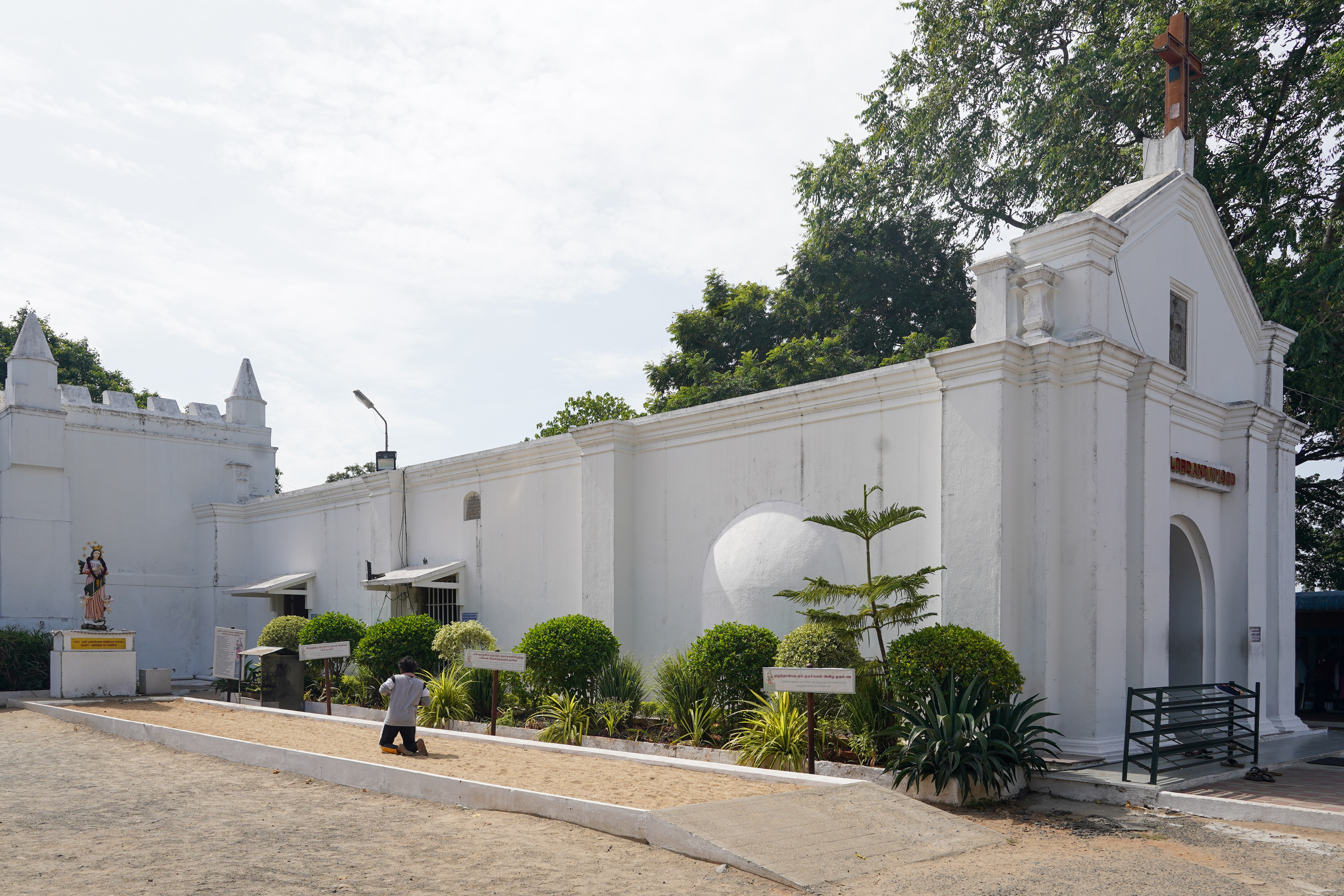
St. Thomas Church on the Mount

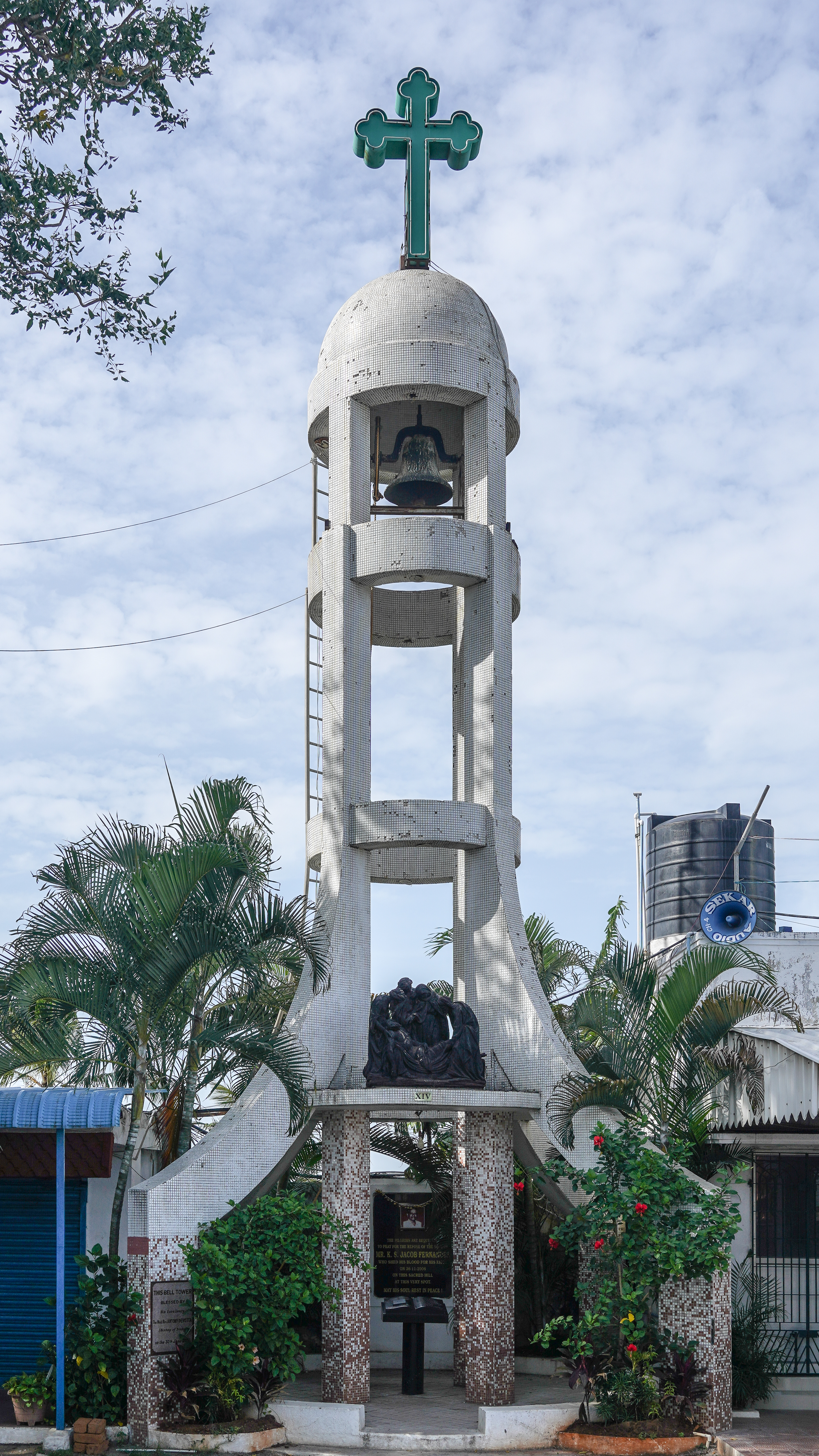
Bell tower

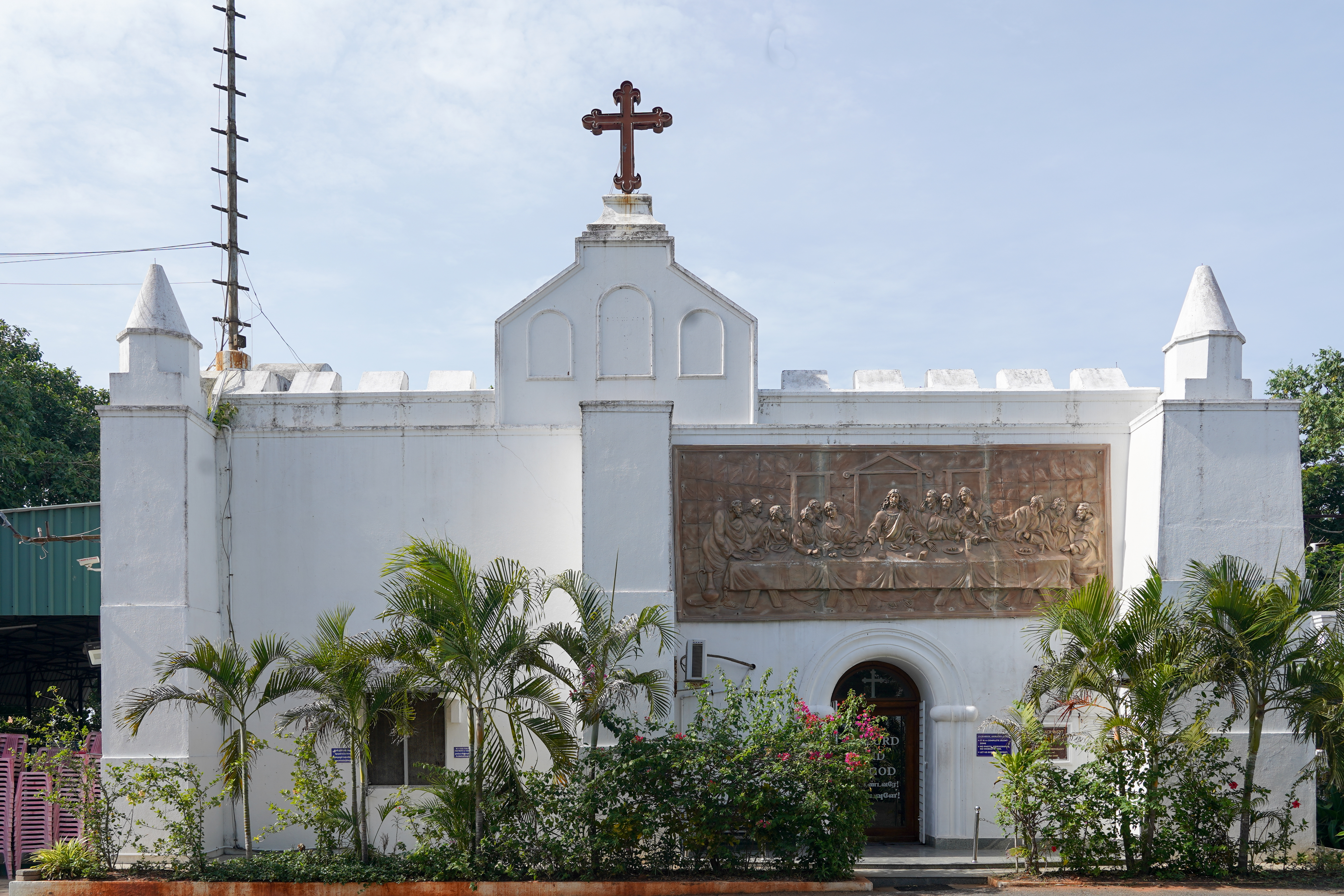
Blessed Sacrament Adoration Chapel

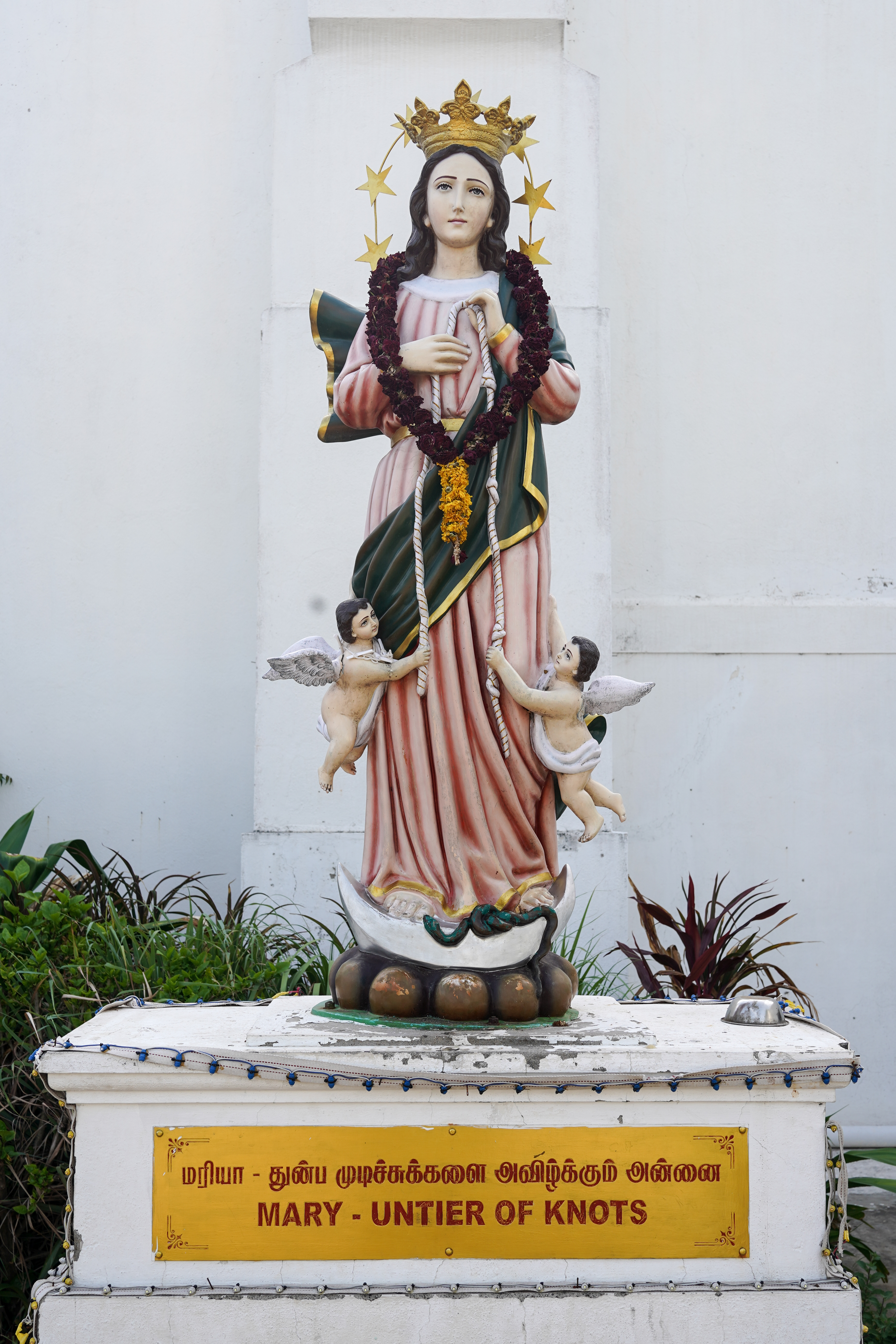
Mary Untier of Knots

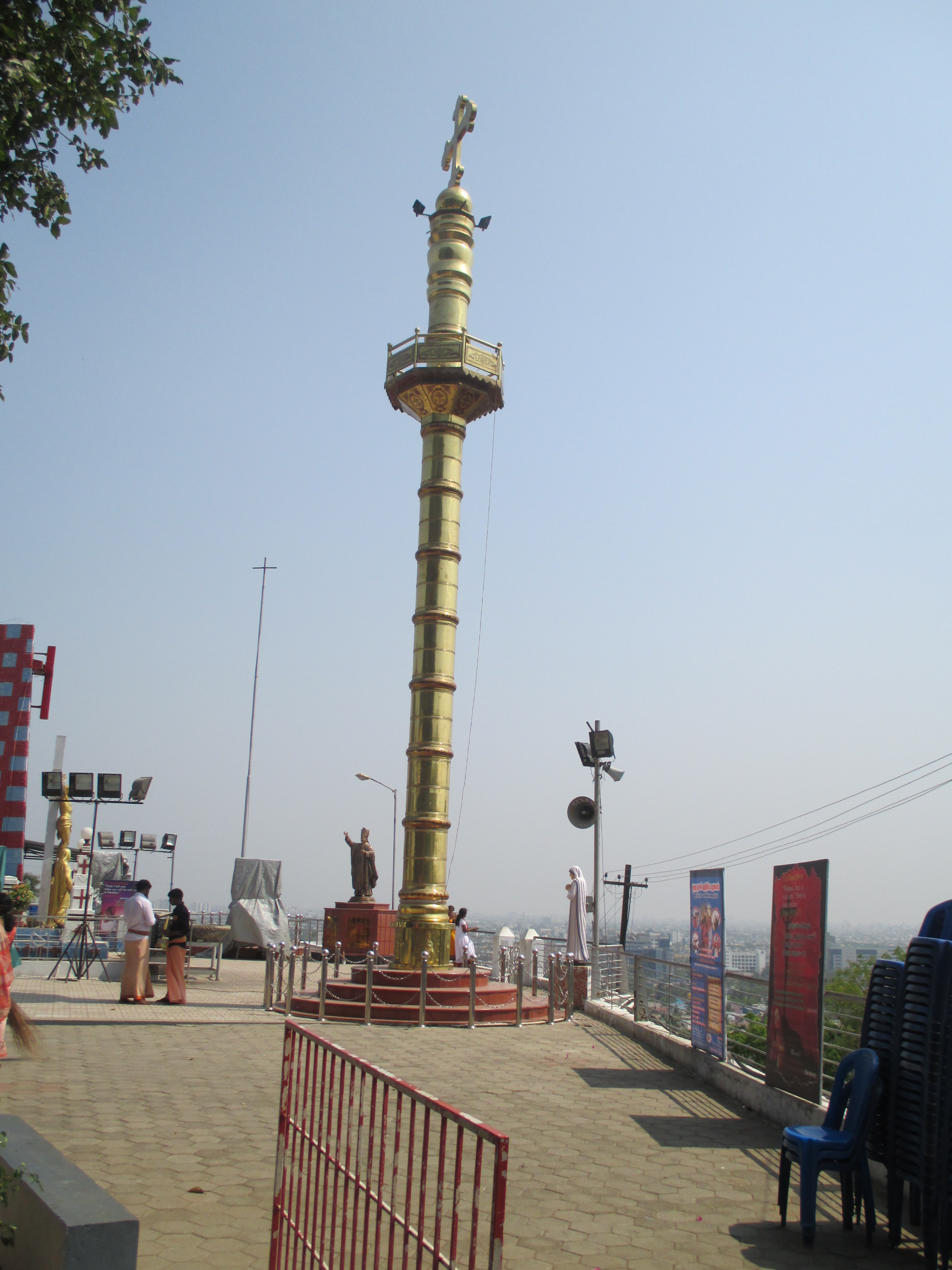
Flagstaff

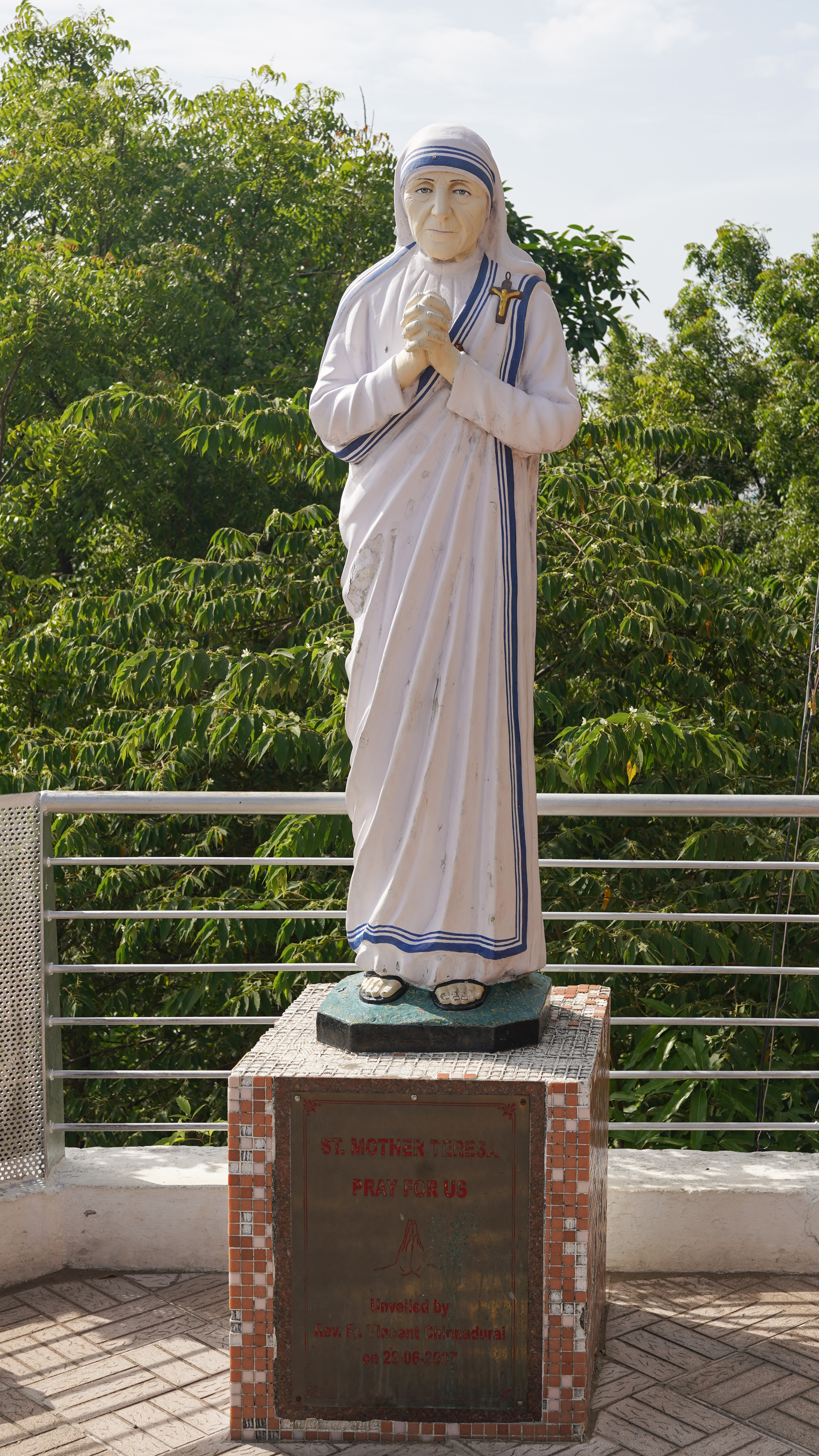
Mother Teresa

=== Interior of the church ===
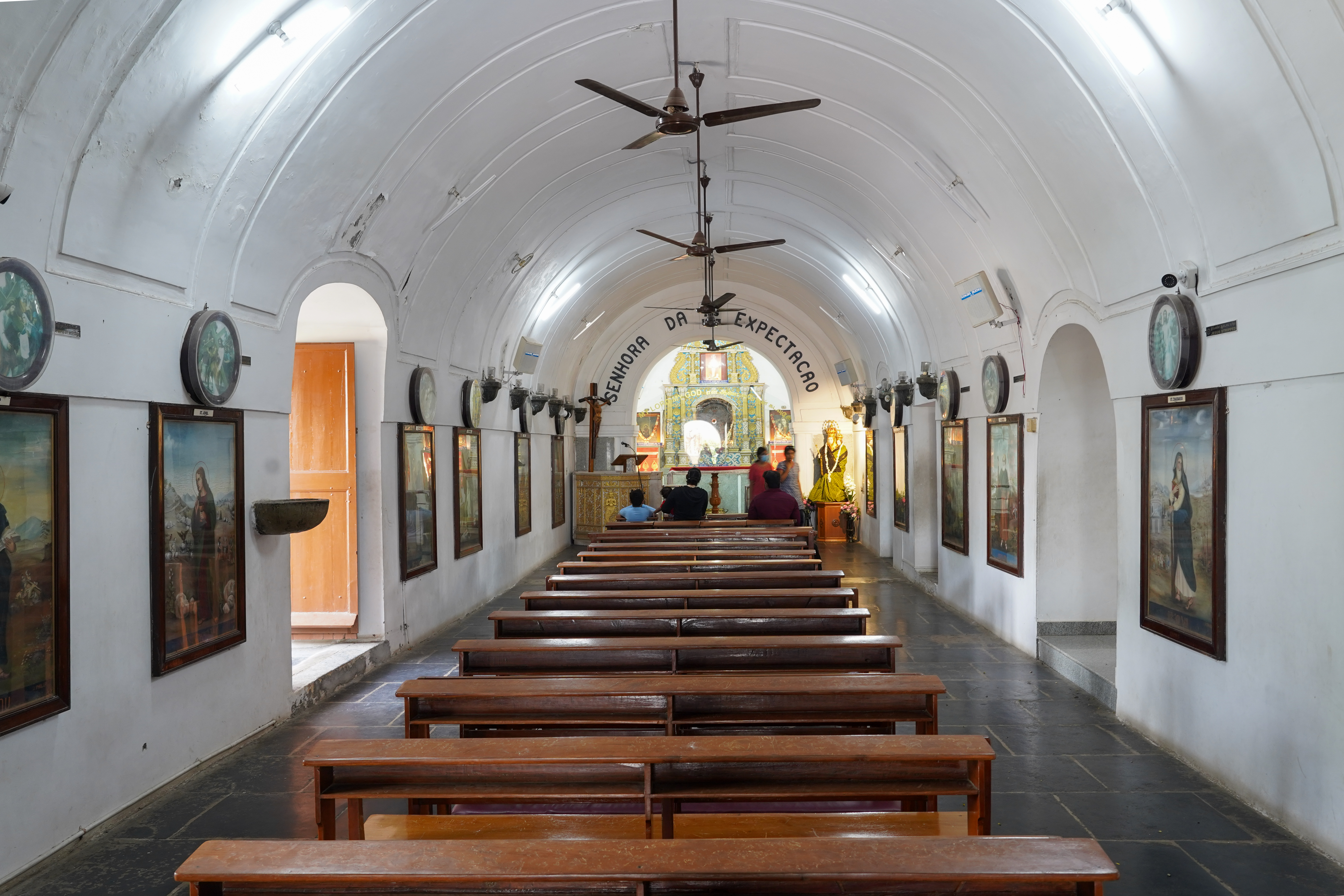
Nave

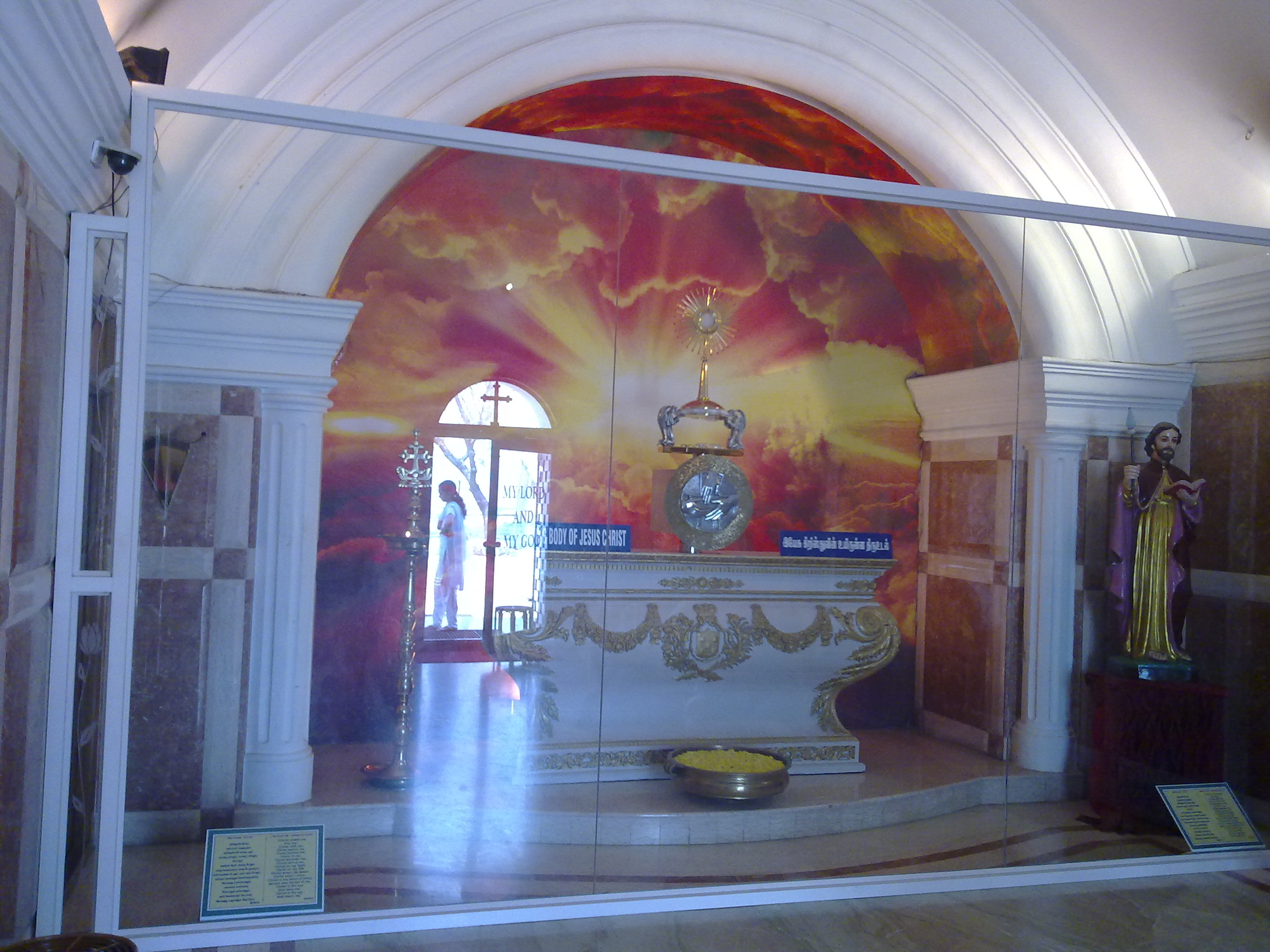
Altar

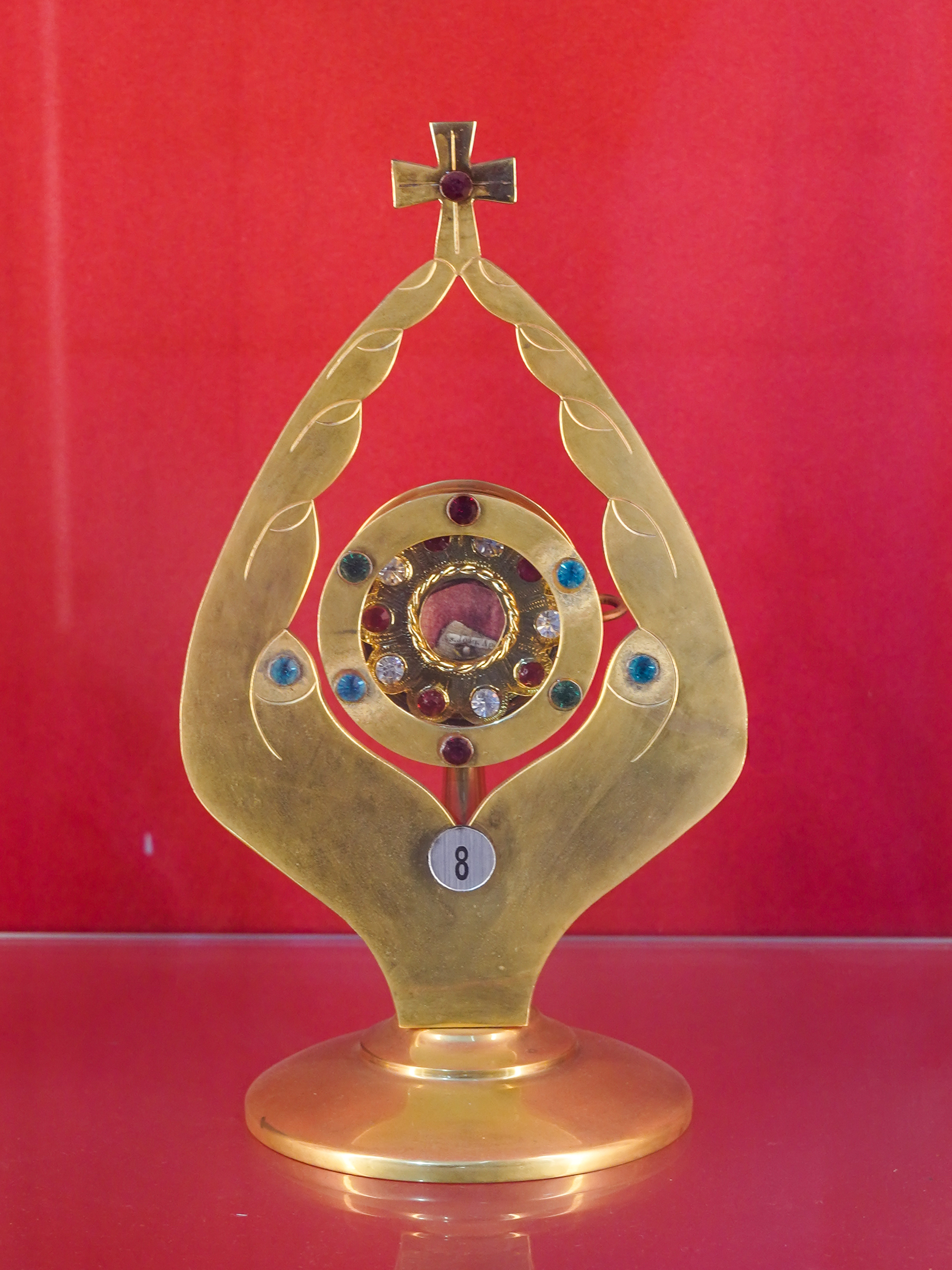
Relic of an apostle

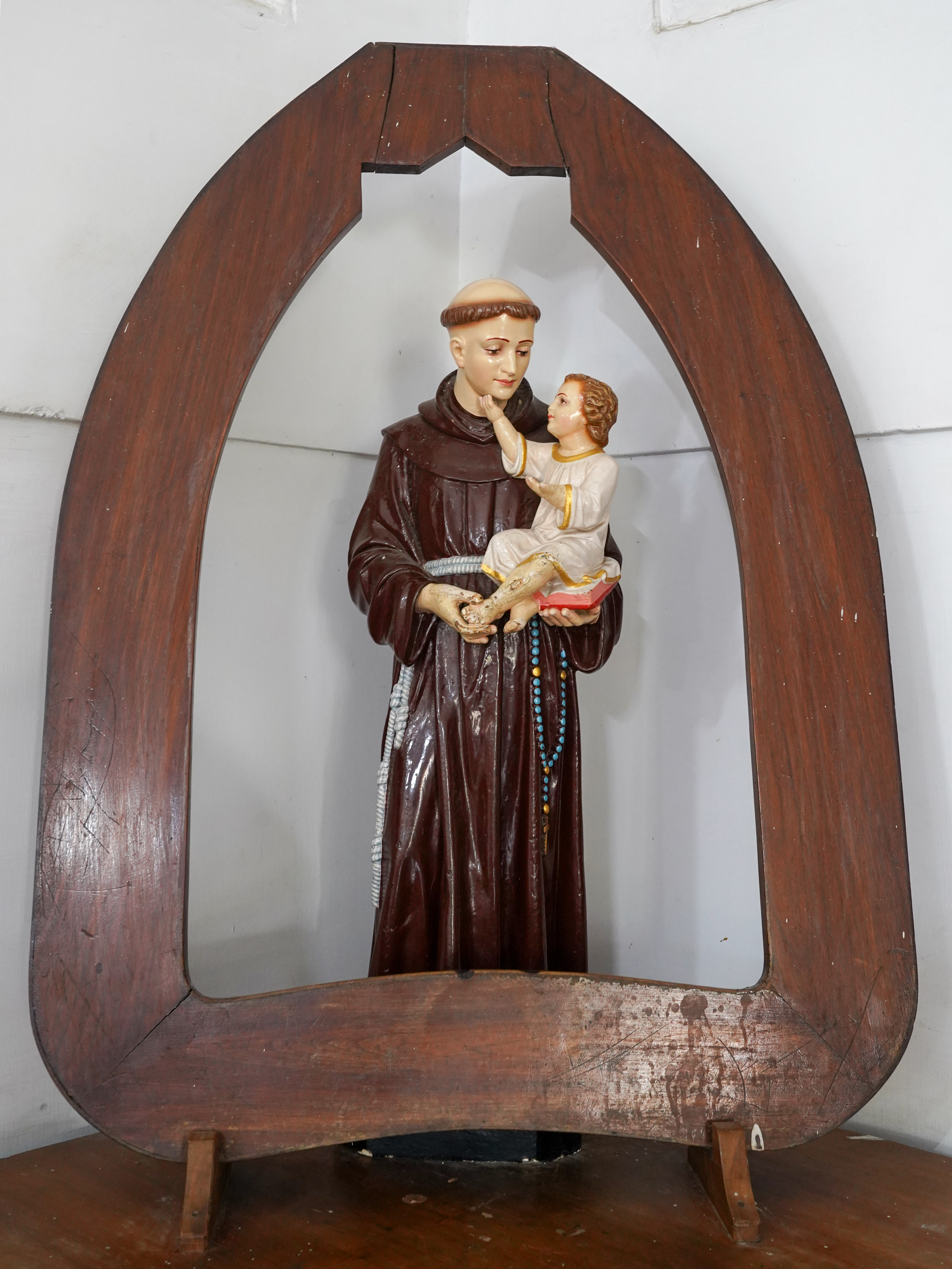
Saint Anthony and infant Jesus

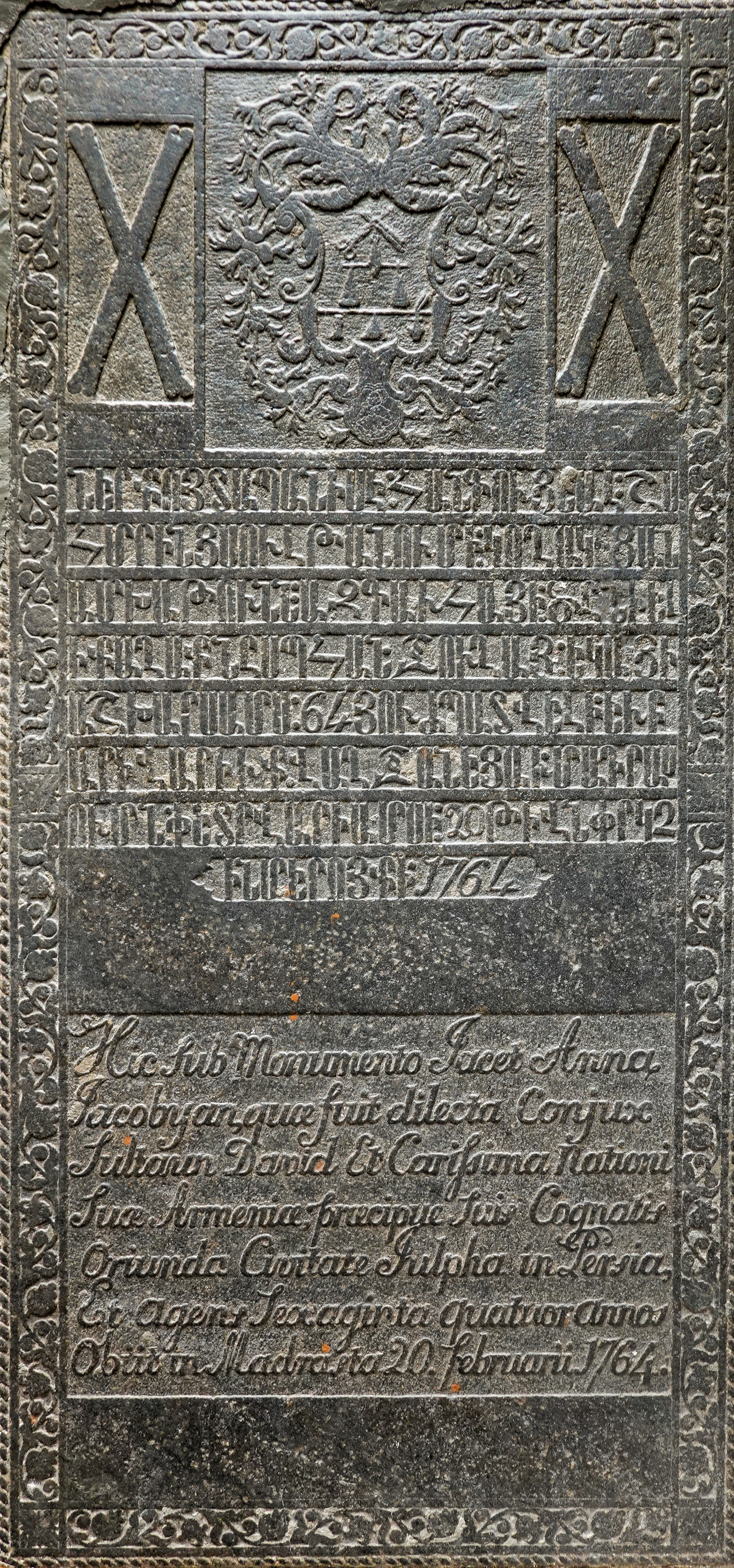
Gravestone in the entrance

=== Stations of the Cross ===
The 14 Stations of the Cross are positioned along the 160-step climb up the Mount.

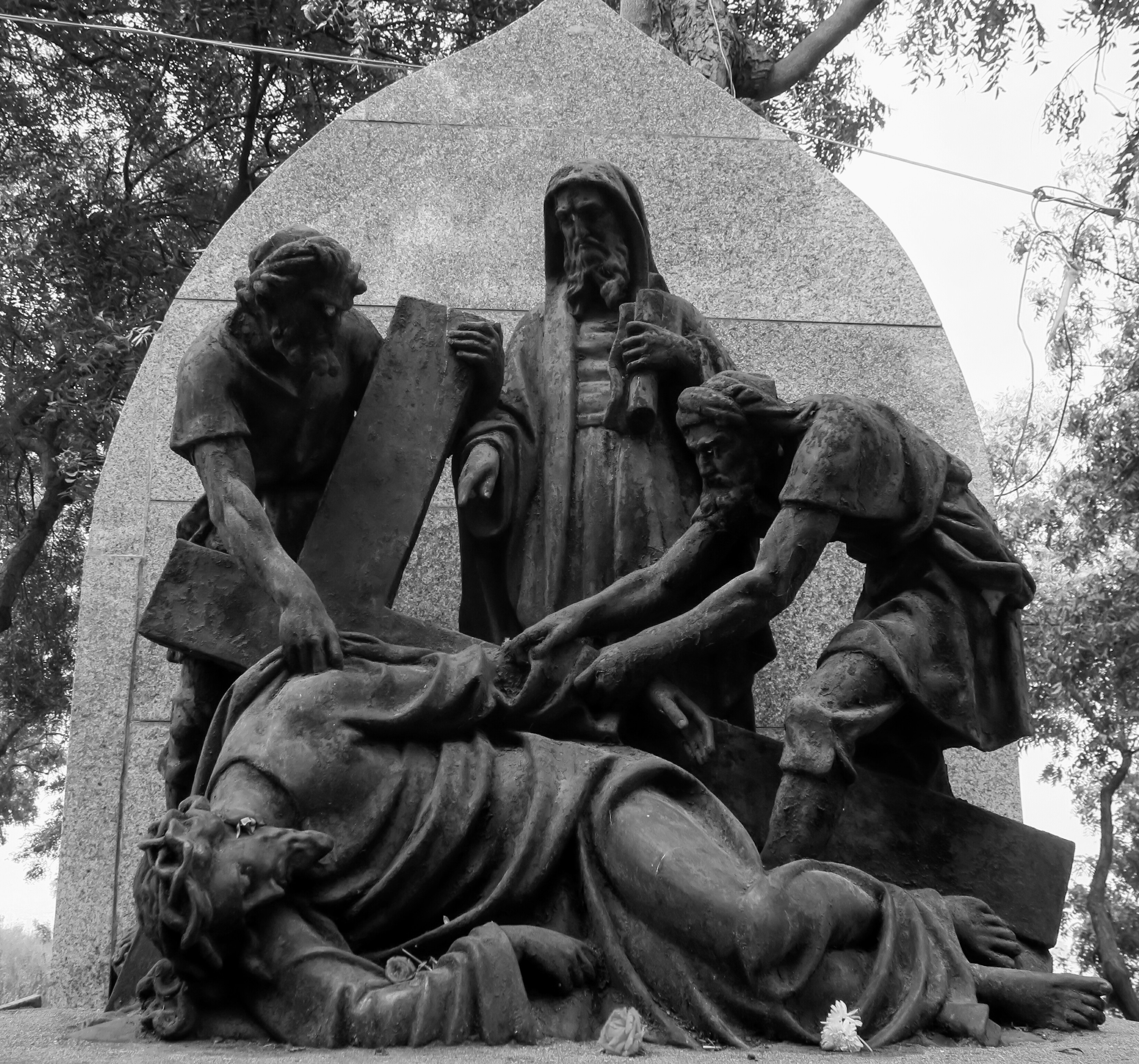
3: Jesus falls for the first time.

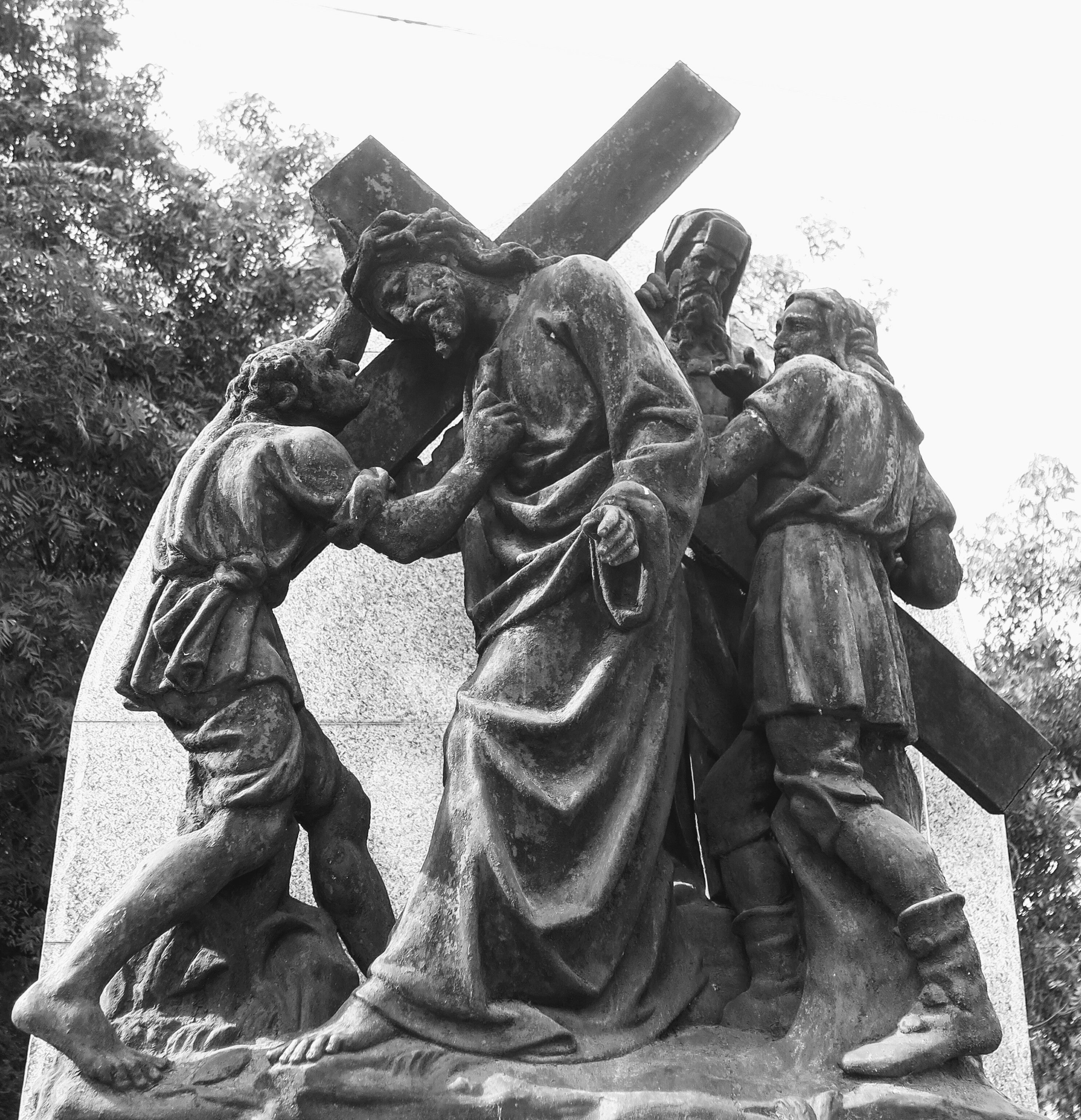
5: Simon helps carry the cross.

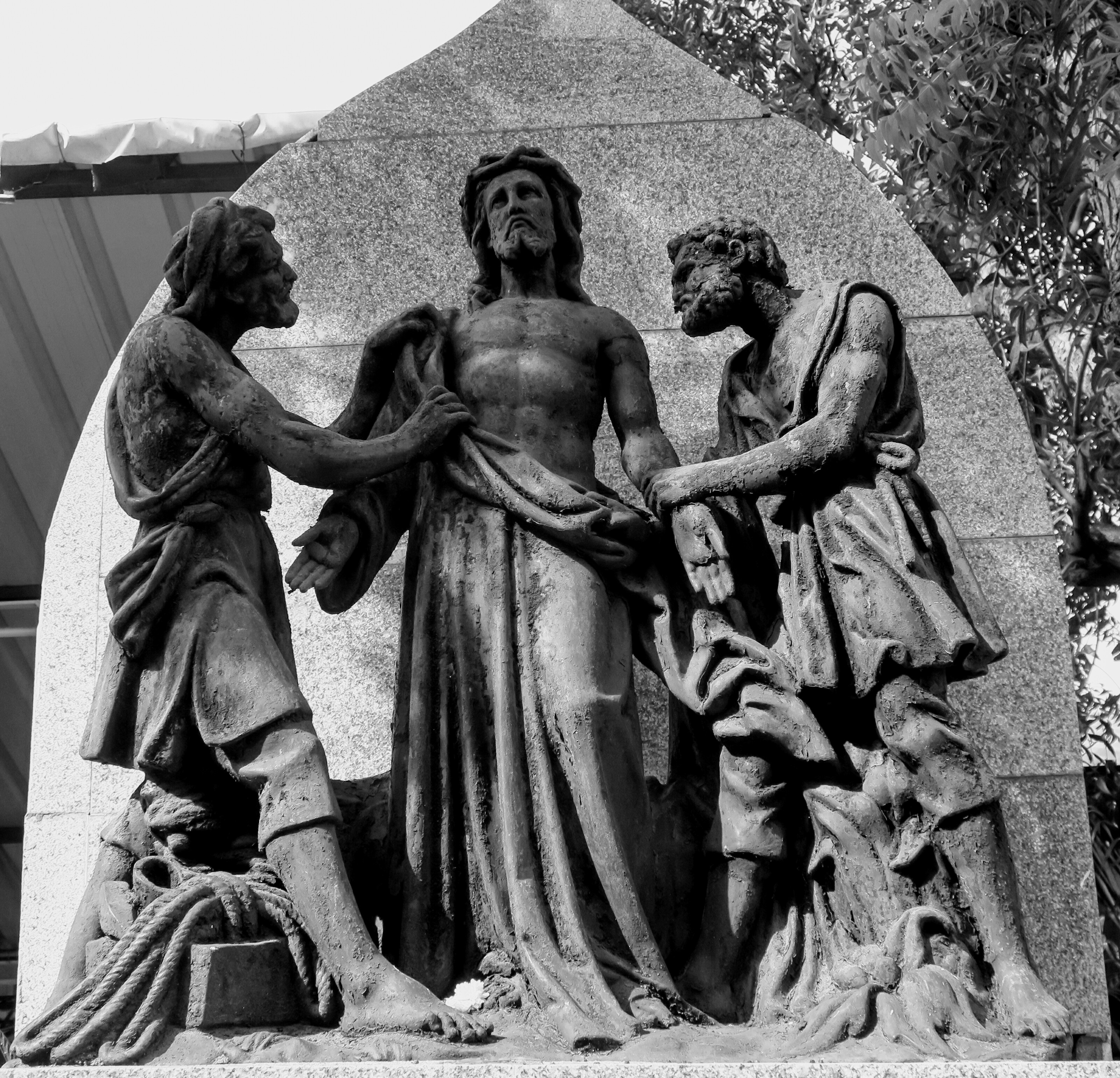
10: Jesus is stripped of his garments.

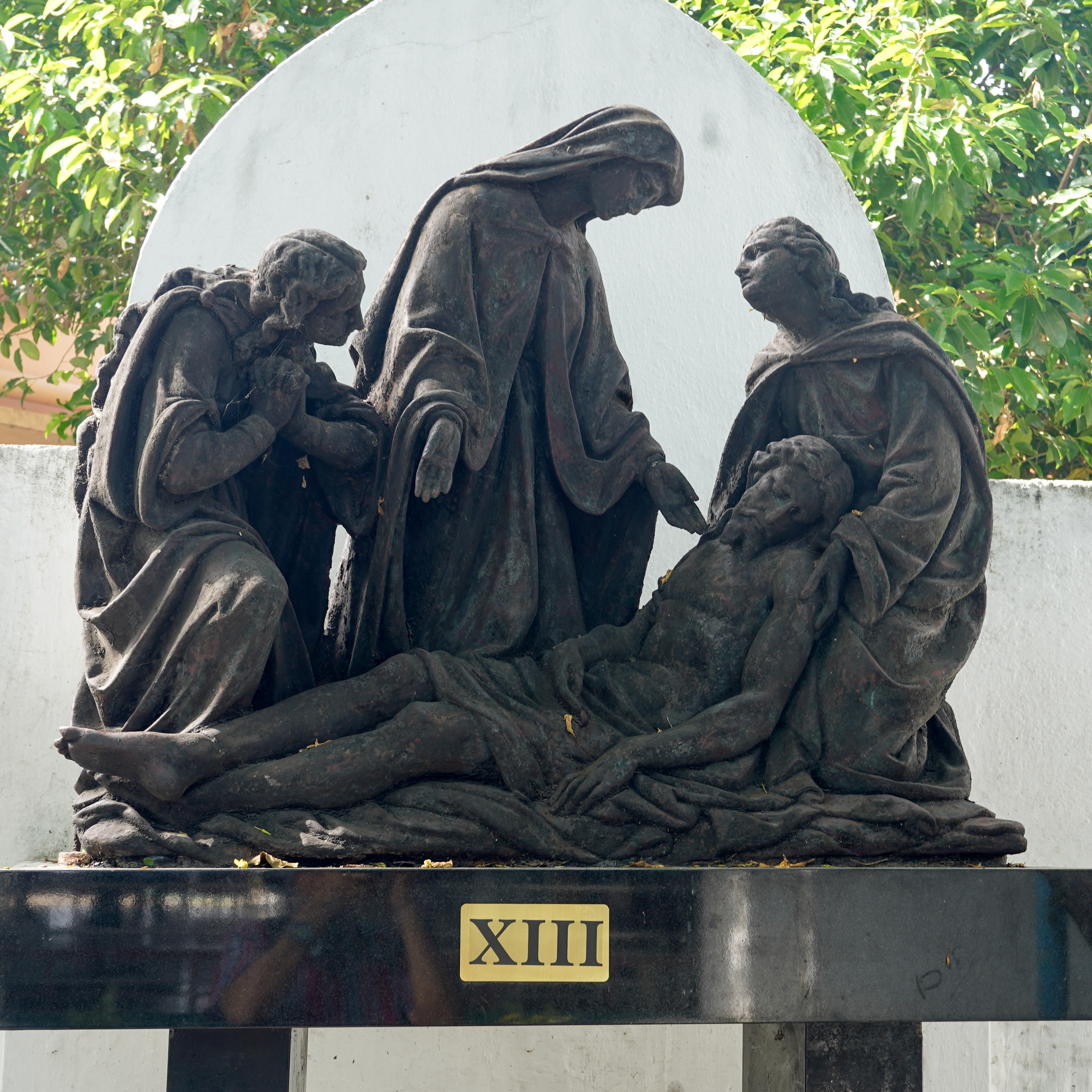
13: Jesus is taken down from the cross.

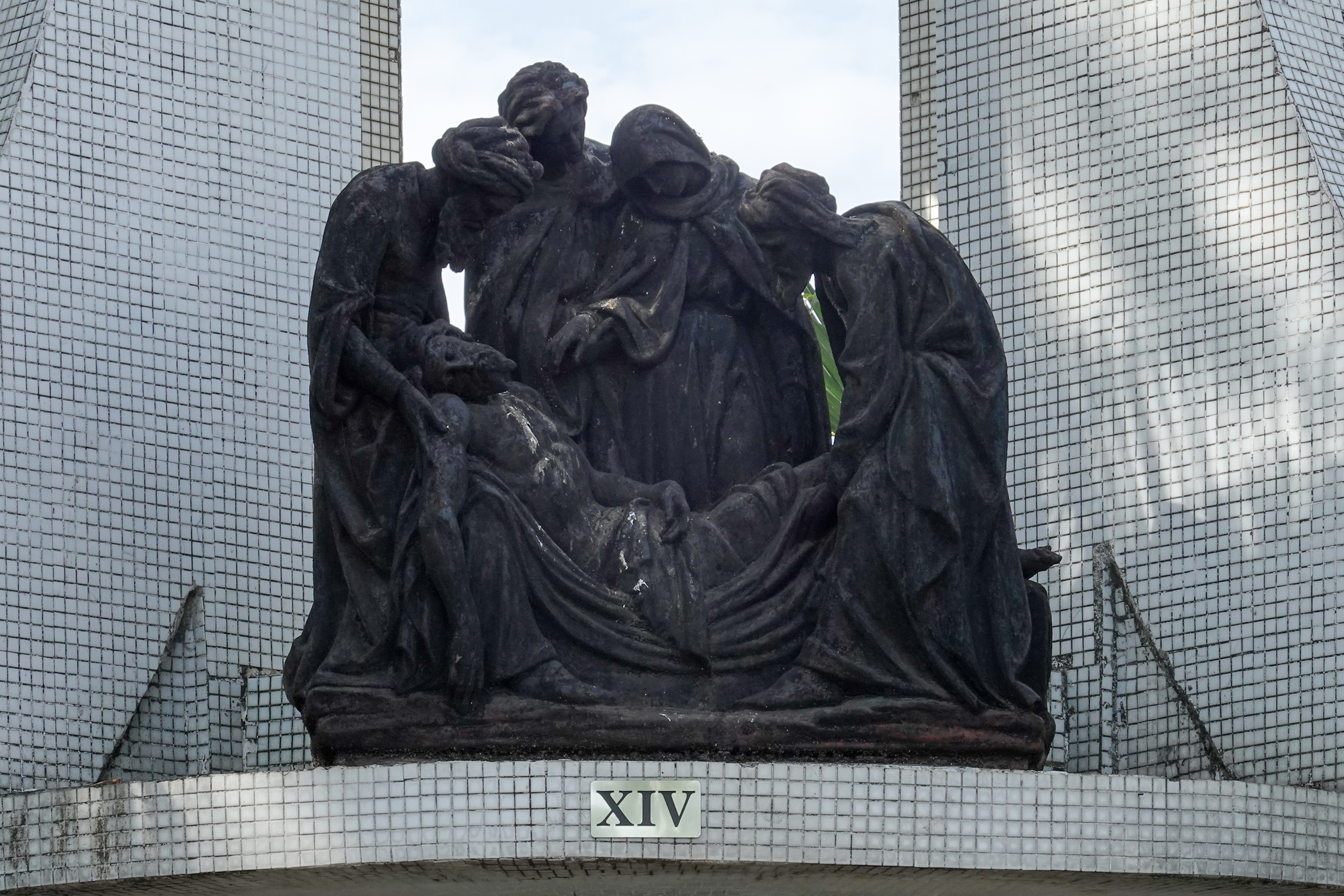
14: Jesus is laid in the tomb.
