= Nesapakkam =

- Neighbourhood
- Nesapakkam(Chennai) Nesapakkam (Tamil Nadu) Nesapakkam (India)
- Coordinates: 13.04005°N 80.19928°E
- Country: India
- State: Tamil Nadu
- District: Chennai District
- Metro: Chennai

Government
  - Body: Chennai Corporation

Languages
  - Official: Tamil
- Time zone: UTC+5:30 (IST)
- PIN: 600 078
- Vehicle registration: TN 09 (RTO, Chennai West)
- Vidhan Sabha constituency: Virugambakkam
- Planning agency: CMDA
- Civic agency: Chennai Corporation
- Website: www.chennai.tn.nic.in

Nesapakkam is a locality in the K.K.Nagar which is part of the city of Chennai, India. It is situated between Virugambakkam and Ramapuram.

Nesapakkam has an old sewage treatment plant. In 2025 it was announced that it was included in Metrowater's plan to rethink the system including an improved water supply to Chennai.
