= Jafferkhanpet =

Zaffarkhanpettai
- neighbourhood
- Location within Chennai Location within Tamil Nadu Location within India
- Coordinates: 13.0235°N 80.2237°E
- Country: India
- State: Tamil Nadu
- District: Chennai District
- Metro: Chennai
- Zone: Kodambakkam
- Ward: 138
- Taluk: Mambalam

Government
  - Body: Chennai Corporation

Languages
  - Official: Tamil
- Time zone: UTC+5:30 (IST)
- PIN: 600083
- Vehicle registration: TN-09
- Lok Sabha constituency: South chennai
- Vidhan Sabha constituency: Saidapet
- Planning agency: CMDA
- Civic agency: Chennai Corporation
- Website: www.chennai.tn.nic.in

Jafferkhanpet is a locality of Chennai, India. The PIN code of the locality is 600083.

It is adjacent to MGR canal and under the Greater Chennai Corporation. It is a low lying area which faces flooding during heavy rains. The 17.3 km MGR canal is a natural storm water drain that passes through West Jafferkhanpet and drains into Adayar river.
