= Medavakkam =

- neighbourhood
- Location within Chennai
- Coordinates: 12.917158°N 80.19287°E
- Country: India
- State: Tamil Nadu
- City: Tambaram

Population
  - Total: Approximately 22,000

Languages
- Time zone: UTC+5:30 (IST)
- PIN: 600100
- Telephone code: 044-22770733
- Vehicle registration: TN-14
- Lok Sabha constituency: South Chennai
- Vidhan Sabha constituency: Sholinganallur

Medavakkam is a southern suburb of Chennai in Tambaram City of Chengalpattu district, which is adjacent to the neighbourhoods of Sholinganallur, Madipakkam, Selaiyur, Keelkattalai, Velachery and Tambaram and it is center place to the developing suburbs like Ponmar, Ottiyambakkam and Sithalapakkam. Medavakkam is administered by Village Panchayat, which comes under the Shollinganallur MLA Constituency and South Chennai MP Constituency. Medavakkam will be part of Tambaram City Municipal Corporation. This location is a fast developing residential locality due to its close proximity to the IT corridor OMR (approx 4 km from Sholinganallur) and SEZ in Medavakkam Sholinganallur Road.

According to a 2012 report by global property consultant Knight Frank, the neighbourhood has emerged as India's 6th largest destination for investment in the residential real estate, in the list of 13-top residential destinations in the country from an investment point of view, where housing prices are expected to increase by 103 percent over the period 2012–2017.
