= Angadu =

Village in Tamil Nadu, India

Coordinates: 13°13′37″N 80°11′15″E

Angadu is a village located in the Indian state of Tamil Nadu.
