= Aranvoyal =

Village in Tiruvallur, Tamil Nadu, India

Aranvoyal is a village located in the Indian state of Tamil Nadu.
