= Echankuzhi =

Echankuzhi ஈச்சன்குழி
- Neighbourhood
- Location within Chennai Location within Tamil Nadu Location within India
- Coordinates: 13.21051°N 80.27122°E
- Country: India
- State: Tamil Nadu
- District: Chennai
- Taluk: Tiruvottiyur
- Metro: Chennai
- Zone & Ward: Manali Zone 2 & Ward 15

Languages
  - Official: Tamil
- Time zone: UTC+5:30 (IST)
- PIN: 600103
- Telephone code: 044-2593
- Vehicle registration: TN-18-xxxx & TN-20-xxxx(old)
- Civic agency: Greater Chennai Corporation
- Planning agency: CMDA
- City: Chennai
- Lok Sabha constituency: Chennai North
- Vidhan Sabha constituency: Tiruvottiyur
- Website: http://www.chennaicorporation.gov.in/

Echankuzhi (Tamil: ஈச்சன்குழி), is an residential area in Manali Pudhunagar, North of Chennai, a metropolitan city in Tamil Nadu, India. In October 2011, the erstwhile Edayanchavadi village panchayat is merged with Greater Chennai Corporation and it came under the jurisdiction of Greater Chennai Corporation. Though Echankuzhi is annexed with Greater Chennai Corporation it is remained as a part of Tiruvottiyur taluk in Tiruvallur district till 15 August 2018.

== Location ==
Echankuzhi is located in Manali, North Chennai with Tiruvottiyur in the east and south. Other neighbouring areas include Mathur, Madhavaram, Andarkuppam, Manali Pudhunagar, Kosappur, Ennore.
