= Elanthanoor =

Elanthanoor எலந்தனூர் Elanthanur
- Neighbourhood
- Location within Chennai Location within Tamil Nadu Location within India
- Coordinates: 13.18904°N 80.26944°E
- Country: India
- State: Tamil Nadu
- District: Chennai
- Taluk: Tiruvottiyur
- Metro: Chennai
- Zone & Ward: Manali Zone 2 & Ward 16

Languages
  - Official: Tamil
- Time zone: UTC+5:30 (IST)
- PIN: 600103
- Telephone code: 044-2593
- Vehicle registration: TN-18-xxxx & TN-20-xxxx(old)
- Civic agency: Greater Chennai Corporation
- Planning agency: CMDA
- City: Chennai
- Lok Sabha constituency: Chennai North
- Vidhan Sabha constituency: Tiruvottiyur
- Website: http://www.chennaicorporation.gov.in/

Elanthanoor (Tamil: எலந்தனூர்), is an industrial/residential area in Manali, North of Chennai, a metropolitan city in Tamil Nadu, India. In October 2011, the erstwhile Sadayankuppam village panchayat is merged with Greater Chennai Corporation and it came under the jurisdiction of Greater Chennai Corporation. Though Elanthanoor is annexed with Greater Chennai Corporation it is remained as a part of Tiruvottiyur taluk in Tiruvallur district till 15 August 2018.

== Location ==
Elanthanoor is located in Manali, North Chennai with Tiruvottiyur in the east and south. Other neighbouring areas include Mathur, Madhavaram, Andarkuppam, Manali Pudhunagar, Kosappur, Ennore.
