= Chettimedu, Chennai =

Chettimedu செட்டிமேடு
- Neighbourhood
- Location within Chennai Location within Tamil Nadu Location within India
- Coordinates: 13.18540°N 80.22489°E
- Country: India
- State: Tamil Nadu
- District: Chennai
- Taluk: Madhavaram
- Metro: Chennai
- Zone & Ward: Manali Zone 2 & Ward 17

Languages
  - Official: Tamil
- Time zone: UTC+5:30 (IST)
- PIN: 600060
- Vehicle registration: TN-18-xxxx & TN-20-xxxx(old)
- Civic agency: Greater Chennai Corporation
- Planning agency: CMDA
- City: Chennai
- Lok Sabha constituency: Tiruvallur
- Vidhan Sabha constituency: Madhavaram
- Website: http://www.chennaicorporation.gov.in/

Chettimedu (Tamil: செட்டிமேடு), is an industrial/residential area located north of Chennai, a metropolitan city in Tamil Nadu, India. Chettimedu was a part of the erstwhile Vadaperumbakkam village panchayat where it is merged with Greater Chennai Corporation and it came under the jurisdiction of Greater Chennai Corporation since October 2011. Though Chettimedu is annexed with Greater Chennai Corporation it is remained as a part of Madhavaram taluk in Tiruvallur district till 15 August 2018.

== Location ==
Chettimedu is located north of Chennai with Kosappur in the east and Vadaperumbakkam in the south. Other neighbouring areas include Mathur, Madhavaram, Theeyambakkam and Manali.
