= Ariyalur, Chennai =

Ariyalur அரியலூர்
- Neighbourhood
- Location within Chennai Location within Tamil Nadu Location within India
- Coordinates: 13.19072°N 80.25094°E
- Country: India
- State: Tamil Nadu
- District: Chennai
- Taluk: Tiruvottiyur
- Metro: Chennai
- Zone & Ward: Manali Zone 2 & Ward 17
- Elevation: 25 m (82 ft)

Languages
  - Official: Tamil
- Time zone: UTC+5:30 (IST)
- PIN: 600103
- Telephone code: 044-2594
- Vehicle registration: TN-18-xxxx & TN-20-xxxx(old)
- Civic agency: Corporation of Chennai
- Planning agency: CMDA
- City: Chennai
- Lok Sabha constituency: Chennai North
- Vidhan Sabha constituency: Tiruvottiyur
- Website: http://www.chennaicorporation.gov.in/

Ariyalur (Tamil: அரியலூர்), is a district in Manali New Town, North Chennai, a metropolitan city in Tamil Nadu, India.

== Location ==
The arterial roads to Ariyalur are the Anna Salai (Andarkuppam-Redhills Road), Vaikkadu-Ammulaivoyal Road, Madhavaram Milk Colony Road and the Kamarajar Salai. This part of Chennai was considered to be rural even its location within Greater Chennai Corporation limits. With the Inner Ring Road becoming functional the area was easily accessible from the Chennai Mofussil Bus Terminus, now renamed as Puratchi Thalaivi Dr. M.G.R. Bus Terminus.

The district is home to the Brihadisvara Temple in Gangaikonda Cholapuram.
