= Amullaivoyal =

Amullaivoyal ஆமுல்லைவாயல்
- Neighbourhood
- Location within Chennai Location within Tamil Nadu Location within India
- Coordinates: 13.18200°N 80.25239°E
- Country: India
- State: Tamil Nadu
- District: Chennai
- Taluk: Tiruvottiyur
- Metro: Chennai
- Zone & Ward: Manali Zone 2 & Ward 18
- Elevation: 18 m (59 ft)

Languages
  - Official: Tamil
- Time zone: UTC+5:30 (IST)
- PIN: 600103
- Telephone code: 044-2594
- Vehicle registration: TN-18-xxxx & TN-20-xxxx(old)
- Civic agency: Corporation of Chennai
- Planning agency: CMDA
- City: Chennai
- Lok Sabha constituency: Chennai North
- Vidhan Sabha constituency: Tiruvottiyur
- Website: http://www.chennaicorporation.gov.in/

Amullaivoyal (Tamil: ஆமுல்லைவாயல்), is a rural industrial area in North Chennai, a metropolitan city in Tamil Nadu, India and a part in Manali industrial area. Though it is located within Greater Chennai Corporation limits it is lack behind the development of the neighbourhood. The arterial roads to Amullaivoyal are the Ammullaivoyal - Vaikkadu Road, Anna Salai (Andarkuppam - Red Hills Road) and the Neduchezhian street. The Inner Ring Road becoming functional the area was easily accessible from the Chennai Mofussil Bus Terminus. Also, with MTC operating more buses from Manali. Tiruvottiyur railway station is the nearest Railway Station of Amullaivoyal, which is 6 km away from Amullaivoyal.
