= List of taluks in Chennai district =

Taluks of Chennai district, Tamil Nadu, India

Taluks of Chennai district
- Category: Taluks
- Location: Chennai district
- Number: 17 taluks
- Government: Government of Tamil Nadu

The Chennai district in the state of Tamil Nadu, India, comprises three revenue divisions: Chennai Central, Chennai North, and Chennai South. As of August 2024, these divisions encompass the following 17 subdivisions or taluks.

== Chennai Central division ==
1. Ambattur
2. Aminjikarai
3. Ayanavaram
4. Egmore
5. Kolathur
6. Maduravoyal
7. Mambalam

== Chennai North division ==
1. Madhavaram
2. Perambur
3. Purasawalkam
4. Tiruvottiyur
5. Tondiarpet

== Chennai South division ==
1. Alandur
2. Guindy
3. Mylapore
4. Sholinganallur
5. Velachery
