= Kadapakkam, Chennai =

Kadapakkam கடப்பாக்கம்
- Neighbourhood
- Location within Chennai Location within Tamil Nadu Location within India
- Coordinates: 13.202596°N 80.248640°E
- Country: India
- State: Tamil Nadu
- Metro: Chennai
- Elevation: 3 m (9.8 ft)

Languages
  - Official: Tamil
- Time zone: UTC+5:30 (IST)
- PIN: 600103
- Telephone code: 044
- Vehicle registration: TN-20-xxxx & TN-18-xxxx(new)
- Planning agency: CMDA
- City: Chennai
- Lok Sabha constituency: North Chennai
- Vidhan Sabha constituency: Tiruvottiyur

Kadapakkam village (Tamil: கடப்பாக்கம்) is a developing residential area in North Chennai, a metropolitan city in Tamil Nadu, India.

== Location ==
Kadapakkam is located in North Chennai with Manali New Town, Edayanchavadi in the east and Mathur to the South. Other neighbouring areas include Manali, Madhavaram, Kodungaiyur.

The arterial roads to Kadapakkam are the Anna Salai (Andarkuppam-Redhills Road), Tiruvottiyur-Ponneri High Road. This part of Chennai was considered socially backward a decade ago. However, due to rapid increase in need for quality affordable residential areas in and around Chennai, Kadapakkam became a hunting ground for real estate agents. With the Inner Ring Road becoming functional the area was easily accessible from the Chennai Mofussil Bus Terminus.
