= Periyasekkadu =

- Neighbourhood
- Location in Tamil Nadu, India Periyasekkadu (Tamil Nadu) Periyasekkadu (India)
- Coordinates: 13.159976°N 80.252588°E
- Country: India
- State: Tamil Nadu
- District: Thiruvallur
- Metro: Chennai
- Zone: Madhavaram Zone No 3
- Ward: Periyasekkadu (Ward 28)
- Elevation: 11 m (36 ft)

Languages
  - Official: Tamil
- Time zone: UTC+5:30 (IST)
- PIN: 600051
- Telephone code: 044-2594
- Vehicle registration: TN-20-xxxx & TN-18-xxxx(new)
- Civic agency: Corporation of Chennai
- Planning agency: CMDA
- City: Chennai

Periyasekkadu (or Peryasekadu) is a neighbourhood of Chennai in Thiruvallur district in the state of Tamil Nadu, India. Periyasekkadu used to be a part of Madhavaram Municipality in Thiruvallur district. In 2011, Madhavaram Municipality was merged with Chennai Corporation. Peryasekadu comes under ward 28 in Zone 3 (Madhavaram) of Chennai Corporation. It forms part of the Madavaram Assembly segment within Tiruvallur constituency for elections to the Lok Sabha.
