= Tondiarpet division =

Tondiarpet division is a revenue division in the Chennai district of Tamil Nadu, India. It comprises the taluks of Madhavaram, Perambur, Purasaiwalkam, Tiruvottiyur and Tondiarpet.
