= Madhavaram Lake =

Lake in India

- Manali Aeri, Mathur Aeri, Madavaram Aeri
- Location within Chennai Location within Tamil Nadu Location within India
- Location: Manali-Mathur-Madavaram, Chennai, India
- Coordinates: 13°17′55″N 80°10′40″E
- Type: Lake
- Basin countries: India
- Surface area: 150 acres (61 ha)
- Settlements: Chennai

Madhavaram Lake also known as Manali Aeri, or Mathur Aeri or Madhavaram Aeri, is a 150-acre lake in the Manali-Mathur-Madavaram area of Chennai, India.

== Geography ==
Due to indiscriminate dumping of garbage and sewage, the lake has shrunk to less than 100 acres.

A recent study by Nature Trust, an NGO working on the flora and fauna recorded in the lake, showed that about 55 species of birds have been reported in the wetland. However, about 500 birds were regularly sighted till the mid-1990s.

The lake was cleaned by NSS volunteers of JHA Agarcen College in Madhavaram in December 2009.

== See also ==
- Water management in Chennai
