= Gounderpalayam =

Gounderpalayam கவுண்டர்பாளையம் G R Palayam
- Suburb
- Location within Chennai Location within Tamil Nadu Location within India
- Coordinates: 13.24255°N 80.27405°E
- Country: India
- State: Tamil Nadu
- District: Tiruvallur
- Taluk: Ponneri
- Metro: Chennai
- Elevation: 15 m (49 ft)

Languages
  - Official: Tamil
- Time zone: UTC+5:30 (IST)
- PIN: 600103
- Telephone code: 044-xxxx
- Vehicle registration: TN-18-xxxx & TN-20-xxxx(old)
- Planning agency: CMDA
- City: Chennai
- Lok Sabha constituency: Thiruvallur
- Vidhan Sabha constituency: Ponneri

Gounderpalayam (Tamil: கவுண்டர்பாளையம்), is a suburb in Tiruvallur, located North of Chennai, a metropolitan city in Tamil Nadu, India. A town with the same name also exists in Salem district with PIN 636113.

== Location ==
Gounderpalayam is located between Manali New Town and Minjur in North of Chennai. In 2016, the arterial road in Gounderpalayam on the Tiruvottiyur Ponneri Panchetty (TPP) High Road used to cause bad traffic jams as it gets battered during rainy season.
