= Theeyampakkam =

Theeyampakkam தீயம்பாக்கம்
- Neighbourhood
- Location within Chennai Location within Tamil Nadu Location within India
- Coordinates: 13.175729°N 80.238169°E
- Country: India
- State: Tamil Nadu
- District: Chennai
- Metro: Chennai
- Elevation: 3 m (9.8 ft)

Languages
  - Official: Tamil
- Time zone: UTC+5:30 (IST)
- PIN: 600121
- Telephone code: 044
- Vehicle registration: TN-20-xxxx & TN-18-xxxx(new)
- Planning agency: CMDA
- City: Chennai
- Lok Sabha constituency: North Chennai
- Vidhan Sabha constituency: Madhavaram

Theeyampakkam (Tamil: தீயம்பாக்கம்), is a developing residential area in North Chennai, a metropolitan city in Tamil Nadu, India.

== Location ==
Theeyampakkam is located in North Chennai with Andarkuppam in the east and Mathur to the South. Other neighbouring areas include Manali, Madhavaram, Kodungaiyur.

The arterial roads to Theeyampakkam are the Anna Salai (Andarkuppam-Redhills Road), Madhavaram Milk Colony Road and the Kamarajar Salai. With the Inner Ring Road becoming functional the area was easily accessible from the Chennai Mofussil Bus Terminus.
