= Vichoor =

- Neighborhood
- Location within Chennai Location within Tamil Nadu Location within India
- Coordinates: 13.219538°N 80.247467°E
- Country: India
- State: Tamil Nadu
- District: Tiruvallur
- Metro: Chennai
- Elevation: 3 m (9.8 ft)

Population (2011)
  - Total: 5,765

Languages
  - Official: Tamil
- Time zone: UTC+5:30 (IST)
- PIN: 600103
- Telephone code: 044
- Vehicle registration: TN-20-xxxx & TN-18-xxxx(new)
- Planning agency: CMDA
- City: Chennai
- Lok Sabha constituency: North Chennai
- Vidhan Sabha constituency: Ponneri

Vichoor is a village in North Chennai, a metropolitan city in Tamil Nadu, India. Most of the people from this area is migrating to the nearby township at Manali New Town for a safer residence.
