= Chinnasekkadu =

- Neighbourhood
- Chinnasekkadu (Chennai) Chinnasekkadu (Tamil Nadu) Chinnasekkadu (India)
- Coordinates: 13.163000°N 80.261400°E
- Country: India
- State: Tamil Nadu
- District: Chennai
- Metro: Chennai
- Zone: Madhavaram Zone No 3
- Ward: Chinnasekkadu (Ward 29)
- Elevation: 31 m (102 ft)

Population (2018)
  - Total: 15,000

Languages
  - Official: Tamil
- Time zone: UTC+5:30 (IST)
- PIN: 600068
- Telephone code: 044-2594
- Vehicle registration: TN-20-xxxx & TN-18-xxxx(new)
- Civic agency: Corporation of Chennai
- Planning agency: CMDA
- City: Chennai

Chinnasekkadu is a neighbourhood of Chennai in Chennai district in the state of Tamil Nadu, India. Chinnasekkadu used to be a town panchayat in Thiruvallur district. In 2011, the Chinnasekkadu town Panchayat was merged with Chennai Corporation. Chinnasekkadu comes under ward 29 in Zone 3 (Madhavaram) of Chennai Corporation.

== Geography ==
Chinnasekkadu is located at 13.17°N 80.26°E. It has an average elevation of 11 metres (36 feet).

== Demographics ==
As of 2001 India census, Chinnasekkadu had a population of 9744. Males constitute 52% of the population and females 48%. Chinnasekkadu has an average literacy rate of 75%, higher than the national average of 59.5%; with male literacy of 81% and female literacy of 69%. 12% of the population is under 6 years of age.
