= Purasawalkam (disambiguation) =

Purasawalkam is a neighbourhood in the northern region of Chennai, Tamil Nadu, India.

Purasawalkam may also refer to:

- Purasawalkam (state assembly constituency)
- Purasawalkam taluk
