= Manjambakkam =

- Neighbourhood
- Manjambakkam(Chennai) Manjambakkam (Tamil Nadu) Manjambakkam (India)
- Coordinates: 13.166913°N 80.229421°E
- Country: India
- State: Tamil Nadu
- District: Chennai
- Metro: Chennai
- Elevation: 3 m (9.8 ft)

Languages
  - Official: Tamil
- Time zone: UTC+5:30 (IST)
- PIN: 600 060
- Telephone code: 044
- Vehicle registration: TN 18 (RTO, Red Hills)
- Planning agency: CMDA
- City: Chennai
- Lok Sabha constituency: North Chennai
- Vidhan Sabha constituency: Madhavaram

Manjambakkam is a developing residential area in North Chennai, a metropolitan city in Tamil Nadu, India
