= Tamil Nadu Petroproducts Limited =

Tamil Nadu Petro-products Limited
- Type: Public
- Traded as: BSE: 500777; NSE: TNPETRO
- Industry: Chemicals
- Founded: 22 June 1984
- Headquarters: Tamil Nadu, India
- Products: linear alkyl benzene, epichlorohydrin and caustic soda
- Subsidiaries: SPIC Electric Power Corporation Private Ltd (SEPC); Certus Investment and Trading Ltd; Proteus Petrochemicals Private Ltd
- Website: tnpetro.com

Tamil Nadu Petro-products Limited is an Indian company, engaged in the manufacture and sale of commodity chemicals. The products are used as raw materials in industries involved in the manufacture of detergents and cleaning agents, lubricants, epoxy resins, pharmaceuticals and textiles. The company was founded in 1984 and is based in Manali, Chennai, India.

It was promoted by the Tamil Nadu Industrial Development Corporation Ltd. (TIDCO). In October 1984, TIDCO inducted Southern Petrochemical Industries Corporation Ltd. (SPIC) as a joint sector associate in setting up a project for the manufacture of 50,000 tonnes per annum of linear alkyl benzene (LAB).

The company posted a profit of 46.71 crore in the fiscal year 2017–18, declaring a dividend for 2017–18.
