= Administrative divisions of Chennai =

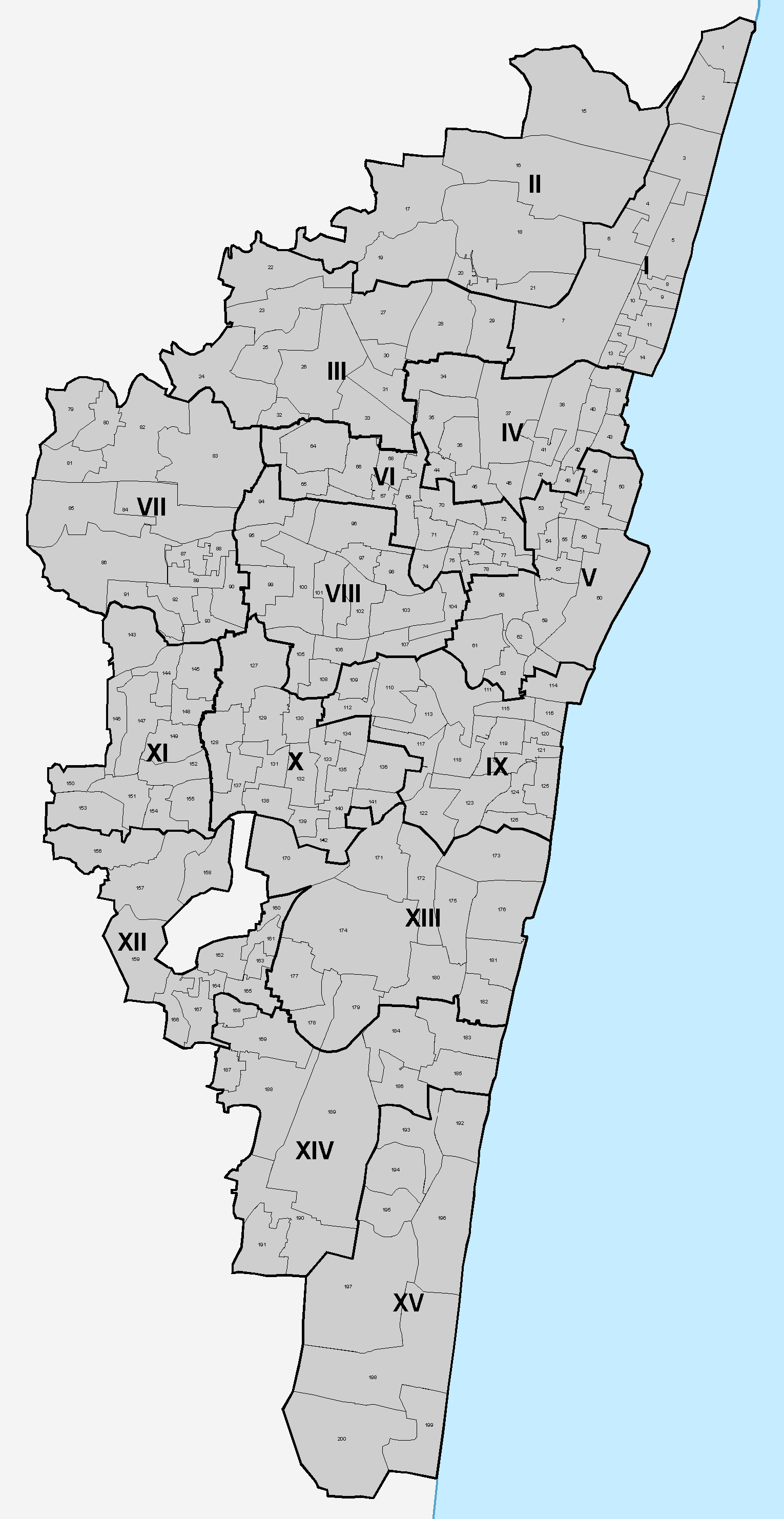
15 Zones of the Chennai Corporation after expansion

The city of Chennai in Tamil Nadu, India, is managed by the Corporation of Chennai. Established as Madras Corporation in 1688, it is the oldest municipal body in India. It is headed by a mayor, who presides over 200 councillors each of whom represents a ward. The current mayor of Chennai was elected on 4 March 2022.

Prior to its expansion in late 2011, the city occupied an area of 174 km^{2} (67 sq mi); its merger with 42 local bodies at that time more than doubled its extent, resulting in a combined area of 426 km^{2} (164 sq mi). Chennai Corporation absorbed seven municipalities, three town panchayats and 13 panchayat unions in Tiruvallur district and two municipalities, five town panchayats and 12 panchayat unions in Kanchipuram district. A total of nine municipalities merged into the city: Alandur, Ambattur, Kattivakkam, Madhavaram, Maduravoyal, Manali, Tiruvottiyur, Ullagaram-Puzhuthivakkam and Valasaravakkam. A total of eight town panchayats merged into the city: Chinnasekkadu, Puzhal, Porur, Nandambakkam, Meenambakkam, Perungudi, Pallikaranai, Sholinganallur. A total of twenty-six village panchayats merged into the city: Edayanchavadi, Sadayankuppam, Kadapakkam, Theeyampakkam, Mathur, Vadaperumbakkam, Surapet, Kathirvedu, Puthagaram, Nolambur, Karambakkam, Nerkundram, Ramapuram, Mugalivakkam, Manapakkam, Kottivakkam, Palavakkam, Neelankarai, Injambakkam, Karapakkam, Okkiyam-Thuraipakkam, Madipakkam, Madipakkam-B / Madipakkam-II (only revenue and disaster management merged with Zone-14 Puzhuthivakkam of the city, local body administration is under Kovilambakkam rural village panchayat), Jaladampet, Semmencherry, and Uthandi.

The expanded city contains 4.41 million voters and was re-organised into 15 zones consisting of 200 wards. The newly annexed areas were divided into 93 wards, and the remaining 107 wards were created out of the original 155 within the old city limits. As of September 2011, the new wards are yet to be named. Out of the 200 wards, 26 were reserved for scheduled castes and scheduled tribes and 58 were reserved for women.

== Zones ==
| No. | Zone | Wards | Assembly constituency | Parliamentary constituency | Taluk | District |
|---|---|---|---|---|---|---|
| 1 | Thiruvottiyur | 1 – 14 | Thiruvottiyur | Chennai North | Tiruvottiyur | Chennai |
| 2 | Manali | 15 – 22 | Thiruvottiyur/Madhavaram/Ponneri (Part) | Chennai North/Thiruvallur | Tiruvottiyur/Madhavaram | Chennai |
| 3 | Madhavaram | 23 – 33 | Madhavaram | Thiruvallur | Madhavaram | Chennai |
| 4 | Tondiarpet | 34 – 48 | Perambur/RK Nagar/Royapuram | Chennai North | Tondiarpet | Chennai |
| 5 | Royapuram | 49 – 63 | Royapuram/Harbour/Egmore/Chepauk-Tiruvallikenni | Chennai North/Chennai Central | Egmore/Purasaiwalkam | Chennai |
| 6 | Thiru. Vi. Ka. Nagar | 64 – 78 | Kolathur/Thiru. Vi. Ka. Nagar/Egmore | Chennai North | Perambur/Ayanavaram/Purasaiwalkam | Chennai |
| 7 | Ambattur | 79 – 93 | Ambattur/Maduravoyal(Part) | Sriperumbudur | Ambattur | Chennai |
| 8 | Anna Nagar | 94 – 108 | Villivakkam/Egmore/Anna Nagar | Chennai Central | Ayanavaram/Aminjikarai | Chennai |
| 9 | Teynampet | 109 – 126 | Thousand Lights/Chepauk-Thiruvallikeni/Mylapore | Chennai Central | Mylapore/Egmore | Chennai |
| 10 | Kodambakkam | 127 – 142 | Maduravoyal (Part)/Virugambakkam/T.Nagar/Saidapet | Chennai Central | Mambalam/Guindy/Egmore | Chennai |
| 11 | Valasaravakkam | 143 – 155 | Maduravoyal | Sriperumbudur | Maduravoyal/Alandur | Chennai |
| 12 | Alandur | 156 – 167 | Alandur/Pallavaram (Part)/Sholinganallur (Part) | Sriperumbudur | Alandur | Chennai |
| 13 | Adyar | 168 – 180 | Saidapet/Mylapore/Velachery | Chennai South | Velachery | Chennai |
| 14 | Perungudi | 181 – 191 & Kovilambakkam rural village panchayat wards 3 and 4 | Velachery (Part)/Alandur (Part)/Sholinganallur | Chennai South | Sholinganallur | Chennai |
| 15 | Sholinganallur | 192 – 200 | Sholinganallur | Chennai South | Sholinganallur | Chennai |

== Proposed Zones ==
| New Zone No. | Old Zone | Assembly Constituencies | No of Wards | Ward Numbers | |
|---|---|---|---|---|---|
| 1 | 1, 2 | Madhavaram, Ponneri, Thiruvottriyur | 19 | 1 to 16, 20, 21 | |
| 2 | 2, 3 | Madhavaram, Thiruvottriyur | 14 | 17, 19, 22 to 33 | |
| 3 | 4 | Dr. Radhakrishnan Nagar, Perambur | 11 | 34 to 43, 47 | |
| 4 | 4, 5 | Harbour, Royapuram | 12 | 48 to 57, 59, 60 | |
| 5 | 6 | Thiru.Vi.Ka Nagar, Perambur, Kolathur | 12 | 44 to 46, 64 to 72 | |
| 6 | 7 | Ambattur, Maduravoyal | 13 | 79 to 90, 93 | |
| 7 | 8 | Anna Nagar, Villivakkam | 6 | 94 to 98, 102 to 104 | |
| 5 | 4 | Tondiarpet | Dr. Radhakrishnan Nagar | 7 | 38 to 43, 47 |
| 7 | 5 | Royapuram | Harbour | 6 | 54 to 57, 59, 60 |
| 8 | 6 | Thiru.Vi.Ka Nagar | Thiru. Vi. Kalyanasundranar Nagar | 6 | 71 to 76 |
| 11 | 8 | Anna Nagar | Anna Nagar | 7 | 100 to 103, 105 to 107 |
| 12 | 5, 6, 8 | Royapuram, Thiru.Vi.Ka Nagar, Anna Nagar | Egmore | 6 | 58, 61, 77, 78, 104, 108 |
| 13 | 5, 9 | Royapuram, Teynampet | Chepakkam-Thiruvallikeni | 7 | 62, 63, 114 to 116, 119, 120 |
| 14 | 9 | Teynampet | Aayiramvillaku | 7 | 109 to 113, 117, 118 |
| 15 | 10 | Kodambakkam | Thiyagaraya Nagar | 7 | 130 to 135, 141 |
| 16 | 10 | Kodambakkam | Virugambakkam | 6 | 127 to 129, 136 to 138 |
| 14 | 7, 11 | Maduravoyal | 9 | 91, 92, 143, 144, 146, 147, 150, 151, 153 | |
| 15 | 12 | Alandur, Sholinganallur, Pallavaram | 12 | 156 to 167 | |
| 16 | 10, 13 | Kodambakkam, Adyar | Saidapettai, Velachery | 8 | 139, 140, 142, 168, 169, 172, 175, 176 |
| 17 | 9, 13 | Thirumayilai, Saidapettai, Velachery | 9 | 126, 170, 171, 173, 174, 177 to 180 | |
| 18 | 13 | Velachery, Sholinganallur | 7 | 181 to 184, 192 to 194 | |
| 19 | 14 | Alandur, Sholinganallur | 6 | 185 to 190 | |
| 20 | 15 | Sholinganallur | 9 | 191, 195 to 200 | |

== Other Constituencies in Chennai Metropolitan Area ==
1. Avadi
2. Pallavaram
3. Poonamallee
4. Tambaram
5. Thiruporur

== Other Taluks in Chennai Metropolitan Area ==
1. Avadi
2. Poonamalee
3. Tambaram
4. Pallavaram
5. Vandalur

== Municipalities in Chennai Metropolitan Area ==
=== Tiruvallur District ===
1. Poonamallee
2. Thiruverkadu
3. Thiruninravur

=== Kancheepuram District ===
1. Kunrathur
2. Mangadu

=== Chengalpattu District ===
1. Nandivaram-Guduvancheri
2. Maraimalainagar
3. Chengalpattu

== Town Panchayats in Chennai Metropolitan Area ==
=== Tiruvallur District ===
1. Minjur
2. Naravarikuppam
3. Thirumazhisai
4. Gummidipoondi

=== Kancheepuram District ===
1. Sriperumbudur
2. Walajabad

=== Chengalpattu District ===
1. Thiruporur
2. Mamallapuram

== See also ==
- List of mayors of Chennai
