= Chettimedu =

Village in Tamil Nadu, India

Chettimedu is a small village in Sembanarkoil Taluk in the Mayiladuthurai District of Tamil Nadu State, India. This village comes under Pillaiperumanallur Panchayath.

== Location and access ==
Chettimedu is located 25 kilometers to the east of district headquarters Mayiladuthurai, 12 kilometers from Sembanarkoil and 263 kilometers from State Capital Chennai. It is 0.5 kilometers from the sea, about 2 kilometers from Thirumeignanam and about 4 kilometres from Thirukkadaiyur. The nearest railroad station is Mayiladuthurai, about 25 kilometers away, and bus transport is available from Thirumeignanam and Thirukkadaiyur.

== Economy ==
The major occupation of the people in Chettimedu is groundnut agriculture.

== Religion ==
Chettimedu village people belong to the Hindu caste Padayachi. A temple to Shiva is located in the village.

== See also ==
- Tharangambadi
- Karaikal
- Thirunallar
