= Sadayankuppam =

- Neighbourhood
- Location within Chennai Location within Tamil Nadu Location within India
- Coordinates: 13.189894°N 80.289152°E
- Country: India
- State: Tamil Nadu
- District: Chennai
- Metro: Chennai
- Elevation: 3 m (9.8 ft)

Languages
  - Official: Tamil
- Time zone: UTC+5:30 (IST)
- PIN: 600103
- Telephone code: 044
- Vehicle registration: TN-20-xxxx & TN-18-xxxx(new)
- Governing body: Greater Chennai Corporation
- Planning agency: CMDA
- City: Chennai
- Lok Sabha constituency: North Chennai
- Vidhan Sabha constituency: Thiruvottriyur

Sadayankuppam is a residential/industrial area in northern part of Chennai, a metropolitan city in Tamil Nadu, India. It is the largest ward in Greater Chennai Corporation in terms of area.
