= Guindy Thiru Vi Ka Estate =

Guindy Thiru Vi Ka Industrial Estate
- neighbourhood
- Location within Chennai Location within Tamil Nadu Location within India
- Coordinates: 13.0149°N 80.2093°E
- Country: India
- State: Tamil Nadu
- District: Chennai District
- Metro: Chennai

Government
  - Body: Chennai Corporation

Languages
  - Official: Tamil
- Time zone: UTC+5:30 (IST)
- Planning agency: CMDA
- Civic agency: Chennai Corporation
- Website: www.chennai.tn.nic.in

Guindy Thiru Vi Ka Industrial Estate is a neighbourhood in Chennai, India. This was an active small scale industrial estate in the 1960s and 1970s but is gradually turning to new economy companies. Its central location makes it an attractive proposition for new business.

== See also ==
- Economy of Chennai
