= Kosappur =

Kosappur கொசப்பூர்
- Neighbourhood
- Location within Chennai Location within Tamil Nadu Location within India
- Coordinates: 13.182039°N 80.233519°E
- Country: India
- State: Tamil Nadu
- District: Chennai
- Metro: Chennai
- Elevation: 3 m (9.8 ft)

Languages
  - Official: Tamil
- Time zone: UTC+5:30 (IST)
- PIN: 600060
- Telephone code: 044
- Vehicle registration: TN-20-xxxx & TN-18-xxxx(new)
- Planning agency: CMDA
- City: Chennai
- Lok Sabha constituency: North Chennai
- Assembly constituency: Madhavaram

Kosappur is a developing residential area in North Chennai, India.

== Location ==
Kosappur is located in North Chennai with Mathur, Chinna Mathur and Madhavaram Milk Colony to the South. Other neighbouring areas include Manali, Madhavaram, Manjambakkam, and Chettimedu to the west and Theeyambakkam to the north.

The arterial roads to Kosappur are the Anna Salai (Andarkuppam-Redhills Road), Madhavaram Milk Colony Road and the Kamarajar Salai. This part of Chennai was considered socially unappealing a decade ago. However, due to rapid increase in need for quality affordable residential areas in and around Chennai, Kosappur became popular among real estate developers. With the opening of the Inner Ring Road, the area became easily accessible from the Chennai Mofussil Bus Terminus, MMBT-Madhavaram Mofussil Bus Terminus and increasing its popularity due to the upcoming Metro Rail stations in Madhavaram, Manjampakkam, Assisi Nagar Madhavaram, Venugopal Nagar Madhavaram and its nearby surroundings. Colleges nearby - Apollo Arts and Science College, Jayagovind Harigopal Agarwal Agarsen College. Schools nearby - Olive Tree Global School, Greenfield Chennai International School, Everwin Vidhyashram, St. Joseph's Matriculation School, Beloved Matriculation School, Sri Chaitanya Techno School, Velammal New Gen School Madhavaram

== Transportation ==
Route No	Origin	Destination	Via
64D	Kosappur	Broadway	Mathur, Madhavaram Milk Colony, Moolakadai, Vyasarpadi, Doveton, Chennai Central
36V	Redhills	Thiruvortriyur Bus Station	Kosappur, Mathur, Manali, Wimco Nagar
56V	Red hills	Thiruvortriyur Bus Station	Kosappur, Mathur, Manali, Thiruvottiyur Market
