= Puthagaram =

- village
- Country: India
- State: Tamil Nadu
- District: Nagapattinam

Government
  - Type: Panchayati raj (India)
  - Body: Gram panchayat

Population (2001)
  - Total: 1,713

Languages
  - Official: Tamil
- Time zone: UTC+5:30 (IST)

Puthagaram is a village in Tamil Nadu, India. Here ancient Sri Maha kaliamman Temple is located.

== Demographics ==
As per the 2001 census, Puthagaram had a total population of 1713 with 879 males and 834 females. The sex ratio was 949. The literacy rate was 70.68. Significant section of the population belongs to the Senguntha Mudaliyar's. There celebrate Sri Maha Kaliamman thiruviza ever year second week. This is part of Mudaliar community Festival, all other community people also doing active participation.
