= Madhavaram taluk =

Indian township

Coordinates: 13.15°N 80.24°E

Madhavaram
- Taluk
- Interactive map of Madhavaram

Population (2011)
  - Total: 596,753

Madhavaram taluk is a taluk of Chennai district in the Indian state of Tamil Nadu. The centre of the taluk is the neighbourhood of Madhavaram. The headquarters of the taluk is Tondiarpet division. And the taluk has been bifurcated from Ambattur taluk and on 2018 it has been annexed to Chennai district from tiruvallur by expanding Chennai city. And the taluk Has regions of Kathirvedu, Lakshmipuram, Madhavaram, Madhavaram Milk Colony, Mathur, Ponniammanmedu, Puthagaram, Puzhal, Surapet, Redhills, and the RTO of the taluk is TN 05 (Chennai North).

== History ==
On early 2010, Madhavaram taluk was formed by bifurcation of the large Ambattur taluk in Tiruvallur district.

On early 2014, Madhavaram taluk is bifurcated to Tiruvottiyur taluk to form a new taluk.

On 4 January 2018, Chennai district was expanded by annexing Madhavaram taluk.

== Demographics ==
According to the 2011 census, the taluk of Madhavaram had a population of 596,753 with 301,977 males and 294,776 females. There were 976 women for every 1000 men. The taluk had a literacy rate of 79.41. Child population in the age group below 6 was 30,236 Males and 28,891 Females.

== Revenue Village ==
1. Madhavaram Firka: Kadirvedu, Kosapur, Madhavaram, Manjambakkam, Mathur, Puthagaram, Soorapattu
2. Puzhal Firka: Chettimedu, Puzhal, Vadaperumbakkam, Vilakkupattu
