= Perambur taluk =

Taluk of the city district of Chennai in the Indian state of Tamil Nadu

Coordinates: 13.10727°N 80.24448°E

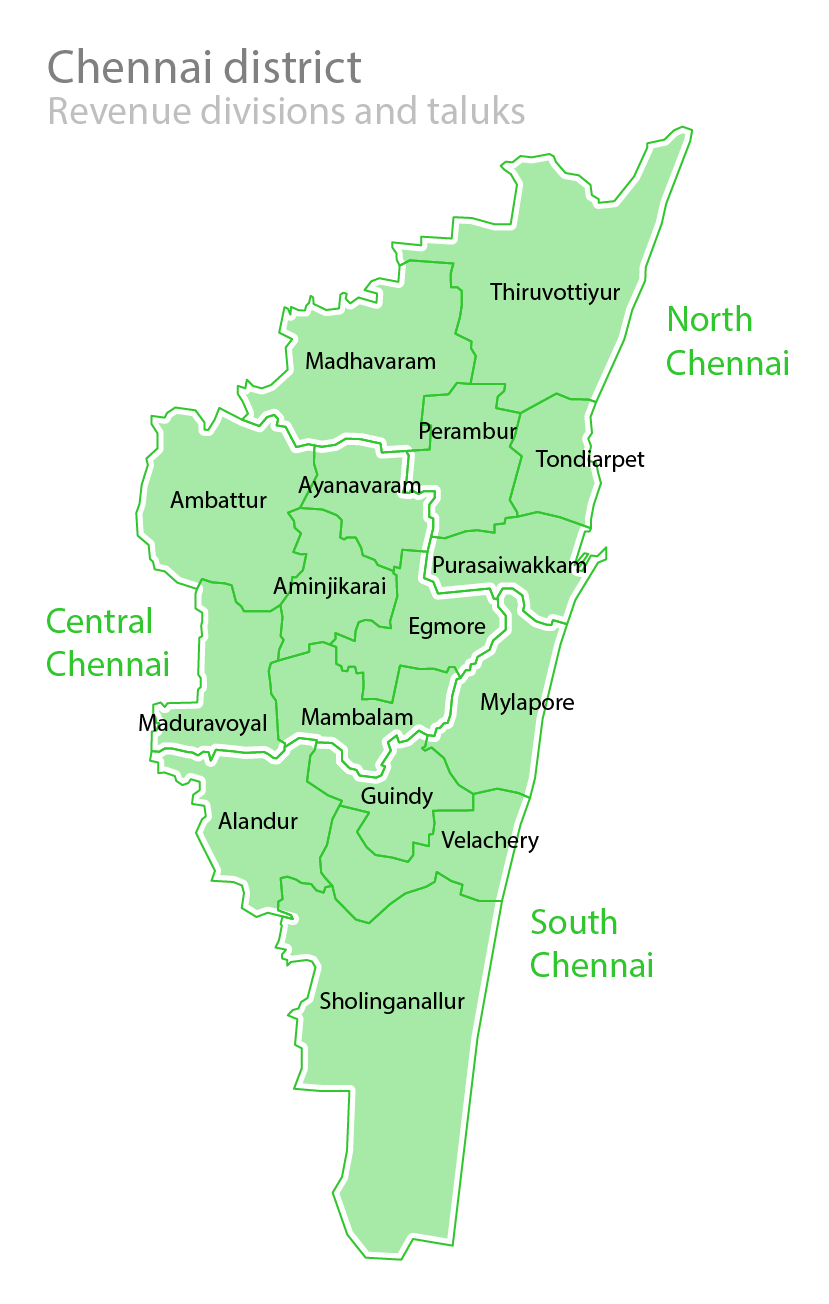
Chennai district map

Perambur taluk is a taluk of the city district of Chennai in the Indian state of Tamil Nadu. It was formed in December 2013 from parts of the erstwhile Fort-Tondiarpet and Perambur-Purasawalkam taluks. It comprises the neighbourhoods of Kodungaiyur, Moolakadai, Madhavaram and Perambur.

Perambur-Purasawalkam taluk

1. Erukanchery Firka: Erukanchery, Perambur (Part 1)
2. Perambur Firka: Perambur (Part 3)
3. Sembium Firka: Perambur (Part 2), Sembium

Fort-Tondiarpet taluk

1. Kondungaiyur Firka: Jambuli, Kondungaiyur, Selaivoyal
