= Tondiarpet taluk =

Taluk of the city district of Chennai

Tondiarpet
- Taluk
- Interactive map of Tondiarpet

Tondiarpet taluk is a taluk of the city district of Chennai in the Indian state of Tamil Nadu. It was formed in December 2013 from parts of the erstwhile Fort-Tondiarpet taluk. It comprises the neighbourhood of Tondiarpet.

Fort-Tondiarpet taluk

1. Korukkupet Firka: Tondiarpet (Part 1)
2. Old Washermanpet Firka: Tondiarpet (Part 3)
3. Royapuram Firka: Tondiarpet (Part 4)
4. Tondiarpet Firka: Tondiarpet (Part 2)
