= Purasawalkam taluk =

Taluk of Chennai district

Coordinates: 13.08593°N 80.25047°E

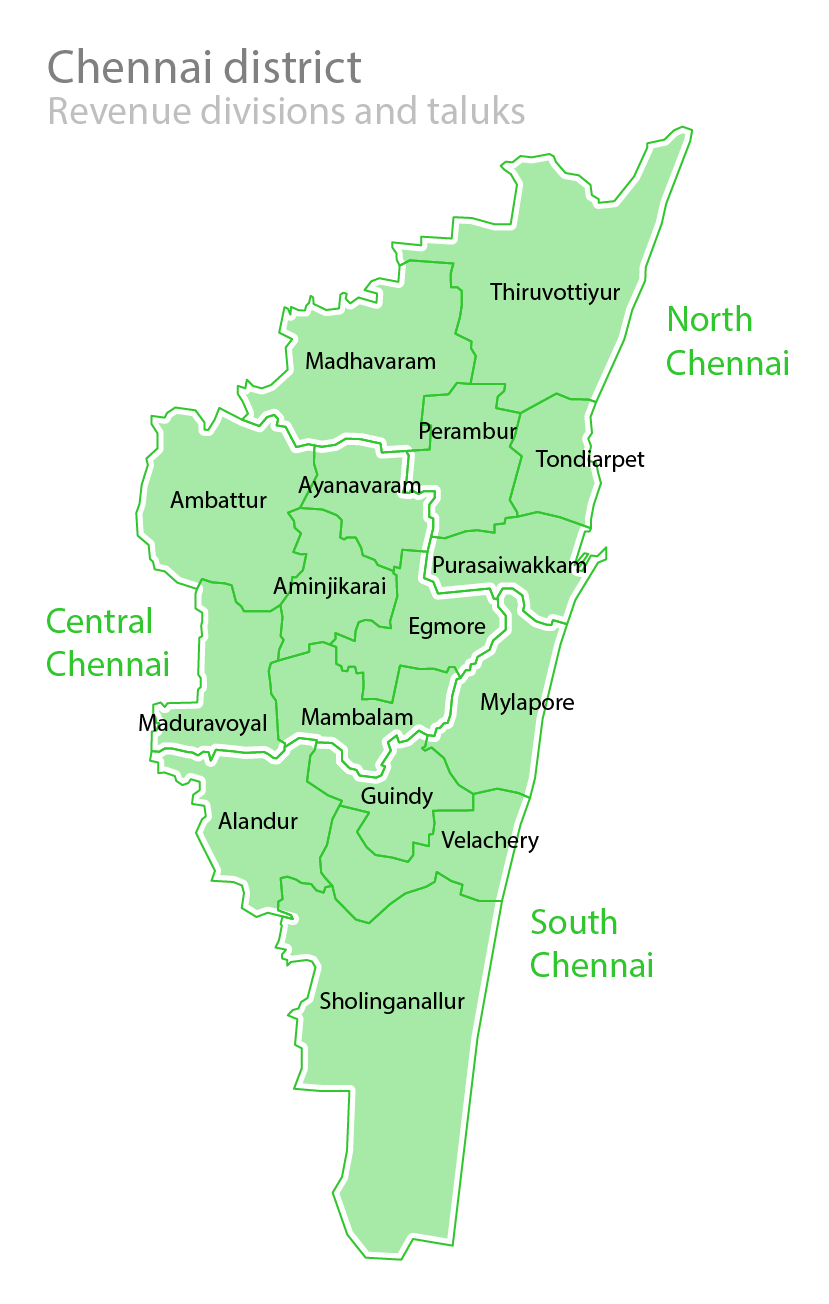
A map of the Chennai district showing all the revenue divisions; Purasaiwalkam is in the far east in North Chennai

Purasaiwalkam taluk is a taluk of the city district of Chennai in the Indian state of Tamil Nadu. It was formed in December 2013 from parts of the erstwhile Fort-Tondiarpet and Perambur-Purasawalkam taluks. It comprises the neighbourhoods of Purasawalkam, Vepery and Periamet.

- Perambur-Purasawalkam taluk
1. Otteri Firka: Pursawalkam West/Pursawalkam (Part 1)
2. Pursawalkam Firka: Purasawalkam East/Purasawalkam (Part 2)
- Fort-Tondiarpet taluk
1. V.O.C Nagar Firka: V.O.C Nagar
2. Vepery Firka: Vepery
