= Mathur, Chennai =

Mathur
- Neighbourhood
- Location within Chennai Location within Tamil Nadu Location within India
- Coordinates: 13.17155°N 80.24748°E
- Country: India
- State: Tamil Nadu
- District: Chennai
- Metro: Chennai
- Zone & Ward: Manali Zone 2 & Ward 19

Area
  - Total: 14.21 km^{2} (5.49 sq mi)
- Elevation: 22 m (72 ft)

Population (2011)
  - Total: 27,674
  - Density: 1,948/km^{2} (5,044/sq mi)

Languages
  - Official: Tamil
- Time zone: UTC+5:30 (IST)
- PIN: 600068
- Telephone code: 044-2555
- Vehicle registration: TN-18-xxxx & TN-20-xxxx (old)
- Civic agency: Greater Chennai Corporation
- Planning agency: CMDA
- City: Chennai
- Vidhan Sabha constituency: Madhavaram
- MP: Tiruvallur, K. Jayakumar, INC
- MLA: Madhavaram S. Sudharsanam, DMK
- MC: Vacant
- Website: http://www.chennaicorporation.gov.in/

Mathur is a residential area located north of Chennai, a metropolitan city in Tamil Nadu, India. Mathur is administered by the Greater Chennai Corporation and belongs to Madhavaram taluk of Chennai district.

== Location ==
Mathur is located north of Chennai with Manali in the east and Madhavaram Milk Colony to the south. Other neighboring areas include Madhavaram, Kosappur and Kodungaiyur.

== History ==
In earlier days Mathur is a rural area comprising the villages Periyamathur and Chinnamathur. In the early 1990s the Tamil Nadu Housing Board and the Madras Metropolitan Development Authority planned and developed a township in the village of Periyamathur and named as Mathur MMDA. In October 2011, the erstwhile Mathur village panchayat is merged with Greater Chennai Corporation and it came under the jurisdiction of Greater Chennai Corporation. Though Mathur was merged into Greater Chennai Corporation on 24 October 2011 it remained as a part of Madhavaram taluk in Thiruvallur district till 15 August 2018 which was later added into Chennai district officially with other areas fall under the Greater Chennai Corporation limits. On 11 June 2020, the Government of Tamil Nadu renamed Mathur as Maaththoor along with other neighborhoods and towns of Tamil Nadu as per the pronunciation in Tamil language and later withdrawn the move within a week.

== Demographics ==
Religious census
Religion	Percent(%)
Hindu	84.40%
Muslim	6.05%
Christian	8.72%
Sikh	0.17%
Buddhist	0.02%
Jain	0.09%
Other	0.05%
No religion	0.39%

According to 2011 census, Mathur had a population of 27,674 with 14,081 males and 13,593 females. A total of 2,980 were under the age of six, constituting 1,607 males and 1,373 females. Scheduled Castes and Scheduled Tribes accounted for 16.57% and .13% of the population, respectively. The average literacy of the town was 80.41%, compared to the national average of 72.99%. The town had a total of 6886 households. There were a total of 10,160 workers, comprising 64 cultivators, 97 main agricultural labourers, 79 in house hold industries, 7,871 other workers, 2,049 marginal workers, 24 marginal cultivators, 99 marginal agricultural labourers, 77 marginal workers in household industries and 1,849 other marginal workers. There were a total of 17,514 non workers. As per the religious census of 2011, Mathur had 84.40% Hindus, 6.05% Muslims, 8.72% Christians, 0.17% Sikhs, 0.02% Buddhists, 0.09% Jains, 0.05% following other religions and 0.39% following no religion or did not indicate any religious preference.

== Transportation ==
MTC Routes

Some of the bus services originated/passing through are as follows:

Note: Ordinary buses are currently called as "Magalir Vidiyal Payana Perunthu" since 2021

Ordinary	Express	Deluxe

MTC Routes
Route	Origin	Destination	Via	Status	Fare
29D	Mathur	Vivekananda House	Madhavaram MilkColony, Moolakkadai, Perambur, Purasai, Egmore, Triplicane, Pudupet	Running	Ordinary
56Dx	Mathur	Broadway	Chinna Mathur, Manali B.S., CPCL, MFL, Thiruvottriyur Railway Gate, Thangal tollgate, Tondiarpet Depot, Royapuram, Beach Station	Running	Ordinary
64C	Manali	Broadway	Mathur Gate, Moolakkadai, Vyasarpadi Market, Veppery, Chennai Central	Running	Ordinary
64C	Manali	Broadway	Manali Market, Mathur Gate, Moolakkadai, Vyasarpadi Market, Veppery, Chennai Central	Running	Deluxe
38A	Manali	Broadway	Chinna Mathur, Mathur Gate, Moolakkadai, MKB Nagar East, Mint Depot, Beach Station	Running	Ordinary
121A	Manali	CMBT	Manali Market, Mathur Gate, Moolakkadai, Rettery, Thirumangalam	Running	Deluxe
121A	Manali	CMBT	Manali Market, Mathur Gate, Moolakkadai, Rettery, Thirumangalam	Running	Ordinary
121C	Ennore	CMBT	Ernavoor, MFL, Manali Market, Mathur Gate, Moolakkadai, Rettery, Thirumangalam	Running	Ordinary
121C	Ennore	CMBT	Ernavoor, MFL, Manali Market, Mathur Gate, Moolakkadai, Rettery, Thirumangalam	Running	Deluxe
121D	Manali New Town	CMBT	MFL, Manali Market, Mathur Gate, Moolakkadai, Rettery, Thirumangalam	Running	Ordinary
164	Minjur	Perambur	Nappalayam, MFL, Manali Market, Mathur Gate, Thapal petti, Moolakkadai, Perambur Market	Running	Express
164	Minjur	Perambur	Nappalayam, MFL, Manali Market, Mathur Gate, Thapal petti, Moolakkadai, Perambur Market	Running	Ordinary
170Cx	Manali	Guindy TVK Estate	Manali Market, Mathur, Thapal petti, Moolakadai, Don Bosco school, Thiru.Vi.Ka Nagar, Retteri junction, Thirumangalam, MGR CMBT, Vadapalani, Ekkatuthangal	Running	Ordinary
36V	Thiruvottriyur	Red Hills	ITC Lift Gate, MFL, Manali Market, Periya Mathur, Vadakarai	Running	Ordinary

Extinct routes

Route	Origin	Destination	Via	Note
164	Mathur	Perambur	Moolakkadai, Perambur Market	Extended from Mathur to Minjur replacing 64P
64P	Minjur	Perambur	MFL, Mathur, Moolakkadai, Perambur Market	Renamed as 164
38H Extn	Mathur	Broadway	Moolakkadai, Mint, Beach Station	Extended to Manali and renamed as 38A
29Cx (Deluxe)	Mathur	Thiruvanmiyur	Moolakkadai, Perambur, Chetpet, Sterling Road, Mylapore, Adayar	Cut shorted to perambur;cancelled
64B	Minjur	Broadway	MFL, Manali, Mathur, Moolakkadai, Perambur, Veppery, Chennai Central	Replaced by 56P via thiruvottriyur, Mint, Beach station
121B	Minjur	CMBT	MFL, Moolakkadai, Rettery, Thirumangalam	Diverted via MFL Manali Road jn. MMBT and renamed as 121
56W	Madhavaram	Vallalar Nagar	Mathur, Manali Market, Thiruvottriyur, Maharani	Cancelled

Some of the buses alternatively run via Mathur if any roads are damaged

Express

Route	Origin	Destination	Via	Diversion Route	Fare
S62	Manali	Perambur	Manali Market, Kodungaiyur, Moolakkadai, Perambur Market	Diverted via Mathur Gate, Thapal petti instead of Kodungaiyur	Express
S63	Manali	Moolakkadai	Manali Market, Chinna Sekkadu, Selavayol, Baljipalayam, KKD Nagar Depot, Erukkanchery	Diverted via Mathur Gate, Thapal Petti	Express

Railways: Thiruvottriyur railway station and Perambur Railway Station are the nearest Railway station in 5 km and 9 km respectively People can board 164 to reach perambur railway station and 56Dx to reach Thiruvottriyur railway station. The station can be accessible by two wheeler vehicles too

== See also ==
- Mathur aeri
- Madhavaram Botanical Garden
