= Andarkuppam =

Andarkuppam, Chennai
- Village
- Location within Chennai Location within India
- Coordinates: 13°11′43″N 80°15′52″E
- Country: India
- State: Tamil Nadu
- District: Thiruvallur
- Metro: Chennai
- Elevation: 3 m (9.8 ft)

Languages
  - Official: Tamil
- Time zone: UTC+5:30 (IST)
- PIN: 601204
- Telephone code: 044
- Vehicle registration: TN-20-xxxx & TN-18-xxxx(new)
- Planning agency: CMDA
- City: Chennai
- Lok Sabha constituency: Thiruvallur
- Vidhan Sabha constituency: Thiruvallur

Andarkuppam, is the fastest developing residential area in North Chennai, near Ponneri in Tamil Nadu, India. The PIN code of Andarkuppam is 603401.

Indigenous people have travelled and settled in the village for agricultural and allied business over the years. The recent surge in world class educational institutions opening up in and around the village has brought people from all over the country making the village as one of densely occupied locality. The major economy of the village still bank on agriculture. The real estate sector has seen a huge upsurge since the beginning of the century. The JICA (Japan International Cooperation Agency) proposed a Smart City development in Ponneri.

In December 2023, a warehouse caught fire in Andarkuppam.
