= Manali, Chennai =

Manali
- Neighborhood / Suburb
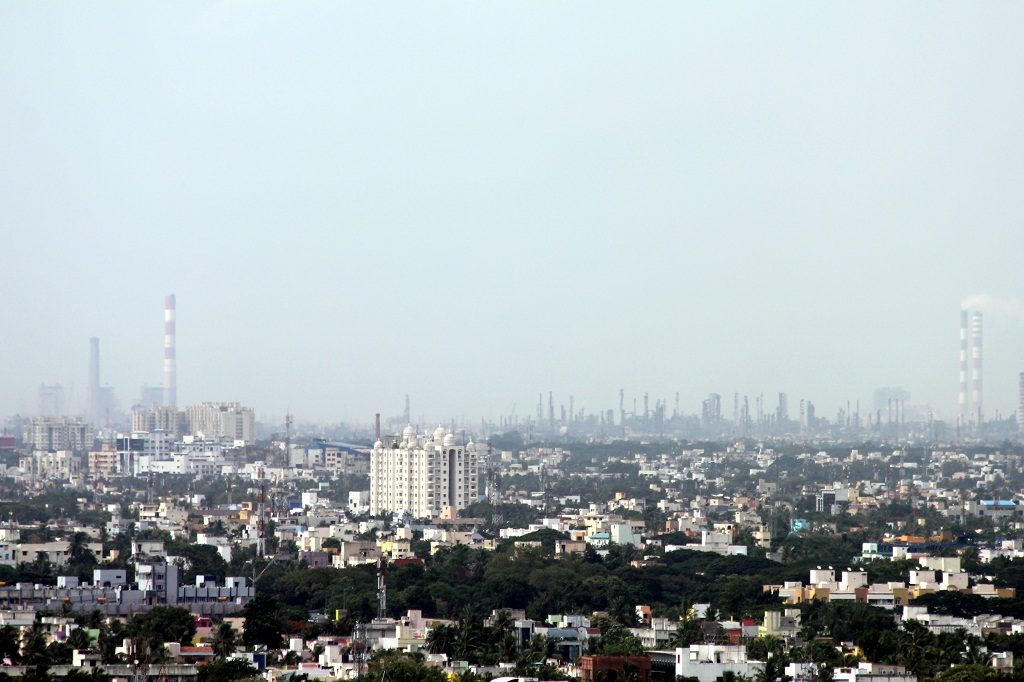
- Manali and Ennore as viewed from St Thomas Mount

- Location in India
- Coordinates: 13.16361°N 80.25856°E
- Country: India
- State: Tamil Nadu
- District: Chennai
- Taluk: Tiruvottiyur
- Metro: Chennai
- Zone: Zone 2 (Manali Zone)
- Wards: Wards 15 to 21
- Elevation: 3 m (9.8 ft)

Population (2011)
  - Total: 35,248

Languages
  - Official: Tamil
- Time zone: UTC+5:30 (IST)
- PIN: 600068
- Telephone code: 044
- Vehicle registration: TN-20
- Civic agency: Greater Chennai Corporation
- Planning agency: CMDA
- City: Chennai
- Lok Sabha constituency: Chennai North
- Vidhan Sabha constituency: Thiruvottiyur

Manali is an industrial and residential part of Chennai, India. It is a zone in Greater Chennai Corporation located in the northern part of Chennai district in the Indian state of Tamil Nadu. As of 2011, the neighborhood had a population of 35,248.

== History ==
In October 2011, the erstwhile Manali municipality of Tiruvallur district merged with Greater Chennai Corporation and later became a part of Chennai district since August 2018.

== Demographics ==
Religious census
Religion	Percent(%)
Hindu	88.02%
Muslim	3.62%
Christian	8.04%
Sikh	0.02%
Buddhist	0.01%
Jain	0.19%
Other	0.09%
No religion	0.0%

According to 2011 census, Manali had a population of 35,248 with a sex-ratio of 968 females for every 1,000 males, much above the national average of 929. A total of 4,208 were under the age of six, constituting 2,194 males and 2,014 females. Scheduled Castes and Scheduled Tribes accounted for 23.33% and 0.09% of the population respectively. The average literacy of the town was 74.52%, compared to the national average of 72.99%. The town had a total of : 9331 households. There were a total of 12,745 workers, comprising 25 cultivators, 49 main agricultural labourers, 127 in house hold industries, 11,293 other workers, 1,251 marginal workers, 12 marginal cultivators, 12 marginal agricultural labourers, 39 marginal workers in household industries and 1,188 other marginal workers. As per the religious census of 2011, Manali had 88.02% Hindus, 3.62% Muslims, 8.04% Christians, 0.02% Sikhs, 0.01% Buddhists, 0.19% Jains, 0.09% following other religions and 0.0% following no religion or did not indicate any religious preference.

== Location and surroundings ==
Manali is a neighborhood of Chennai city. It borders Tiruvottiyur to the east,. Madhavaram to the west, Kodungaiyur to the south, 100 ft road and Manali New Town to the North. The main thoroughfares in the area are Kamarajar Salai, Chinnamathur road, School street, Nedunchezhian street and Parthasarathy street.

== Manali Zone ==
The Manali Zone was named as Zone 2 of Chennai Corporation. The Manali Zone contains 7 wards out of Chennai Corporation's 200 wards from ward 15 to ward 21.

== Roads ==
=== Expressway ===
Manali Expressway(100 feet road) runs on the north of Manali and terminates at Thiruvottriyur–Ponneri High Road and joins with Manali High Road.

=== Other main roads ===
Other main roads in Manali are Kamarajar Road, School Street, Nedunchezhian Road, Chinnamathur Road and Manali Oil Refinery Road.

== Transportation ==
Tiruvottiyur railway station and Perambur railway station are the nearest railway stations of Manali, which are 4 km and 8 km away, respectively. Metropolitan Transport Corporation (MTC) runs passenger buses to Manali from other major parts of the Chennai city. Some of the bus services are :

Normal	Express	Deluxe	AC Volvo	Night

MTC Routes
Route	Origin	Destination	Via	Status	Fare
56D	Manali	Broadway	CPCL, Thiruvottriyur Railway station, Thangal Tollgate, Tondiarpet Depot, Royapuram, Beach Station	Running	Normal
56D	Manali	Broadway	CPCL, Thiruvottriyur Railway station, Thangal Tollgate, Tondiarpet Depot, Royapuram, Beach Station	Running	Deluxe
44	Manali	Broadway	CPCL, IOC, Maharani theatre, Korukkupet, Mint, Stanley Hospital, Beach Station	Running	Normal
64C	Manali	Broadway	Mathur MMDA, Moolakkadai, Vyasarpadi Market, Doveton, MGR Central Station	Running (At times run via chinna mathur instead of Manali Market)	Normal
64C	Manali	Broadway	Mathur MMDA, Moolakkadai, Vyasarpadi Market, Doveton, MGR Central Station	Running	Deluxe
38A	Manali	Broadway	Chinna Mathur, Mathur, Moolakkadai, MKB Nagar East, Mint, Beach Station	Running	Normal
121A	Manali	CMBT	Manali Market, Mathur, Moolakkadai, Retteri junction, Thirumangalam	Running	Deluxe
121A	Manali	CMBT	Manali Market, Mathur, Moolakkadai, Retteri junction, Thirumangalam	Running	Normal
121M Extn	Manali	CMBT	Periya Mathur, Manjambakkam, ThapalPetti, Moolakkadai, Retteri, Thirumangalam	Running	Normal
S62	Manali	Perambur	Manali Market, Kodungaiyur (Paravthi Nagar), Moolakkadai, Perambur Market	Running	Express
S63	Manali	Moolakadai	Manali Market, Balajipalayam, selavayol, Vyasarpadi Sidco, Erukkanchery	Running	Express
S56	Manali	Thiruvottriyur	MFL, ITC Lift gate, Thiruvottriyur Ajax	Running;CMRL service	Express
170C Extn	Manali	Guindy Industrial Estate	Mathur, Moolakkadai, TVK Nagar, Retteri, CMBT, Vadapalani, Ekkatuthangal	Running	Express

Buses passing through Manali

MTC Routes
Route	Origin	Destination	Via	Status	Fare
121	Minjur	CMBT	Nappalayam, MFL Manali Road, Manali B.S., Manjambakkam, MMBT, Retteri	Running	Deluxe
164	Minjur	Perambur	Nappalayam, Manali New Town, MFL, Manali Market, Mathur, Moolakkadai, Perambur Market	Running	Express
56DET	Mathur	Broadway	Manali B.S., MFL, Thiruvottriyur R.S., Tondiarpet, Royapuram, Beach station	Running	Normal
121C	CMBT	Ennore	Thirumangalam, MMBT, Manali, ITC Lift Gate, Ernavoor	Running	Normal
121D	CMBT	Manali New Town	Thirumangalam, Retteri, MMBT, Manali, Andarkuppam	Running	Normal
36V	Sengundram	Thiruvottriyur	Vadakarai, vadaperumbakkam, periya mathur, Manali market, MFL, Thiruvotriyur Ajax	Running	Normal

== Industries ==
- Chennai Petroleum Corporation Limited (CPCL)—Chennai Petroleum Corporation Limited (formerly MRL) is the largest company in Manali. Started in 1969, CPCL's Manali Refinery now has a capacity of 10.5 million tonnes per year and is one of the most complex refineries in India with fuel, lube, wax and petrochemical feedstocks production facilities. Other industries located in Manali are as follows:
- Madras Fertilizers Limited (MFL)
- Tamil Nadu Petroproducts Limited (TPL)
