= Manali Pudhunagar =

Manali Pudhunagar மணலி புதுநகர் Manali New Town
- Neighbourhood
- Location within Chennai Location within Tamil Nadu Location within India
- Coordinates: 13.208028°N 80.271585°E
- Country: India
- State: Tamil Nadu
- Metro: Chennai

Languages
  - Official: Tamil
- Time zone: UTC+5:30 (IST)
- PIN: 600103
- Telephone code: 2593****
- Vehicle registration: TN-18

Manali Pudhunagar (Tamil: மணலி புதுநகர்) also known as Manali New Town is a neighbourhood developed by CMDA that falls under the newly formed Tiruvottiyur taluk of North Chennai Revenue Division of Chennai city in the Indian state of Tamil Nadu.

== Development and controversies ==
Manali Pudhunagar was among the first areas to receive desalinated water from the Minjur desalination plant.

Though Manali Pudhunagar was created as a satellite township by CMDA in the 1980s, CMDA has yet to hand it over to the local bodies concerned with the better development of civic amenities.
