= Tiruvottiyur taluk =

Taluk of the city district of Chennai

Tiruvottiyur
- Taluk
- Interactive map of Tiruvottiyur

Tiruvottiyur taluk is a taluk of the city district of Chennai in the Indian state of Tamil Nadu. The centre of the taluk is the neighbourhood of Tiruvottiyur. The headquarters of the taluk is Tondiarpet division.

Tiruvottiyur, Ennore, Kathivakkam, Manali, Manali New Town are some of the important areas that falls under the jurisdiction of Tiruvottiyur taluk. The taluk is carved out from Madhavaram taluk to form new taluk in Tiruvallur district in 2014. On 4 January 2018, Chennai district was increased by annexing Tiruvottiyur taluk.

== Politics ==
Tiruvottiyur taluk is a part of the Thiruvottiyur (state assembly constituency) and Chennai North (Lok Sabha constituency). Tiruvotriyur K P Shankar (from DMK) is the Member of Legislative Assembly from Thiruvottiyur in the 16th Tamil Nadu Assembly elected on 7 May 2021.
