= Greater Chennai Corporation =

Local government of Chennai City

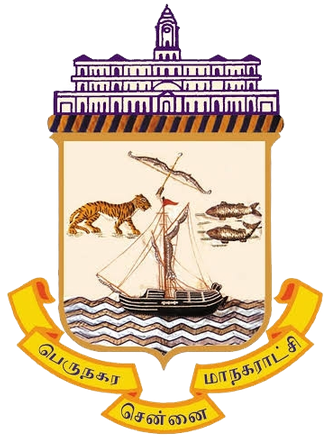
- Emblem of the Greater Chennai Corporation

Type
- Type: Municipal corporation of the Chennai District

History
- Founded: 29 September 1688 (338 years ago)

Leadership
- Mayor: Priya Rajan, DMK since 4 March 2022
- Deputy Mayor: Mahesh Kumar, DMK since 4 March 2022
- Commissioner: G. S. Sameeran, IAS
- District Collector: Malathi Helan, IAS

Structure
- Seats: 200
- Political groups: Government (153): DMK (153); Opposition (25): SSJVA (25); INC (13); VCK (4); IUML (1); CPI(M) (4); MDMK (2); CPI (1); Others (22): AIADMK+ (18); AIADMK (15); BJP (2); AMMK (1); IND (4)

Elections
- Last election: 19 February 2022
- Next election: 2027

Meeting place
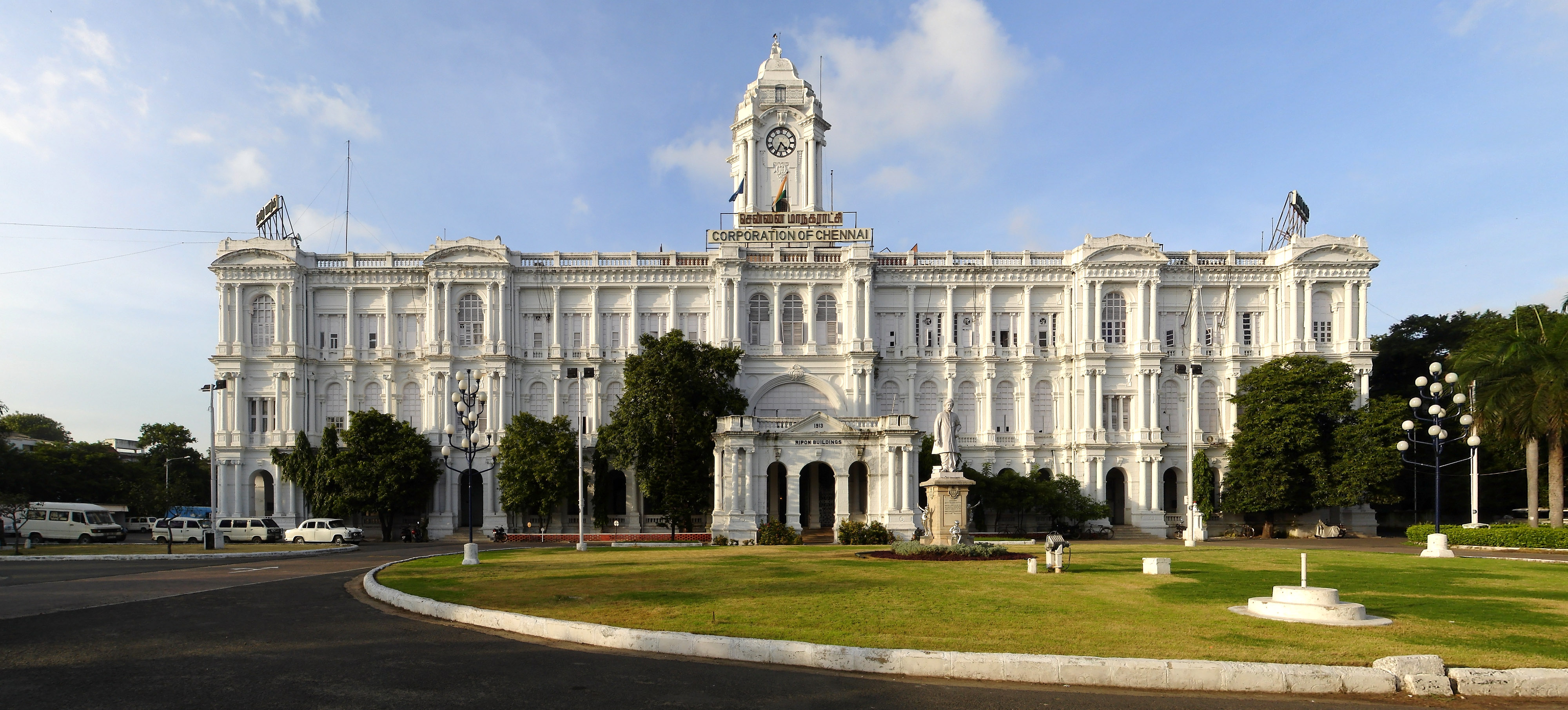
- Ripon Building, Chennai, Tamil Nadu, India

Website
- chennaicorporation.gov.in

Greater Chennai Corporation (GCC) is the local government for the City of Chennai in the Chennai Metropolitan Area of Tamil Nadu, India. Inaugurated as the Corporation of Madras on 29 September 1688, under a royal charter issued by King James II on 30 December 1687, it is the oldest municipal body in the Commonwealth of Nations outside Britain. It is the second oldest municipal corporation in the world after the City of London. The body is the largest municipal corporation in Tamil Nadu, with an area of 426 km^{2}.

The corporation is headed by a mayor, who presides over 200 councillors, each of whom represents one of the 200 wards of the city. The city limits, which had been expanded several times over the years, is coterminous with the Chennai district. It is one of the four municipal corporations located within the Chennai Metropolitan Area, the other three being the Tambaram Corporation, Avadi City Municipal Corporation and Kanchipuram Municipal Corporation.

== History ==
The Madras Corporation is the oldest municipal body in the Commonwealth of Nations outside the United Kingdom. It was formed in 1688 to control the powers of the Governor of Madras, Elihu Yale. The corporation was created by a royal charter issued on 30 December 1687 by King James II on the advice of the chairman of the East India Company, Josiah Child, on the model of Dutch government in the East Indies. The charter constituted the existing town of Fort St. George and all the territories belonging to the town, not exceeding a distance of ten miles from the fort, into a corporation. An 1792 act of the Imperial Parliament conferred the new corporation power to levy municipal taxes in the city. The municipal administration also commenced from this act, making provision for the administration of the city. The Municipal Act continued to be amended, constantly introducing major changes in the constitution and powers of the corporation from time to time.

Prior to the establishments of the corporation, the Governor of Madras or the company's agent managed the affairs of the Fort St George and its residents with the assistance of a headman, an accountant, and the head of watch and ward. The governor sat as Madras's Justice of the Peace. Taxes were introduced by Governor Streynsham Master (1678–1681). Complications arising out of these impositions and the growing expenses of an expanding town led to Sir Josiah drawing up plans for a more formal body of civic administration. The corporation was inaugurated on 29 September 1688 with power to decide on petty cases, levy rates upon the inhabitants for building of schools, a town hall and a jail, when the new mayor, 12 aldermen and 60 burgesses took their oaths. The first members of the corporation were representatives from diverse ethnicities. Nathaniel Higginson was the first Mayor, and he appointed representatives from the English, Scottish, French, Portuguese, and Indian mercantile communities as aldermen. The post of the mayor was held for one year at a time, the mayor being elected by the aldermen, whose term of office was for life.

By 1856, the duties of the corporation became more clearly defined. In 1919, the aldermen were re-styled as 'councillors'. The title of 'mayor' had been replaced by 'president', and P. Theagaraya Chetty was nominated as president, the first Indian to be so chosen. However, the office of Mayor was re-created in 1933, when Kumararajah M. A. Muthiah Chettiar made the transition from last president to first new mayor. The mayoralty has remained thereafter.

By 1901, the corporation had grown to encompass an area of 68 sq km comprising 30 territorial divisions with a population of 540,000. In 1913, the corporation moved to the newly constructed Ripon Building, which was built on parts of the People's Park. The building was named after Lord Ripon who, as Viceroy of India from 1880 to 1884, had introduced local government reforms. He is remembered in a statue in the Corporation precincts. The first native Indian to both govern the Madras Presidency and later serve as Mayor of erstwhile Madras was the Honourable K. Sriramulu Naidu, who served during the 1930s and 1940s. In 1978, the boundaries of the area administered by the corporation was increased to 174 sq km.

The Madras Municipal Corporation Act, 1919 (as amended) provides the basic statutory authority for the administration now.

Major expansions
Year	Changes made	Increase/Decrease in Area (in square miles)	Particulars of places included/excluded	Refs
1931			East Mambalam
1946	Inclusion of 30 revenue villages from Saidapet taluk of Chingleput District resulting in increase of area from 29.50 to 49.50 square miles	20	Sembiam, Siruvallur, Peruvallur, Chinna Chembarambakkam, Ayanavaram, Puliyur, Saligrammam (Part), Mambalam, Kodambakkam, Saidapet, Government Farm, Adyar, Mullam, Aminjikarai, Periakudal, Naduvakkarai, Chinnakudal, Arumbakkam, Agaram (Vada), Velachery (Part), Urur, Kottur, Pallipattu, Kalikunram, Guindy Park, Ekkaduthangal, Alandur, Thirumangalam
1978	Inclusion of 11 eleven town panchayats and 1 village panchayat from Saidapet taluk		Thiruvanmiyur, Virugambakkam, Kanagam and Taramani, Velachery, Saligrammam, Kodambakkam Town Panchayat, Villivakkam, Erukkancheri, Koyambedu, Kolathur, Thirumangalam, Kodungaiyur
2011	Inclusion of 42 small bodies, including 9 municipalities, 8 town panchayats and 25 village panchayats from Ambattur, Ponneri and Poonamallee taluks of Tiruvallur district and Tambaram and Sriperumbudur taluks of Kancheepuram district		Municipalities of Kathivakkam, Tiruvottiyur, Manali, Madhavaram, Ambattur, Maduravoyal, Valasaravakkam, Alandur and Ullagaram–Puzhuthivakkam; Town panchayats of Chinnasekkadu, Puzhal, Porur, Nandambakkam, Meenambakkam, Perungudi, Pallikaranai and Sholinganallur

== Administration ==
City officials, as of March 2026
Mayor	Priya Rajan
Deputy Mayor	M. Mahesh Kumar
Corporation Commissioner	G. S. Sameeran
Commissioner of Police	A. Amalraj

From among themselves, the councillors elect the mayor and a deputy mayor who preside over about 10 standing committees. The council normally meets once a month. The executive wing is headed by the Commissioner. In addition, there are deputy commissioners, various heads of departments and 15 zonal officers.

The first native Indian to govern the Madras Presidency as well as serve later as the first Mayor post-independence of erstwhile Madras was L. Sriramulu Naidu. Chennai, the capital of Tamil Nadu state, houses the state executive and legislative headquarters primarily in the Secretariat Buildings on the Fort St George campus but also in several other buildings in the city. The Madras High Court, whose jurisdiction extends across Tamil Nadu and Puducherry, is the highest judicial authority in the state. The district of Chennai has four parliamentary constituencies—Chennai North, Chennai Central, Chennai South and Sriperumbudur, which elects 29 members of the legislative assembly (MLAs) to the state legislature.

The metropolitan region of Chennai covers many suburbs that are part of Chengalpattu, Kanchipuram and Thiruvallur districts. The larger suburbs are governed by town municipalities, and the smaller ones are governed by town councils called panchayats. While the city covers an area of 174 km^{2} (67 sq mi), the metropolitan area is spread over 1,189 km^{2} (459 sq mi). The Chennai Metropolitan Development Authority (CMDA) has drafted a Second Master Plan that aims to develop satellite townships around the city. Contiguous satellite towns include Mahabalipuram to the south, Chengalpattu and Maraimalai Nagar to the southwest, and Kanchipuram, Sriperumpudur, Tiruvallur and Arakkonam to the west.

=== Administrative divisions ===
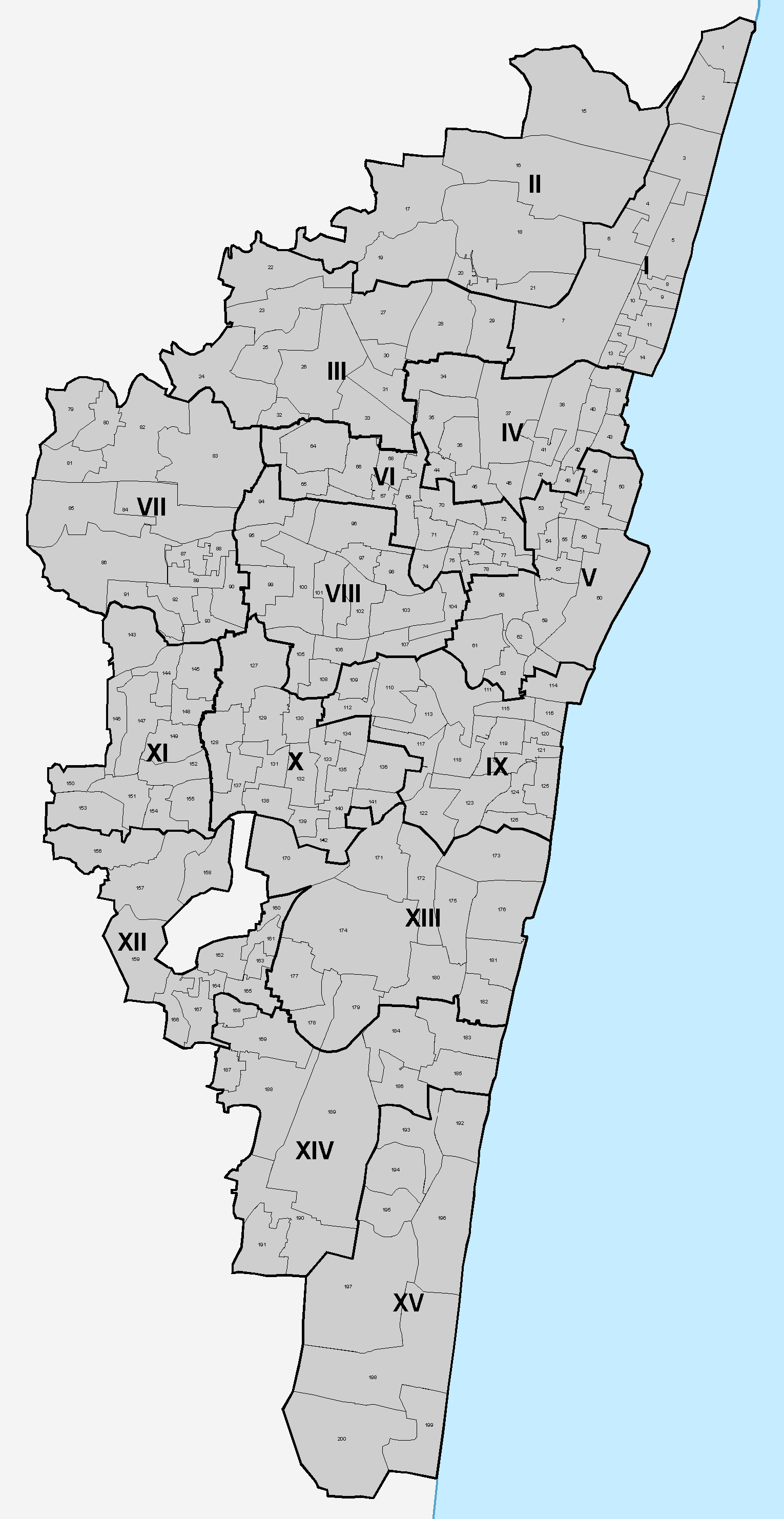
15 zones of the Chennai Corporation after expansion

The city is classified into three regions: North Chennai, Central Chennai and South Chennai. It is further divided into 15 zones, consisting of 200 wards. The newly annexed areas were divided into 93 wards, and the remaining 107 wards were created out of the original 155 within the old city limits. As of September 2011, the new wards are yet to be named. Out of the 200 wards, 26 were reserved for scheduled castes and scheduled tribes and 58 were reserved for women.

The 15 Zones are:

North Chennai

1. Thiruvottiyur
2. Manali
3. Madhavaram
4. Tondiarpet
5. Royapuram

Central Chennai

6. Thiru.Vi.Ka Nagar
7. Ambattur
8. Anna Nagar
9. Teynampet
10. Kodambakkam

South Chennai

11. Valasaravakkam
12. Alandur
13. Adyar
14. Perungudi
15. Sholinganallur

== Elections ==
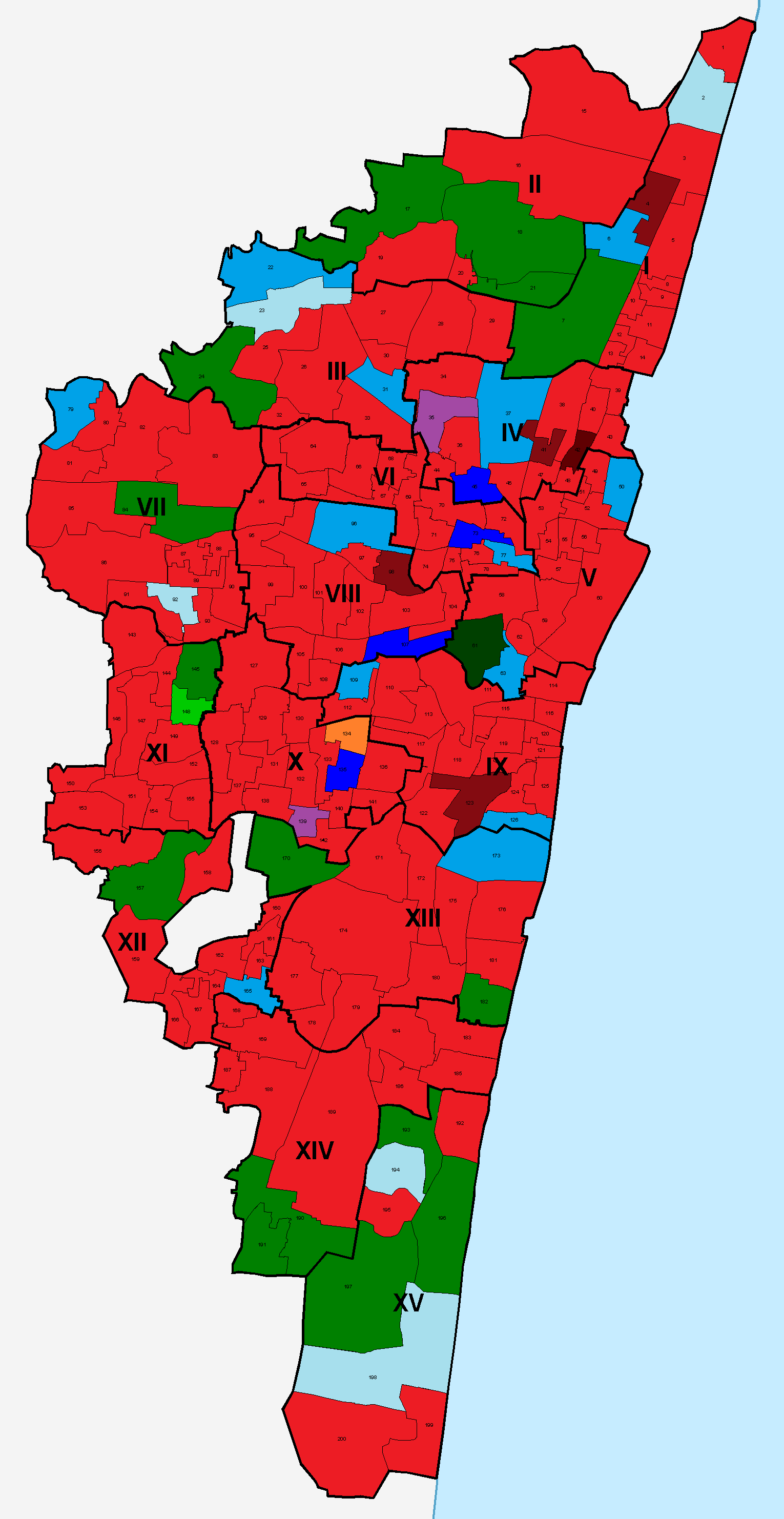
2022 Chennai Municipal Corporation Election Dravida Munnetra Kazhagam: 153 seats Indian National Congress: 13 seats Communist Party of India (Marxist): 4 seats Communist Party of India: 1 seat Amma Makkal Munnetra Kazhagam: 1 seat Viduthalai Chiruthaigal Katchi: 4 seats Indian Union Muslim League: 1 seat Marumalarchi Dravida Munnetra Kazhagam: 2 seats All India Anna Dravida Munnetra Kazhagam: 15 seats Bharatiya Janata Party: 1 seat Independent : 5 seats

The seats of the Mayor, Deputy Mayor and the Greater Chennai Corporation Council have been vacant since 2016. As part of the 2022 Tamil Nadu urban civic body elections, the Greater Chennai Corporation went to polling on 19 February 2022, alongside 20 other municipal corporations of Tamil Nadu, to elect 200 councillors to represent the city's 200 wards; the councillors will choose one amongst themselves as the Mayor of Chennai, a historically significant, coveted office. The Government of Tamil Nadu had announced that the Mayor's seat has been reserved for a Scheduled Caste woman this time. The election results were announced on 22 February 2022 by the Tamil Nadu State Election Commission. The Dravida Munnetra Kazhagam (DMK) won 153 out of the total 200 wards in Chennai, with the other parties in its Secular Progressive Alliance winning 25 more seats—13 for Indian National Congress, four for Communist Party of India – Marxist (CPI-M), four for Viduthalai Chiruthaigal Katchi (VCK), two for Marumalarchi Dravida Munnetra Kazhagam (MDMK), one each for Communist Party of India (CPI) and Indian Union Muslim League (IUML). The All India Anna Dravida Munnetra Kazhagam (AIADMK) won 15 seats. The Bharatiya Janata Party (BJP), the ruling party of the Union Government of India, won one seat. The Amma Makkal Munnettra Kazagam (AMMK) also won a seat. Aside parties, five independent candidates won in their respective wards. The councillors formally elected the Mayor and the Deputy Mayor on 4 March 2022. Having secured an absolute majority, the DMK's mayoral candidate Priya Rajan became the 46th Mayor of Chennai, unopposed. She is the youngest mayor in Chennai's history (aged 28), and the first Dalit woman to hold the office.

== Emblem ==
During the British period the Madras Corporation flag had the 'sea, boat, 3 lions and 2 fish'. The 3 lions represented the British and the sea, boat, and fish denoted the seashore of madras. After Independence, the need for changing the flag arose. M.P. Sivagnanam (Ma. Po. Si.) who was heading the education wing of the corporation suggested the Pandiya, Chola, Chera's symbol 'Fish, Tiger and Bow' (which he already had in his 'Tamil arasu kazhagam's flag). Rajaji agreed with his suggestion.

== Budget ==
As of 2020, the city government's budget is ₹3,815 crore (US$410 million), out of which ₹1,900 crore (US$200 million) was earmarked for capital expenditure, ₹120 crore (US$13 million) is to be spent on the smart city project and a massive ₹1,275 crore (US$140 million) on laying bus routes, construction of new bridges and other methods of improve the transport infrastructure of the city.

== Location and demography ==
Chennai Corporation area is located on the Coromandel Coast in the central eastern coastal region of the Deccan Plateau and the northern end of the state of Tamil Nadu. The city stretches along the coast covering about 43 km of sandy beach and extending about 19 km inland, encompassing an area of 426 sq km. The estimated population is about 7.1 million as of 2014.

== Functions ==
The corporation maintains roads, streetlights, and flyovers across the city and also the city's cleanliness and hygiene levels. It maintains 1,160 roads measuring a total of 370 km and storm water drain measuring 962 km and has 213,045 streetlights. Power consumption by the streetlights amounts to 50 megawatts a day, costing ₹ 14,00,000. The corporation has 260 parks and maintains 113 community halls for public use. The corporation registers about 400 births and 180 deaths every day. The corporation also runs an abattoir. There are 23,538 staffs working in the corporation. In 2011–2012, ₹ 190 million was allotted by the Tamil Nadu government for the development of the city areas within corporation limits. In 2014, the Tamil Nadu Generation and Distribution Corporation (Tangedco) planned to change its 11-kilo volt transformers with 1,784 ring main units (RMUs) that are compact and safe.

=== Roads ===
The corporation maintains a total of 1,160 macadamised bus routes running to a total length of 353.94 km. The Total length of interior roads measures about 5,563.06 km. Total length of cement concrete roads maintained by the Corporation in the bus routes measures 3.68 km and the length of cement concrete interior roads measures 1,292.54 km.

The newly expanded region of the corporation alone has 2,752 km of roads, along which there is a 682.4 km network of storm water drains.

Street lamps in the city were introduced in 1785. Until the introduction of electric street lighting, the street lighting was done by oil lights. Till 1857, there were only 200 oil light lamps. By the year 1910, this was increased to 6,500. In 1910, electric street lighting was introduced. By 1924–1925, all the oil lights in the streets of the city were completely replaced by electric lights. The corporation also maintains 264 high-mast lights and 133 8-meter and 12-meter lamp posts with cluster lights at important junctions. The Corporation owns 22 hydraulic vehicles for attending maintenance work to streetlights. In 2012, the Corporation started installing 60,000 streetlights in the newly included zones, in addition to replacing about 88,000 old streetlights in these zones. Per the norm of the corporation, the minimum distance between two adjacent streetlights is 25 metre.

As on 2012, the corporation maintains 262 bridges, road-overbridges and road-underbridges, including 65 high-level bridges, 31 box culverts, 81 slab culverts, 11 rail-overbridges, 14 rail-underbridges, 6 pedestrian subways, 6 causeways, 35 footbridges and 13 grade separators.

In 2013, the corporation acquired a Road Measurement Data Acquisition System (ROMDAS) to check the quality of newly laid roads.

=== Parks and open green spaces ===
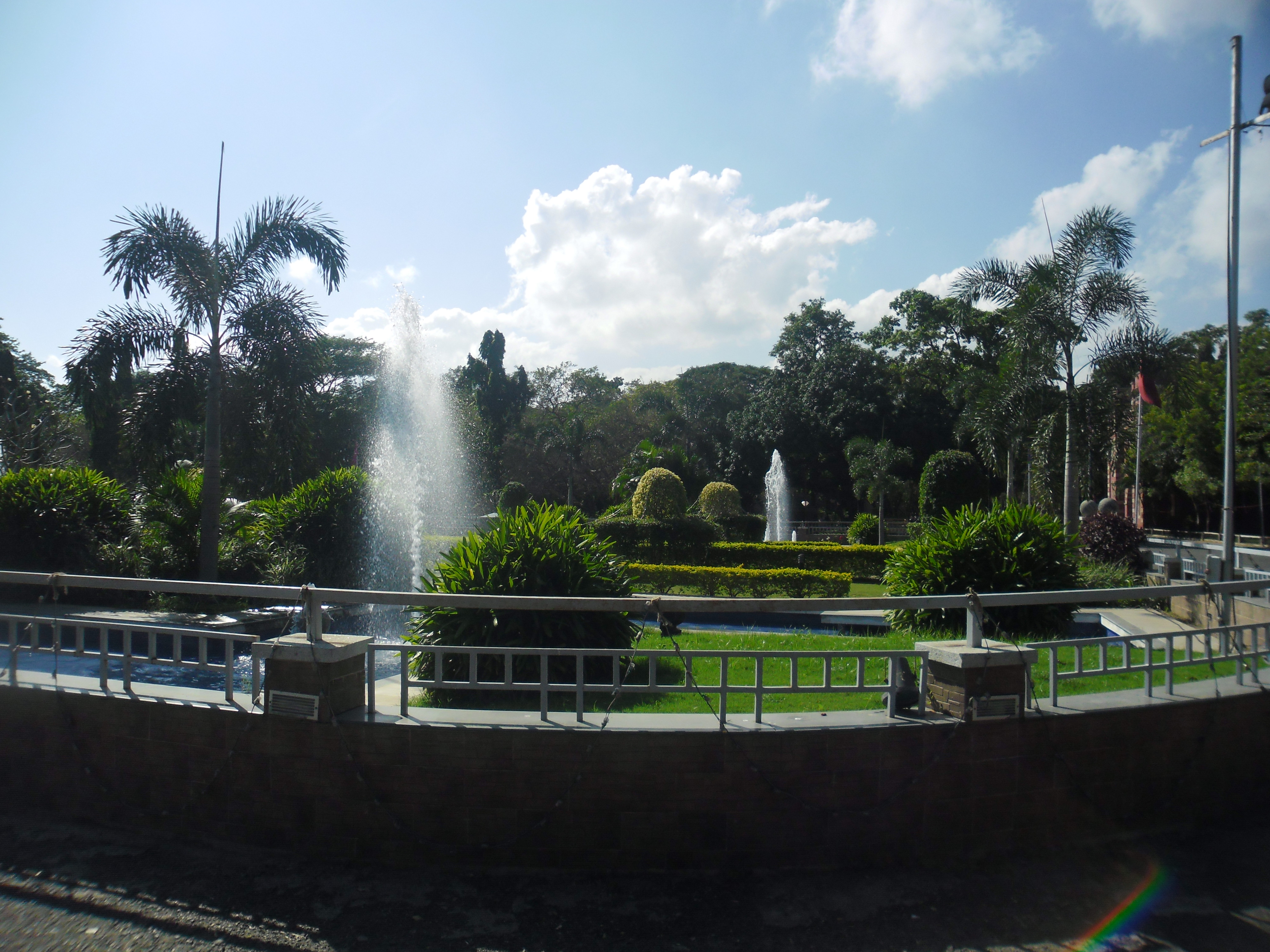
Anna Park maintained by Anna University

Chennai has one of the lowest per capita green space in the country. As of 2012, It has only about 0.46 square metres per city dweller. According to the development rules, when plots measuring more than 10,000 square metres are developed, 10% of the area must be reserved as open space and gifted to the local bodies, and in plots measuring between 3,000 and 10,000 square metres, if gifting of 10% of the area as open space is not possible, cash equivalent can be paid. The money thus collected is utilized to develop the landscaping in the city.

Since 1976, the Chennai Corporation has been collecting OSR charges and taking possession of land under the open space reservation rules. But so far it has not revealed what the total amount of land and cash collected. Data shows that since 2002, about 1.85 million square feet of land has been acquired.

The corporation maintains 260 public parks, 154 traffic islands, and 103 centre medians on major roads. Since the formation of the corporation until 1947, the corporation had maintained 18 public play fields. As of 2012, the corporation maintains 228 play fields, 234 gymnasiums, 4 shuttles indoor stadium, 1 basketball indoor stadium, and 2 swimming pools. Of the 228 play fields, about 14 have been designated as star play ground with facilities such as courts for football, tennis, volleyball, ball badminton, and basketball. The gymnasiums are used by about 50 to 100 people every day. Indoor shuttle courts are located in Mandaiveli, R. R. Colony in Jafferkhanpet, Karpagam Avenue in Mylapore, and Nungambakkam. A basketball indoor stadium is located in Kilpauk Gardens. Swimming pools are located in Marina Beach and My Lady's Park. Skating rinks are located in Anna Nagar, Shenoy Nagar, Nungambakkam, Marina Beach, K. K. Nagar and T. Nagar. The corporation also maintains beaches within the city.

There are about 13,787 lights installed and maintained in the park and play fields by the corporation.

=== Education ===
There are 322 schools run by the corporation, with a total student count of 130,000. As per 2012–2013 corporation budget, 30 new English medium primary and middle schools will be started. The civic body has also planned to construct 64 additional buildings on existing school campuses that require more classrooms. In addition, libraries and a career guidance centre would be set up in all corporation high and higher secondary schools.

=== Health ===
The corporation maintains 75 dispensaries, 36 malaria clinics, 42 tuberculosis microscopic centres, and 1 centre each for communicable diseases, NGO-run malaria clinic, filaria clinic, and filaria lymphodema management clinic. The corporation maintains three slaughterhouses in Perambur, Villivakkam, and Saidapet, where an average of 1,500 sheep and 150 cattle are slaughtered every day. As per 2012–2013 corporation budget, 11 new dental clinics will be set up in addition to the existing ones to ensure that every zone has a clinic. A new hospital will be set up with a specialised leprosy centre and Mandambakkam to benefit the residents of South Chennai. In 2007, it was reported that mosquitoes were the biggest menace in the city. In 2012, the corporation announced that it was planning to breed sterile male mosquitoes to bring down the population of female mosquitoes.

The corporation maintains electric furnace units at the burial grounds at Villivakkam, Nungambakkam, GKM colony, and Arumbakkam. It also maintains gassifier furnace units at Moolakothalam, Kannammapet, Besant Nagar Mylapore, Kasimedu, Vyasarpadi, Otteri, Thangal, Velangadu, Krishnampet, Saidapet, and Besant Nagar burial grounds.

=== Solid waste management ===
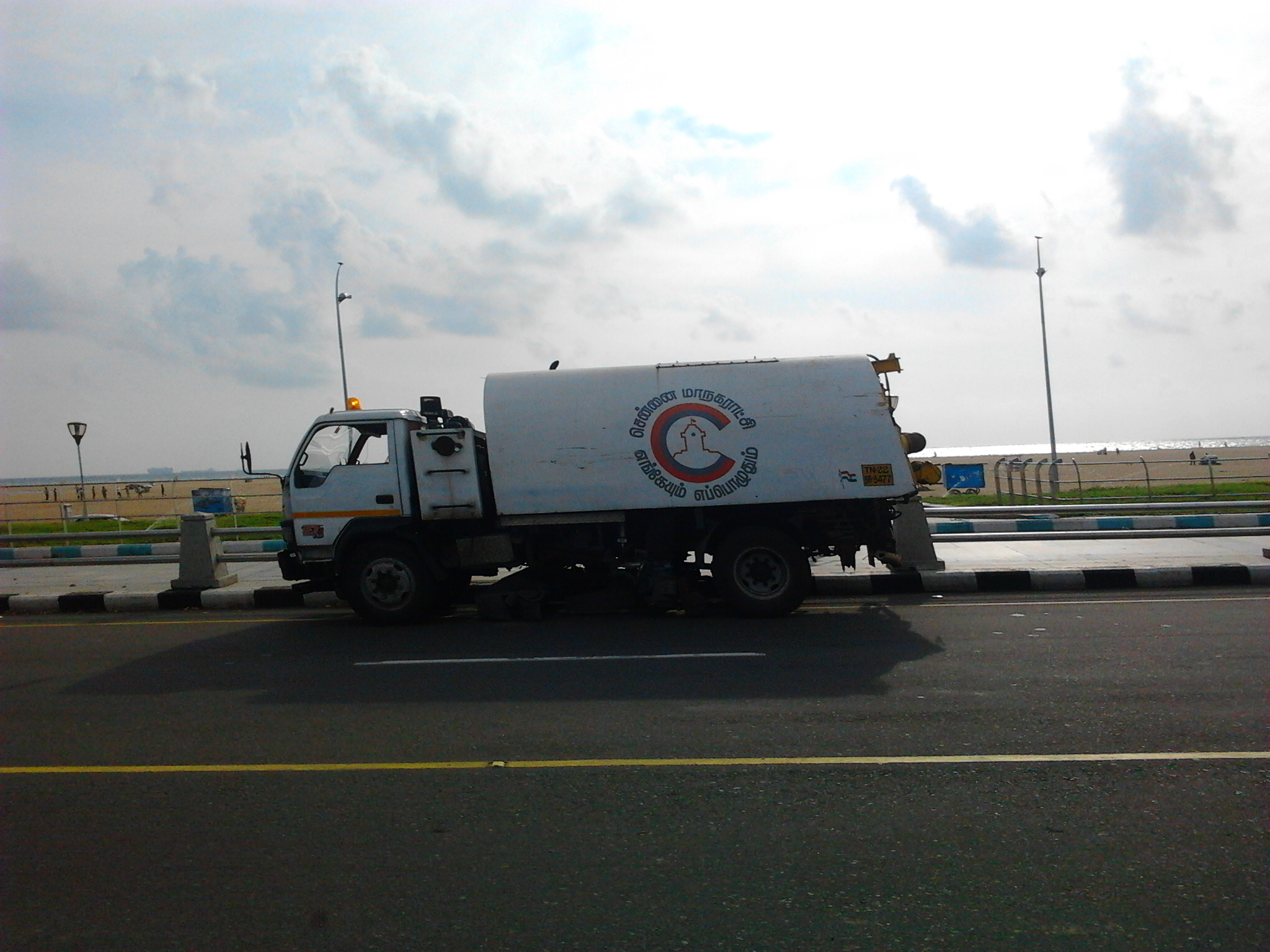
Chennai Corporation mechanical sweeper in action at the Beach Road

Headed by a Superintendent Engineer, the corporation is responsible for removal of solid waste within city limits. Every day, 4,500 metric tons of garbage is collected and removed from the city. Night conservancy is being carried out in all important roads and commercial areas of the city. In addition, door-to-door collection of garbage is followed in all zones in the city. The waste is transported by 966 conservancy vehicles. The corporation maintains dumping grounds at Kodungaiyur and Perungudi for dumping solid waste.

Chennai is hit by shortage of sanitary workers. To counter this, the corporation is to appoint 4,000 sanitary inspectors, junior engineers and assistant executive engineers in 2012.

Garbage in most zones was previously handled by JBM Fanalca Environment Management, a private company, and by the Chennai Corporation in the other zones. Solid waste management in several parts of the city was subsequently handed over to Chennai Municipal Solid Waste Pvt. Ltd a special purpose vehicle run by the Hyderabad-based Ramky Group for a period of seven years starting January 2012; elsewhere, Ramky Enviro Engineers Limited is described as a private company. The company is reportedly running at a loss and the corporation was alleged to have paid only ₹ 32.5 million of the ₹ 65 million bill. The company handles the three zones of Kodambakkam, Teynampet, and Adyar, also runs a toll-free telephone number to answer queries relating to waste management. The company also performed street plays to spread awareness on keeping the city clean. The Corporation later decided to take penal action against the private agency for not keeping up its end of the deal. In September, a show cause notice for termination of the contract was served, which was further upheld by the Madras High Court.

In other zones, the Corporation looks after the removal and processing of solid waste in the others, with a superintendent engineer managing the channels. As of 2011, 8 transfer stations exist within the city for treating the waste. Garbage is dumped in two dump-yards in the city—One in Kodungaiyur and another in Perungudi, with a major portion of the latter covering the Pallikaranai marshland. In market areas, the conservancy work is done during the night. Water supply and sewage treatment are handled by the Metropolitan Water Supply and Sewage Board, popularly referred to as Metro Water. Electricity is supplied by the Tamil Nadu Electricity Board. Fire services are handled by the Tamil Nadu Fire and Rescue Service. The city, along with the suburbs, has 33 operating fire stations.

=== Police ===
The Greater Chennai Police department, a division of the Tamil Nadu Police, is the law enforcement agency in the city. The city police force is headed by a commissioner of police, and administrative control rests with the Tamil Nadu Home Ministry. The department consists of 36 subdivisions with a total of 121 police stations, of which 15 are ISO 9001:2000 certified. The city's traffic is managed by the Chennai City Traffic Police (CCTP). The Metropolitan suburbs are policed by the Chennai Metropolitan Police, and outer district areas are policed by the Kanchipuram and Thiruvallur police departments.

=== Telecommunication ===
The city's telephone service is provided by three landline companies: Bharat Sanchar Nigam Limited (BSNL), Reliance Jio and Bharti Airtel. There are four mobile phone companies: BSNL, Vodafone Idea, Bharti Airtel and Reliance Jio, which offers GSM services. Broadband Internet access is provided by BSNL, Hathway, Bharti Airtel, You Broadband, Reliance Jio and ACT Broadband.

=== Waste management ===
The city generates 4,500 tonnes of garbage every day. The city has three dumpyards, one each at Perungudi, Kodungaiyur, and Pallikaranai. The corporation has planned to close these yards and create four new dumpyards at Malaipattu, Minjur, Vallur, and Kuthambakkam villages, ranging in size from 20 acres to 100 acres. According to studies by the civic body, green waste and wood account for 39 percent of the city's garbage and food waste around 8 percent. The civic body also spends ₹4 billion (US$43 million) a year on solid waste management. The corporation is planning to create a 200-acre park at the 269-acre Kodungaiyur dump yard and a 150-acre park at the 200-acre Perungudi dumpsite.

=== Water ===
Historically, Chennai has relied on annual monsoon rains to replenish water reservoirs, as no major rivers flow through the area. Steadily growing in population, the city has faced water supply shortages, and its ground water levels have been depleted. Many residents buy water for drinking as well as other daily uses. An earlier Veeranam Lake project failed to solve the city's water problems, but the New Veeranam project, which became operational in September 2004, has greatly reduced dependency on distant sources. In recent years, heavy and consistent monsoon rains and rainwater harvesting (RWH) by Chennai Metrowater at its Anna Nagar Rain Centre have significantly reduced water shortages. The Metrowater methods have become a model of RWH technology for other cities. Moreover, newer projects like the Telugu Ganga project that bring water from water-surplus rivers like the Krishna River in Andhra Pradesh have eased water shortages. The city is constructing sea water desalination plants to further increase the water supply.

The city's water supply and sewage treatment are managed by the Chennai MetroWater Supply and Sewage Board. Water is drawn from Red Hills Lake and Chembarambakkam Lake, the primary water reservoirs of the city, and treated at water treatment plants located at Kilpauk, Puzhal, Chembarambakkam and supplied to the city through 27 water distribution stations. The city receives 530 million litres per day (MLD) of water from Krishna River through Telugu Ganga project, 180 MLD of water from the Veeranam lake project and 100 MLD of water from the Minjur desalination plant, the country's largest sea water desalination plant. However, Chennai is predicted to face a huge deficit of 713 MLD in 2026 as the demand is projected at 2,248 MLD and supply estimated at only 1,535 MLD. There are 714 public toilets in the city managed by the city corporation, and 2,000 more has been planned by the corporation. The corporation also owns 52 community halls across the city.

== Awards ==
In December 2014, the Confederation of Indian Industry (CII) adjudged the Chennai Corporation as the best among all the government departments in terms of e-governance.

== Gallery ==
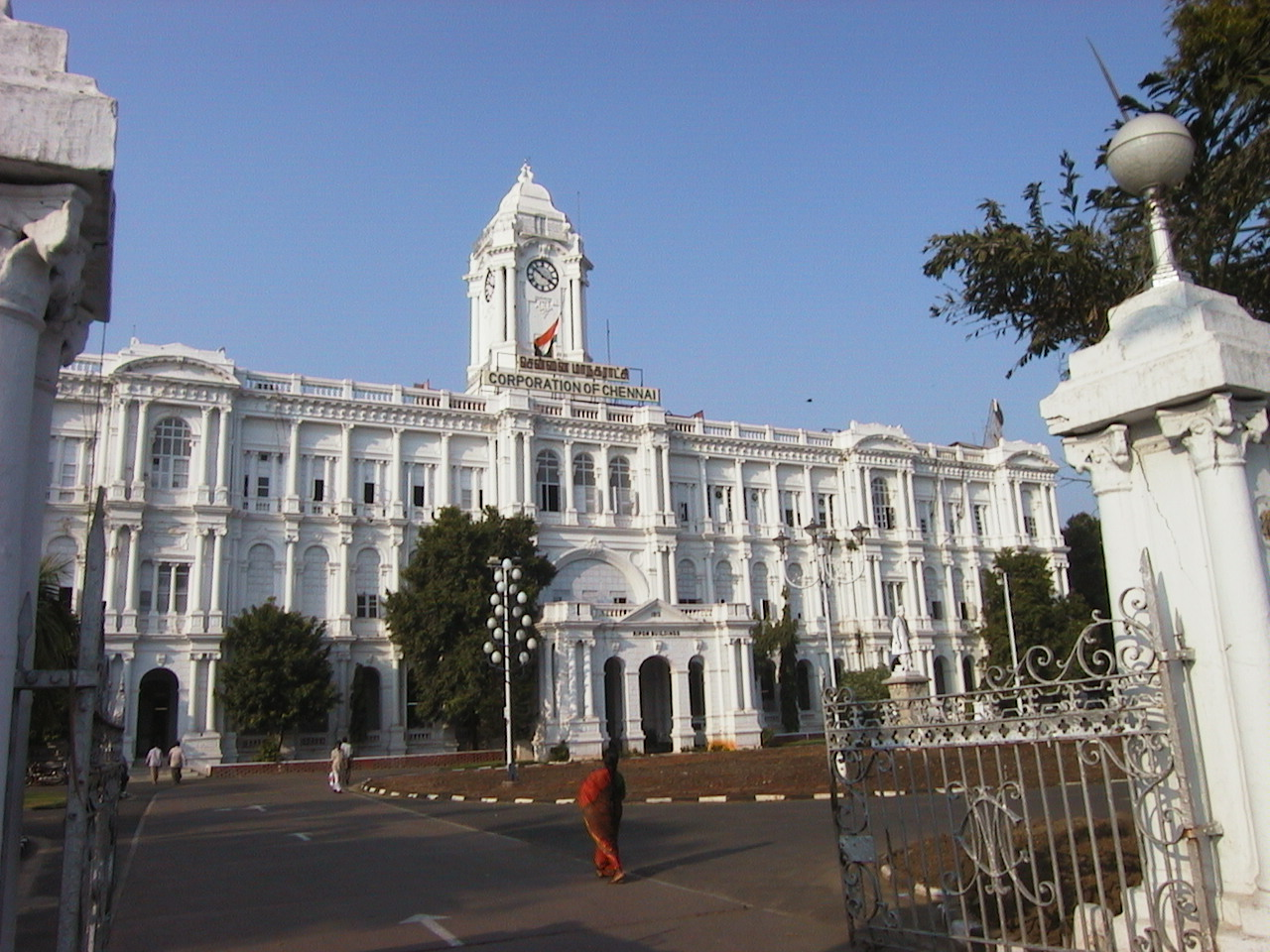
Entrance view

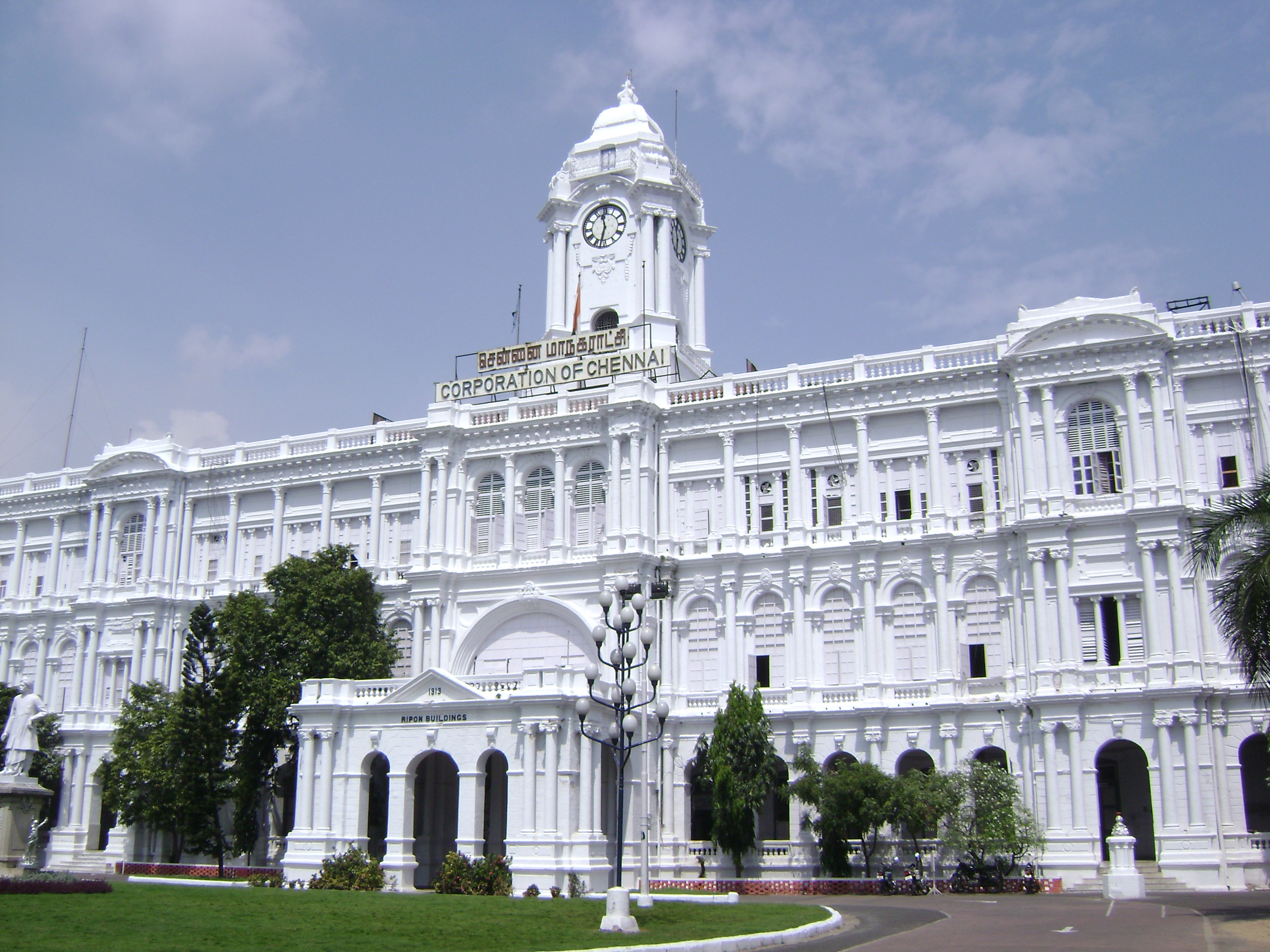
Alternate view

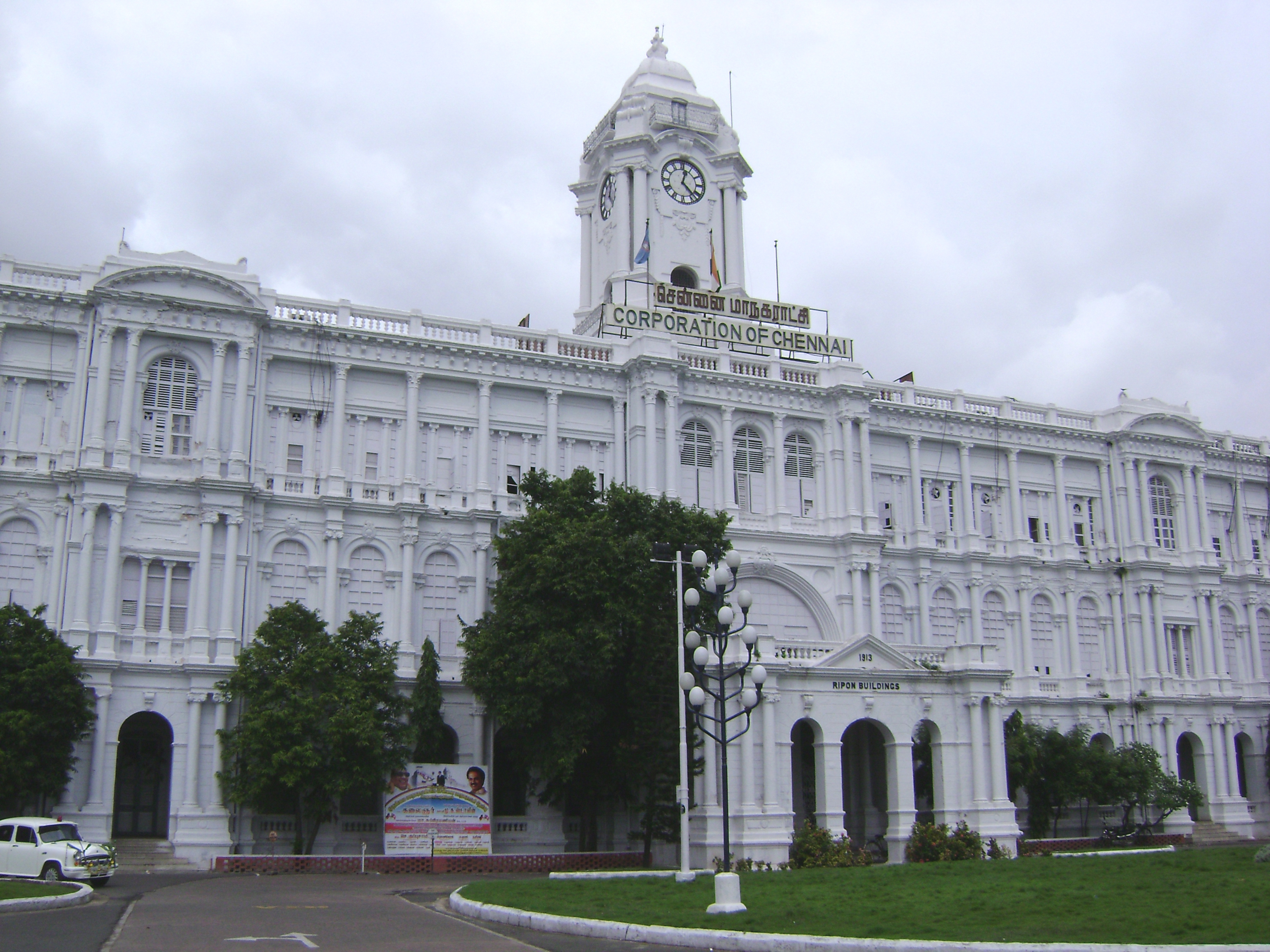
Ripon Building under the Dark Clouds

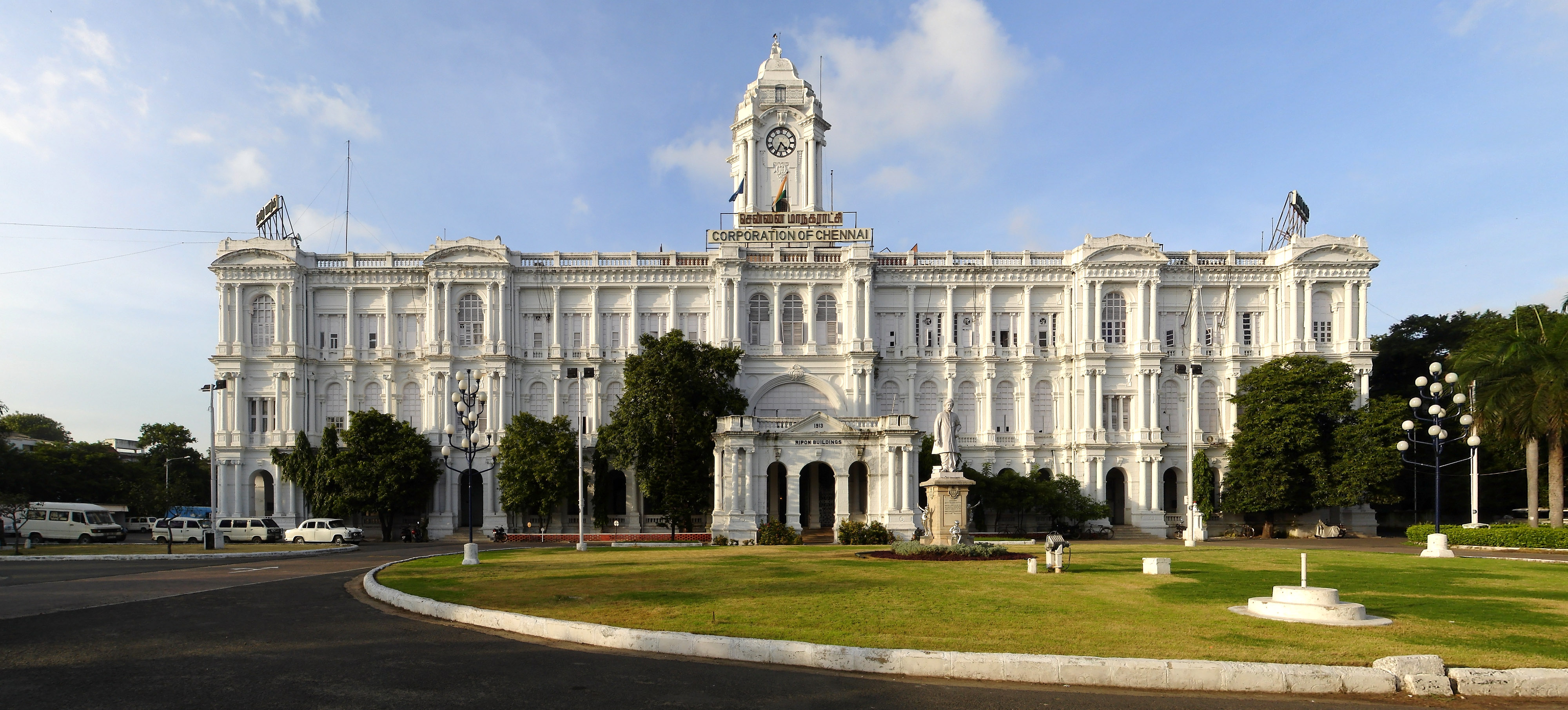
Complete front façade of the building

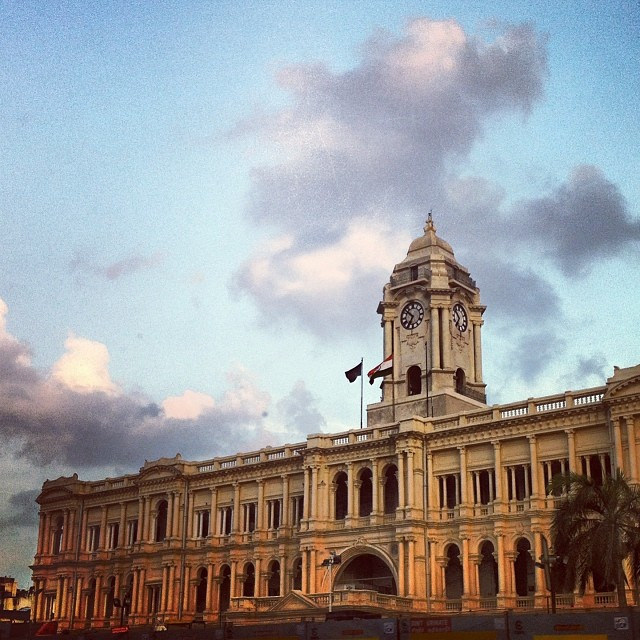
Ripon Building at 1990

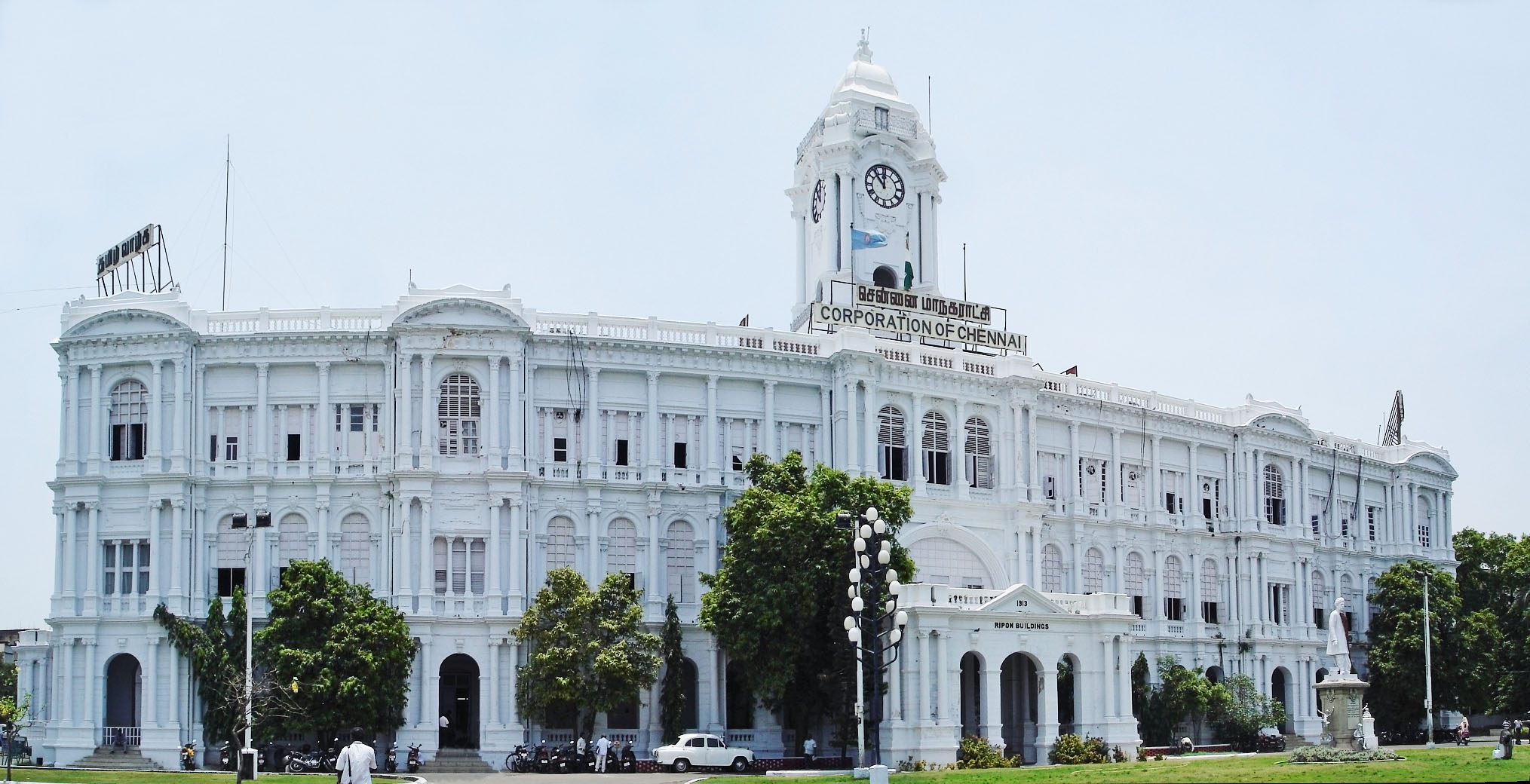
Ripon Building panoramic view

== See also ==
- Chennai
- List of Chennai Corporation wards
- List of mayors of Chennai
- Tambaram Corporation
