= Madhavaram, Chennai =

Madhavaram
- Neighbourhood
- Madhavaram (Chennai) Madhavaram (Tamil Nadu) Madhavaram (India)
- Coordinates: 13.148800°N 80.230600°E
- Country: India
- State: Tamil Nadu
- District: Chennai District
- Taluk: Madhavaram
- Metro: Chennai
- Chennai Corporation Zone: III
- Division: Tondiarpet
- Elevation: 34 m (112 ft)

Population (2011)
  - Total: 119,105

Languages
  - Official: Tamil
- Time zone: UTC+5:30 (IST)
- PIN: 600060
- Vehicle registration: TN-18
- Parliamentary constituency: Tiruvallur
- MP: Sasikanth Senthil, INC
- MLA: M. L. Vijay Prabhu
- Assembly constituency: Madhavaram
- Planning agency: CMDA

Madhavaram is a neighbourhood of Chennai, Tamil Nadu, India. Located in the northern part of Chennai, it is also a taluk in Chennai District and a zone in Greater Chennai Corporation. It is located in between Perambur and Kodungaiyur. As of 2011, the neighbourhood had a population of 119,105. The Chennai district was expanded on 16 August 2018 by transferring Madhavaram taluk from Tiruvallur district to Chennai district.

== History ==
The Madhavaram taluk was formed on 1 July 2009 when the large Ambattur taluk was split into two. The latter was considered the largest land area in Chennai, which consisted of five fircas (towns). The new Madhavaram taluk consists of two fircas (Madhavaram and Red Hills) and 36 villages.

== Geography ==
Madhavaram is located at 13.15°N 80.24°E. It has an average elevation of 13 metres (42 feet).

== Demographics ==
Religious census
Religion	Percent(%)
[Hindu	82.73%
Muslim	4.08%
Christian	12.48%
Sikh	0.05%
Buddhist	0.04%
Jain	0.16%
Other	0.46%
No religion	0.01%

According to 2011 census, Madhavaram had a population of 119,105 with a sex-ratio of 989 females for every 1,000 males, much above the national average of 929. A total of 13,030 were under the age of six, constituting 6,703 males and 6,327 females. Scheduled Castes and Scheduled Tribes accounted for 12.4% and 0.28% of the population respectively. The average literacy of the town was 80.61%, compared to the national average of 72.99%. The town had a total of 29,792 households. There were a total of 43,385 workers, comprising 148 cultivators, 233 main agricultural labourers, 765 in house hold industries, 36,871 other workers, 5,368 marginal workers, 89 marginal cultivators, 65 marginal agricultural labourers, 283 marginal workers in household industries and 4,931 other marginal workers. During 2001–2011, Madhavaram registered a population growth of 56% with a 2011 population of 118,525.

=== Religion ===
As per the religious census of 2011, Madhavaram (M) had 82.73% Hindus, 4.08% Muslims, 12.48% Christians, 0.05% Sikhs, 0.04% Buddhists, 0.16% Jains, 0.46% following other religions and 0.01% following no religion or did not indicate any religious preference.

There is a Shivan temple in Madhavaram which is believed to be 1,300 years old. There is also a Vishnu Temple.

St. Sebastian Church was established in 1942. The Salesians ran the parish before ceding administration to the Franciscans in 1953. The annual feast takes place during Easter week and draws crowds in the thousands. The three communities of Catholic religious sisters in the area are the Society of Sisters of St. Ann Luzern, who administer St. Anthony's Hospital and St. Anne's Higher Secondary School; the Society of Sisters of St. Anne - Madras, on whose premises stands what is colloquially known as Round Chapel; and the Sisters of Maria Auxiliatrix.

Other churches in the area include CSI Arul Church, Assemblies of God Church (established in 1994 by Pastor K. Maniraj), the Apostolic Church, and ACA Church.

Masjid-E-Shariff is the local mosque.

== Schools ==
- Acharya Mahashraman Terapanth Jain Public School
- Bosco Academy Matriculation School
- Olive Tree Global School
- Sri Chaitanya Techno School
- Sri Sakthi Matriculation Higher Secondary School
- St. Ann's Matriculation Higher Secondary School (Thapalpetti)
- St. Joseph's Academy Matriculation Higher Secondary School
- Velammal New-Gen School

== Colleges ==
- Jayagovind Harigopal Agarwal Agarsen College

== Universities ==
- Tamil Nadu Veterinary and Animal Sciences University
- Tamil Nadu Dr. J. Jayalalithaa Fisheries University, Madhavaram Campus
- Tamil Nadu Agricultural University, Madhavaram Campus

== Administration and politics ==
Madhavaram is a newly formed state legislative constituency with more than 200,000 (2 lakh) voters. It consists of areas like Madhavaram, Mathur MMDA, Manali, Milk Colony, Puzhal, Red Hills, Sholavaram and Vadakarai. Madhavaram belongs to Chennai's corporation zone lll. Presently, Mr.M.L.VIjay Prabhu from TVK is the Member of Legislative Assembly.

== Transportation ==
Madhavaram Mofussil Bus Terminus, one of the satellite termini of Chennai, is located in the neighbourhood, chiefly handling buses to Trichy Andhra Pradesh and Telangana, including cities such as Chittoor, Tirupati, Nellore, Vijayawada, Kurnool, Puttaparthi, Visakhapatnam, Bhadrachalam, and Hyderabad.

Metropolitan Transport Corporation (MTC) runs passenger buses to Madhavaram from other major parts of Chennai like Mint, Broadway, Ambattur Estate, Koyambedu, Redhills etc. A bus terminus serves the residents. Share Autos play an important role in transportation.

=== MTC Routes ===
Some of the routes originating or passing by Madhavaram New Bus Terminal

Ordinary	Express	Deluxe

MTC Routes
Route	Origin	Destination	Via	Status	Fare
38H	Madhavaram	Broadway	Thapal Petti, Moolakadai, Sharma Nagar, Ambedkar College Vyasarpadi, MKB Nagar East, Vallalar Nagar, Stanley Hospital, Bharathi Arts College, Thambu Chetty St., Beach Station, Parrys Corner	Frequent	Ordinary
38Hct	Madhavaram	Vallalar Nagar	Thapal Petti, Moolakadai, Sharma Nagar, Ambedkar College Vyasarpadi, MKB Nagar East	Cut service	Ordinary
48A	Madhavaram	Ambattur IE	Thapal Petti, Moolakadai, Simpson Chembium, BB Road, Perambur R.S., Jamalya, Podi Kadai, Sayani, Joint Office, ICF, Villivakkam Kalpana, Padi Lucas, Brittania	Less Frequent	Ordinary
48Aet	JJ Nagar West	Madhavaram	Mogappair Road Junction, Ambattur IE, Brittania, Padi Lucas, Villivakkam Kalpana, ICF, Joint Office, Sayani, Podi Kadai, Jamalya, Perambur R.S., Perambur Market, Simpsons Chembium, Moolakadai, Thapal Petti	Less Frequent	Ordinary
38G	Broadway	Vazhuthigaimedu	Beach Station, Thambu Chetty St., Bharathi Arts College, Stanley Hospital, Vallalar Nagar, Ambedkar College Vyasarpadi, Sharma Nagar, Thapal petti, Madhavaram New B.S., Manjampakkam, Vilangadupakkam, Arumandai Road Junction, Periyamullaivoyal	1 bus running per day	Ordinary
38Gct	Broadway	Padiyanallur	Beach Station, Stanley, Vallalar Nagar, Vyasarpadi, Sharma Nagar, Moolakadai, Thapal Petti, Madhavaram, Vilangadupakkam, Vadakarai, Redhills BS	Cut service	Ordinary
121Met	Manali	MGR CMBT	Manali Market, Periya Mathur, Manjampakkam, Madhavaram, Thapal Petti, Moolakadai, Madhavaram MBT, Retteri Junction, Wheels India, Anna Nagar West, Thirumanagalam, CPWD Towers	1 bus running per day	Ordinary
121Mx	MGR CMBT	Vazhuthigaimedu	CPWD Towers, Thirumangalam, Wheels India, Retteri Junction, MMBT, Moolakadai, Madhavaram, Manjambakkam, Vilangadupakkam, Arumandai Road Junction, Periyamullaivoyal	1 bus per day	Ordinary
S64	Assisi Nagar	Perambur	Telephone Exchange, Madhavaram PUO, Leather Factory, Moolakadai, Simpsons Chembium, Perambur Market, BB Road	Frequent	Express
121F	Madhavaram	Tambaram	Thapal Petti, Mooolakadai, MMBT, Retteri Junction, Wheels India, Thirumangalam, CMBT, Vadapalani, Ekkatuthangal, Guindy IE, Airport, Pallavaram BS, Chromepet, Tamabaram MEPZ	Frequent	Deluxe
121M	Madhavaram	MGR CMBT	Thapal Petti, Moolakadai, MMBT, Retteri Junction, Wheels India, Thirumangalam, CPWD Towers	Frequent	Deluxe
104F	Madhavaram	Kilambakkam KCBT	Thapal Petti, Moolakadai, MMBT, Retteri Juunction, Padi Lucas, Ambattur IE, Maduravoyal, Porur TollPlaza, Perungalathur, Vandalooe	Frequent	Deluxe
70F	Madhavaram	Kilambakkam KCBT	Moolakkadai, MMBT, Retteri Junction, Wheels India, Thirumangalam, CMBT, Vadapalani, Guindy IE, St.Thomas Mount, Airport, Chromepet, Tambaram, Perungalathur, Vandaloot	Frequent	Deluxe

=== Truck Terminal ===
In the interest of the economy and trade and to decongest the central business district, CMDA has developed the truck terminal at Madhavaram over an extent about 100 acres (0.40 km^{2}) at the cost of about ₹ 60 million (6 crores). It is located near the junction of 100 Feet Road and the GNT Road, with easy access to Chennai city, port and railways. The terminal has been functioning since 1992. The objective of the project is to provide modern and functionally efficient truck terminals for the benefit of the city.

== Botanical garden ==
A botanical garden development broke ground on a 28-acre site in September 2010. The project was expected to complete in February 2013, at a cost of ₹57.3 million. The facility has almost 400 species of plants and also a herbal garden along with a nursery. A glasshouse, fountains, a birds' sanctuary, an auditorium and a children's play area are other facilities of the garden.

The Horticulture Training Centre in Madhavaram was also to be upgraded to Horticulture Management Institute, at a cost of ₹39 million.
