= Chennai Metropolitan Development Authority =

State agency of Tamil Nadu, India

Coordinates: 13.07790°N 80.26489°E

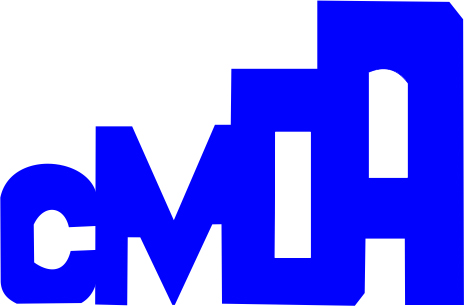
- CMDA Logo

Agency overview
- Formed: 1974
- Type: Urban Planning Agency
- Jurisdiction: Government of Tamil Nadu
- Headquarters: Egmore, Chennai, Tamil Nadu
- Motto: Better Chennai is Our Motto
- Minister responsible: P.K.Sekar Babu, Minister for CMDA
- Parent agency: Municipal Administration and Urban Development
- Website: www.cmdachennai.gov.in

The Chennai Metropolitan Development Authority (CMDA) is the urban planning agency of Chennai in the Indian state of Tamil Nadu. The CMDA administers the Chennai Metropolitan Region, spread over an area of 5,904 km^{2} (2,280 sq mi) and covers the districts of Chennai, Thiruvallur, Chengalpattu, Ranipet and Kancheepuram. It was set up for the purposes of planning, co-ordination, supervising, promoting and securing the planned development of the Chennai Metropolitan Area. It coordinates the development activities of the municipal corporations, municipalities and other local authorities.

== History ==
The CMDA was constituted as an ad hoc body in 1972 under the Tamil Nadu Town and Country Planning Act 1971. It was formed as the nodal Town planning authority for the city of Madras (now Chennai) and its suburbs and became a statutory body in 1974. It is headed by minister for housing as its chairman.

In January 2013, CMDA was recognised as a research centre by the Centre for Research, Anna University.

== Jurisdiction ==
The CMA falls in five Districts of the Tamil Nadu State viz. Chennai District, Tiruvallur District (except Pallipattu, RK Pet & parts of Tiruttani Taluks), Kancheepuram District (except Uthiramerur Taluk), Chengalpattu District (except Madurantakam & Cheyyur Taluks) & Ranipet District (parts of Arakkonam Taluk). New construction in areas under the CMDA needs their approval to start work.

In Chennai district

1. Alandur
2. Ambattur
3. Aminjikarai
4. Ayanavaram
5. Egmore
6. Guindy
7. Madhavaram
8. Maduravoyal
9. Mambalam
10. Mylapore
11. Perambur
12. Purasawalkam
13. Sholinganallur
14. Thiruvottiyur
15. Tondiarpet
16. Velachery

In Chengalpattu district

1. Pallavaram
2. Tambaram
3. Vandalur
4. Chengalpattu
5. Thiruporur
6. Tirukalukundram

In Kanchipuram district

1. Kundrathur
2. Sriperumbudur
3. Kanchipuram
4. Walajabad

In Tiruvallur district

1. Avadi
2. Poonamallee
3. Ponneri
4. Gummidipoondi
5. Uthukottai
6. Tiruvallur
7. Tiruttani (partial)

In Ranipet district

1. Arakkonam (partial)

== Projects ==
Some of the notable projects undertaken by the CMDA include:

- Chennai Mofussil bus terminus, Koyambedu
- Wholesale vegetable market, Koyambedu
- Chennai Mass Rapid Transit System
- Outer Ring Road
- Madhavaram Mofussil Bus Terminus, Madhavaram
- Kilambakkam Mofussil Bus Terminus, Kilambakkam
- Kuthambakkam Mofussil Bus Terminus, Kuthambakkam
- Ambattur Industrial Estate Bus Terminus, Ambattur Industrial Estate
- Thiru. Vi. Ka Nagar Bus Terminus, Thiru. Vi. Ka Nagar
- Periyar Nagar Bus Terminus, Periyar Nagar, Kolathur
- M. K. B Nagar Bus Terminus, M. K. B Nagar, Vyasarpadi
- Kaviyarasu Kannadasan Nagar Bus Terminus, KKD Nagar, Kodungaiyur
- Ennore Bus Terminus, Ennore
