= Ambattur division =

Ambattur division is a revenue division in the Chennai district of Tamil Nadu, India. It comprises the taluks of Ambattur, Aminjikarai, Ayanavaram, Egmore, Kolathur, Maduravoyal and Mambalam.
