= Egmore (disambiguation) =

Egmore is a neighbourhood located in the north west part of Chennai, Tamil Nadu, India.

Egmore may also refer to these related to the Chennai neighbourhood:

- Egmore (state assembly constituency)
- Egmore taluk, a subdistrict of Chennai
- Egmore clique, a political faction in the Madras Presidency of British India; opposed to the Mylapore clique
- Egmore court complex
- Egmore metro station, on Line 2 of the Chennai Metro
- Chennai Egmore railway station
- Egmore Museum
- Egmore Eye Hospital
