= Kolathur taluk =

Taluk of Chennai district in Tamil Nadu, India

- Taluk
- Interactive map of Kolathur taluk
- Coordinates: 13.1240°N 80.2121°E
- Country: India
- State: Tamil Nadu
- District: Chennai

Area
  - Total: 6.24 km^{2} (2.41 sq mi)

Population
  - Total: 3.78 lakh

Languages
  - Official: Tamil, English
  - Speech: Tamil, English
- Time zone: UTC+5:30 (IST)
- Telephone code: +9144********
- Vehicle registration: TN 05 ** xxxx
- Neighbourhoods: Kolathur, Peravallur, Thiru. Vi. Ka Nagar, Agaram, Jawahar Nagar, Periyar Nagar, Sembium, Siruvallur, Perambur
- Corporation: Greater Chennai Corporation
- District Collector: Rashmi Siddharth Zagade, I. A. S.
- LS: Chennai North
- VS: Kolathur
- MP: Kalanidhi Veeraswamy
- MLA: M. K. Stalin

Kolathur taluk is a new taluk in Chennai district of Tamil Nadu state in India.

== Details ==
This taluk was created by bifurcating Ayanavaram taluk into Ayanavaram and Kolathur taluks. With this addition, Chennai district now comprises 17 taluks.

Kolathur taluk covers an area of 6.24 km² and has an estimated population of approximately 3.78 lakh as of August 2024. Kolathur serves as its headquarters. This taluk falls under the Central Chennai Revenue Division and is part of the Kolathur Assembly constituency and the Chennai North Lok Sabha constituency.

The revenue villages of Kolathur, Peravallur, and Siruvallur are part of Kolathur taluk.
