= Sencheri =

- city
- Country: India
- State: Tamil Nadu
- District: Chennai

Languages
  - Official: Tamil
- Time zone: UTC+5:30 (IST)
- Vehicle registration: TN-

Sencheri is one of the neighbourhoods of the city of Chennai in Tamil Nadu, India. It is located in the northern part of the city and forms a part of Egmore-Nungambakkam taluk.
