= Morai, Chennai =

Village in Tamil Nadu, India

Morai
- Village
- Location within Chennai Location within Tamil Nadu Location within India
- Coordinates: 13°10′21″N 80°04′53″E
- Country: India
- State: Tamil Nadu
- District: Tiruvallur
- Tehsil: Ambattur

Government
  - Type: Gram Panchayat

Area
  - Total: 11.63 km^{2} (4.49 sq mi)
- Elevation: 27 m (89 ft)

Population (2011)
  - Total: 10,873
  - Density: 934.9/km^{2} (2,421/sq mi)

Languages
  - Official: Tamil
- Time zone: UTC+5:30 (IST)
- PIN: 600055
- Vehicle registration: TN-09

Morai is a village in Ambattur Taluk, Tiruvallur District, Tamil Nadu, India. It is located in the western suburb of Chennai, about 23 kilometres away from the city center. As of 2011, it had a total population of 10,873.

== Geography ==
Morai is located on the banks of Krishna Water Canal, covering an area of 11.63 square kilometres. Chennai Outer Ring Road passes through the village. Its average elevation is 27 metres above the sea level.

== Climate ==
Morai has a Tropical Savanna Climate (Aw). It sees the least amount of precipitation in February, with an average rainfall of 8 mm; and the most precipitation in October, with an average rainfall of 191 mm.

Climate data for Morai
Month	Jan	Feb	Mar	Apr	May	Jun	Jul	Aug	Sep	Oct	Nov	Dec	Year
Mean daily maximum °C (°F)	28.2 (82.8)	30.6 (87.1)	33.5 (92.3)	35.7 (96.3)	37.7 (99.9)	36.2 (97.2)	34.8 (94.6)	33.7 (92.7)	33.0 (91.4)	31.0 (87.8)	28.7 (83.7)	27.6 (81.7)	32.6 (90.6)
Daily mean °C (°F)	23.9 (75.0)	25.0 (77.0)	27.4 (81.3)	29.9 (85.8)	31.9 (89.4)	31.2 (88.2)	30.2 (86.4)	29.4 (84.9)	28.8 (83.8)	27.2 (81.0)	25.4 (77.7)	24.2 (75.6)	27.9 (82.2)
Mean daily minimum °C (°F)	19.8 (67.6)	20.1 (68.2)	22.4 (72.3)	25.8 (78.4)	27.9 (82.2)	27.6 (81.7)	26.8 (80.2)	26.1 (79.0)	25.6 (78.1)	24.2 (75.6)	22.7 (72.9)	21.1 (70.0)	24.2 (75.5)
Average rainfall mm (inches)	16 (0.6)	8 (0.3)	10 (0.4)	16 (0.6)	48 (1.9)	82 (3.2)	91 (3.6)	114 (4.5)	119 (4.7)	191 (7.5)	182 (7.2)	90 (3.5)	967 (38)
Source: Climate-Data.org

== Demographics ==
According to the 2011 Indian Census, there are 2,718 households in Morai. Among the 10,873 residents, 5,462 are male and 5,411 are female. The overall literacy rate is 73.96%, with 4,312 of the male population and 3,730 of the female population being literate. Its census location code is 629163.
