= Aminjikarai taluk =

Taluk of the city district of Chennai in the Indian state of Tamil Nadu

Coordinates: 13.0640101°N 80.2002898°E

Aminjikarai taluk is a taluk of the city district of Chennai in the Indian state of Tamil Nadu. It was formed in December 2013 from parts of the erstwhile Perambur-Purasawalkam taluk and the Egmore-Nungambakkam taluk. It comprises the neighbourhoods of Aminjikarai, Anna Nagar, Arumbakkam, Koyambedu, Thirumangalam, Vada Agaram and Villivakkam.

- Perambur-Purasawalkam taluk
1. Villivakkam Firka: Villivakkam, Mullam
- Egmore-Nungambakkam taluk
1. Aminjikarai Firka: Arumbakkam, Aminjikarai, Vada Agaram
2. Anna Nagar Firka: Chinnakudal, Naduvankarai, Periyakudal, Thirumangalam
3. Koyambedu Firka: Koyambedu, Sencheri
