= Maduravoyal Assembly constituency =

State Legislative Assembly constituency in Tamil Nadu

Coordinates: 13.0675°N 80.1632°E

Maduravoyal
- Constituency No. 7 for the Tamil Nadu Legislative Assembly
- Interactive map outlining Maduravoyal assembly constituency in Chennai district

Constituency details
- Country: India
- Region: South India
- State: Tamil Nadu
- District: Chennai
- Lok Sabha constituency: Sriperumbudur
- Established: 2008
- Total electors: 373,283
- Reservation: None

Member of Legislative Assembly
- 17th Tamil Nadu Legislative Assembly
- Incumbent P. Rhevanth Charan
- Party: TVK
- Elected year: 2026

Maduravoyal is a legislative assembly constituency in Chennai district in the Indian state of Tamil Nadu. Its State Assembly Constituency number is 7. It consists of a portion of Ambattur taluk and part of Chennai Corporation. It falls under Sriperumbudur Lok Sabha constituency. It is one of the 234 State Legislative Assembly Constituencies in Tamil Nadu, in India. Elections and winners from this constituency are listed below.

== Members of the Legislative Assembly ==
Election	Member	Party
2011	G. Beem Rao	Communist Party of India
2016	P. Benjamin	All India Anna Dravida Munnetra Kazhagam
2021	K. Ganapathy	Dravida Munnetra Kazhagam
2026	P. Rhevanth Charan	Tamilaga Vettri Kazhagam

== Election results ==
Vote share of winning candidates
2026	48.26%
2021	44.64%
2016	40.12%
2011	52.09%

=== 2026 ===
2026 Tamil Nadu Legislative Assembly election : Maduravoyal
Party	Candidate	Votes	%	±%
TVK	P. Rhevanth Charan	141,725	48.26	New
DMK	K. Ganapathy	80,216	27.31	▼17.33
AIADMK	P. Benjamin	54,705	18.63	New
NTK	Revathi. L	13,024	4.43	▼3.31
NOTA	None of the above	1,462	0.50	▼0.29
Margin of victory		61,509	20.94	▲9.27
Turnout		294,170	78.80	▲18.22
Total valid votes		293,692		
Registered electors		373,321		▼17.44
TVK gain from DMK		Swing	▲3.62	

=== 2021 ===
2021 Tamil Nadu Legislative Assembly election : Maduravoyal
Party	Candidate	Votes	%	±%
DMK	K. Ganapathy	121,298	44.64	New
AIADMK	P. Benjamin	89,577	32.97	▼7.15
MNM	S. Padma Priya	33,401	12.29	New
NTK	G. Ganeshkumar	21,045	7.74	▲5.25
AMMK	E. Lucky Murugan	2,660	0.98	New
NOTA	None of the above	2,146	0.79	▼1.89
Margin of victory		31,721	11.67	▲8.29
Turnout		273,951	60.58	▼1.26
Total valid votes		271,724		
Registered electors		452,195		▲12.43
DMK gain from AIADMK		Swing	▲4.52	

=== 2016 ===
2016 Tamil Nadu Legislative Assembly election : Maduravoyal
Party	Candidate	Votes	%	±%
AIADMK	P. Benjamin	99,739	40.12	New
INC	R. Rajesh	91,337	36.74	New
CPI(M)	G. Beem Rao	19,612	7.89	▼44.20
PMK	N. V. Srinivasan	17,328	6.97	▼32.20
NOTA	None of the above	6,655	2.68	New
NTK	M. Vasu	6,181	2.49	New
IJK	R. Anandapriya	4,582	1.84	▲0.63
Margin of victory		8,402	3.38	▼9.53
Turnout		248,719	61.84	▲61.84
Total valid votes		248,597		
Rejected ballots		122	0.05	
Registered electors		402,205		▲49.23
AIADMK gain from CPI(M)		Swing	▼11.97	

=== 2011 ===
2011 Tamil Nadu Legislative Assembly election : Maduravoyal
Party	Candidate	Votes	%	±%
CPI(M)	G. Beem Rao	96,844	52.09	New
PMK	K. Selvam	72,833	39.17	New
BJP	S. Selvan	6,381	3.43	New
IJK	D. Sivasankaran	2,256	1.21	New
BSP	P. Yosuva	2,040	1.10	New
Independent	K. Selvam	1,542	0.83	New
JMM	L. Dhilbahadur	1,373	0.74	New
Margin of victory		24,011	12.91	
Total valid votes		185,925		
Rejected ballots		36	0.00	
Registered electors		269,513		
CPI(M) win (new seat)				
