= Chennai district =

- District of Tamil Nadu
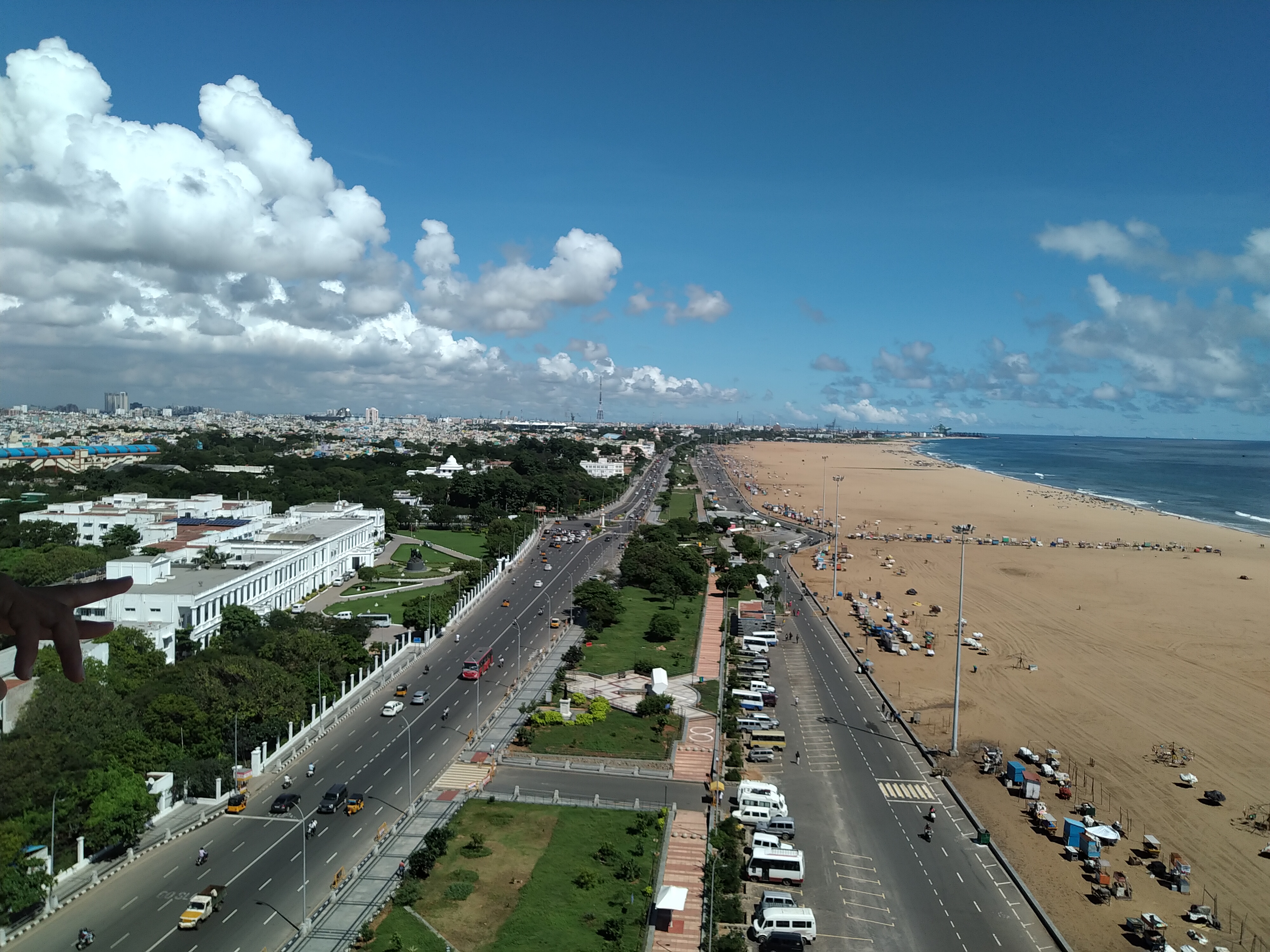
- View of Marina Beach
- Nicknames: Detroit of Asia; Healthcare Capital of India; City of Flyovers; Gateway of South India
- Location in Tamil Nadu
- Coordinates: 13°5′2″N 80°16′12″E
- Country: India
- State: Tamil Nadu
- Region: Tondai Nadu or Tondaimandalam
- Headquarters: Chennai
- Talukas: Alandur, Aminjikarai, Ambattur, Ayanavaram, Egmore, Guindy, Kolathur, Madhavaram, Manali, Maduravoyal, Mylapore, Mambalam, Purasawalkam, Perambur, Shollinganallur, Thiruvottiyur, Tondiarpet, Velachery

Government
  - District Collector: Rashmi Siddharth Zagade, IAS

Area
  - Total: 426 km^{2} (164 sq mi)
- Elevation: 6.7 m (22 ft)

Population (2011)
  - Total: 6,748,026
  - Density: 15,800/km^{2} (41,000/sq mi)
- Demonym(s): Chennaiite; Chennai karan Chennai wasi

Languages
  - Official: Tamil, English
- Time zone: UTC+5:30 (IST)
- PIN: 600XXX
- Telephone code: 44
- ISO 3166 code: 044
- Vehicle registration: TN01 - TN14; TN18; TN22; TN85
- Per capita income (2022-23): ₹585,501 (US$7,448.7)
- Sex ratio: 951 female / 1000 male
- Nominal GDP (2022-23): ₹289,481.19 crore (US$36.83 billion)
- Website: chennai.nic.in

Chennai district, also known as Madras district, (Note: Both of these terms are also often used as metonyms for the Chennai metropolitan area's trading and financial services industries, which continue a notable history of being largely based in the city. The name Chennai is colloquially used for a far wider area than just the city. Chennai most often denotes the sprawling Chennai metropolis, including parts from the three districts of Tamil Nadu adjacent to the city/district of Chennai itself. This wider usage of Chennai is documented as far back as 1639, when the Madras Municipal Corporation was created.) It is one of the 38 districts in the state of Tamil Nadu, India. It is the smallest and the most densely populated district in the state. The district is coterminous with the city of Chennai, which is administered by the Greater Chennai Corporation It is surrounded by Tiruvallur district in the north and the west, Kanchipuram district in the south-west, Chenglpattu district in the south, and the Bay of Bengal in the east.

Chennai district was originally created as Madras district by the British East India Company in 1798 for the revenue administration of the presidency town of Madras. The district has been existence since then barring a short period between 1860 and 1870 when the Madras district was abolished and its area administered as part of Chingleput district. Chennai district comprises only a single municipal body - the Greater Chennai Corporation and for most its history, it has been the smallest, most populous, most urbanised as well as the most densely populated district in the state.

As of 2011, the district had a population of 67,48,026 with a sex ratio of 989 females for every 1,000 males. In 2018, the district's limits were expanded, aligning with that of the newly expanded Greater Chennai Corporation, which had annexed adjacent municipalities. This resulted in the area being increased from 175 square kilometres (68 mi^{2}) to 426 square kilometres (164 mi^{2}). The district is divided into three revenue divisions and sixteen taluks.

== Etymology ==
The name Chennai was derived from Damarla Chennappa Nayak, the father of a general of the Vijayanagar Empire.

== Geography ==
Chennai district covers an area of 426 km^{2} located on the Eastern Coastal Plains of India. It is situated on the northeastern corner of Tamil Nadu along the Coramandel coast, a region bounded by the Bay of Bengal and is surrounded inland by the districts of Tiruvallur, Kanchipuram and Chengalpattu. It lies between 12°59' and 13°9' of the northern latitude and 80°12' and 80°19' of the eastern longitude at an average altitude of 6 metres above sea level on a 'sandy shelving breaker swept' beach. Terrain slope varies from 1:5000 to 1:10,000. The terrain is very flat with contours ranging from 2 m to 10 m above mean sea level with a few isolated hillocks in the southwest beyond the district limits at St. Thomas Mount, Pallavaram and Tambaram.

The district runs inland in a rugged semi-circular fashion and its coastline is about 25.60 km (2.5% of the total coastline of Tamil Nadu). Because of its strategic location and economic importance, it is referred to as the "Gateway of South India." The drainage system includes two rivers, namely, Cooum (flowing in the northern part) and Adyar (flowing in the southern part), a canal (the Buckingham), and a stream (the Otteri Nullah) slicing the district into several islands.

The district falls under Seismic Zone III indicating a moderate risk of earthquake. Geologically the district is divided into three regions, namely, sandy, clayey and hard-rock regions. The soil comprises clay, shale and sandstone.

Of the total land area, reserved forests cover 2.71 km^{2} and is concentrated in and around the Guindy National Park region, one of the few national parks in the world located within a city. The forest cover of the district is as follows:

Class	Area (ha)	Percentage
Dense forest	151.01	1.16
Moderate dense TOF	121.16	0.93
Non-forest	12,215.56	94.06
Open forest	114.24	0.88
Open TOF	153.73	1.18
Water	231.46	1.78
Total	12,987.16	100

=== Climate ===
Chennai has a Tropical savanna climate (Köppen: As, bordering Aw).

Climate data for Chennai, India
Month	Jan	Feb	Mar	Apr	May	Jun	Jul	Aug	Sep	Oct	Nov	Dec	Year
Record high °C (°F)	33 (91)	37 (99)	39 (102)	43 (109)	45 (113)	43 (109)	41 (106)	40 (104)	39 (102)	39 (102)	34 (93)	33 (91)	45 (113)
Mean daily maximum °C (°F)	29 (84)	31 (88)	33 (91)	35 (95)	38 (100)	38 (100)	36 (97)	35 (95)	34 (93)	32 (90)	29 (84)	29 (84)	33 (92)
Mean daily minimum °C (°F)	19 (66)	20 (68)	22 (72)	26 (79)	28 (82)	27 (81)	26 (79)	26 (79)	25 (77)	24 (75)	22 (72)	21 (70)	24 (75)
Record low °C (°F)	14 (57)	15 (59)	17 (63)	20 (68)	21 (70)	21 (70)	22 (72)	21 (70)	21 (70)	17 (63)	15 (59)	14 (57)	14 (57)
Average precipitation mm (inches)	16.2 (0.64)	3.7 (0.15)	3.0 (0.12)	13.6 (0.54)	48.9 (1.93)	53.7 (2.11)	97.8 (3.85)	149.7 (5.89)	109.1 (4.30)	282.7 (11.13)	350.3 (13.79)	138.2 (5.44)	1,266.9 (49.88)
Source: Indian Meteorological Department

== History ==
On 2 November 1798, the territory under the Corporation of Madras and the villages of the jaghire of Chingleput that formed part of the jurisdiction of the Recorder's Court at Madras were made the charge of a separate Sheristadar directly subordinate to the Board of Revenue. A few years later, the Sheristadar, originally called "Land Customer", was elevated to the status of a District Collector with his duties having been extended to the collection of abkari and sea customs, which were previously under a "Sea Customer".The arrangement lasted till 1860, when the district of Madras was merged with that of Chingleput. The old boundaries were subsequently restored in July 1870.

The Collectorate of Madras District functioned from 1807 to 1992 from Bentinck Building, named after Lord William Bentinck, who served as Governor of Madras from 1803 to 1807 and Governor-General of India from 1834 to 1835. In 1992, the building - a heritage structure on Rajaji Salai was demolished. A new collectorate building, M. Singaravelar Maligai named in honour of a trade union leader was built at the same spot.

Until 2011, the boundaries of Chennai district were co-terminus with that of the Greater Chennai Corporation. However, on 1 October 2011, the Chennai Corporation was expanded to include 25 village and 8 town panchayats and 9 municipalities from Kanchipuram and Tiruvallur districts while the revenue administrations of these newly-incorporated areas continued under existing arrangements. However, due to coordination issues, in 2018, the boundaries of Chennai district were regularized by incorporating the revenue administrations of these areas in Chennai district.

The city district of Madras originally consisted of a single taluk but in 1951, for administrative reasons, was sub-divided into a Madras North and Madras South taluks with the Poonamallee High Road forming the boundary between the two taluks and a sub-taluk (firka) comprising of 30 revenue villages including the taluk headquarters that had been transferred to Madras District from the Saidapet taluk of Chingleput district in 1946.In 1971, the number of taluks was increased to five - Madras North-West, Madras North-East, Madras Central, Madras South-West and Madras South-East. The taluks were subsequently renamed as Egmore-Nungambakam, Fort-Tondiarpet, Mambalam-Guindy, Mylapore-Triplicane and Perambur-Purasawalkam. The district was completely reorganized into 10 taluks in 2013. In 2018, with the addition of revenue villages from the Tiruvallur and Kanchipuram districts and expansion of the city district's boundaries, the number of taluks was increased to 16.

== Demographics ==
According to 2011 census, Chennai district had a population of 4,646,732 in unexpanded old limits area of 176 sq.km. with a sex ratio of 989 females for every 1,000 males, much above the national average of 929. Scheduled Castes and Scheduled Tribes accounted for 16.78% and 0.22% of the population respectively. The average literacy of the district was 81.27%, compared to the national average of 72.99%. With the expanded limits to 426 sq. km. Chennai district had a population of 6,748,026 as per 2011 census data.

The district had a total of 1,154,982 households. There were a total of 1,817,297 workers, being 10,210 cultivators, 10,251 main agricultural labourers, 29,143 in household industries, 1,569,950 other workers, 197,743 marginal workers, 4,244 marginal cultivators, 3,423 marginal agricultural labourers, 8,202 marginal workers in household industries and 181,874 other marginal workers.

=== Religion ===
Religion in Chennai district (2011)
Religion	Percent
Hinduism	80.73%
Islam	9.45%
Christianity	7.72%
Jainism	1.11%
Other or not stated	0.93%

== Administration and politics ==
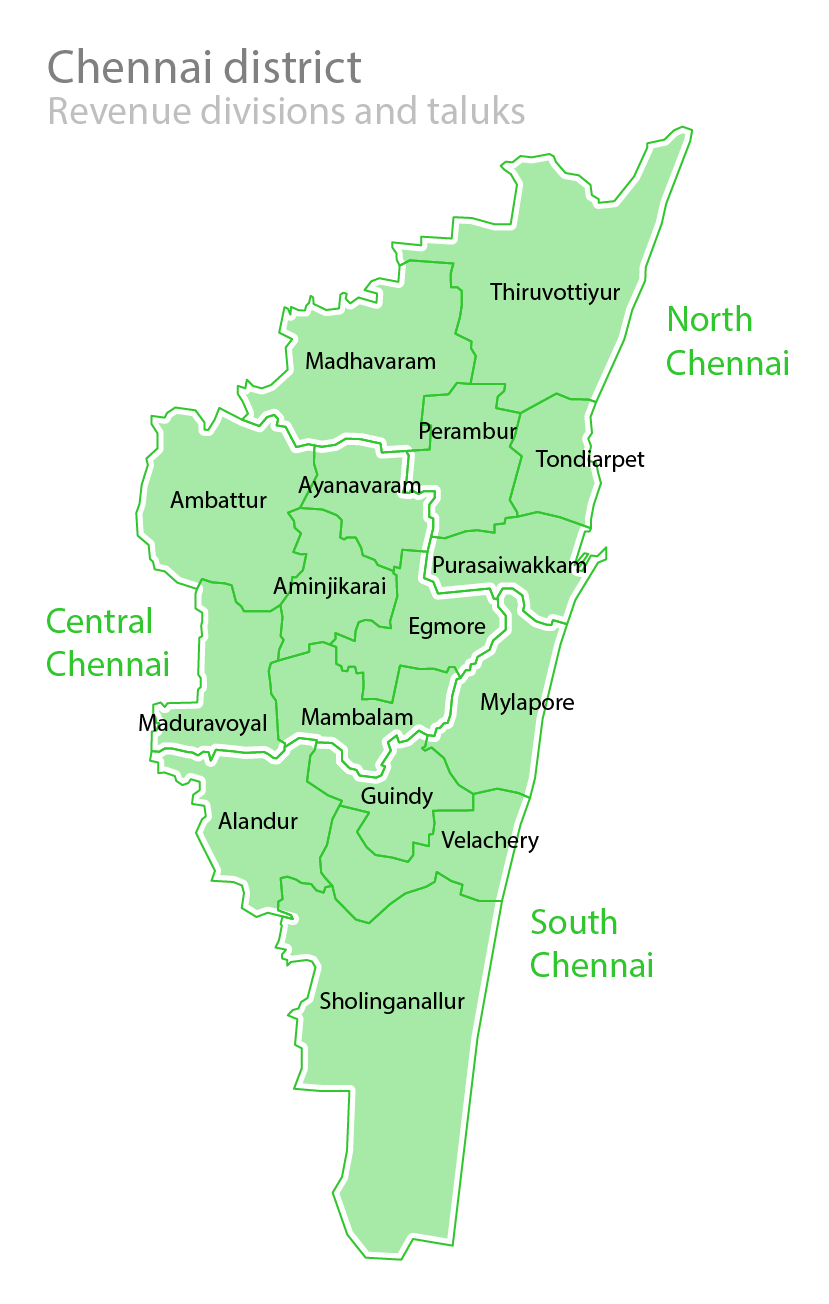
Divisions of Chennai district

In 2013, five taluks on the district were split to create five new ones: Velachery, Purasawalkam, Ayanavaram, Aminjikarai and Guindy.

In January 2018, the state government announced that the district will be expanded to match the boundaries of the Greater Chennai Corporation. This integrated six additional taluks from Tiruvallur and Kanchipuram districts into the Chennai district. The new divisions and taluks of the district are:

=== Revenue divisions and taluks ===
- North Chennai Revenue Division, headquartered at Tondiarpet, contains taluks of Tiruvottiyur, Madhavaram, Perambur, Tondiarpet, and Purasaiwalkam.
- Central Chennai Revenue Division, headquartered at Ambattur, contains the taluks of Mambalam, Egmore, Aminjikarai, Ayanavaram, Kolathur, Ambattur, and Maduravoyal.
- South Chennai Revenue Division, headquartered at Guindy, contains the taluks of Mylapore, Guindy, Velachery, Alandur, and Sholinganallur.

=== Members of Parliament ===
PC No.	Constituency	Political party	Elected representative
1	Chennai North	DMK	Kalanidhi Veeraswamy
2	Chennai South	DMK	T. Thamizhachi Thangapandian
3	Chennai Central	DMK	Dayanidhi Maran
4	Sriperumbudur (partially)	DMK	T. R. Baalu

=== Assembly constituencies ===
District	No.	Constituency	Name	Party	Alliance	Remarks
Chennai	7	Maduravoyal	P. Rhevanth Charan	TVK	TVK+	
Chennai	8	Ambattur	G. Balamurugan	TVK	TVK+	
Chennai	9	Madavaram	M. L. Vijayprabhu	TVK	TVK+	
Chennai	10	Thiruvottiyur	N. Senthil Kumar	TVK	TVK+	
Chennai	11	Dr. Radhakrishnan Nagar	N. Marie Wilson	TVK	TVK+	Cabinet Minister
Chennai	12	Perambur	C. Joseph Vijay	TVK	TVK+	Chief Minister
Chennai	13	Kolathur	V. S. Babu	TVK	TVK+	
Chennai	14	Villivakkam	Aadhav Arjuna	TVK	TVK+	Cabinet Minister
Chennai	15	Thiru-Vi-Ka-Nagar (SC)	M. R. Pallavi	TVK	TVK+	
Chennai	16	Egmore (SC)	A. Rajmohan	TVK	TVK+	Cabinet Minister
Chennai	17	Royapuram	K. V. Vijay Damu	TVK	TVK+	
Chennai	18	Harbour	P. K. Sekar Babu	DMK	SPA	
Chennai	19	Chepauk-Thiruvallikeni	Udhayanidhi Stalin	DMK	SPA	Leader of the Opposition
Chennai	20	Thousand Lights	J. C. D. Prabhakar	TVK	TVK+	Speaker
Chennai	21	Anna Nagar	V. K. Ramkumar	TVK	TVK+	
Chennai	22	Virugampakkam	R. Sabarinathan	TVK	TVK+	Government Whip
Chennai	23	Saidapet	M. Arul Prakasam	TVK	TVK+	
Chennai	24	Thiyagarayanagar	Bussy N. Anand	TVK	TVK+	Cabinet Minister
Chennai	25	Mylapore	P. Venkataramanan	TVK	TVK+	Cabinet Minister
Chennai	26	Velachery	R. Kumar	TVK	TVK+	Cabinet Minister
Chennai	27	Sholinganallur	P. Saravanan	TVK	TVK+	
Chennai	28	Alandur	M. Harish	TVK	TVK+	

== See also ==
- Chennai metropolitan area
- Delhi
- Kolkata district
- List of districts of Tamil Nadu
- Mumbai City district
