= K. V. Vijay Damu =

Indian politician (born 1980)

Member of the Tamil Nadu Legislative Assembly
- Incumbent
- Assumed office 4 May 2026
- Preceded by: Idream R. Murthy
- Constituency: Royapuram Assembly constituency

Personal details
- Party: Tamilaga Vettri Kazhagam
- Occupation: Auto consulting business

K. V. Vijay Damu (born 1980) is an Indian politician from Tamil Nadu. He is a member of the Tamil Nadu Legislative Assembly from Royapuram Assembly constituency in Chennai district representing Tamilaga Vettri Kazhagam.

== Early life ==
Damu is from Velachery, Chennai. He is the son of Kanniyappan. He studied till Class 9 at the Corporation High School, Adyar, Chennai and dropped out in 1993. He runs his own Auto Consulting business.

== Career ==
Damu became an MLA for the first time winning the 2026 Tamil Nadu Legislative Assembly election from Royapuram Assembly constituency representing Tamilaga Vettri Kazhagam. He polled 59,091 votes and defeated his nearest rival, Subair Khan of the Dravida Munnetra Kazhagam, by a margin of votes.

== Electoral Performance ==
2026 Tamil Nadu Legislative Assembly election: Royapuram
Party	Candidate	Votes	%	±%
TVK	K. V. Vijay Damu	59,091	46.40	New
DMK	Subair Khan	44,842	35.21	▼18.35
AIADMK	D. Jayakumar	18,420	14.46	▼16.00
NTK	S Bbabu Mailan	2,947	2.31	▼4.30
NOTA	NOTA	459	0.36	▼0.39
Margin of victory		14,249	11.19	▼11.90
Turnout		1,27,356		
Rejected ballots				
Registered electors		1,59,654		
TVK gain from DMK		Swing	▲46.40	
