= St. Andrew's Church, Chennai =

St. Andrew's Church (The Kirk)
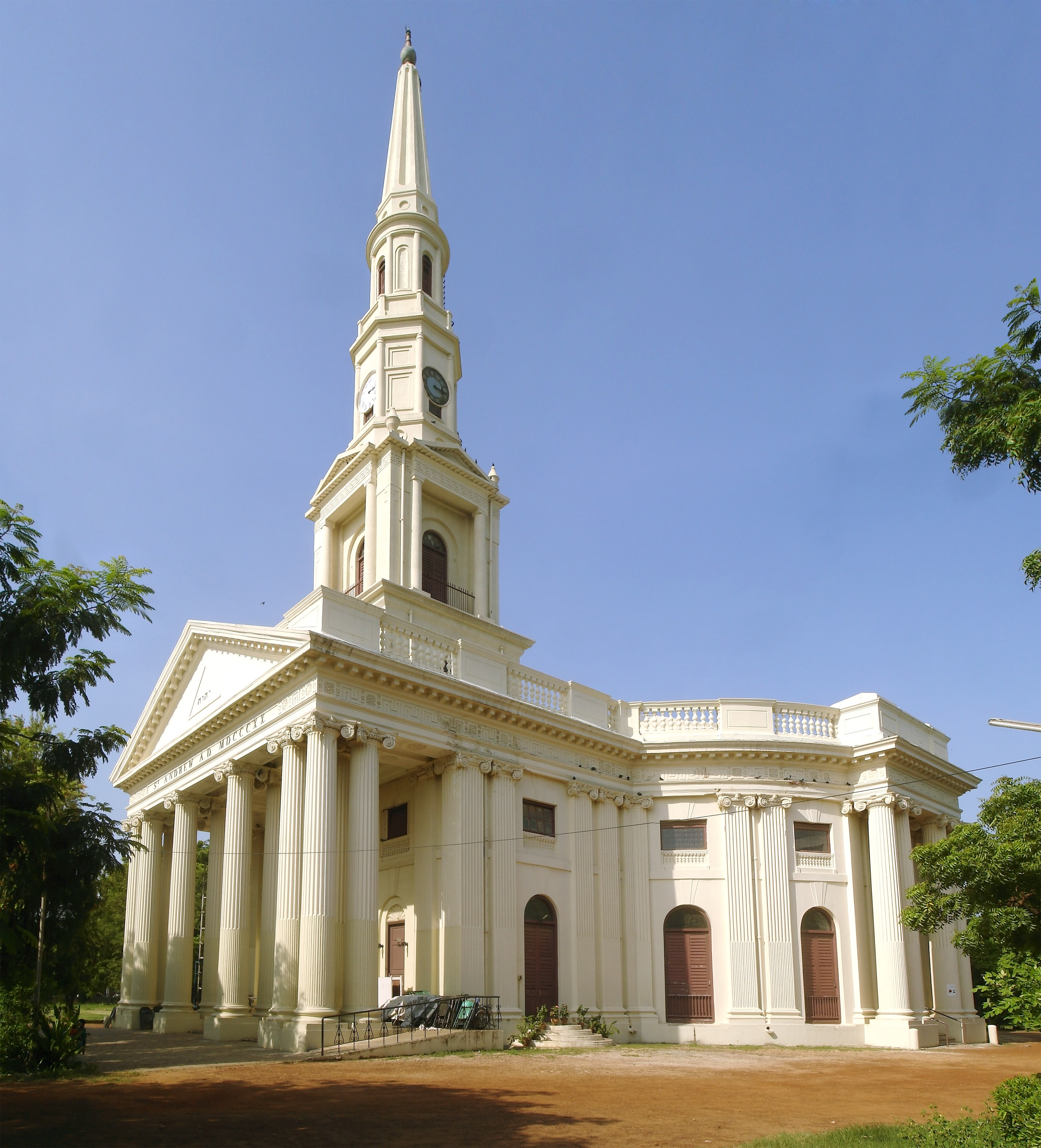
- The Kirk
- St. Andrew's Church (The Kirk)
- 13°4′47.28″N 80°15′49.32″E
- Location: Chennai, Tamil Nadu
- Country: India
- Denomination: Presbyterian
- Website: www.thekirk.in

Architecture
- Functional status: Active
- Style: Palladian architecture
- Completed: 1821; 205 years ago

St. Andrew's Church (Tamil: புனித அந்திரேயா கோவில்) in Egmore, Chennai, India was built to serve the Scottish community in Chennai. Building started 6 April 1818 and the church was consecrated in 1821. It is one of the oldest churches in Madras. Its design was modelled on St Martin-in-the-Fields and along with St. George's Church, Dublin, it is considered one of the finest stylistic "daughter" churches to the famous Trafalgar Square structure.

== Architecture ==
The church shows prominent features of Neoclassical architecture, it is inspired by St Martin-in-the-Fields in London. It was designed and executed by Major Thomas de Havilland and Colonel James Caldwell of the Madras Engineers. The body of the church is a circle, with rectangular compartments to the east and west. The circular part 24.5 m in diameter, is crowned by a shallow masonry dome colored a deep blue. This is painted with golden stars and supported by 16 fluted pillars with Corinthian capitals.

=== Dome ===
An architectural marvel, the dome has a framework of brick supported by an annular arch and is filled in by pottery cones. Its blue interior is formed by crushed sea shells mixed with lapis lazuli.

=== Stained Glass ===
The stained-glass windows above the main altar, in warm, rich colors, are among the glories of the church.

=== Pipe organ ===
Dominating the altar is the pipe organ in dull green and burnished gold. Built in New Yorkshire, England, this instrument was installed in 1883.

== Tradition ==
St. Andrew's Church (The Kirk) is of the Scottish Presbyterian tradition and continues to belong to it. Its form of worship and system of governance continue to be truly Presbyterian. However, it is free to follow and does include other orders of service used by any other Church with which it is doctrinally like-minded.

== Gallery ==
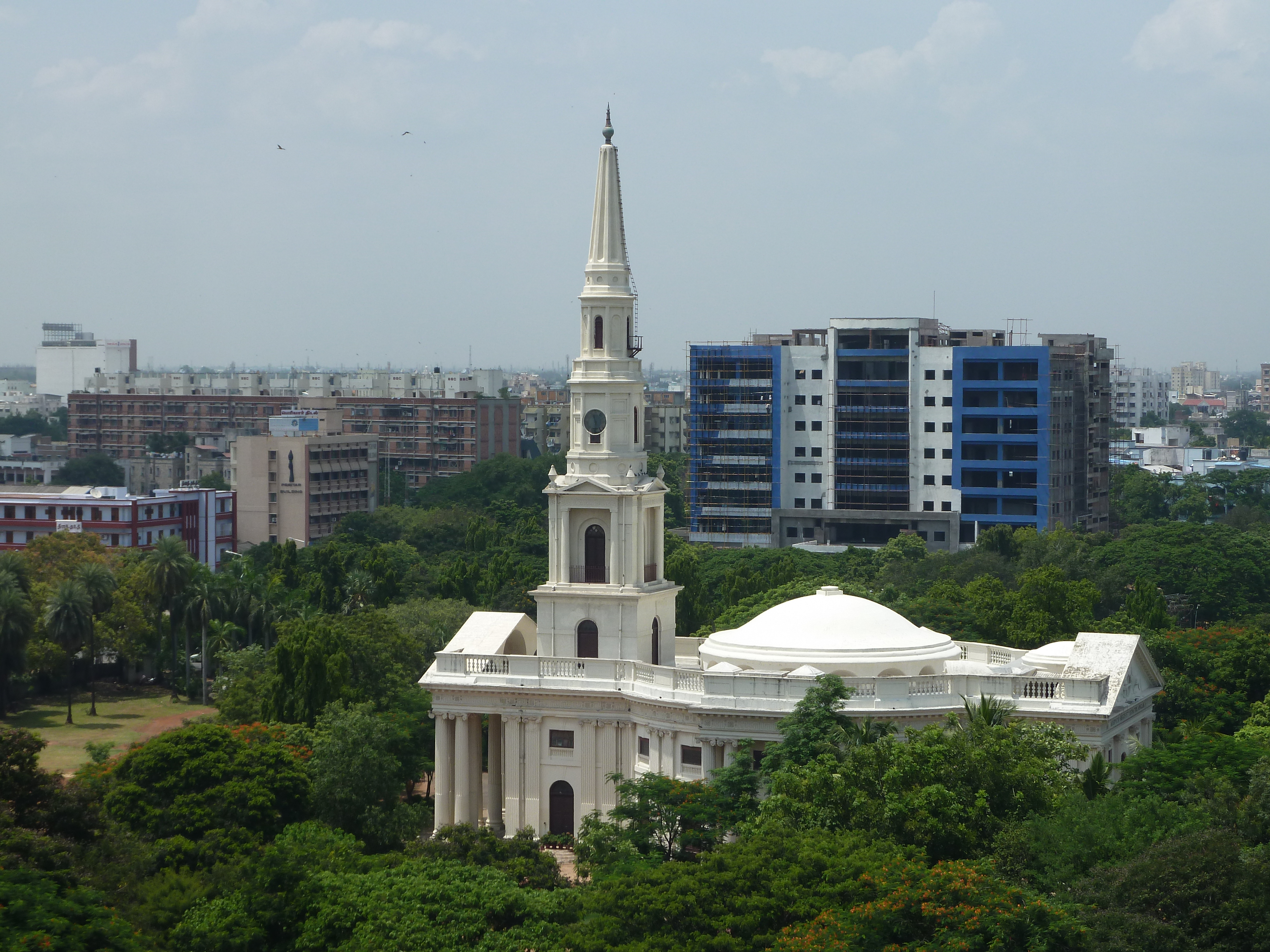
A view from the top

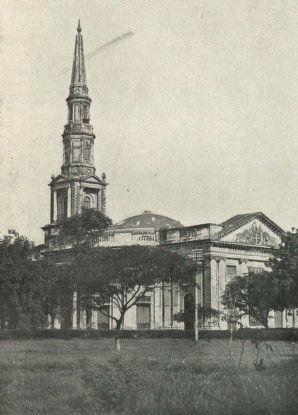
St. Andrew's Church, c. 1905

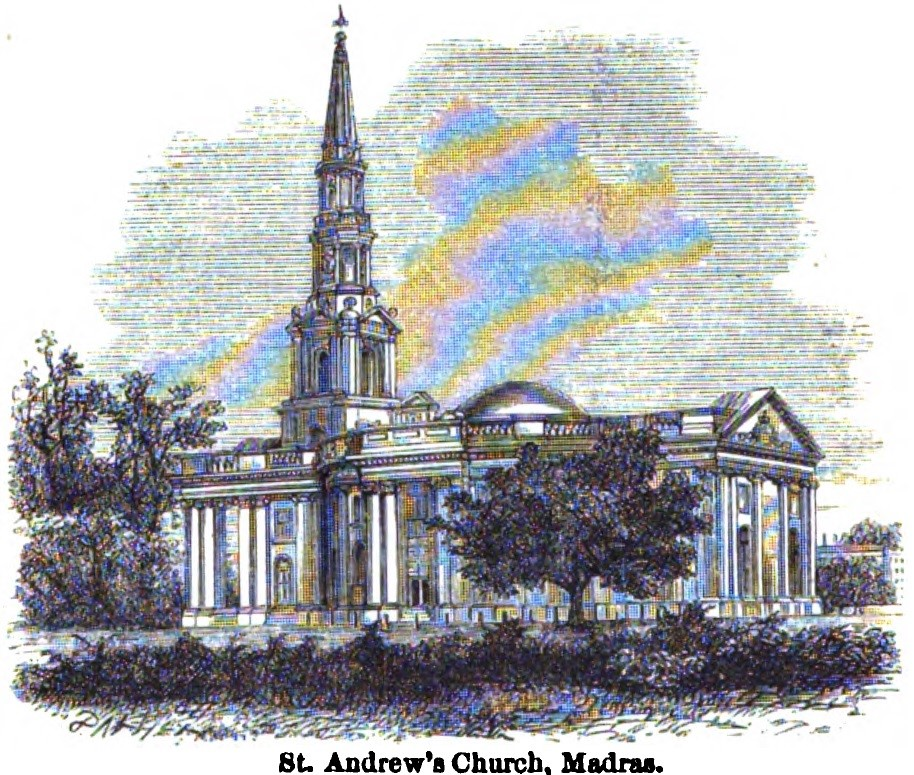
St. Andrew's Church, Madras (MacLeod, p. 120, 1871)

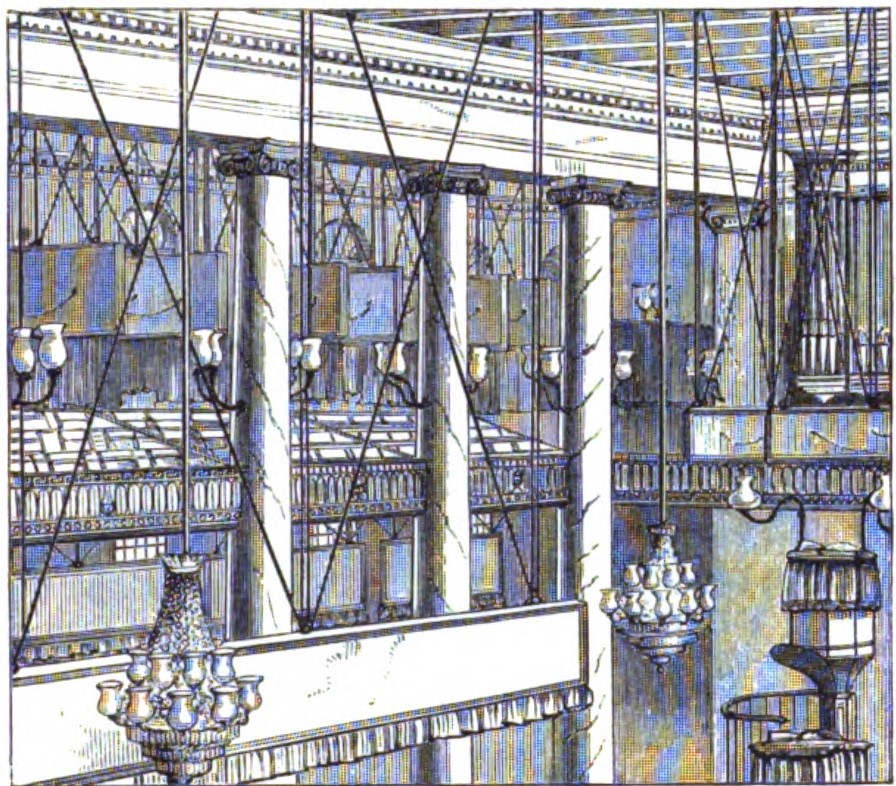
Interiors of St. Andrew's Church, Madras (MacLeod, p. 120, 1871)
