= M. L. Vijay Prabhu =

Indian politician

M. Logabiraman Vijay Prabhu (born 1989) is an Indian politician from Tamil Nadu. He is a member of the Tamil Nadu Legislative Assembly from Madavaram Assembly constituency in the erstwhile Thiruvallur district, presently in Chennai district, representing Tamilaga Vettri Kazhagam.

== Early life and education ==
Prabhu is from Thiruvallur, Tamil Nadu. He is the son of M. E Logabiraman. He passed Class 10 at St. Joseph's Higher Secondary Secondary School in 2005 and 2010−2022 he worked in MNC company manufacturing unit as a union leader, he is very well knowledge in industrial & electrical segments and completed his Bachelor of Arts & Bachelor of Laws in 2022 at Vikrama Simhapuri University, Andhra Pradesh. He also did a Diploma in Electrical Engineering at P.T.Lee Chengalvaraya Naicker Polytechnic College from 2005 to 2008.

== Career ==
Prabhu became an MLA for the first time winning on debut in the 2026 Tamil Nadu Legislative Assembly election from Madavaram Assembly constituency representing Tamilaga Vettri Kazhagam. He polled 1,90,462 votes and defeated his nearest rival, S.Sudharsanam of the Dravida Munnetra Kazhagam, by a margin of 94,985 votes.
