= Egmore =

Neighbourhood in Tamil Nadu, India

- Neighbourhood
- Egmore, Chennai, Tamil Nadu
- Coordinates: 13.0732°N 80.2609°E
- Country: India
- State: Tamil Nadu
- District: Chennai
- Metro: Chennai
- Named for: Railway Station

Government
  - Type: Corporation
  - Body: Greater Chennai Corporation
- Elevation: 55 m (180 ft)

Languages
  - Official: Tamil
- Time zone: UTC+5:30 (IST)
- PIN: 600008
- Vidhan Sabha constituency: Ezhumboor

Egmore is a neighbourhood of Chennai, India situated about 2.0 kilometres (1.2 miles) from kilometre zero of Chennai city. Lying on a peninsular bulge on the northern banks of the Coovum River, apart from being an important transportation and tourism hub as well as shopping district, Egmore also has residential colonies. The Egmore Railway Station was formerly the main terminus of the South Indian Railway Company and later, the metre gauge section and still an important station of Southern division of the Indian Railways and one of the two main railway terminii of Chennai city, the other being the Chennai Central railway station. The Government Museum, Chennai situated at Egmore is the second oldest museum in India and one of the largest in the country. Tamil Nadu Archives and Historical Research, the official archival facility of the Tamil Nadu government, is also situated in Egmore.

While the region was probably inhabited as early as the Megalithic period, the earliest inscriptional references to Egmore date to that of the Chola king Kulothunga I, who reigned from 1070 to 1120. During the Vijayanagar Empire, the region was subdivided into fiefs which were held by military chieftains of Nayaks. Towards the end of the 17th century, Egmore passed on to the Mughal Empire and was acquired by the British East India Company in 1693 along with four other villages. Many British merchants, army officers and employees of the East India Company set up garden houses in Egmore and the Egmore Redoubt was constructed as a fort to protect the western frontiers of Madras city. Egmore was taken by the Mysore general Hyder Ali during the Second Anglo-Mysore War but subsequently restored to the Company. Egmore forms the jurisdiction of an Assistant Superintendent of Police, a taluk headquarters and an MLA constituency in the Tamil Nadu Legislative Assembly.

Egmore is an uniform mix of residential colonies and shopping districts, the latter surrounding Pantheon Road which is also a popular tourist hub. Egmore has a significant number of heritage monuments from the British period - the Government Museum, the Connemara Public Library, Government College of Arts, St. Andrew's Church, the Women and Children's Hospital, the Municipal Magistrate Court, the Police Commissioner Office building and the Egmore Post Office being the most important of them. Egmore also has prestigious schools, two sports stadiums, luxury hotels, tourist offices, recreation clubs and some of the oldest shopping malls in Chennai. As of 2026, Egmore had some of the highest real estate prices in Chennai city.

== History ==
The earliest references to Egmore occur in the inscriptions of the Chola king Kulothunga I. Under the Chola Empire, Egmore was the headquarters of an administrative division or Nadu called Elumbur Nadu. An inscription of the Nellore Chola king Vijaya Kanda Gopal dated 2 September 1264 speaks of a village in Elumur-Tudarmuni Nadu in Pulal Kottam. A Vijayanagar period inscription of Sriranganatha Yadavaraya records an endowment to a monastery in Thiruvottriyur by a resident of Serruppedu (identified with the present day Chetpet) in Elumur-Tudarmuni Nadu.

Egmore is the Anglicised form of "Ezhumbur", the name of a pre-British era village situated on the northern banks of the River. Despite the fact that Egmore had been a part of the East India Company's possessions since 1720, it was not until the "Golden age of British rule" stretching from 1858 to 1947 that Egmore witnessed some real growth. The Egmore Museum was one of the first notable monuments to be constructed here. The construction of this famous landmark was undertaken immediately after the Sepoy Mutiny of 1857. The Connemara Library was created as an annex housing the museum's vast book collection and became operational in 1896.

Egmore, in 1796, was the site of the Military Male Orphan Asylum near Madras. This asylum was headed by Andrew Bell, who invented the Madras System for schooling there.

== Various buildings ==
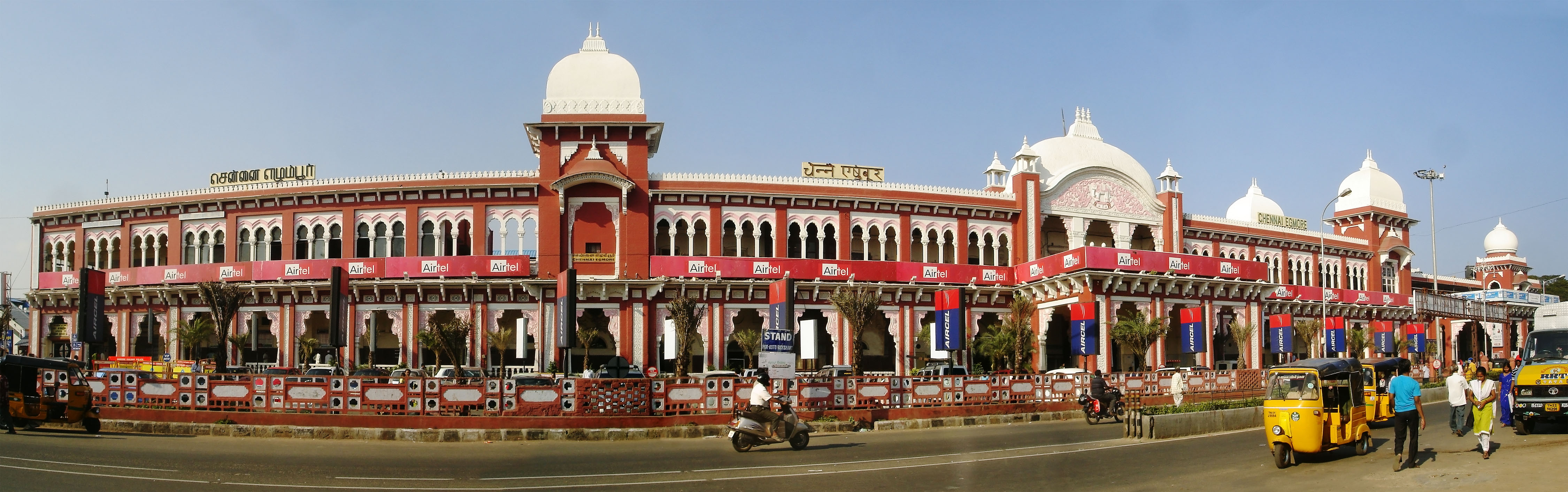
Egmore Railway station

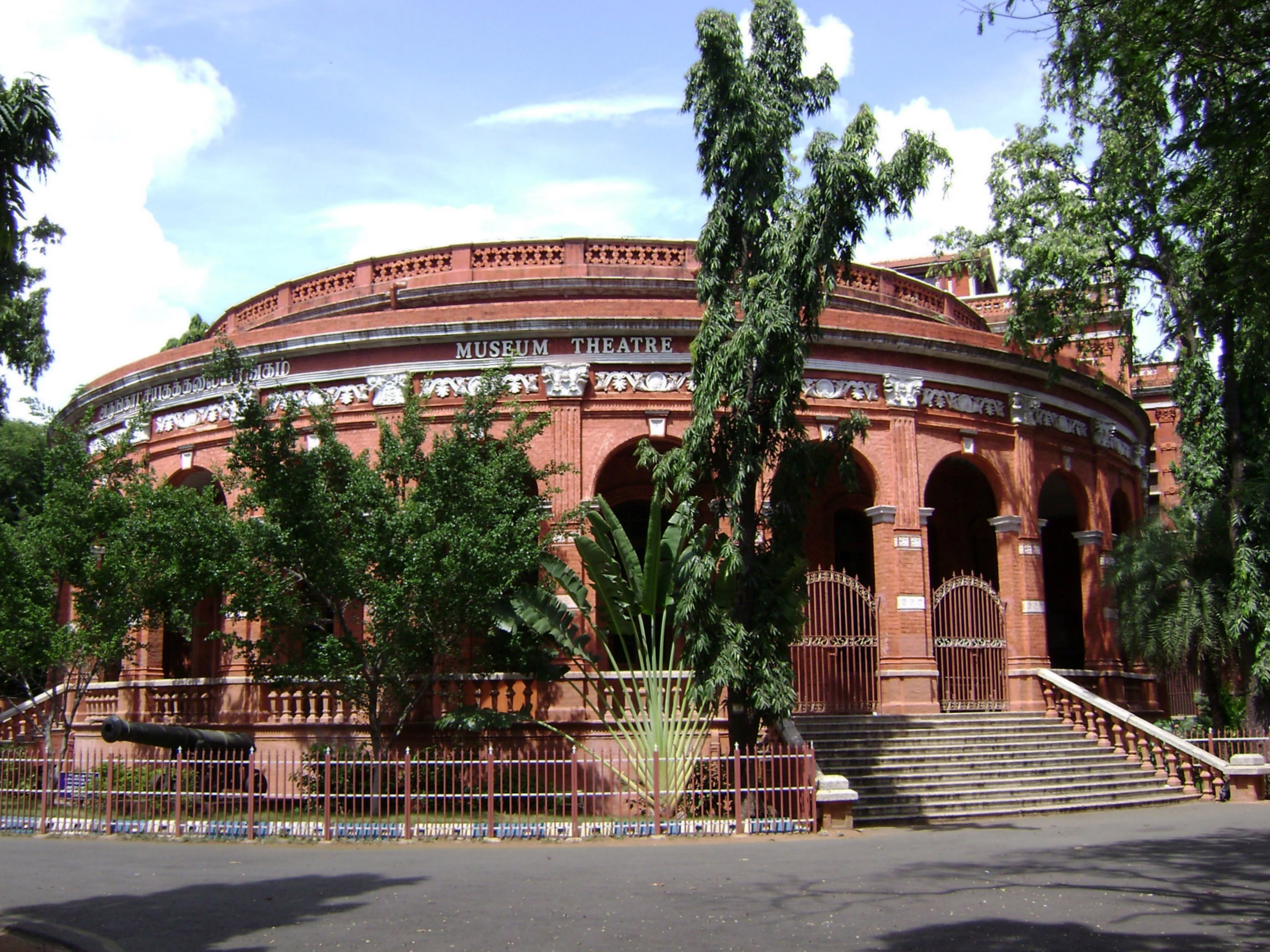
Museum Theatre in Government museum, Egmore, Chennai

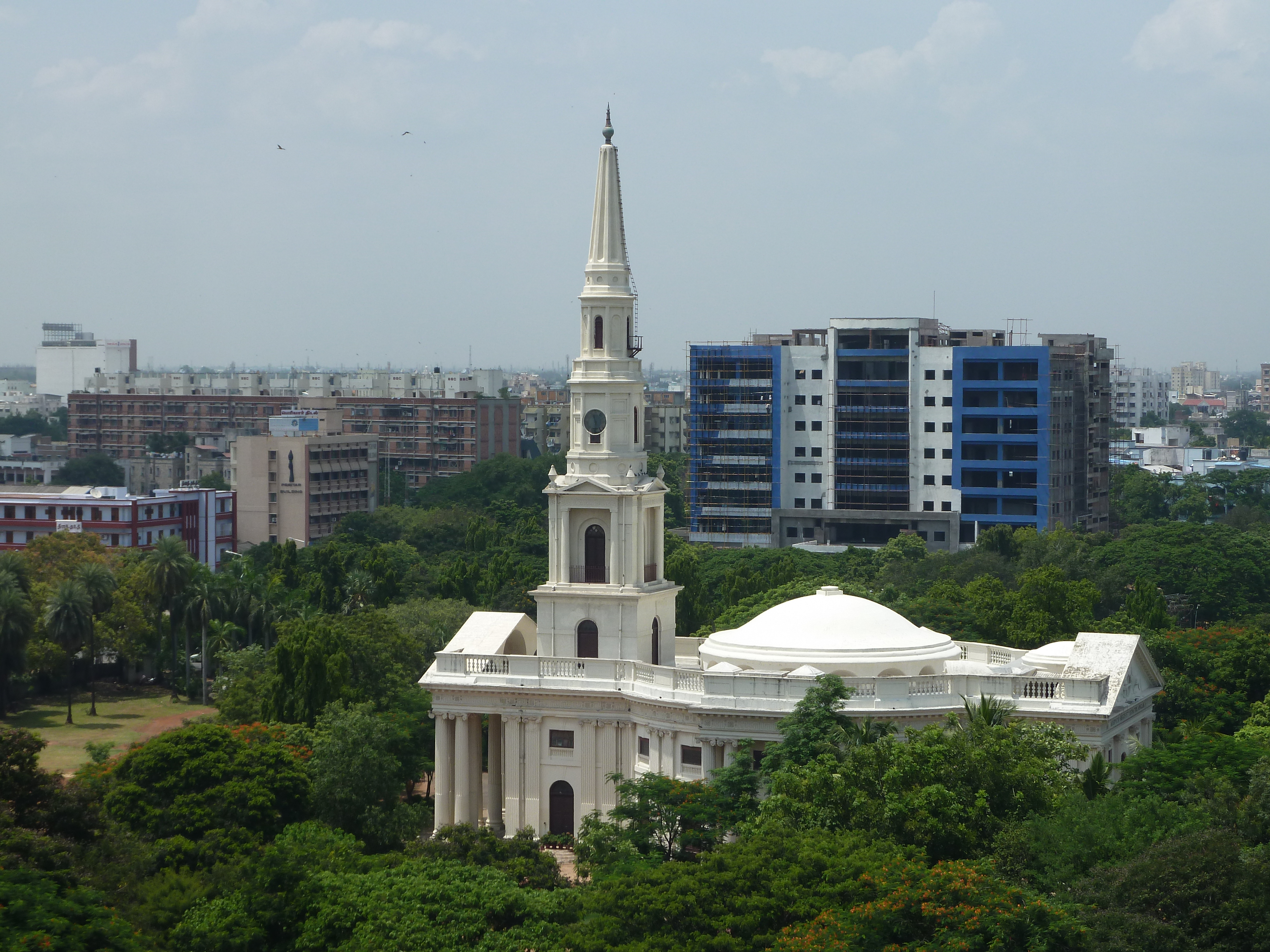
St Andrew's Church

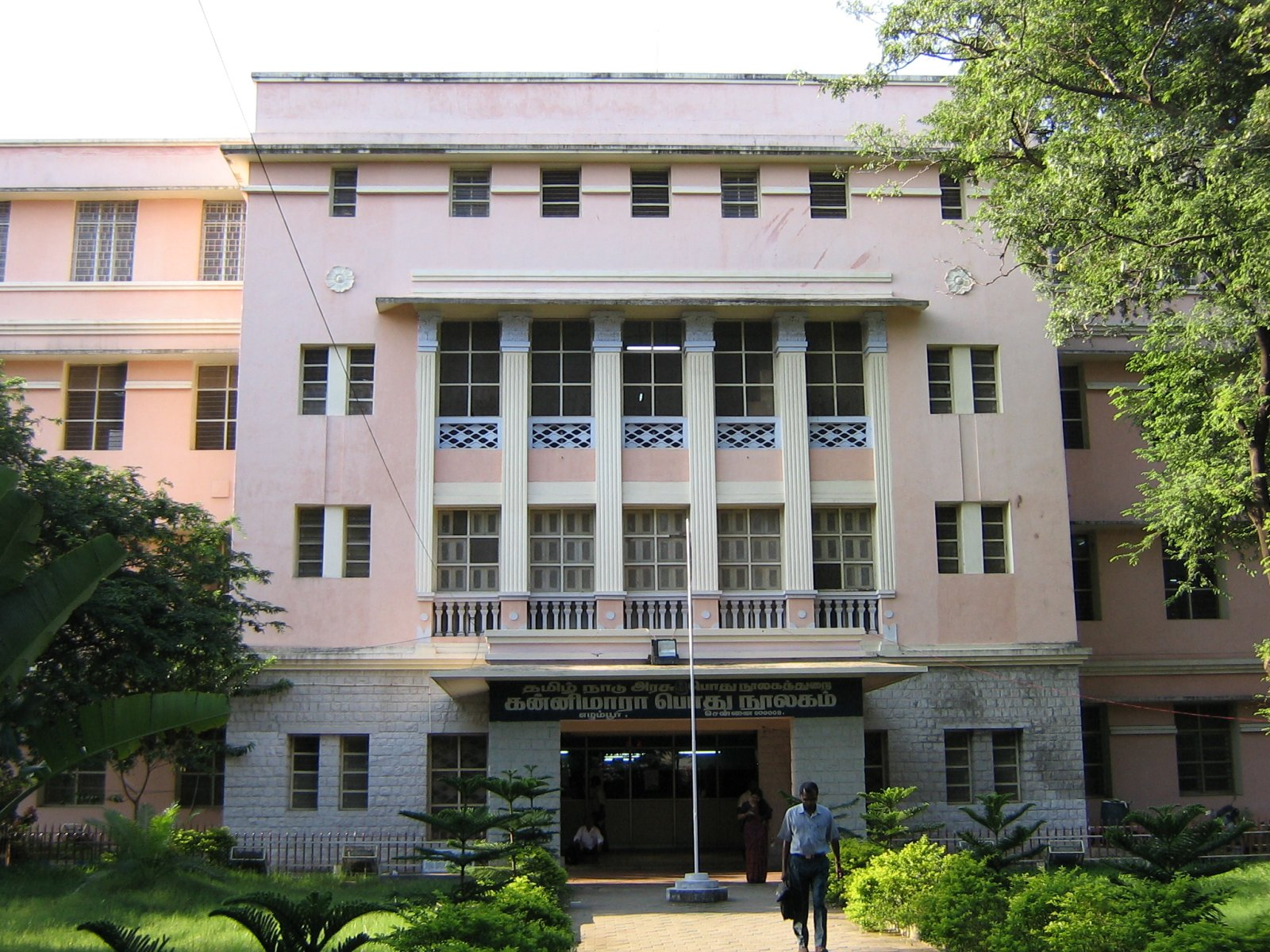
Connemara Public Library

- Chennai Egmore railway station
- Office of the commissioner of Greater Chennai Police department.
- Spencer Plaza
- Prince Plaza
- Hotel Chennai Gate
- Hotel Taj Connemara
- Hotel Ambassador Pallava
- Hotel Westin Park
- Hotel Ashoka
- Parsn Towers
- Madras Studio
- Rajarathinam Stadium
- Mayor Radhakrishnan Hockey Stadium
- Sri Lanka Maha Bodhi Centre

Churches

- St Andrew's Church, Chennai (an old Scottish Presbyterian Church commonly referred to as the 'Kirk')
- Good Shepherd's Convent
- Wesley Church, a Methodist church on the Poonamallee High Road. The church was established and consecrated in 1905 on the site of a garden house purchased by the Mission in 1892.

Education

- Connemara Public Library, one of the biggest libraries in India
- The National Art Gallery (Chennai)
- Government Museum, Chennai
- Directorate of Public Instruction (DPI)
- Women's Christian College
- Ethiraj College for Women
- Don Bosco Higher Secondary School
- Government College of Fine Arts, Chennai
- Madras School of Social Work
- Digital Scholar - Digital Marketing Institute

== Politics ==
Egmore vote by alliance in assembly elections
Year	All India Anna Dravida Munnetra Kazhagam (AIADMK)	Dravida Munnetra Kazhagam (DMK)
2006	40.3% 31,975	48.5% 38,455
2001	47.6% 33,103	47.7% 33,189
1996	19.7% 13,876	72.6% 51,061
1991	47.8% 21,936	50.5% 23,139
1989*	21.1% 16,124	49.8% 38,032
1984	47.4% 27,246	51.8% 29,795
1980	37.6% 23,444	61.2% 38,200
1977	28.0% 19,414	38.6% 26,746

=== State assembly politics ===
Egmore has been a stronghold for Dravida Munnetra Kazhagam (DMK), ever since the party's creation. Other than barely losing to Congress in 1962 election, it has consistently voted for DMK, even during times of low popularity for the DMK. However, recently the Anna Dravida Munnetra Kazhagam (ADMK), have made significant in-grounds, like they have in many localities around Chennai, which used to be DMK strongholds. Egmore is also 1 of the two total constituents won by DMK in 1991 election. This constituent is reserved for scheduled caste. This is also the first MLA seat held by K Anbazhagan, when he won it in 1957 election.

- Note: In 1989, ADMK was split between Jayalalithaa faction and Janaki faction, and only the Jayalalithaa faction is reported in the ADMK column since they were the highest vote getter from the divided faction. The Janaki faction got 4,293, which is about 5.6% of the voters.

=== Lok Sabha politics ===
Egmore assembly constituency is part of Chennai Central (Lok Sabha constituency).

== Transport ==
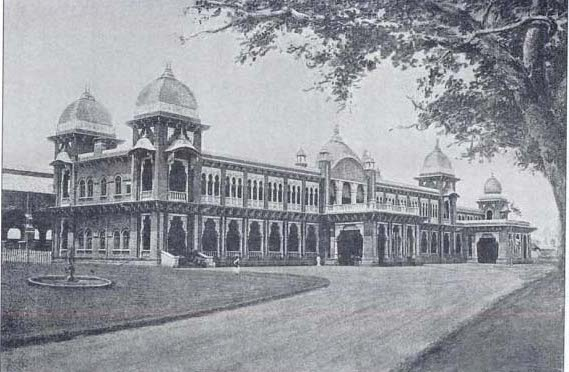
Madras Egmore railway station in 1926

Egmore Railway Station is the second most important in the state of Tamil Nadu after the Chennai Central Railway Station. It was constructed in 1908 and functioned as the headquarters of the now defunct Madras and Southern Mahratta Railway till 1951.

Egmore is well connected to other parts of the city. Many of the state-run Metropolitan Transport Corporation (MTC) buses run through Egmore. Egmore has its own suburban train station on the Chennai Beach - Tambaram Line, which connects it to other parts of the city.
