= G. Beem Rao =

Indian politician

G Beem Rao is an Indian politician and was a member of the 14th Tamil Nadu Legislative Assembly from the Maduravoyal constituency. He represented the Communist Party of India (Marxist) party.

The elections of 2016 resulted in his constituency being won by P. Benjamin.

== Electoral performance ==
2016 Tamil Nadu Legislative Assembly election: Maduravoyal
Party	Candidate	Votes	%	±%
AIADMK	P. Benjamin	99,739	40.12%	New
INC	R. Rajesh	91,337	36.74%	New
CPI(M)	G. Beem Rao	19,612	7.89%	−44.2
PMK	N. V. Srinivasan	17,328	6.97%	−32.2
NOTA	NOTA	6,655	2.68%	New
NTK	M. Vasu	6,181	2.49%	New
IJK	R. Anandapriya	4,582	1.84%	New
Margin of victory		8,402	3.38%	−9.53%
Turnout		248,597	61.81%	−7.18%
Registered electors		402,205		
AIADMK gain from CPI(M)		Swing	-11.97%	

2011 Tamil Nadu Legislative Assembly election: Maduravoyal
Party	Candidate	Votes	%	±%
CPI(M)	G. Beem Rao	96,844	52.09%	New
PMK	K. Selvam	72,833	39.17%	New
BJP	S. Selvan	6,381	3.43%	New
IJK	D. Sivasankaran	2,256	1.21%	New
BSP	P. Yosuva	2,040	1.10%	New
Independent	K. Selvam	1,542	0.83%	New
JMM	L. Dhilbahadur	1,373	0.74%	New
Margin of victory		24,011	12.91%	
Turnout		185,925	68.99%	
Registered electors		269,513		
CPI(M) win (new seat)				
