= K. Ganapathy =

Indian politician

Member of the Tamil Nadu Legislative Assembly
- In office 12 May 2021 – 5 May 2026
- Preceded by: P. Benjamin
- Succeeded by: P. Rhevanth Charan
- Constituency: Maduravoyal

Personal details
- Party: Dravida Munnetra Kazhagam
- Spouse: G. Hemalatha
- Parent: Kannan (father)

Kannan Ganapathy is an Indian Politician Member of Legislative Assembly of Tamil Nadu. He was elected from Maduravoyal as a Dravida Munnetra Kazhagam candidate in 2021. He lost to P. Rhevanth Charan of Tamilaga Vettri Kazhagam in 2026 Tamil Nadu Legislative Assembly election.

== Electoral performance ==
Election	Party	Constituency Name	Result	Votes gained	Vote share%
2026	Dravida Munnetra Kazhagam	Maduravoyal	Lost	80,216	27.31
2021	Dravida Munnetra Kazhagam	Maduravoyal	Won	121,298	44.64
