= Rajarathinam Stadium =

Building in India

- இராஜரத்தினம் விளையாட்டு அரங்கம்
- Interactive map of Rajarathinam Stadium
- Location: Egmore, Chennai, Tamil Nadu, India
- Coordinates: 13°4′2″N 80°15′41″E
- Owner: TN Police Department, Government of Tamil Nadu
- Operator: DC AR
- Capacity: 1600
- Surface: Hard, Outdoors

Construction
- Renovated: 2009–2013

Rajarathinam Stadium is a stadium located on Marshalls Road in Egmore, Chennai, Tamil Nadu, India, and is owned by the state police department. The stadium had chiefly been used as a parade ground for police personnel.

== Pre-renovation ==
The stadium, which had been used primarily as a police parade ground, is currently under renovation. It also serves as a venue for morning walk for the locals. Before renovation, it was also used for the passing out parade for senior police officers, especially directors-general of police (DGPs) and also as a venue for the sports meets and annual day celebrations of the city schools.

== Renovation ==
The re-construction of the stadium began in 2009 with a fund allocation of ₹ 31.655 million for building the barracks and a training centre. The construction was handed over to the Tamil Nadu Police Housing Corporation (TNPHC) Limited. New facilities include a 400-metre-long track with nine lanes; an FRP-sheet-covered gallery that included offices, library, classrooms and dormitories for men and women; a VIP area with a longue, an air-conditioned viewing gallery, and rooms for commentators; four blocks of common toilets; and two blocks of attached toilets. Two types of galleries have been built—a main gallery with a plinth area of 12,000 sq ft and two additional galleries spread over 4,521 sq ft each.
