= D. Jayakumar =

Indian politician

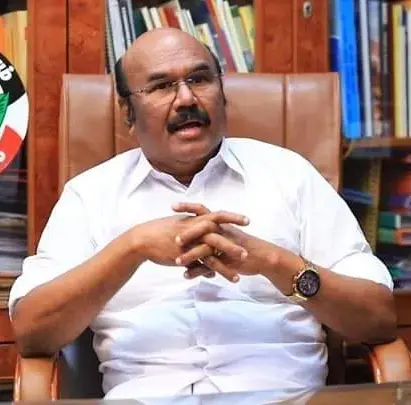
- Jayakumar during an interview

12th Speaker of the Tamil Nadu Legislative Assembly
- In office 27 May 2011 – 29 September 2012
- Deputy: P. Dhanapal
- Preceded by: R. Avudaiappan
- Succeeded by: P. Dhanapal

Minister for Fisheries and Administration reforms
- In office 23 May 2016 – 6 May 2021
- Chief Minister: Edappadi K. Palaniswami; O. Panneerselvam; J.Jayalalithaa
- Preceded by: K. A. Jayapal
- Succeeded by: Anitha R. Radhakrishnan

Minister of Finance
- In office 16 February 2017 – 21 August 2017
- Chief Minister: Edappadi K. Palaniswami
- Preceded by: O. Panneerselvam
- Succeeded by: O. Panneerselvam

Minister of Law, Information Technology & Electricity
- In office 14 May 2001 – 12 May 2006
- Chief Minister: J.Jayalalithaa; O. Panneerselvam; J.Jayalalithaa

Minister of Fisheries, Forest and Backward Class
- In office 24 June 1991 – 12 May 1996
- Chief Minister: J.Jayalalithaa

Member of Tamil Nadu Legislative Assembly
- In office 13 May 2001 – 2 May 2021
- Preceded by: R. Mathivanan
- Succeeded by: Idream R. Murthy
- Constituency: Royapuram
- In office 1991–1996
- Preceded by: R. Mathivanan
- Succeeded by: R. Mathivanan
- Constituency: Royapuram

Organizing Secretary of AIADMK
- In office 2020–Incumbent

Headquarters Secretary of the All India Anna Dravida Munnetra Kazhagam
- In office 9 June 2003 – 14 August 2006
- General Secretary: J. Jayalalithaa
- Preceded by: K. A. Sengottaiyan
- Succeeded by: K. A. Sengottaiyan

Personal details
- Born: 18 September 1960 (age 66) Royapuram, Madras, (now Chennai, Tamil Nadu), India
- Party: All India Anna Dravida Munnetra Kazhagam
- Spouse: Jayakumari
- Children: 3 including J. Jayavardhan

D. Jayakumar is an Indian politician and was a Member of the 15th Legislative Assembly of Tamil Nadu. He was the Speaker of the Tamil Nadu Legislative Assembly until his resignation on 29 September 2012. He was elected to the Tamil Nadu legislative assembly from Royapuram constituency as an Anna Dravida Munnetra Kazhagam candidate in the 1991, 2001, 2006, 2011 elections and 2016 elections for five terms. During the Tamil Nadu legislative Assembly 2021, he again contested in Royapuram Constituency and lost the election. He served in various cabinet positions starting from 1991 - Forests, Fisheries, Information Technology, Electricity and Finance. He is one among the senior leaders of AIADMK. In October 2020, he was appointed to 11 member Steering Committee of AIADMK and also serves as its Organizing Secretary. In the TN 2021 Election for Royapuram constituency, he was defeated by dmk candidate. He had represented Royapuram five times - 1991, 2001, 2006, 2011 and 2016.

== Personal ==
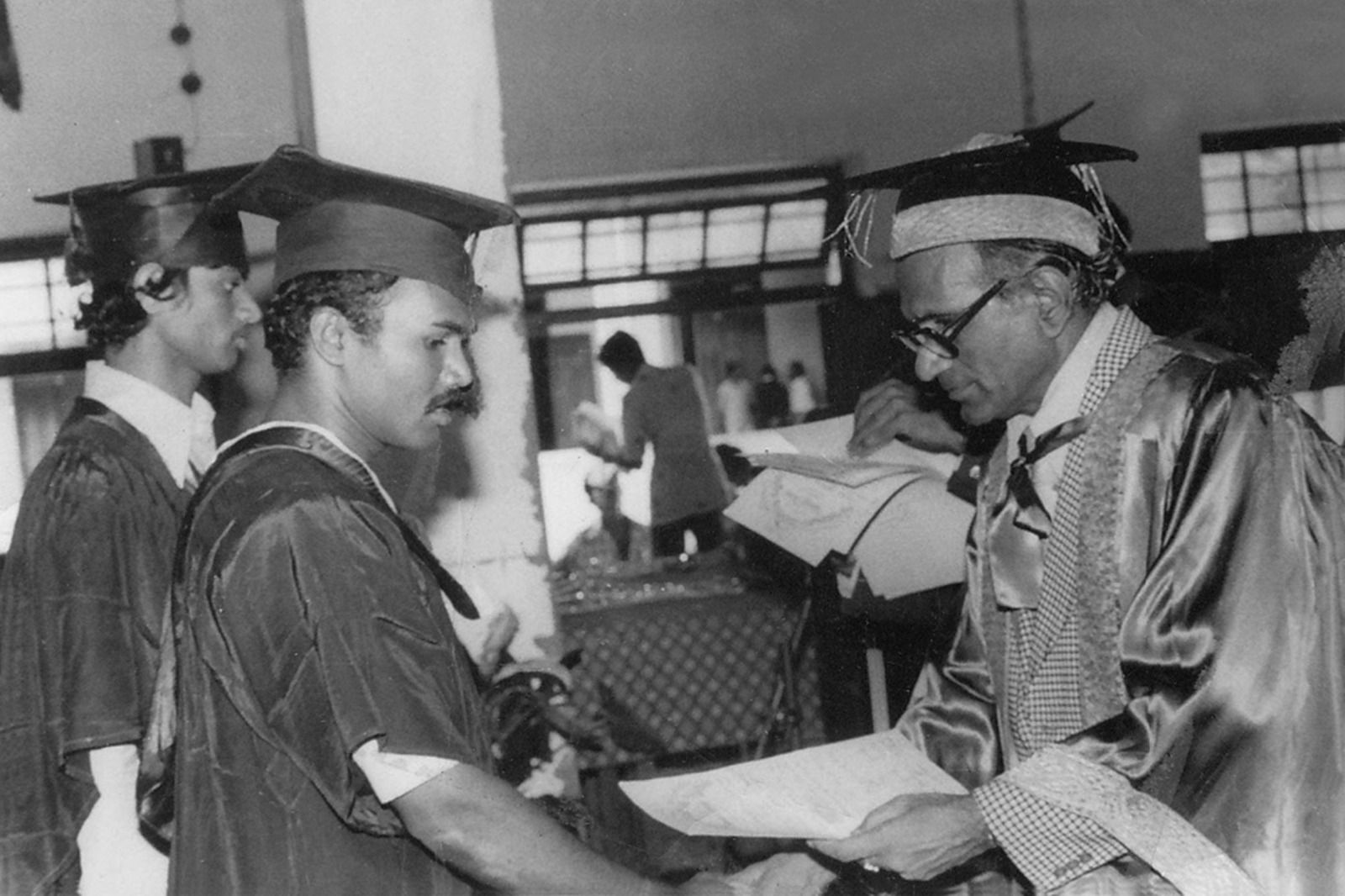
Jayakumar at his Law Degree Graduation

He is a boxer and so was his father. Other details: BSc from Pachayappas College, Chennai. BL from Madras Law College.

== Political Career ==
He joined AIADMK in 1982. He became the head of the party's MGR Youth Wing head of Royapuram area in 1987. He was appointed as AIADMK fishermen wing secretary in 1995 and became Student wing secretary in 1997. He was made the secretary of Admk North Chennai district unit.

== Elections contested ==
=== Tamil Nadu Legislative Assembly Elections ===
Elections	Constituency	Party	Result	Vote percentage	Opposition candidate	Opposition party	Opposition vote percentage
1991 Tamil Nadu Legislative Assembly election	Royapuram	AIADMK	Won	59.04	R. Mathivanan	DMK	37.77
1996 Tamil Nadu Legislative Assembly election	Royapuram	AIADMK	Lost	35.37	R. Mathivanan	DMK	57.78
2001 Tamil Nadu Legislative Assembly election	Royapuram	AIADMK	Won	56.76	K. Nargunan	DMK	39.26
2006 Tamil Nadu Legislative Assembly election	Royapuram	AIADMK	Won	53.26	S. P. Sarkunapandian	DMK	39.06
2011 Tamil Nadu Legislative Assembly election	Royapuram	AIADMK	Won	57.89	R. Manohar	INC	38.88
2016 Tamil Nadu Legislative Assembly election	Royapuram	AIADMK	Won	45.21	R.Manohar	INC	38.63
2021 Tamil Nadu Legislative Assembly election	Royapuram	AIADMK	Lost	30.46	Idream R. Murthy	DMK	53.56
2026 Tamil Nadu Legislative Assembly election	Royapuram	AIADMK	Lost	14.46	K.V. Vijay damu	TVK	46.4

== In popular culture ==
Jayakumar is mentioned by name in the film Kana Kandaen (2005).

== Gallery ==
Jayakumar in Politics

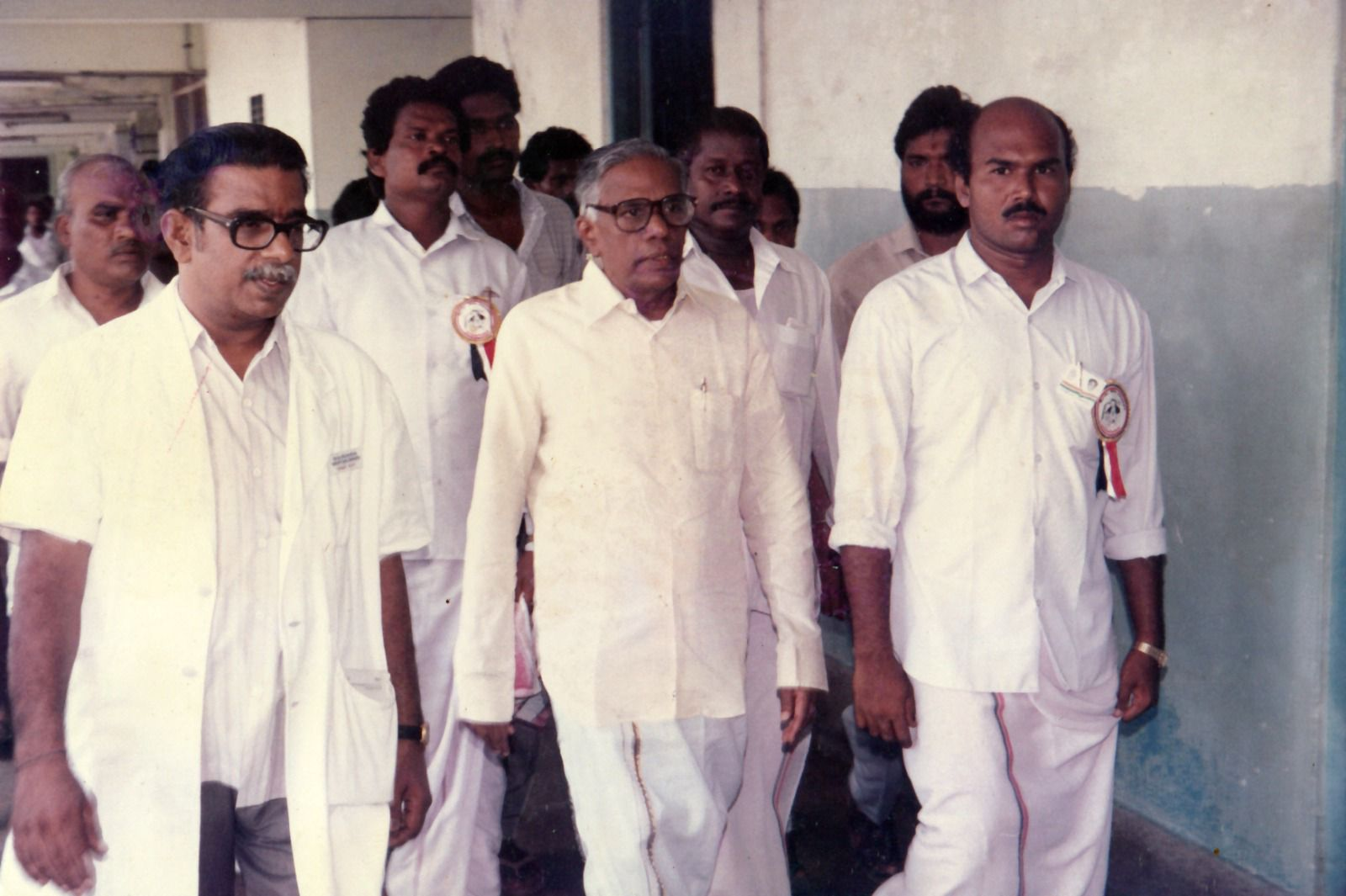
Jayakumar seen with minister R. M. Veerappan on his early years of political career.

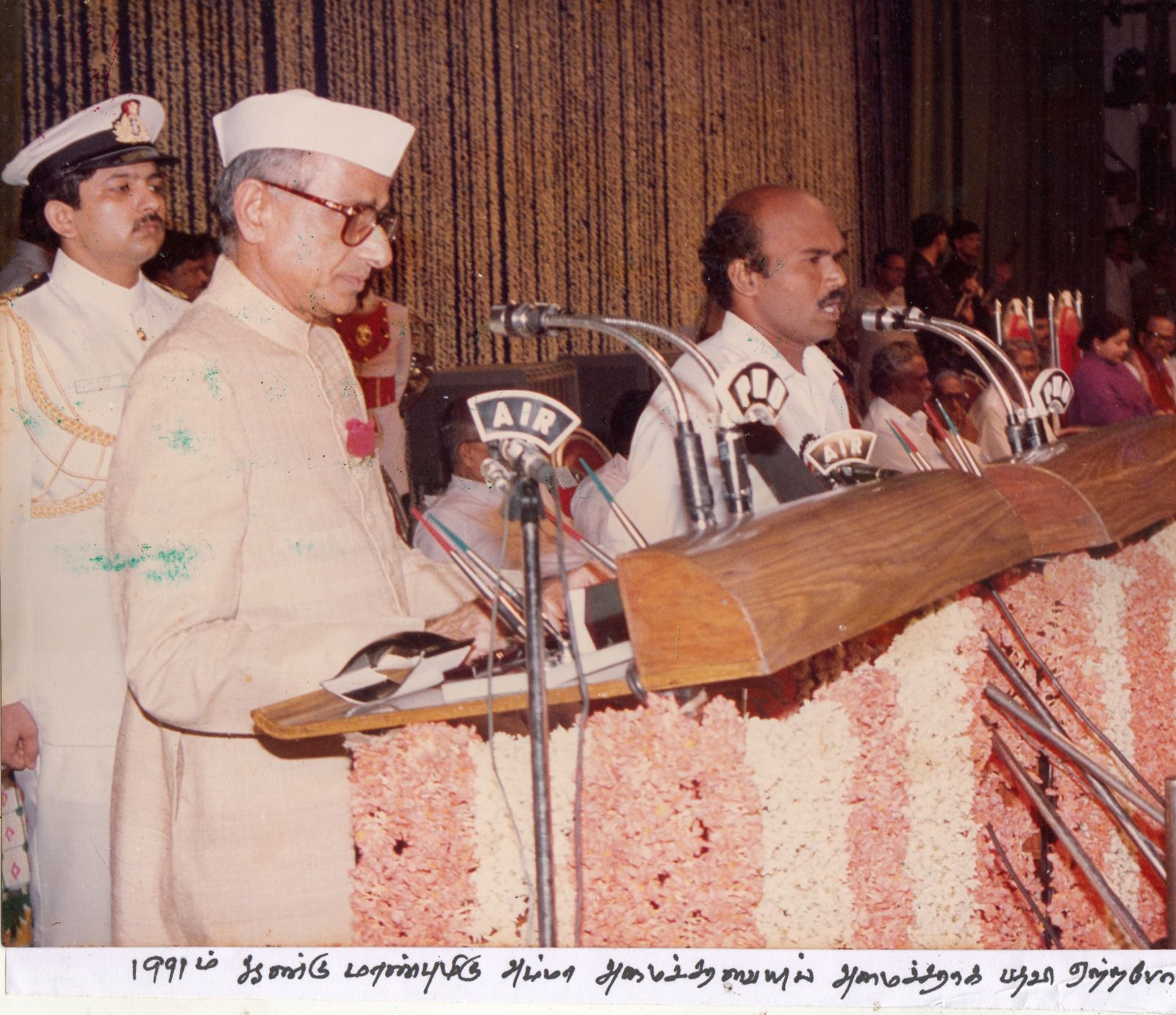
Jayakumar sworn in as first time minister in Jayalalithaa cabinet on 24 June 1991

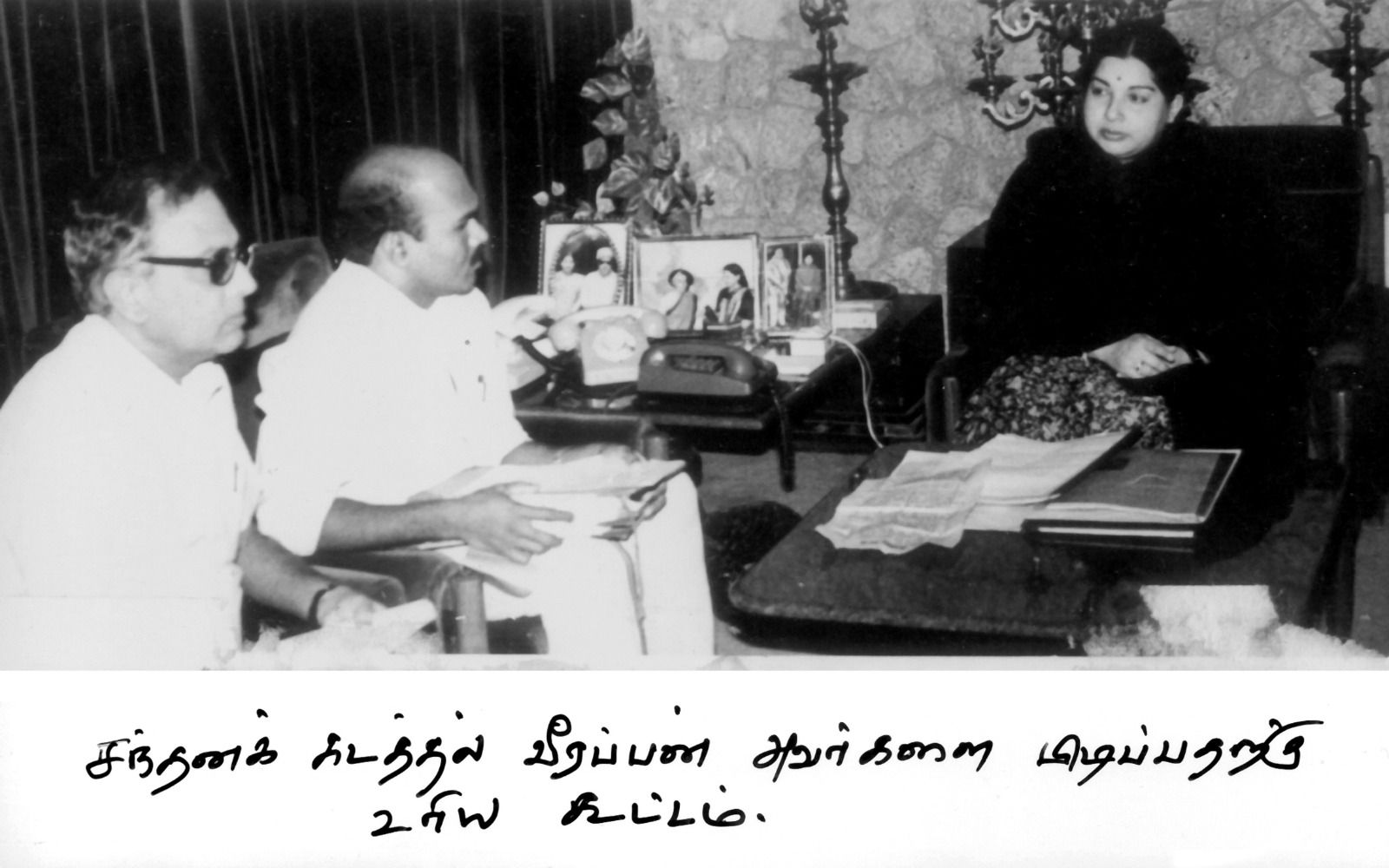
Jayakumar in discussion with Chief Minister Jayalalithaa at her residence during his first term as minister

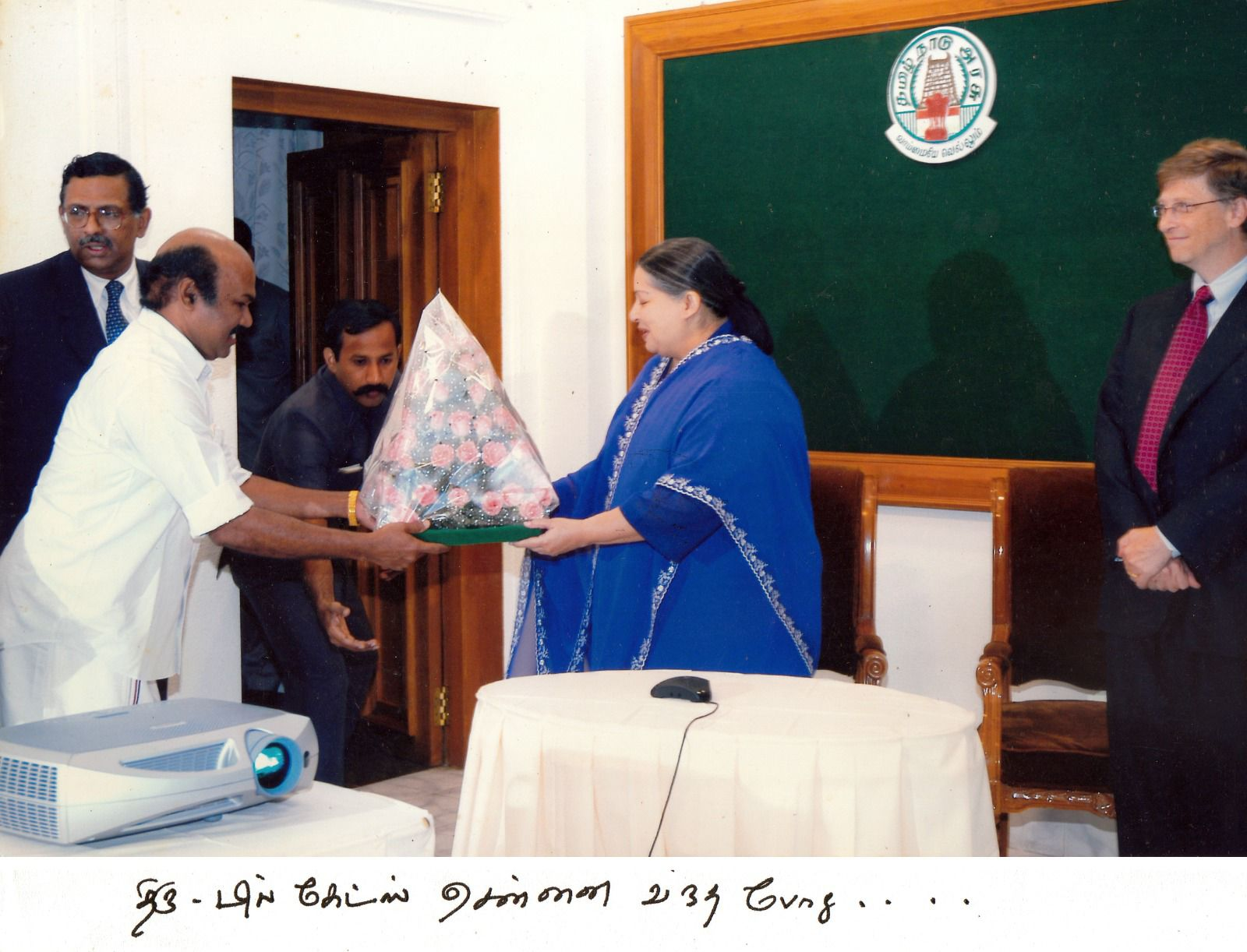
Jayakumar greets Chief Minister Jayalalithaa alongside Microsoft Chairman Bill Gates in December 2005

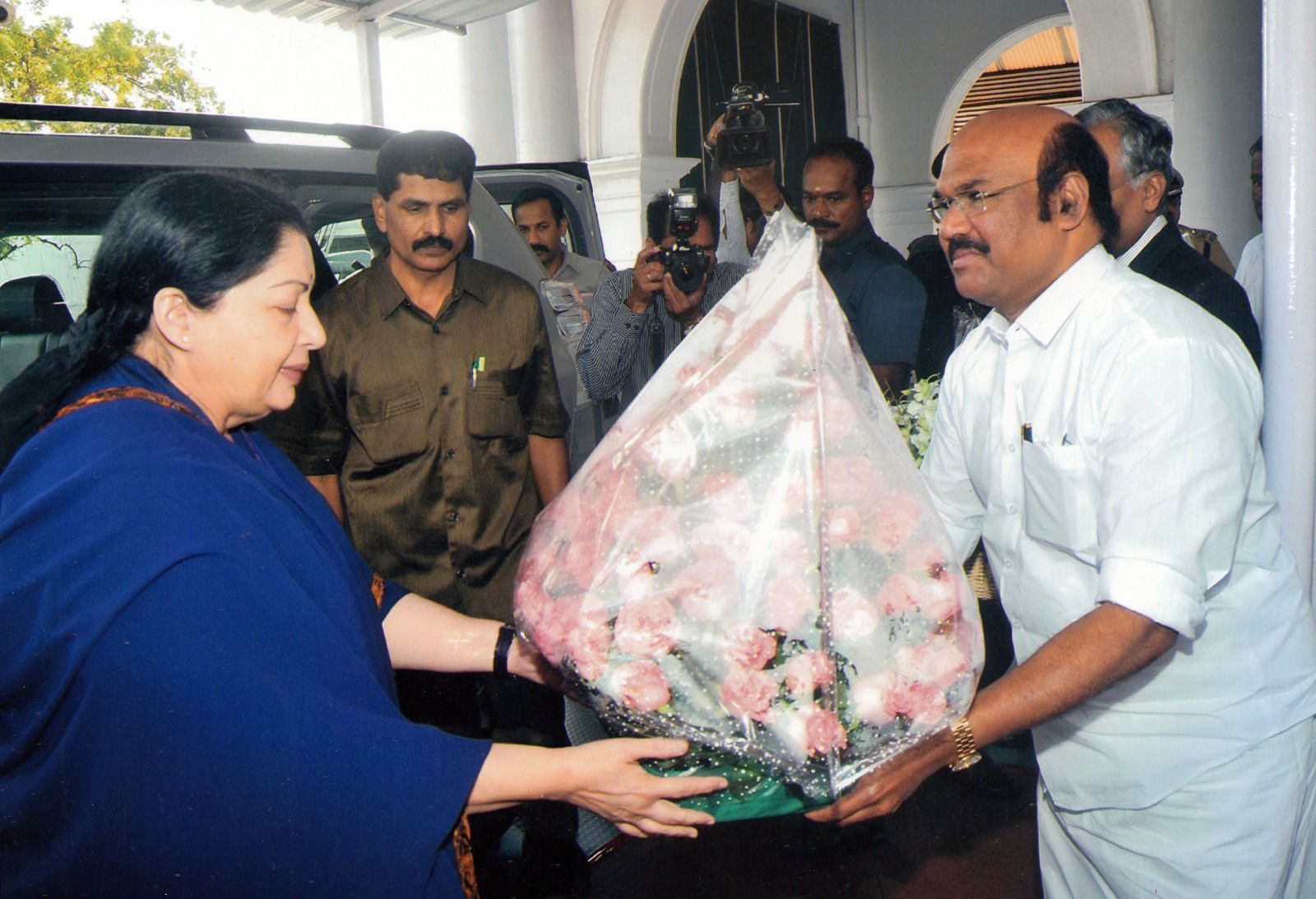
Tamil Nadu Assembly Speaker Jayakumar greets Chief Minister Jayalalithaa, who arrives at the Secretariat in January 2012

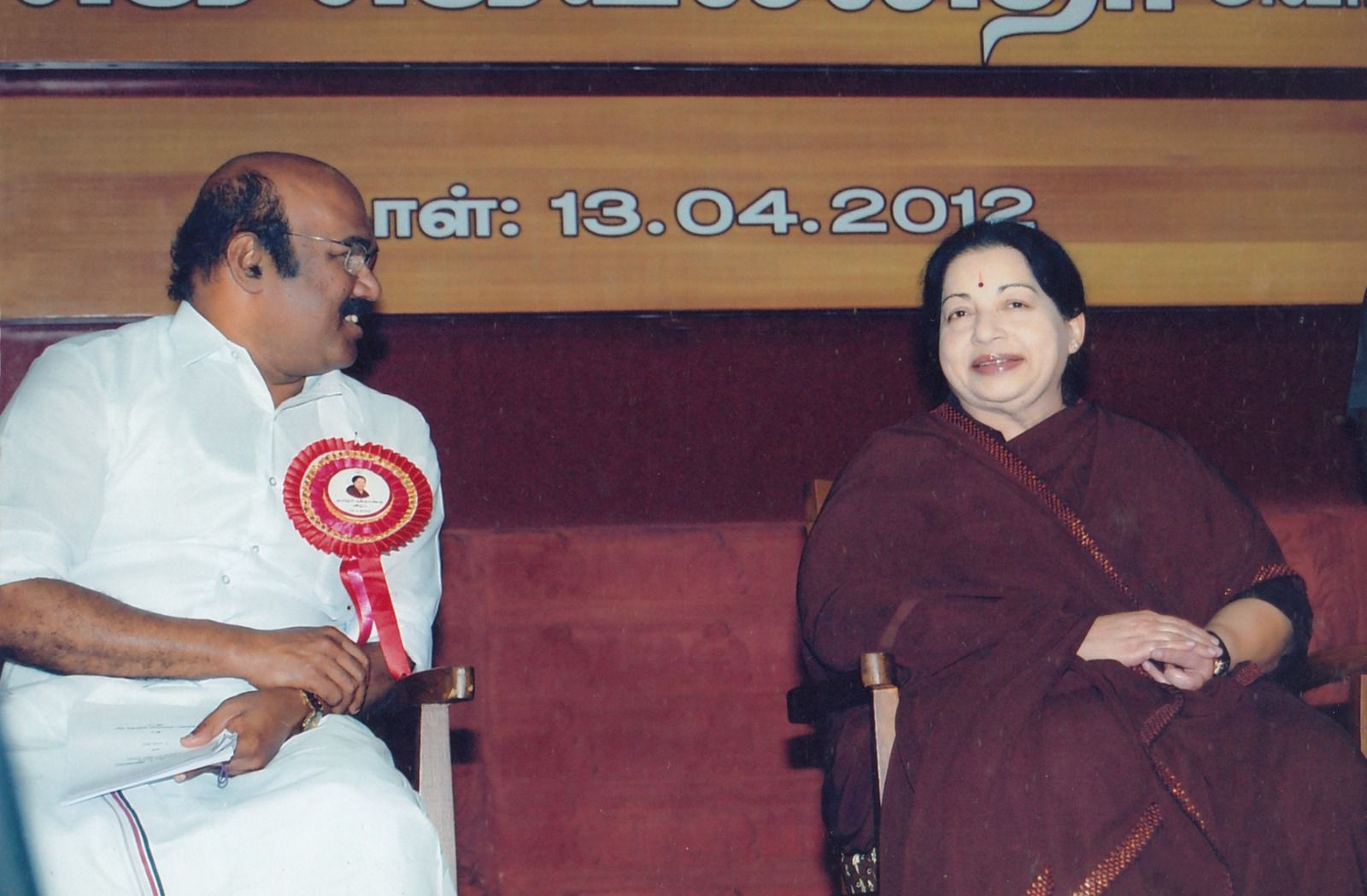
Jayakumar with Chief Minister Jayalalithaa at the celebration of the Tamil New Year in April 2012
