= Siruvallur =

Siruvallur சிறுவள்ளூர்
- Neighbourhood
- Location within Chennai Location within Tamil Nadu Location within India
- Coordinates: 13.10793°N 80.23704°E
- Country: India
- State: Tamil Nadu
- District: Chennai
- Metro: Chennai
- Elevation: 8 m (26 ft)

Languages
  - Official: Tamil
- Time zone: UTC+5:30 (IST)
- PIN: 600011
- Telephone code: 044
- Planning agency: CMDA
- City: Chennai
- Lok Sabha constituency: North Chennai
- Vidhan Sabha constituency: Kolathur
- Civic agency: Greater Chennai Corporation

Siruvallur (Tamil: சிறுவள்ளூர்), is a small neighbourhood of Perambur and a developed residential area in North Chennai, a metropolitan city in Tamil Nadu, India.

== Location ==
Siruvallur is located near Agaram, Peravallur, Venus and Perambur. It is well connected by train and bus transport. It is very close to Perambur Carriage Works Railway Station.
