= P. Rhevanth Charan =

Indian politician (born 1996)

Member of the Tamil Nadu Legislative Assembly
- Incumbent
- Assumed office May 2026
- Chief Minister: C. Joseph Vijay
- Preceded by: K. Ganapathy
- Constituency: Maduravoyal

Personal details
- Party: Tamilaga Vettri Kazhagam
- Spouse: D. Pooja Harani (m. 2024)
- Parent: R. Panneer Selvam (father)
- Relatives: Vinoj P. Selvam (brother)
- Education: Comparative & International Dispute Resolution in 2019 at Queen Mary University of London (L.L.M); Dr B.R. Ambedkar Law University, Chennai (B.A, L.L.B (Hons.))
- Occupation: Owner, Rohini SilverScreens and Theater, Koyambedu

Panneerselvam Rhevanth Charan (born 1996) is an Indian politician from Tamil Nadu. He is a member of the Tamil Nadu Legislative Assembly from Maduravoyal Assembly constituency in Chennai district representing Tamilaga Vettri Kazhagam.

== Early life and education ==
Charan is from Chennai. He is the youngest son of R. Panneer Selvam and has an elder brother Vinoj P. Selvam, who is associated with Bharatiya Janata Party of Tamil Nadu. He is married to Pooja Harani in 2024, with prominent people including Rajinikanth, union minister Hardeep Singh Puri attending his wedding. He is the owner of Rohini SilverScreens Cinema Theatre at Koyambedu. He also runs a professional consultancy service. He completed his Bachelor of Arts & Bachelor of Law (honours) in 2018 at Dr B.R. Ambedkar Law University, Chennai. Later, he did his LLM in Comparative & International Dispute Resolution in 2019 at Queen Mary University of London, United Kingdom. He declared assets worth Rs.22 crore in his affidavit to the Election Commission of India.

== Political career ==
Charan became an MLA for the first time winning the 2026 Tamil Nadu Legislative Assembly election rom Maduravoyal Assembly constituency representing Tamilaga Vettri Kazhagam. He polled 1,41,725 votes and defeated his nearest rival, K. Ganapathy of the Dravida Munnetra Kazhagam, by a margin of 61,509 votes.

=== Electoral performances ===
2026 Tamil Nadu Legislative Assembly election : Maduravoyal
Party	Candidate	Votes	%	±%
TVK	P. Rhevanth Charan	141,725	48.26	New
DMK	K. Ganapathy	80,216	27.31	▼17.33
AIADMK	P. Benjamin	54,705	18.63	New
NTK	Revathi. L	13,024	4.43	▼3.31
NOTA	None of the above	1,462	0.50	▼0.29
Margin of victory		61,509	20.94	▲9.27
Turnout		294,170	78.80	▲18.22
Total valid votes		293,692		
Registered electors		373,321		▼17.44
TVK gain from DMK		Swing	▲3.62	
