= Madavaram Assembly constituency =

State Legislative Assembly Constituency in Tamil Nadu

Coordinates: 13.15°N 80.24°E

Madhavaram
- Constituency No. 9 for the Tamil Nadu Legislative Assembly

Constituency details
- Country: India
- Region: South India
- State: Tamil Nadu
- District: Thiruvallur
- Lok Sabha constituency: Thiruvallur
- Established: 2008
- Total electors: 431,796

Member of Legislative Assembly
- 17th Tamil Nadu Legislative Assembly
- Incumbent M. L. Vijay Prabhu
- Party: TVK
- Elected year: 2026

Madhavaram is a state assembly constituency in the Thiruvallur district of Tamil Nadu, India formed after the constituency delimitation in 2008 with more than 2 lakh voters. Its State Assembly Constituency number is 9. It is included in Thiruvallur Lok Sabha constituency. It consists of areas like Mathur MMDA, Manali, Milk Colony, Ponniammedu, Madhavaram and Puzhal. It was divided from the Ambattur taluk. It is one of the 234 State Legislative Assembly Constituencies in Tamil Nadu.

== Members of the Legislative Assembly ==
Election	Member	Party
1962	R. Govindarajulu Naidu	Indian National Congress
2011	Madhavaram V. Moorthy	All India Anna Dravida Munnetra Kazhagam
2016	S. Sudharsanam	Dravida Munnetra Kazhagam
2021	S. Sudharsanam	Dravida Munnetra Kazhagam
2026	M. L. Vijay Prabhu	Tamilaga Vettri Kazhagam

Madras State

== Election results ==
Vote share of winning candidates
2021	50.04%
2016	45.43%
2011	55.69%

=== 2026 ===
2026 Tamil Nadu Legislative Assembly election : Madavaram
Party	Candidate	Votes	%	±%
TVK	M. L. Vijay Prabhu	190,462	52.61%	New
DMK	S. Sudharsanam	95,477	26.38%	▼24.03
AIADMK	Madhavaram V. Moorthy	59,290	16.38%	▼15.04
NTK	E. Krithika	12,637	3.49%	▼5.64
NOTA	None of the above	1,394	0.39%	▼0.33
Margin of victory		94,985	26.24%	▲7.25
Turnout		362,249	83.88%	▲17.20
Total valid votes		361,998		
Registered electors		431,866		▼4.97
TVK gain from DMK		Swing	▲2.20	

=== 2021 ===
2021 Tamil Nadu Legislative Assembly election : Madavaram
Party	Candidate	Votes	%	±%
DMK	S. Sudharsanam	151,485	50.41%	▲4.98
AIADMK	Madhavaram V. Moorthy	94,414	31.42%	▼8.34
NTK	R. Elumalai	27,453	9.13%	▲7.75
MNM	Ramesh	15,877	5.28%	New
AMMK	D. Dhakshnamoorthy	7,104	2.36%	New
NOTA	None of the above	2,166	0.72%	▼0.88
Margin of victory		57,071	18.99%	▲13.31
Turnout		303,051	66.68%	▼1.83
Total valid votes		300,534		
Registered electors		454,474		▲15.85
DMK hold		Swing	▲4.98	

=== 2016 ===
2016 Tamil Nadu Legislative Assembly election : Madavaram
Party	Candidate	Votes	%	±%
DMK	S. Sudharsanam	122,082	45.43%	▲6.50
AIADMK	D. Dhakshnamoorthy	106,829	39.76%	▼15.93
PMK	G. Eraviraj	14,245	5.30%	New
CPI	A. S. Kannan	9,383	3.49%	New
BJP	R. M. R. Janakiraman	5,161	1.92%	▲0.67
NOTA	None of the above	4,291	1.60%	New
NTK	R. Elumalai	3,697	1.38%	New
Margin of victory		15,253	5.68%	▼11.09
Turnout		268,760	68.51%	▲68.51
Total valid votes		268,718		
Rejected ballots		42	0.02%	
Registered electors		392,299		▲42.33
DMK gain from AIADMK		Swing	▼10.26	

=== 2011 ===
2011 Tamil Nadu Legislative Assembly election : Madavaram
Party	Candidate	Votes	%	±%
AIADMK	Madhavaram V. Moorthy	115,468	55.69%	New
DMK	N. S. Kanimozhi	80,703	38.93%	▼7.67
BJP	B. Sivakumar	2,599	1.25%	New
Independent	P. Kumaran	2,135	1.03%	New
Puratchi Bharatham	A. Ramesh	1,964	0.95%	New
BSP	N. Janakiraman	1,280	0.62%	New
Margin of victory		34,765	16.77%	▲16.38
Total valid votes		207,325		
Rejected ballots		81	0.00%	
Registered electors		275,626		▲182.28
AIADMK gain from INC		Swing	▲8.69	

=== 1962 ===
1962 Madras State Legislative Assembly election : Madavaram
Party	Candidate	Votes	%	±%
INC	R. Govindarajulu Naidu	29,896	47.00%	New
DMK	A. P. Arasu	29,646	46.60%	New
Socialist Labour	Balaram	3,364	5.29%	New
Independent	Veeraraghavan	707	1.11%	New
Margin of victory		250	0.39%	
Turnout		65,897	67.49%	
Total valid votes		63,613		
Registered electors		97,642		
INC win (new seat)				
