= M. Singaravelar Maligai =

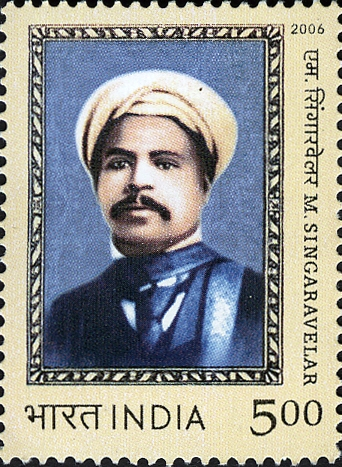
- M. Singaravelar
- Interactive map of the M. Singaravelar Maligai area

General information
- Type: Office building
- Location: Chennai, No. 62, Rajaji Salai, George Town, Chennai, Tamil Nadu - 600001, India
- Coordinates: 13.0959°N 80.2924°E
- Owner: Government of Tamil Nadu

Technical details
- Floor count: Eight
- Lifts/elevators: Four

M. Singaravelar Maaligai is a state government official building that houses Chennai district Collector's office, some state Government offices and Civil and Sessions courts, in Chennai of Tamil Nadu in India. The building was named after M. Singaravelar alias Malayapuram Singaravelu, who was a social reformer.

== Location ==
This building is located with the geographic coordinates of (13.0959°N 80.2924°E), at an altitude of about 30.52 metres (100.1 ft) above the mean sea level.

== Details ==
The building is built with eight floors. The Chennai district Collectorate occupies the fourth floor. and in general, the building itself is called as Collectorate building. The Chennai district Collector meets the public every Monday on account of public grievances day. Aadhaar Permanent Enrollment Center and the office for Chief Minister's Medical Insurance Scheme are situated at the backside (ground floor) of this building. National Informatics Center has a branch here and in the District Administrative office.

== Offices ==
The first floor is occupied by Civil and Additional Sessions Courts.

The second floor has the Office of the welfare of the District Adi Dravidiar, the office of the welfare of District Backward Class, TAHDCO and civil court.

The third floor is occupied by the Pay and Accounts Office (North).

The fourth floor has the Chennai District Collector Office, the office of the District Revenue Officer and a small meeting hall.

The fifth floor is occupied by the office of the District Revenue Officer, Stamp Office, the office of the District Public Relations Officer, the office of the P. A. to District Collector and the office of the District Informatics Center.

The sixth floor has the office of the District Social Security Scheme and the office of the issuance of the Tribal Permanent Caste Certificate.

The seventh floor is occupied by the Sub-treasury, Fort, Tondiarpet.

The eighth floor comprises the office of the District Deputy Superintendent for Stamps and an Assembly hall.
