= Vada Agaram =

Vada Agaram is one of the neighbourhoods of the city of Chennai in Tamil Nadu, India. It is located in the northern part of the city and forms a part of Egmore-Nungambakkam taluk.
