= V. Moorthy =

Indian politician

V. Moorthy is an Indian politician and was a member of the 14th Tamil Nadu Legislative Assembly from Madhavaram constituency. He represented All India Anna Dravida Munnetra Kazhagam party.

Moorthy was the Minister for Milk and Dairy Development of the Government of Tamil Nadu from November 2011.

The elections of 2016 resulted in his constituency being won by S. Sudharsanam.

== Electoral performance ==
2021 Tamil Nadu Legislative Assembly election: Madavaram
| Party | Candidate | Votes | % | ±% |
|---|---|---|---|---|
| DMK | S. Sudharsanam | 151,485 | 50.04% | +4.61 |
| AIADMK | V. Moorthy | 94,414 | 31.19% | −8.56 |
| NTK | R. Elumalai | 27,453 | 9.07% | +7.69 |
| MNM | Ramesh | 15,877 | 5.25% | New |
| AMMK | D. Dhakshnamoorthy | 7,104 | 2.35% | New |
| NOTA | Nota | 2,166 | 0.72% | −0.88 |
| Margin of victory | | 57,071 | 18.85% | 13.18% |
| Turnout | | 302,700 | 66.63% | −1.87% |
| Registered electors | | 454,327 | | |
| DMK hold | | Swing | 4.61% | |

2011 Tamil Nadu Legislative Assembly election: Madavaram
| Party | Candidate | Votes | % | ±% |
|---|---|---|---|---|
| AIADMK | V. Moorthy | 115,468 | 55.69% | New |
| DMK | N. S. Kanimozhi | 80,703 | 38.93% | New |
| BJP | B. Sivakumar | 2,599 | 1.25% | New |
| Independent | P. Kumaran | 2,135 | 1.03% | New |
| Puratchi Bharatham | A. Ramesh | 1,964 | 0.95% | New |
| BSP | N. Janakiraman | 1,280 | 0.62% | New |
| Margin of victory | | 34,765 | 16.77% | |
| Turnout | | 275,626 | 75.22% | |
| Registered electors | | 207,325 | | |
| AIADMK win (new seat) | | | | |
