= Royapuram Assembly constituency =

State Legislative Assembly Constituency in Tamil Nadu

Coordinates: 13.114°N 80.297°E

Royapuram
- Constituency No. 17 for the Tamil Nadu Legislative Assembly

Constituency details
- Country: India
- Region: South India
- State: Tamil Nadu
- District: Chennai
- Lok Sabha constituency: Chennai North
- Established: 1977
- Total electors: 159,654

Member of Legislative Assembly
- 17th Tamil Nadu Legislative Assembly
- Incumbent K. V. Vijay Damu
- Party: TVK
- Elected year: 2026

Royapuram is a legislative assembly constituency, that includes the locality of Royapuram. Its State Assembly Constituency number is 17. Royapuram Assembly constituency is a part of Chennai North Lok Sabha constituency. It is one of the 234 State Legislative Assembly Constituencies in Tamil Nadu, in India.

== Members of Legislative Assembly ==
Year	Winner	Party
1977	P. Ponnurangam	Dravida Munnetra Kazhagam
1980	P. Ponnurangam	Dravida Munnetra Kazhagam
1984	P. Ponnurangam	Dravida Munnetra Kazhagam
1989	R. Mathivanan	Dravida Munnetra Kazhagam
1991	D. Jayakumar	All India Anna Dravida Munnetra Kazhagam
1996	R. Mathivanan	Dravida Munnetra Kazhagam
2001	D. Jayakumar	All India Anna Dravida Munnetra Kazhagam
2006	D. Jayakumar	All India Anna Dravida Munnetra Kazhagam
2011	D. Jayakumar	All India Anna Dravida Munnetra Kazhagam
2016	D. Jayakumar	All India Anna Dravida Munnetra Kazhagam
2021	Idream R. Murthy	Dravida Munnetra Kazhagam
2026	K. V. Vijay Damu	Tamilaga Vettri Kazhagam

== Election results ==
Vote share of winning candidates
2026	46.4%
2021	53.56%
2016	45.21%
2011	57.89%
2006	53.26%
2001	56.76%
1996	57.78%
1991	59.04%
1989	45.95%
1984	50.26%
1980	50.31%
1977	33.54%

=== 2026 ===
2026 Tamil Nadu Legislative Assembly election: Royapuram
Party	Candidate	Votes	%	±%
TVK	K. V. Vijay Damu	59,091	46.40	New
DMK	Subair Khan	44,842	35.21	▼18.35
AIADMK	D. Jayakumar	18,420	14.46	▼16.00
NTK	S Bbabu Mailan	2,947	2.31	▼4.30
NOTA	NOTA	459	0.36	▼0.39
Margin of victory		14,249	11.19	▼11.90
Turnout		1,27,356		
Rejected ballots				
Registered electors		1,59,654		
TVK gain from DMK		Swing	▲46.40	

=== 2021 ===
2021 Tamil Nadu Legislative Assembly election: Royapuram
Party	Candidate	Votes	%	±%
DMK	Idreams Murthy	64,424	53.56	New
AIADMK	D. Jayakumar	36,645	30.46	−14.74
MNM	S. Gunasekaran	8,166	6.79	New
NTK	S. Kamali	7,953	6.61	+4.66
AMMK	C. Ramajayam	1,128	0.94	New
NOTA	NOTA	901	0.75	−1.17
Margin of victory		27,779	23.09	16.52
Turnout		120,290	62.45	−1.06
Rejected ballots		326	0.27	
Registered electors		192,617		
DMK gain from AIADMK		Swing	8.35	

=== 2016 ===
2016 Tamil Nadu Legislative Assembly election: Royapuram
Party	Candidate	Votes	%	±%
AIADMK	D. Jayakumar	55,205	45.21	−12.68
INC	R. Manohar	47,174	38.63	−0.25
SDPI	H. Syed Rafi Basha	4,345	3.56	New
BJP	M. R. Jemelaa	3,562	2.92	+1.42
TMC(M)	Biju Chacko	3,191	2.61	New
NTK	B. Ananda Raj	2,387	1.95	New
NOTA	NOTA	2,348	1.92	New
PMK	T. S. Perumal	2,126	1.74	New
Margin of victory		8,031	6.58	−12.43
Turnout		122,117	63.51	−7.07
Registered electors		192,283		
AIADMK hold		Swing	-12.68	

=== 2011 ===
2011 Tamil Nadu Legislative Assembly election: Royapuram
Party	Candidate	Votes	%	±%
AIADMK	D. Jayakumar	65,099	57.89	+4.62
INC	R. Manohar	43,727	38.88	New
BJP	Chandar (Alias) D. Chandru	1,683	1.50	+0.72
Margin of victory		21,372	19.00	4.80
Turnout		112,461	70.58	1.56
Registered electors		159,349		
AIADMK hold		Swing	4.62	

=== 2006 ===
2006 Tamil Nadu Legislative Assembly election: Royapuram
Party	Candidate	Votes	%	±%
AIADMK	D. Jayakumar	50,647	53.26	−3.5
DMK	S. P. Sarkunapandian	37,144	39.06	−0.2
DMDK	Royapuram V. Babu	5,033	5.29	New
BJP	V. C. Kumar	735	0.77	New
Margin of victory		13,503	14.20	−3.30
Turnout		95,090	69.02	18.97
Registered electors		137,772		
AIADMK hold		Swing	-3.50	

=== 2001 ===
2001 Tamil Nadu Legislative Assembly election: Royapuram
Party	Candidate	Votes	%	±%
AIADMK	D. Jayakumar	44,465	56.76	+21.39
DMK	K. Nargunan	30,753	39.26	−18.52
MDMK	M. M. Gopinathan	1,772	2.26	−1.33
Independent	S. Dhanraj	430	0.55	New
Margin of victory		13,712	17.50	−4.90
Turnout		78,335	50.05	−10.94
Registered electors		156,528		
AIADMK gain from DMK		Swing	-1.01	

=== 1996 ===
1996 Tamil Nadu Legislative Assembly election: Royapuram
Party	Candidate	Votes	%	±%
DMK	R. Mathivanan	44,893	57.78	+20.01
AIADMK	D. Jayakumar	27,485	35.37	−23.67
MDMK	S. Mohan	2,793	3.59	New
PMK	V. Gnanam	1,201	1.55	New
BJP	Nannuri Venkateswara Rao	675	0.87	−0.23
Margin of victory		17,408	22.40	1.13
Turnout		77,702	60.99	1.58
Registered electors		130,238		
DMK gain from AIADMK		Swing	-1.27	

=== 1991 ===
1991 Tamil Nadu Legislative Assembly election: Royapuram
Party	Candidate	Votes	%	±%
AIADMK	D. Jayakumar	46,218	59.04	+51.09
DMK	R. Mathivanan	29,565	37.77	−8.18
PMK	T. S. Perumal	1,278	1.63	New
BJP	V. Narasimman	857	1.09	New
Margin of victory		16,653	21.27	6.95
Turnout		78,278	59.41	−10.66
Registered electors		133,943		
AIADMK gain from DMK		Swing	13.10	

=== 1989 ===
1989 Tamil Nadu Legislative Assembly election: Royapuram
Party	Candidate	Votes	%	±%
DMK	R. Mathivanan	37,742	45.95	−4.31
Independent	K. Arumugaswamy	25,976	31.62	New
INC	V. Ramani Bai	8,681	10.57	New
AIADMK	R. Somasundaram	6,532	7.95	New
Independent	A. Veerasamy	1,325	1.61	New
Independent	M. S. Madasamy	432	0.53	New
Margin of victory		11,766	14.32	12.73
Turnout		82,142	70.07	0.73
Registered electors		118,588		
DMK hold		Swing	-4.31	

- Due to the split after MGR's death, R. Somasundaram, was part of ADK (Janaki), and not part of the other splinter group ADK (Jayalalitha).

=== 1984 ===
1984 Tamil Nadu Legislative Assembly election: Royapuram
Party	Candidate	Votes	%	±%
DMK	P. Punnurangam	40,727	50.26	−0.05
GKC	K. Rajan	39,432	48.66	New
Margin of victory		1,295	1.60	0.34
Turnout		81,031	69.34	5.05
Registered electors		118,621		
DMK hold		Swing	-0.05	

- K. Rajan belonged to the Gandhi Kamaraj National Congress.

=== 1980 ===
1980 Tamil Nadu Legislative Assembly election: Royapuram
Party	Candidate	Votes	%	±%
DMK	P. Ponnurangam	37,390	50.31	+16.77
CPI	D. Pandian	36,455	49.05	New
Margin of victory		935	1.26	−0.95
Turnout		74,319	64.30	12.87
Registered electors		116,630		
DMK hold		Swing	16.77	

=== 1977 ===
1977 Tamil Nadu Legislative Assembly election: Royapuram
Party	Candidate	Votes	%	±%
DMK	P. Ponnurangam	24,217	33.54	New
AIADMK	M. Raji	22,626	31.34	New
JP	V. Ramani Bai	17,456	24.18	New
INC	P. Thangarajan	6,742	9.34	New
Independent	K. Salappan	582	0.81	New
Margin of victory		1,591	2.20	
Turnout		72,194	51.43	
Registered electors		141,692		
DMK win (new seat)				
