= Egmore court complex =

Egmore Court Complex is a group of Municipal Magistrate Courts that were built in the Egmore area of Chennai by the British in 1916.

The court complex consists of the Chief metropolitan magistrate court 1, Additional CMM court 1, economic offences wing court 2, sub judge level courts 2, judicial magistrate courts 6, Chennai Corporation courts (Allikulam) 2 and mobile courts 2. In 2015, the Public Works Department undertook the renovation work of the court complex but the process started only in 2017 with an expected time of completion in the same year. The technical assistance for the restoration was given by the Safety for Heritage Structures.

The deadline for completion was then extended to 2018 since the Public Works Department reported more damage than expected. It was not launched immediately after renovation because of the model court of conduct for the Lok Sabha elections.

The court complex was finally inaugurated in December 2018. During the time of renovation the courts functioned at Lily Pond Complex.

== See also ==
- Sessions Court
- District Courts of Delhi
