= Adayalampattu =

Locality in India

Coordinates: 13°03′07″N 80°08′45″E

Adayalampattu is a locality in the Thiruvallur district of Tamil Nadu, India, situated within the Poonamallee Tehsil.

It is a suburban neighbourhood, part of the Chennai metropolitan area. It is known for its residential properties and is in proximity to other areas like Vanagaram and Porur.

== Potential merger ==
Despite being in close proximity to Chennai, Adayalampattu suffers from a lack of basic infrastructure. Essential amenities like proper roads, effective drainage systems, and a reliable water supply are missing. The residents of Adayalampattu hope that merging their area with the Greater Chennai Corporation will bring the much-needed infrastructure improvements, making their facilities comparable to other parts of the city.
