= Women's and Children's Hospital =

Women's and Children's Hospital may refer to:

== Asia ==
- Danat Al Emarat Women and Children's Hospital, in Abu Dhabi, UAE
- KK Women's and Children's Hospital, in Singapore
- Rajiv Gandhi Government Women and Children's Hospital, in Puducherry, India
- West China Women's and Children's Hospital, in Chengdu, Sichuan, China

== Other regions ==
- East Bardera Mothers and Children's Hospital, in Gedo, Somalia
- Mater Women's and Children's Hospital, in Queensland, Australia
- University of Missouri Women's and Children's Hospital, in Columbia, Missouri, USA
- Wirral Women and Children's Hospital, in Merseyside, England, UK
- Women's and Children's Hospital (Adelaide), in Adelaide, South Australia, Australia
- Women and Children's Hospital of Buffalo, in Buffalo, New York, USA
