= S. Sudharsanam =

Indian politician

Member of the Tamil Nadu Legislative Assembly
- Incumbent
- Assumed office 16 May 2016
- Preceded by: V. Moorthy
- Constituency: Madavaram

Personal details
- Party: Dravida Munnetra Kazhagam
- Spouse: S. Shanthi
- Children: S. A Sreenivasan
- Parent: K. Sundaram
- Education: Dr. Ambedkar Government Law College, Chennai
- Occupation: Advocate

Sundaram Sudharsanam is an Indian politician and a Member of Legislative Assembly of Tamil Nadu. He was elected from Madavaram as a Dravida Munnetra Kazhagam candidate in 2021.

== Electoral performance ==
Election	Party	Constituency Name	Result	Votes gained	Vote share%
2021	Dravida Munnetra Kazhagam	Madavaram	Won	151,485	50.04%
2016	Dravida Munnetra Kazhagam	Madavaram	Won	122,082	45.43%
