= P. Benjamin =

Indian politician

Cabinet Minister Government of Tamil Nadu
- In office 29 August 2016 – 7 May 2021
- Minister: Minister of Rural Industries, Cottage Industries, Small Industries, Tamil Nadu Urban Habitat Development Board.
- Chief Minister: J. Jayalalithaa
- In office 23 May 2016 – 29 August 2016
- Minister: Minister for School Education; Government of Tamil Nadu
- Chief Minister: J. Jayalalithaa

Member of the Tamil Nadu Legislative Assembly
- In office 19 May 2016 – 7 May 2021

Personal details
- Born: 1 June 1969 (age 57) Ayanambakkam, Chennai, Tamil Nadu India
- Party: Dravida Munnetra Kazhagam
- Other political affiliations: All India Anna Dravida Munnetra Kazhagam
- Occupation: Politician

P. Benjamin is an Indian politician in Assembly of Tamil Nadu 15th Tamil Nadu Legislative Assembly. He was elected from the Maduravoyal constituency as a candidate of the All India Anna Dravida Munnetra Kazhagam.He was expelled from the AIADMK and later joined the Dravida Munnetra Kazhagam in june 2026.

== Electoral performance ==
2021 Tamil Nadu Legislative Assembly election : Maduravoyal
| Party | Candidate | Votes | % | ±% |
|---|---|---|---|---|
| DMK | K. Ganapathy | 121,298 | 44.64 | New |
| AIADMK | P. Benjamin | 89,577 | 32.97 | ▼7.15 |
| MNM | S. Padma Priya | 33,401 | 12.29 | New |
| NTK | G. Ganeshkumar | 21,045 | 7.74 | ▲5.25 |
| AMMK | E. Lucky Murugan | 2,660 | 0.98 | New |
| NOTA | None of the above | 2,146 | 0.79 | ▼1.89 |
| Margin of victory | | 31,721 | 11.67 | ▲8.29 |
| Turnout | | 273,951 | 60.58 | ▼1.26 |
| Total valid votes | | 271,724 | | |
| Registered electors | | 452,195 | | ▲12.43 |
| DMK gain from AIADMK | | Swing | ▲4.52 | |

2016 Tamil Nadu Legislative Assembly election : Maduravoyal
| Party | Candidate | Votes | % | ±% |
|---|---|---|---|---|
| AIADMK | P. Benjamin | 99,739 | 40.12 | New |
| INC | R. Rajesh | 91,337 | 36.74 | New |
| CPI(M) | G. Beem Rao | 19,612 | 7.89 | ▼44.20 |
| PMK | N. V. Srinivasan | 17,328 | 6.97 | ▼32.20 |
| NOTA | None of the above | 6,655 | 2.68 | New |
| NTK | M. Vasu | 6,181 | 2.49 | New |
| IJK | R. Anandapriya | 4,582 | 1.84 | ▲0.63 |
| Margin of victory | | 8,402 | 3.38 | ▼9.53 |
| Turnout | | 248,719 | 61.84 | ▲61.84 |
| Total valid votes | | 248,597 | | |
| Rejected ballots | | 122 | 0.05 | |
| Registered electors | | 402,205 | | ▲49.23 |
| AIADMK gain from CPI(M) | | Swing | ▼11.97 | |
