= R. Mathivanan =

Indian politician

R. Mathivanan is an Indian politician and former Member of the Legislative Assembly of Tamil Nadu. He was elected to the Tamil Nadu legislative assembly from Royapuram constituency as a Dravida Munnetra Kazhagam candidate in the 1989 and 1996 elections.
