= Idream R. Murthy =

Indian politician

Member of the Tamil Nadu Legislative Assembly
- In office 2 May 2021 – 4 May 2026
- Preceded by: D. Jayakumar
- Constituency: Royapuram

Personal details
- Party: Dravida Munnetra Kazhagam
- Spouse: M. Maragatham
- Children: Rishikesh Sriram Murthy; Ragul Priyadarshan Murthy
- Parent: P. Ramar (father)

Idream Ramar Murthy is an Indian politician and Member of Legislative Assembly of Tamil Nadu. He was elected from Royapuram as a Dravida Munnetra Kazhagam candidate in 2021.

== Electoral performance ==
2021 Tamil Nadu Legislative Assembly election: Royapuram
Party	Candidate	Votes	%	±%
DMK	Idreams Murthy	64,424	53.56	New
AIADMK	D. Jayakumar	36,645	30.46	−14.74
MNM	S. Gunasekaran	8,166	6.79	New
NTK	S. Kamali	7,953	6.61	+4.66
AMMK	C. Ramajayam	1,128	0.94	New
NOTA	NOTA	901	0.75	−1.17
Margin of victory		27,779	23.09	16.52
Turnout		120,290	62.45	−1.06
Rejected ballots		326	0.27	
Registered electors		192,617		
DMK gain from AIADMK		Swing	8.35	
