= Ayanavaram taluk =

Taluk of the village in Chennai

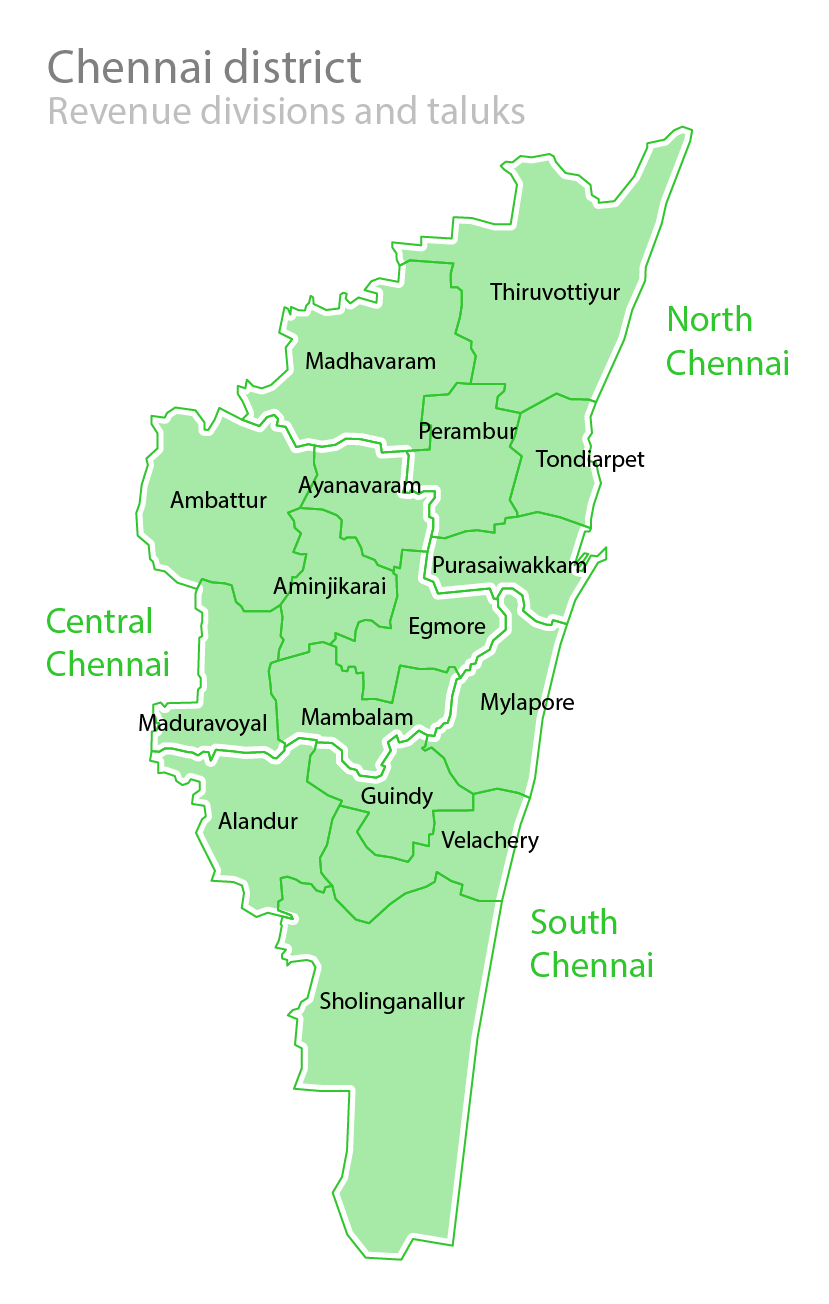

Ayanavaram taluk is a taluk of the village in Chennai in the Indian state of Tamil Nadu. It was formed in December 2013 from parts of the erstwhile Perambur-Purasawalkam taluk. It comprises the neighbourhoods of Ayanavaram, Kolathur and Peravallur.

Perambur-Purasawalkam taluk

1. Ayanavaram Firka: Aynavaram (Part 1)
2. Konnur Firka: Ayanavaram (Part 2), Konnur, Mallikaicheri
3. Peravallur Firka: Chinna Sembarambakkam
