= Ambattur taluk =

Taluk of Chennai district in Tamil Nadu, India

Ambattur
- Taluk
- Interactive map of Ambattur
- Coordinates: 13.101465°N 80.158997°E
- Country: India
- State: Tamil Nadu
- District: Chennai

Area
  - Total: 40.36 km^{2} (15.58 sq mi)

Population (2011)
  - Total: 924,474
  - Density: 22,910/km^{2} (59,330/sq mi)

Ambattur taluk is a taluk of Chennai district of the Indian state of Tamil Nadu. Its headquarters are the neighbourhood of Ambattur. This taluk was created from a division of Ponneri taluk, Tiruvallur district. On 4 January 2018, Chennai district was expanded by annexing Ambattur taluk. The RTO code for Ambattur taluk is TN-13.

- The revenue villages in Ambattur taluk are :
1. Ambattur Firka: Ambattur, Athipet, Kakapallam, Mannur, Mogappair, Padi, Adayalampattu
2. Korattur Firka: Kallikuppam, Korattur, Menambedu, Oragadam, Pattravakkam

== Demographics ==
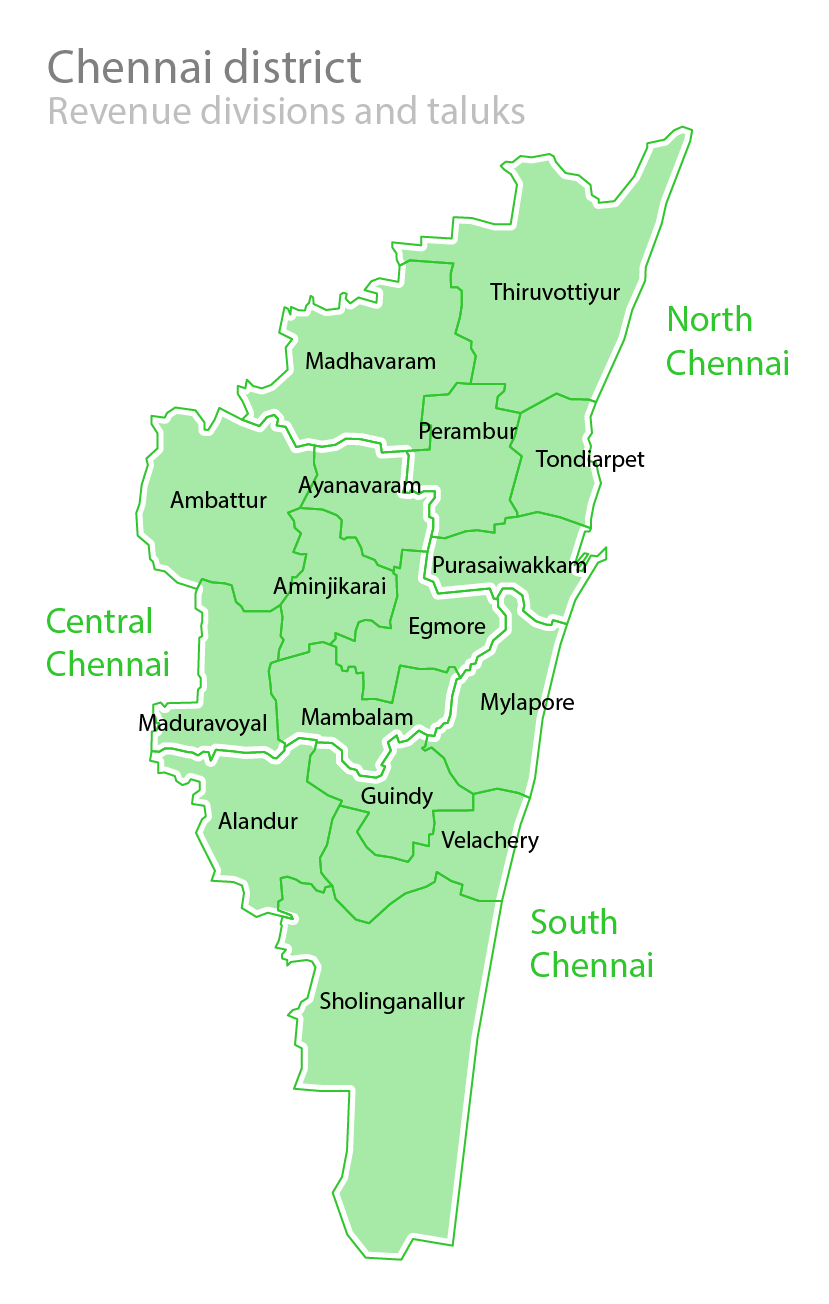
Chennai District

According to the 2011 census, the taluk of Ambattur had a population of 924,474 out of which 469,137 are males and 455,337 are females. There were 971 women for every 1,000 men. The taluk had a literacy rate of 81.9%. Child population in the age group below 6 years were 45,980 males and 43,831 females.
