= Egmore taluk =

Taluk of the city district of Chennai

Coordinates: 13.078°N 80.259°E

Egmore taluk is a taluk of the city district of Chennai in the Indian state of Tamil Nadu. It was formed in December 2013 from parts of the Egmore-Nungambakkam taluk. It comprises the neighbourhoods of Egmore and Nungambakkam.

Egmore-Nungambakkam taluk

1. Egmore Firka: Egmore South/Egmore(Part 2)
2. Kilpauk Firka: Egmore North/Egmore (Part 1)
3. Nungambakkam Firka: Nungambakkam
4. Villivakkam Firka: Puliyur
