= Parks in Chennai =

Zone	Tree cover (km^{2}) (as of 2018)
Tiruvottiyur	2.47
Manali	4.26
Madhavaram	5.42
Tondiarpet	1.82
Royapuram	2.79
Thiru-Vi-Ka Nagar	3.3
Ambattur	4.82
Anna Nagar	5.28
Teynampet	5.83
Kodambakkam	3.87
Valasaravakkam	2.6
Alandur	2.69
Adyar	12.06
Perungudi	1.9
Sholinganallur	5.13
Total	64.06

As of 2019, there are 632 parks in Chennai City, including 142 parks in the north zone, 224 in the central zone, and 266 in the south zone. They range in size from 700 square metres to 5,000 square metres. A couple of the parks, including the Anna Nagar Tower Park, are spread across acres. In 2018, the city's green cover was estimated to be 14.9 percent, up from an estimated 4.5 percent in 2011. The per capita green cover of the city has been estimated at 8.5 square meters, as against the World Health Organization recommendation of 9 square meters of green cover per capita in cities. The city lost around 100,000 trees in December 2016 because of Cyclone Vardah. As of 2018, the city's tree cover is estimated to be around 64.06 sq km. This is just over 15 percent of the entire city. The most dominant species of trees in the city are copper pod, Indian beech, neem, gulmohar, raintree, and tropical almond. The overall extent of open space in the city is 34.58 km^{2}. In all, the city has 121 species of trees belonging to 94 genera and 42 families. Teynampet zone remains the most diverse with 68 species, and Manali zone with just 38 species is the least. With 51 parks, Adyar remains the zone with the highest number of parks in the city, and Tiruvottiyur zone scores the least with only 4 parks. The share of Chennai's greenspace is dominated by the Guindy National Park, with an area of 2.71 sq km, which covers a vast area south of the Adyar River.

As of December 2014, the city had about 396 parks. Until 2011, the seven zones of the old corporation limits had about 260 public parks, 154 traffic islands and 103 centre median parks, maintained by the parks department of the Corporation of Chennai, many of which suffer poor maintenance. Public parks include 88 notified parks, 73 park sites in extended areas, and more than 100 open spaces that have been earmarked for recreation purposes. The eight zones in the newly added areas of the city have about 265 locations that have been identified for development of new parks. The largest among the parks in the city is the 358-acre Tholkappia Poonga, developed to restore the fragile ecosystem of the Adyar estuary.

Chennai's greenspace is further augmented by a network of open spaces containing forests, prairies, wetlands, canals, streams, and lakes that are set aside as natural areas along the city's periphery.

In pre-Independence days, the ceiling on the number of permanent workers for maintenance of city parks was fixed at 350. This has not been revised till date.

== Water requirement ==
The average amount of water required to maintain the parks in the city is 5 litres per square metre, which averages to about 5,000 litres per park.

== Increase in numbers ==
Until 2011, there had been 260 parks in the city. In the following year, 200 new parks were proposed. Eighty-seven of these were opened in January 2014 and the rest are nearing completion as of July 2014. By December 2014, there were about 396 parks in the city.

In July 2014, the Chennai Corporation identified more than 440 open space reserves (OSR) to create 100 new parks in the city. The Corporation hopes to have at least 560 parks in the city by March 2015. However, this number would still remain way lower than that of Delhi (1,500), Mumbai (1,300), Bangalore (721) and Hyderabad, India (709).

== List of parks ==
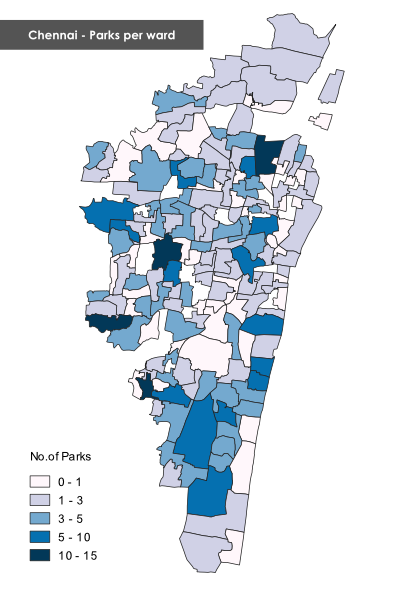
Map showing the number of parks in each ward of Chennai Corporation Area

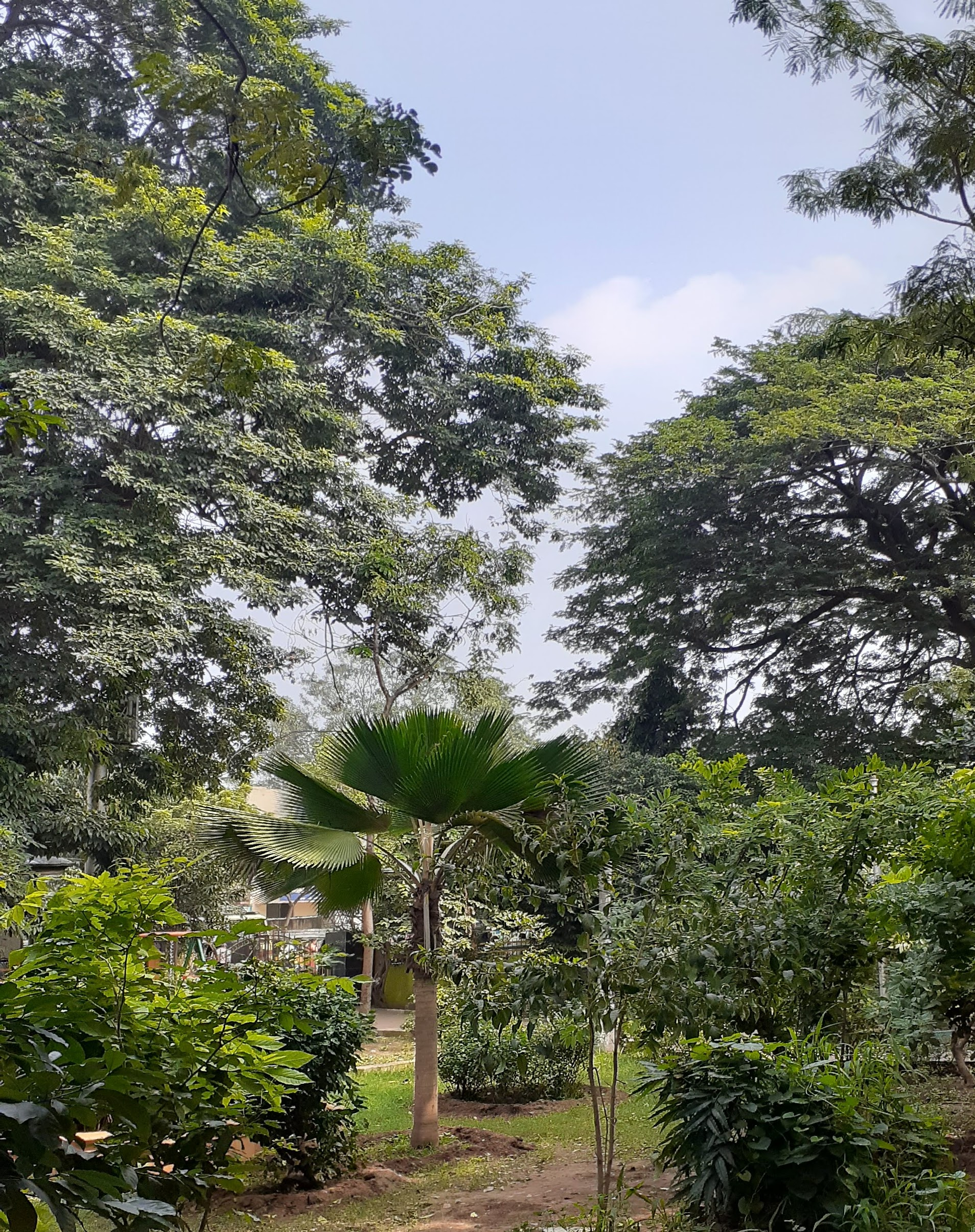
Trees and Plants in Venus Park at Perambur, Chennai

- Anna Nagar Tower Park, 15.35 acres (6.21 hectares)
- Dr. Annie Besant Park
- Arignar Anna Zoological Park, 1,490 acres (600 hectares)
- Ashok Nagar Park
- Bogun Villa Park
- BPC Park
- Chennai Corporation Park, Periyar Nagar, Perambur
- Chetput Aeri Park, 15 acres (6.1 hectares)
- G Block Park
- Gandhi Park
- Gill Nagar Park
- Guindy National Park, 700 acres (282 ha (2.82 km^{2}))
- Kodambakkam High Road Park
- Haddows Road Park
- Independence Day Park
- Indira Nagar Park
- Jeeva Park
- Jeeva Park, Ayanavaram
- Journalist Colony Park
- Kalaignar Karunanidhi Park
- Kennedy Square Park, Perambur
- KKR Avenue Park, Perambur
- Labour Colony Park
- Maadi Poonga
- Madhavaram Botanical Garden, 28 acres (11 hectares; 0.11 square kilometres)
- Manali Lakeside Park
- Mathur MMDA Park, 2.5 acres (1.0 hectare; 0.010 square kilometres)
- May Day Park, 14.5 acres (5.9 hectares)
- Mayor Sundararao Park
- Mugaliwakkam Park, 5,211 square metres (1.288 acres) (0.52 hectares)
- My Ladye's Park
- Nageshwara Rao Park, 4 acres (1.6 hectares)
- Natesan Park, 4 acres (1.6 hectares)
- Nehru Park
- Nesapakkam Park
- Panagal Park, 8 acres (3.2 hectares)
- People's Park
- Perambur Flyover Park
- Rajiv Gandhi Park, Mettupalayam, Perambur
- Sathyavani Muthu Nagar Park
- Secretariat Colony Park
- Secretariat Park, 18.5 acres (7.5 hectares)
- Semmozhi Poonga, 20 acres (8.1 hectares)
- Shenoy Nagar Park, 8.8 acres (3.6 hectares)
- Sivan Park
- Surya Narayana Park
- Thiru Nagar Park
- Thiru Vi Ka Park, 9 acres (3.6 hectares)
- Thiruvalluvar Park, Velachery
- Tholkappia Poonga, 358 acres (145 ha (1.45 km^{2}))
- Tiruvallurvar Nagar First Avenue Park
- Turn Bulls Road Park
- Valluvar Kottam Park
- Vasuki Park, Kodungaiyur
- Venus Park, Paper Mills road, Gopal colony, Perambur.
- Kalaignar Centenary Park, Cathedral road, Gopalapuram

== See also ==
- Geography of Chennai
