= Mathur MMDA Park =

Urban park in Chennai, India

- Interactive map of Mathur MMDA Park
- Type: Urban park
- Location: Mathur MMDA, Chennai, India
- Coordinates: 13.17240°N 80.24788°E
- Area: 2.5 acres (1.0 ha; 0.010 km^{2})
- Created: 2012
- Designer: CMDA
- Manager: Greater Chennai Corporation
- Open: 21 September 2016; 10 years ago
- Status: Opened

Mathur MMDA Park, is an urban park in the neighbourhood of Mathur MMDA, Chennai.

== History ==
When CMDA started housing layout in Mathur Village in early 1990s, the layout has allocated the land to create a park, but till 2011, the place allocated for park is misused as a dumpyard by Mathur Village Panchayat, after the merger of Mathur Village Panchayat with Greater Chennai Corporation in October 2011, the place was cleaned to create a park and the construction of the park begin in late 2012. On 21 September 2016 the Chief Minister of Tamil Nadu, J. Jayalalithaa inaugurated the park through video conferencing.

== Location ==
Mathur MMDA Park is located in Mathur MMDA near the Mathur MMDA bus terminal, in the junction of 2nd Main Road and 3rd Cross Street.

== The park ==
The park covers an area of 2.5 acres. The park includes a skating rink, play area, a warm-up arena, 8-shaped walking paths, pebble-filled walking path, a meditation hall, etc. This park is one of the top 10 largest park in Chennai and largest park in North Chennai.

== Near By Attractions ==
- Madhavaram Botanical Garden
- Aavin Goodness Illam
- Mathur Lake
- TANUVAS

== See also ==
- Parks in Chennai
