= A. L. Srinivasan =

Indian film producer (1923–1977)

- Born: 23 November 1923; Sirukoodalpatti Sivaganga District Now, (Old Ramanathapuram District), India
- Died: 30 July 1977 (aged 53)
- Occupation: Film producer
- Spouses: Azhagammai Aachi (m.1948-1977); S. Varalakshmi (m.1952-1977)
- Children: 4
- Relatives: Kannadasan (brother)

A. L. Srinivasan (23 November 1923 – 30 July 1977) was an Indian film producer who is known for having introduced many directors in Tamil cinema.

== Early life ==
Srinivasan was the sixth child in a family of ten children. Kannappa Chettiar, Gandhimathi, Muthammal, Gnanaambal, Sswarnammaal, Kannadasan and Sivakami are the siblings of Srinivasan.

== Career ==
Starting his career as a financier, Srinivasan slowly graduated to become a distributor and producer. He also owned film studios in Madras and Coimbatore. As a producer, he is credited for having introduced directors such as A. Bhimsingh, Puttanna Kanagal, K. S. Gopalakrishnan, Aroor Dhas, Script writer and P. Madhavan.

Srinivasan was the president of the South Indian Film Chamber of Commerce for 13 years. He can be credited with introducing many people to the film industry through his films (35 in total) in five Indian languages – Tamil, Telugu, Hindi, Malayalam, and Kannada.

== Personal life ==
Srinivasan had two children, Kannappan and Visalakshi with his first wife Azhagammai Aachi (died on 21 May 1981).

== Death ==
Srinivasan had diabetes and died on 30 July 1977 following a heart attack.

== Filmography ==
=== As producer ===
- Thirudaathae
- Panam
- Ambikapathy
- Lakshmi Kalyanam
- Kandan Karunai
- Cinema Paiththiyam
- Santhi (1965)

== Awards and honours ==
- 1962 – Jury, International Documentary and Short Film section, 12th Berlin International Film Festival
- 1962 – Certificate of Merit for the Third Best Feature Film, Sarada (producer)
