= Nehru Park, Chennai =

Public park in Chennai, India

Nehru Park
- Type: Urban park
- Location: Egmore, Chennai, India
- Area: 1.73 acres (0.70 hectares)
- Operator: Corporation of Chennai
- Status: Open all year

Nehru Park is an urban public park in Egmore, Chennai, India. It is located on Poonamallee High Road. The park covers an area of 1.73 acres (0.70 hectares). It was one of the two parks in the city taken over for the construction of underground stations of Chennai Metro, the other one being the Thiru Vi Ka Park. The park is scheduled to be reopened to public in March 2018.

== The park ==
Originally spread over 7,250 square metres, the park was reduced to 7,000 square metres when Chennai Metro Rail used a portion of the park for the construction of metro station in 2011. About 65 trees were felled to felicitate construction of the metro station and its parking lot.

== See also ==
- Parks in Chennai
