= Kalaignar Centenary Park =

Park in Chennai district, Tamil Nadu, India

- Location within Chennai
- Location: Gopalapuram
- Nearest city: Chennai
- Coordinates: 13.0506°N 80.2541°E
- Area: 13.29 acres (5.38 ha)
- Created: Department of Horticulture and Plantation crops
- Open: 7 October 2024
- Status: Open
- Designation: Park

Kalaignar Centenary Park is a world class park situated at Gopalapuram neighbourhood in Chennai, Tamil Nadu in India.

== Location ==
This park is located with the coordinates of (13.0506°N 80.2541°E), on Cathedral road (opposite to Semmozhi Park) a few metres from the Anna Flyover.

Kalaignar Centenary Park (Chennai)

== Foundation and opening ==
Foundation stone for the construction of the park was unveiled on 27 February 2024 by M.K Stalin Chief Minister of Tamil Nadu. And the park is opened for public on 7 October 2024 to commemorate M. Karunanidhi's 100 years.

== Establishment ==
The park has been established on a 13.29-acre land. The land was the property of Agri Horticultural society, a private firm, from which the property was recovered by the Government of Tamil Nadu. Now, the value of the property is at about ₹1,000 crore and it now belongs to the Department of Horticulture and Plantation crops for which the property was transferred by the Government of Tamil Nadu.

The park is developed at a cost of about ₹46 crore.

== Surroundings ==
On its northern side is situated the Senganthal park and on its southern side is located the Semmozhi Poonga. This park and the Semmozhi Poonga will be connected by a footbridge.

== Fees ==
Different fee structures inside the park are implemented. An entry fee, a zipline adventure ticket, an entry ticket for the aviary, a ticket for the musical fountain show, a ticket for entry into the glass garden that houses rare flora, a charge for taking photographs inside the park, separately for camera and video camera are the entry fee descriptions in this park. Entry fee is Rs.100 for elders and Rs.50 for kids.
