= Nageshwara Rao Park =

Regional tourist place in India

Desodharaka Nageswara Rao Pantulu Park
- Interactive map of Desodharaka Nageswara Rao Pantulu Park
- Type: Urban park
- Location: Mylapore, Chennai, India
- Coordinates: 13°2′11″N 80°15′47″E
- Area: 4 acres (1.6 hectares)
- Created: 1940
- Operator: Corporation of Chennai
- Status: Open all year

Nageswara Rao Park is a 4-acre (1.6-hectare) park located on Luz Corner in Mylapore, Chennai, India. The park, with a separate play area for children, is kept open to the public from 5 a.m. to 8 p.m. and is a popular place for morning walks among the locals. The park also hosts music kutcheris and civic forums, on the weekends all year round. The park has a badminton court. The park is maintained by Sundaram Finance.

== History ==
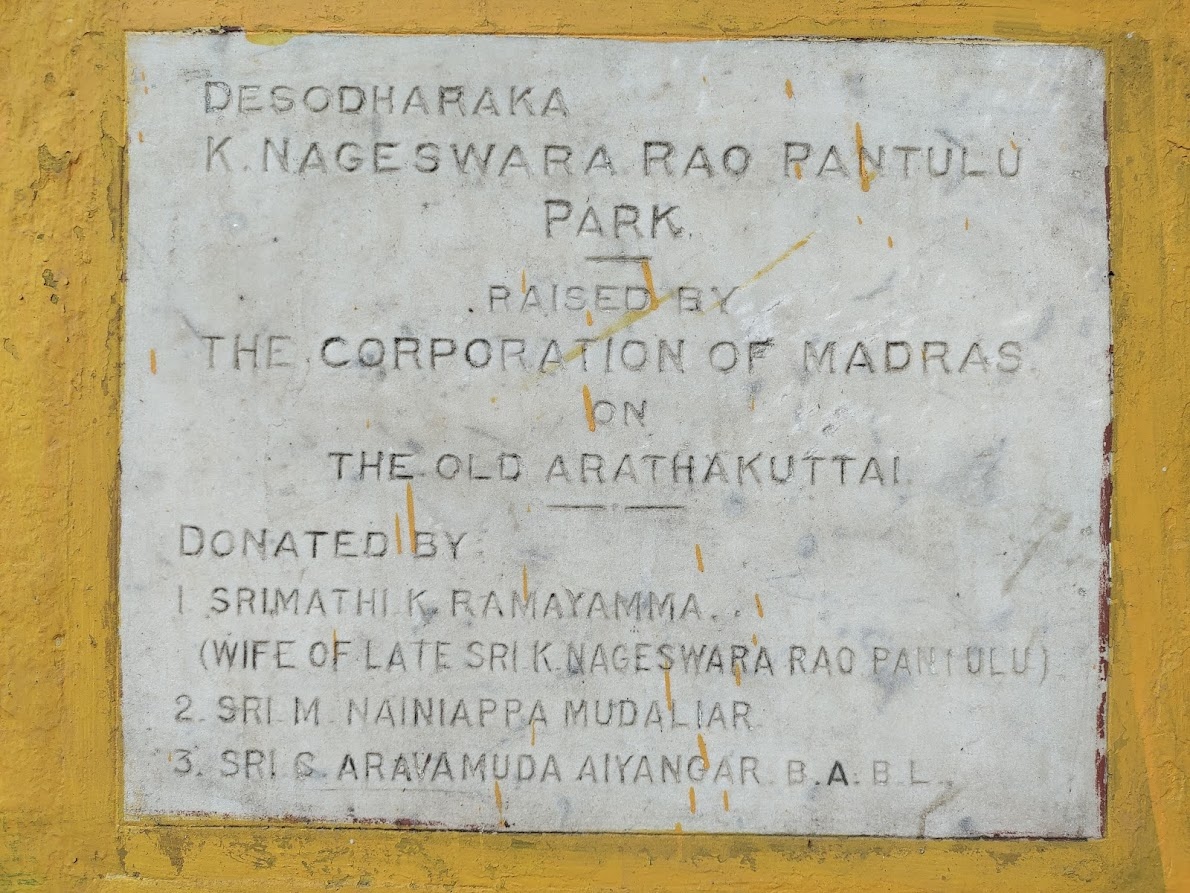
Plaque 1

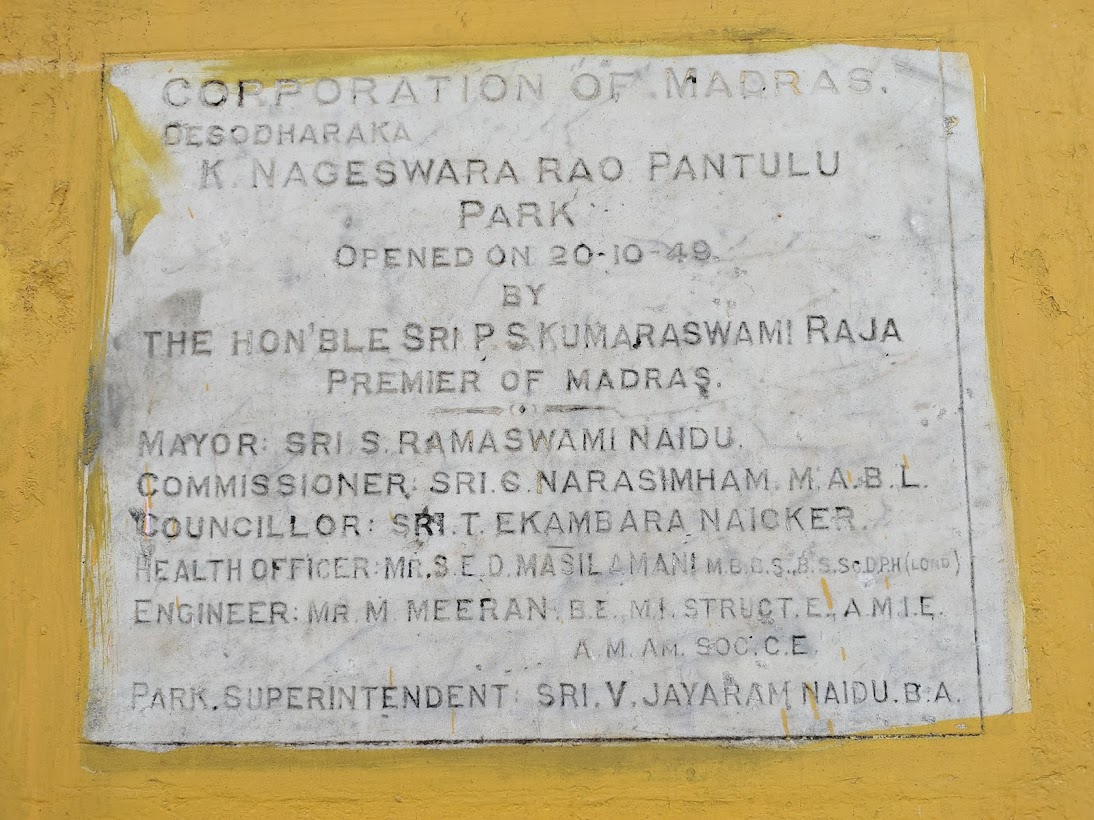
Plaque 2

Nageswara Rao Park was originally called Arathakuttai (big pond). In deference to a request by the Chennai Corporation, the owners of the pond, Ramayamma Pantulu, Aravamutha Iyengar and Nainiappa Mudaliar, donated the pond to the civic body for creating a park. After its creation, the park was named after Desodharaka Nageswara Rao Pantulu. It was opened to the public by P. S. Kumaraswamy Raja, the then Chief Minister of Madras, on 20 October 1940. Originally developed in a much smaller area on Luz Church Road, the park was expanded when more land was donated by Ramayee Ammal, M. Nainappa Mudaliyar, V. Kumaraswamy Raja, Vinjamur Govindarajachari and Aravamadhu Iyengar in the same year. In 1996, the Chennai Corporation re-developed the park and started maintaining it. A pond known as Aaratha kuttai was filled in and made into a garden. It was Nageswara Rao, founder of the neighbouring Amrutanjan factory, who convinced the local residents to develop the area when the pond began to dry up. It is in his memory that the park was named after him.

== Flora ==
Tree varieties found in the park include Lapostromea, Cassia fistula, Tabulia and foliage trees like Pungam, Neem, palms, Ficus religiosa and Thespesia. Medicinal and ornamental plants such as Tabubia, Copper pod, Enterolobium saman, Cassia sp. and Ixora sp. are also found in the park.

== Developments ==
In 2002, an initiative named "Project Green Spaces - Dr. Nageswara Rao Park" was started, whereby the park was adopted by the Chennai Chapter of the American Chamber of Commerce in India (AMCHAM). This also included support from the local community, which had donated for the face-lift of the park. The estimated initial costs of the face-lift was pegged at ₹ 3 million, while the ongoing costs at ₹ 600,000 per annum. The establishment of a corpus fund of ₹ 10 million for the upkeep of the park was also proposed.

In 2009, a composting yard consisting of three pits was set up at the rear of the park to make compost from the garden waste that are collected from eight bins in the park. The project is funded by Sundaram Finance, which also maintains the park belonging to the Chennai Corporation.

== Incidents ==
On 7 November 2010, a man was killed while taking a morning stroll on the dedicated track in the park, when a tree branch snapped off and fell on his head after a heavy rain due to cyclone that passed near the city after a gap of 14 years.

== See also ==
- Parks in Chennai
