= Secretariat Park =

Urban park in Chennai, India

- தலைமைச்செயலகப் பூங்கா
- Location within Chennai
- Type: Urban park
- Location: Fort St. George, Chennai, India
- Coordinates: 13°04′50″N 80°17′20″E
- Area: 18.5 acres (7.5 ha)
- Created: 2009
- Operator: Corporation of Chennai
- Status: Open all year

Secretariat Park is an urban park at Chennai, India. The park is located opposite the Secretariat at Fort St. George on Rajaji Salai, near Chennai Port.

== History ==
The park was originally an undeveloped land near the port with some trees. In 2009, Corporation of Chennai developed the land measuring 18.5 acres (7.5 hectares) into a park at a cost of ₹ 97.5 million. The park was inaugurated on 29 May 2009 by the then chief minister of Tamil Nadu M. Karunanithi.

== The park ==
The park stretches from the Reserve Bank of India subway to the War Memorial and measures 18.5 acres. The park has a grand circular fountain at the centre and pedestrian walkways. Other features in the park include tree court with 18 granite benches laid around the trees, one-acre sunken court that is below the road level for children, two public rest houses, and grand granite plazas for practising yoga. There are three ramps connected to the pathways, enabling people with disability to make use of all parts of the park. The walls have murals done by arts students. The central fountain has an abstract design made of an alloy of copper and tin.

A park also has a parking lot with a toilet block. It also houses a separate toilet facility and children play area for slum dwellers of Annai Sathya Nagar located nearby.

== See also ==
- Parks in Chennai
