= Sirukoodalpatti =

Village in Tamil Nadu, India

Sirukoodalpatti is a village located in Sivaganga district of southern Tamil Nadu state, India. It is part of Chettinad region located about seven kilometers away from Karaikudi and four kilometers from Pillayarpatti (via Alagiya Devi Temple).Film producer A. L. Srinivasan, poet Kannadasan and writer, director, producer and lyricist Panchu Arunachalam were all born in Sirukoodalpatti.

It is located at 10.142596°N 78.6476751°E.
