= Thiru. Vi. Ka. Park =

Park in Chennai, India

Thiru Vi Ka Park
- Shenoy Nagar Park
- திரு. வி. க. பூங்கா
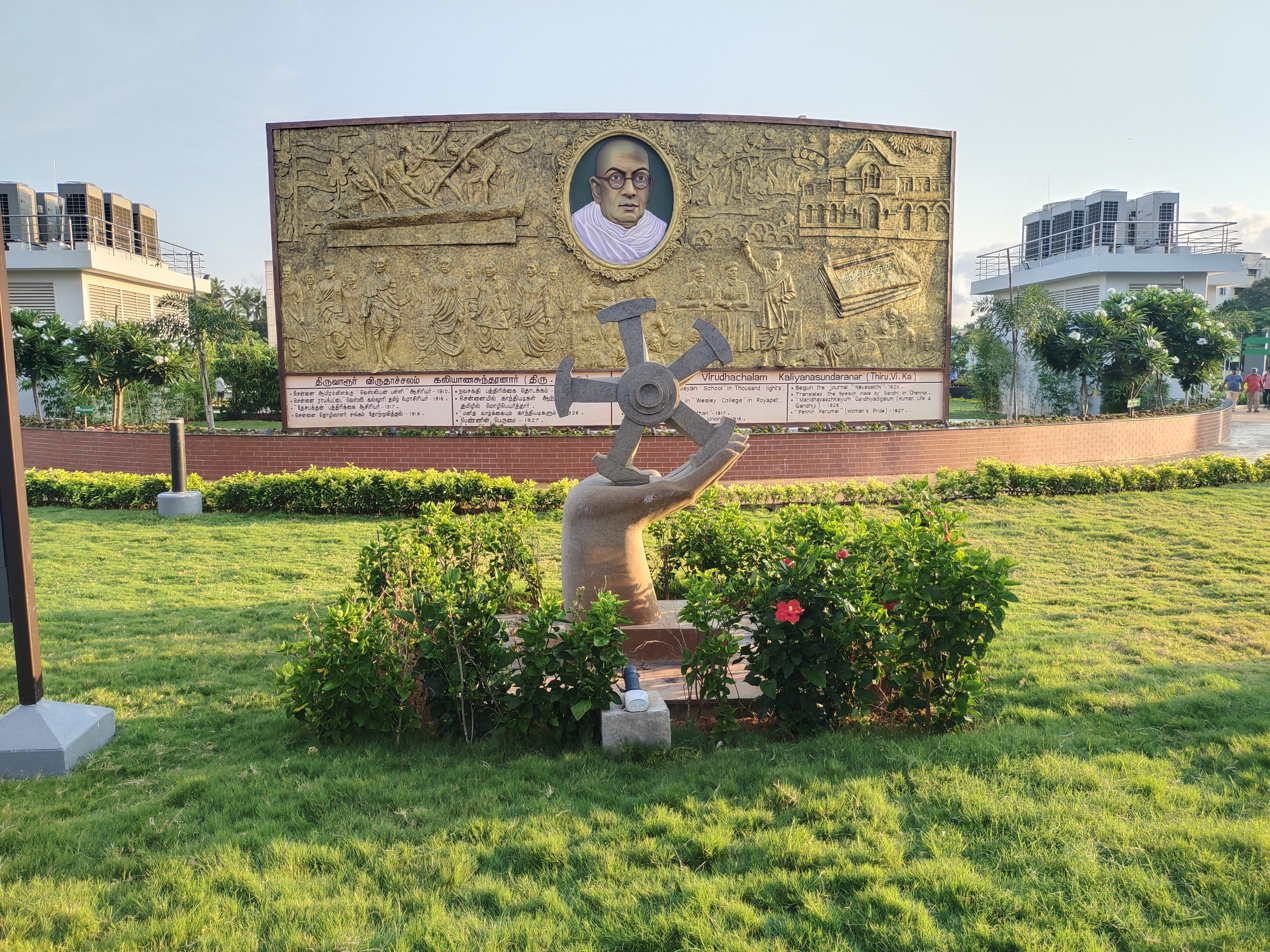
- Entrance of the park
- Location in Shenoy Nagar
- Type: Urban park
- Location: Chennai, India
- Coordinates: 13.0786°N 80.2251°E
- Area: 8.8 acres (3.6 hectares)
- Opened: Originally 2008; Reopened 4 April 2023
- Closed: 2011
- Etymology: Thiru. V. Kalyanasundaram
- Operator: Greater Chennai Corporation
- Status: Open
- Public transit: Shenoy Nagar metro station

Thiru Vi Ka Park, also known as Shenoy Nagar Park, is an urban park at Chennai, India. The park is located in Shenoy Nagar.

== History ==
The park originally spanned about 8.8 acres with around 300 trees. In 2007, the Chennai Corporation developed the park at a cost of ₹ 64 lakhs, including installing statues of some leaders, and opened it to the public in 2008. However, in 2011, the park was closed owing to construction work of the Chennai Metro Rail. About 130 trees were axed down to make way for the metro rail construction. Out of 328 trees, 242 were cut down, and 56 were translocated to accommodate for the metro rail construction. The metro rail work was completed in May 2017, but the park remained closed. A renovation project worth ₹ 4 crores was announced later that year. After several delays, the park was finally reopened to the public on 4 April 2023, inaugurated by Chief Minister M. K. Stalin. The total renovation cost was ₹ 18 crores. The park now has a walking track, skating rink, beach volleyball court, a basketball court, a cricket net practice space, an open gym, a yoga centre, and a reading zone. The maintenance of the park was handed over to a private firm, Quess Corp Limited, on 28 November 2023.

== Gallery ==
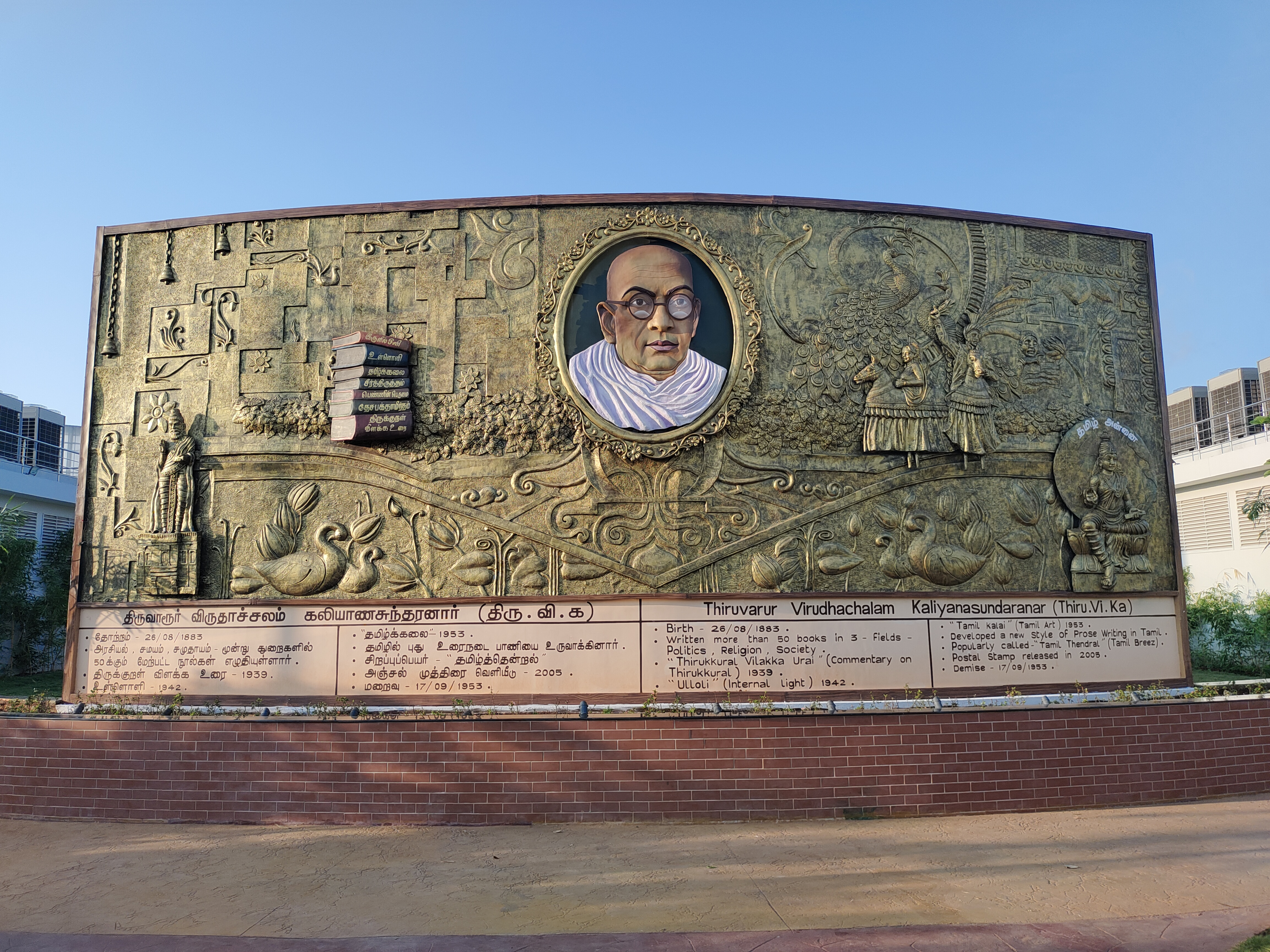
Gallery

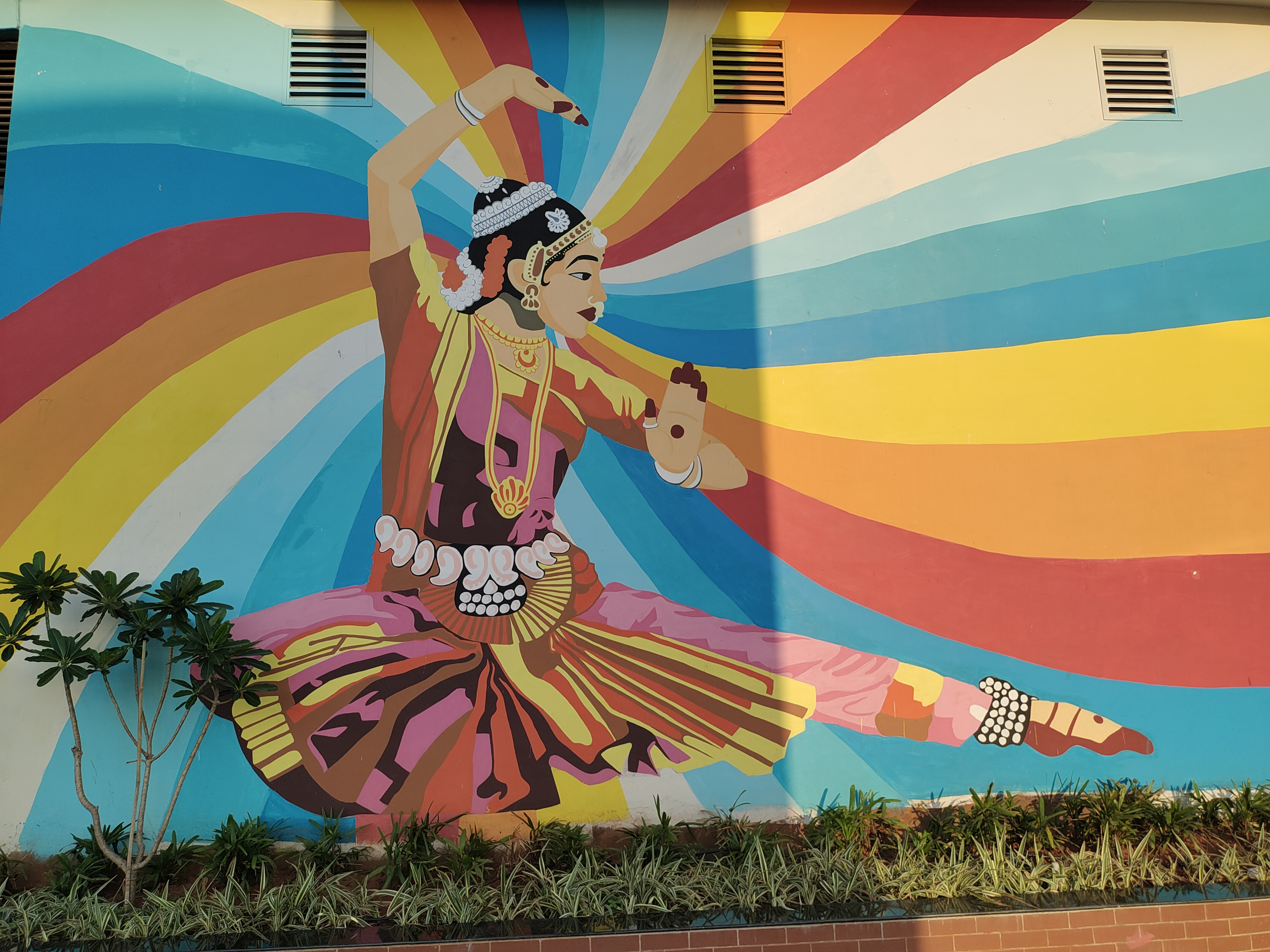
Art on the Wall

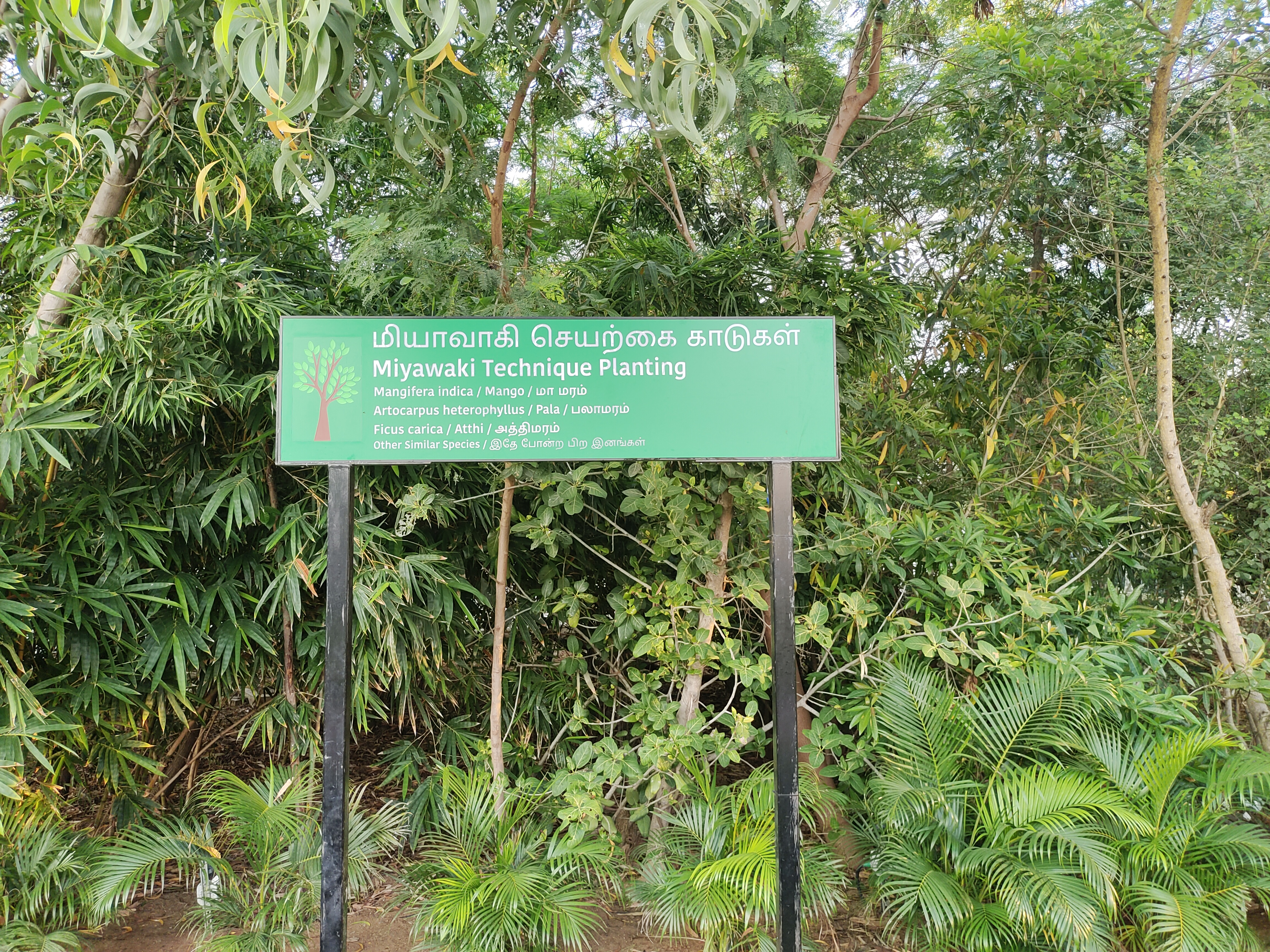
Miyawaki Garden

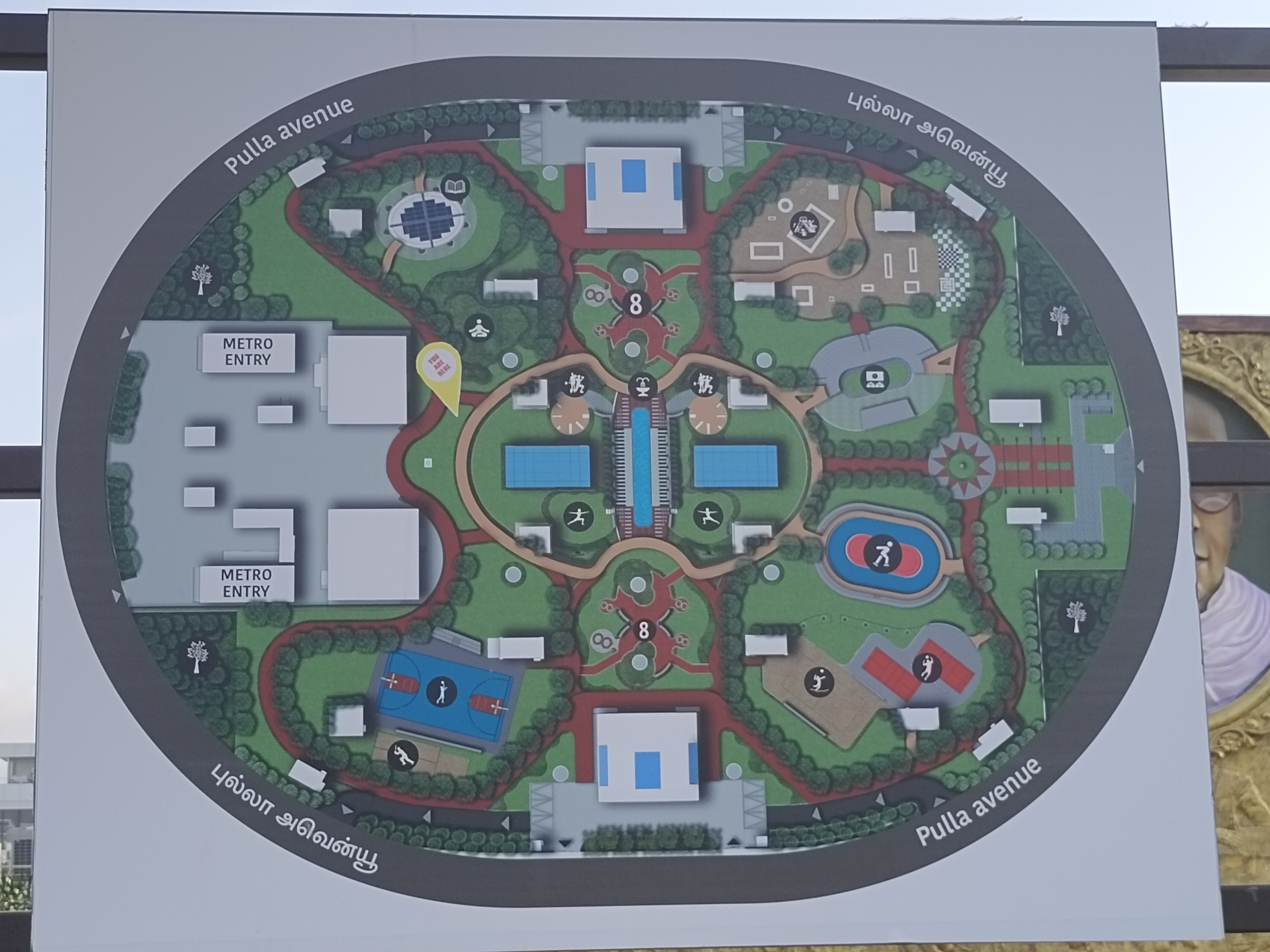
Map of the Park

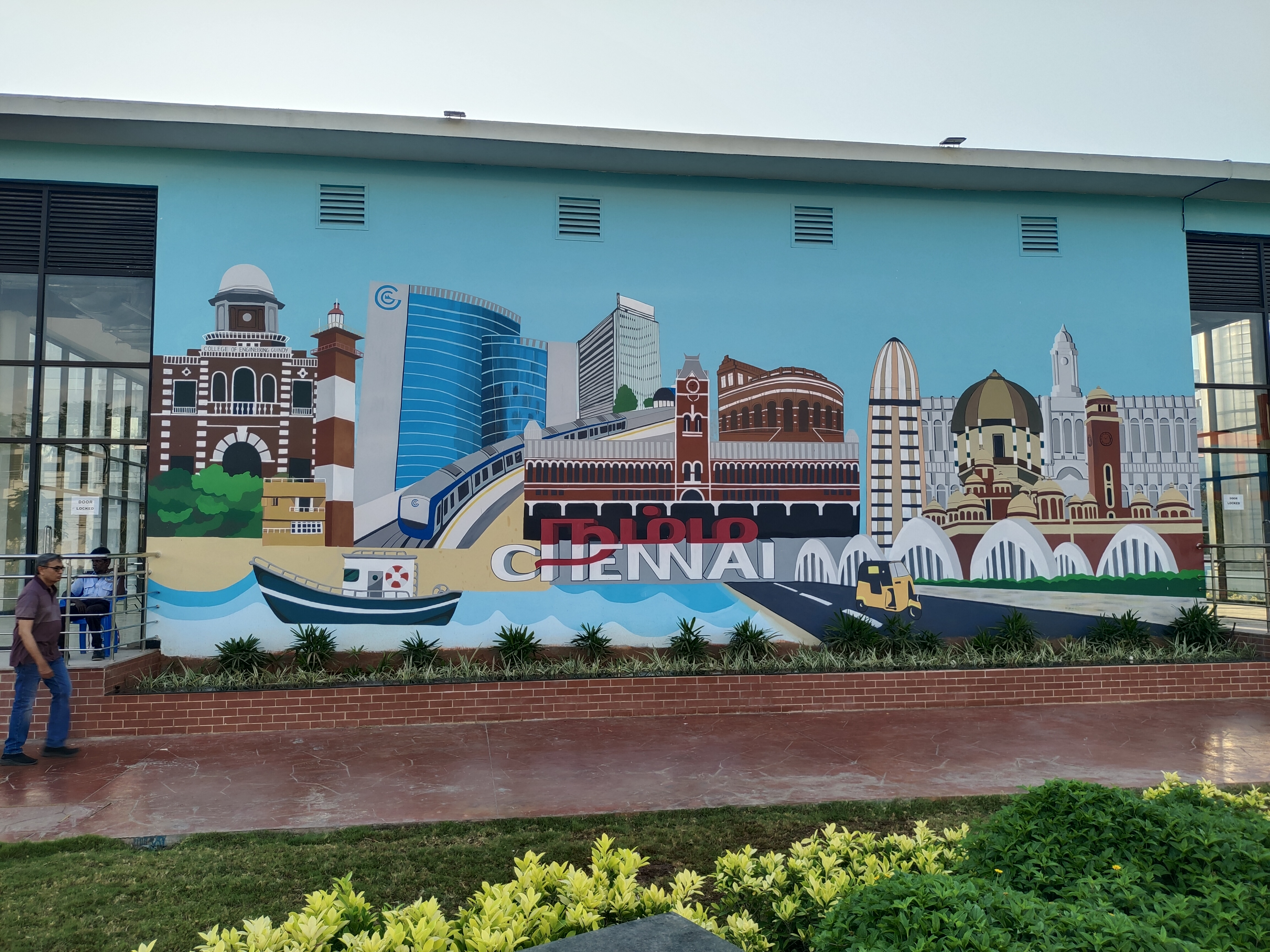
Namma Chennai Collage

== See also ==
- Parks in Chennai
