= Semmozhi Poonga =

Botanical garden in Chennai, India

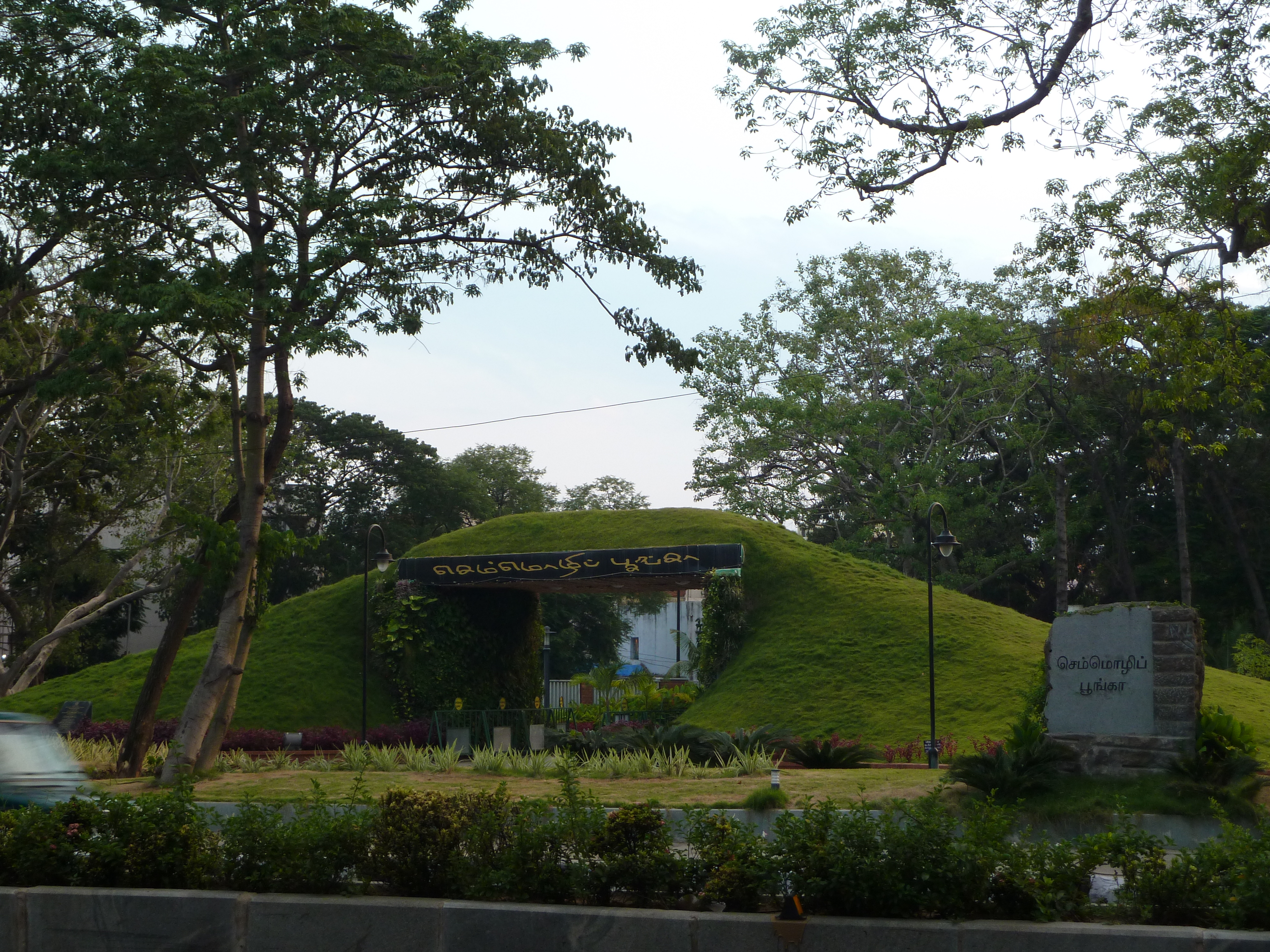
- Entrance of the park
- Interactive map of Semmozhi Poonga
- Type: Urban park
- Location: Teynampet, Chennai, India
- Coordinates: 13.0505°N 80.2514°E
- Area: 20 acres (8.1 hectares)
- Created: 2010
- Operator: Tamil Nadu Horticultural Development Agency (TANHODA)
- Status: Open
- Parking: Space for around 100 cars and 500 two-wheelers

Semmozhi Poonga, variously spelled as Semmoli Poonga (literally translated to "Classical Language Park"), is a botanical garden in Chennai set up jointly by the Horticulture and Agricultural Engineering department of the Government of Tamil Nadu. The garden was opened on 24 November 2010 by then chief Minister M. Karunanidhi and is the first botanical garden in the city. The garden is located in the Cathedral Road–Anna Salai junction, opposite the American Consulate, on the erstwhile Drive-in Woodlands Hotel. Encompassing an area of 20 acres (320 grounds), it was built at a cost of ₹ 80 million. More than 500 species of plants are being grown in the area, in addition to the 80 trees that were already in existence during the development of the park, some of them being more than 100 years old. The garden houses some of the popular exotic flora and rare plant species, medicinal and aromatic herbs. Many of the exotic plants are imported from countries like China and Thailand, including a plethora of bonsai varieties of ficus microcarpa and ficus ginseng.

== History ==
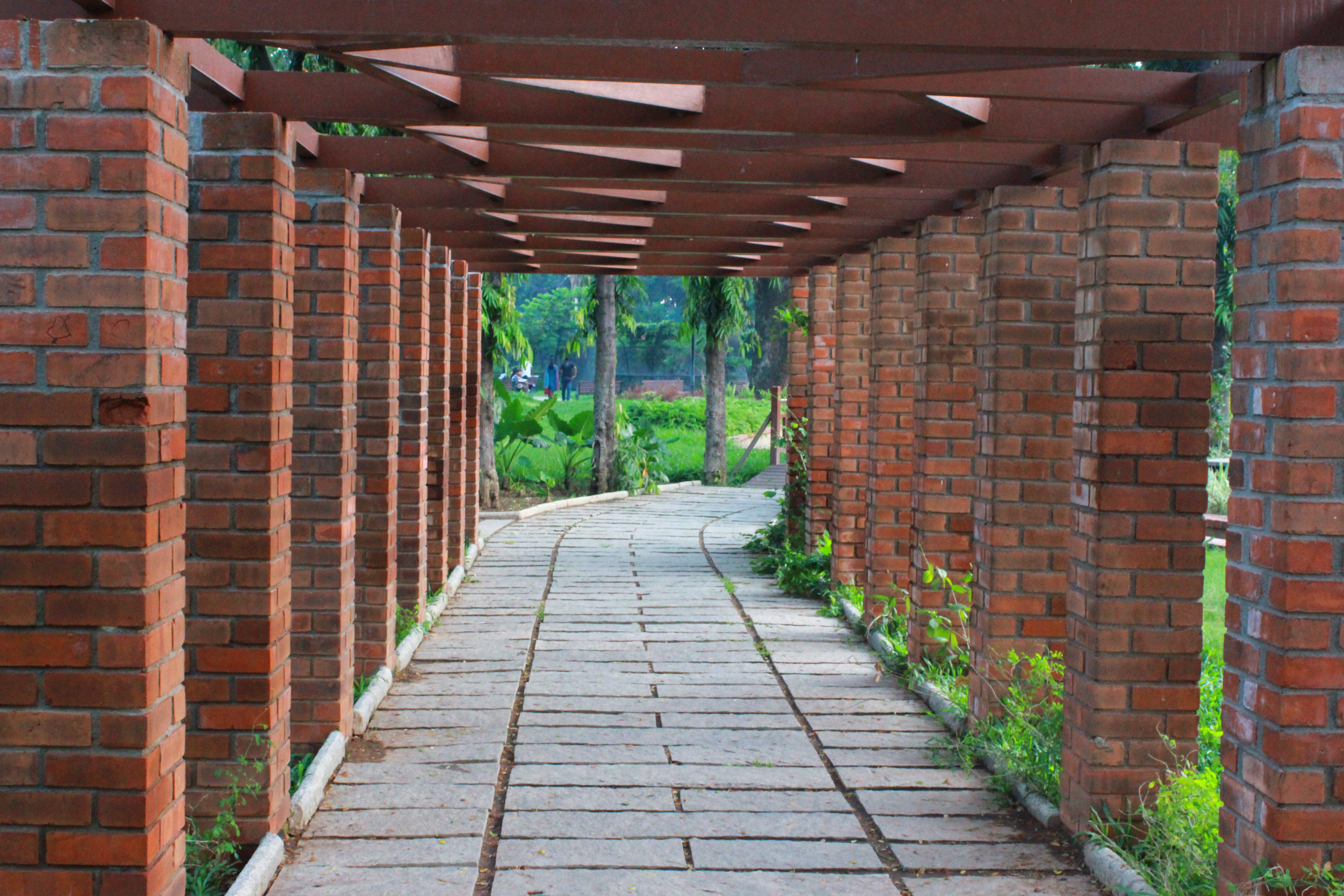
Walkway at the park

The area in which the botanical garden stands today was formerly the location of the Woodlands Drive-In restaurant, the city's first drive-in restaurant, and the Agri-Horticultural Society. In April 1962, the Agri-Horticultural Society sub-leased the 18-acre land to hotelier K. Krishna Rau, who started the Woodlands Drive-in Hotel on 15 April 1962. It was an extension of the "Woodlands" brand, then popular in the city as the only "Indian hotel." In 1982, the annual Chennai Book Fair conducted by BAPASI was held in the hotel premises. Early in 1989, the Tamil Nadu Government had set in motion the closure of the restaurant. After almost two decades, the restaurant ended its operation on 12 April 2008, and through a High Court order after a prolonged legal battle, the land was handed over to the government, where it planned to set up the botanical garden, a research centre and a green house for developing rare species of medicinal and non-medicinal plants and flowers. On 13 November 2009, the Supreme Court gave its consent to the state government to set up the garden. The garden has been christened such to commemorate the Classical Tamil Conference, which was held earlier in 2010. The cost of the land was valued at more than ₹ 10,000 million at the time of opening. The government appointed a city-based firm of architects—Rajendra Associates—as consultant to design, supervise and manage the project.

== The garden ==
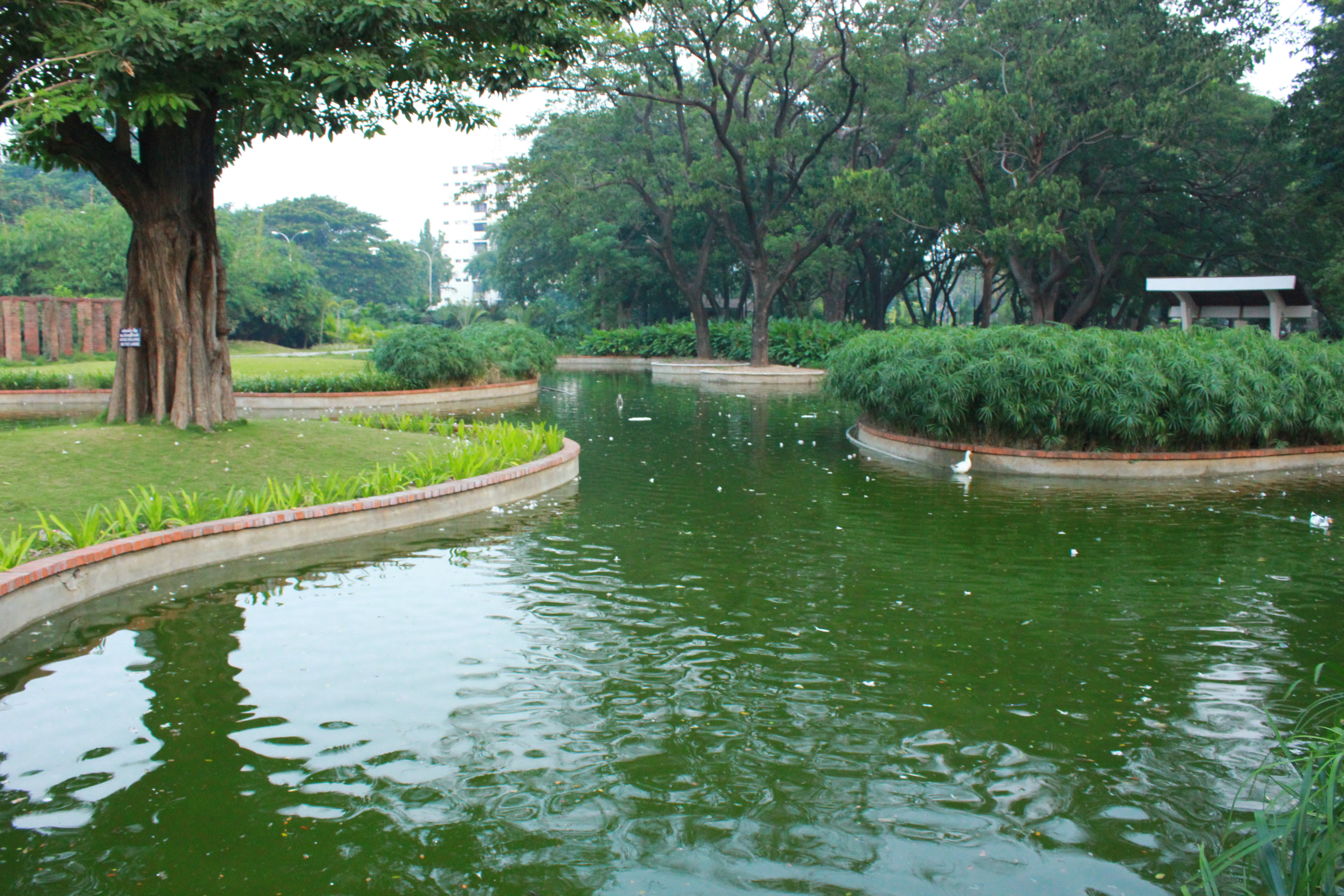
Artificial pond at the garden

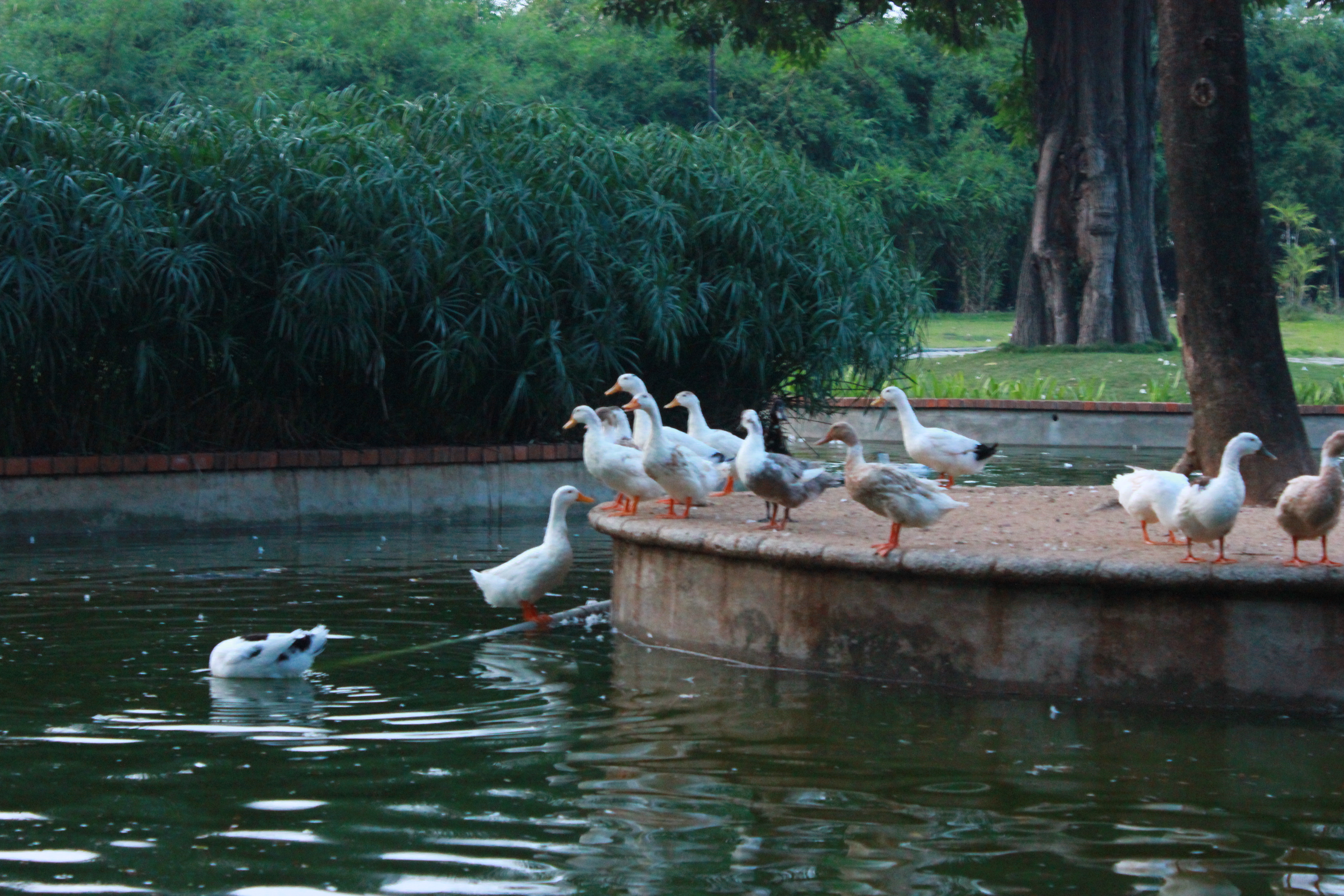
Ducks swimming in the pond

The garden features eight subgardens displaying flora of different varieties, such as a tree court, mural walk and bonsai, herbal and exotic gardens, in addition to an artificial duck pond. Incorporating elements of an Indian-Buddhist garden, the garden has a wide variety of indigenous species across 22 exclusive areas including palm court, tree court, golden garden (featuring plants that flower in different shades of gold), water and rock garden, butterfly garden, fern garden, sunken garden and theme garden. Twenty-five thematic gardens, including herbal, aromatic, maze and cascade adorn every corner of the park. The garden boasts several exotic herbal species and 90-odd spiral-shaped and multi-branched miniature trees grown in containers. The Bonsai garden is dotted with trees whose height range from 1 foot to 4 feet. At the fag end of the park is the Cascade garden.

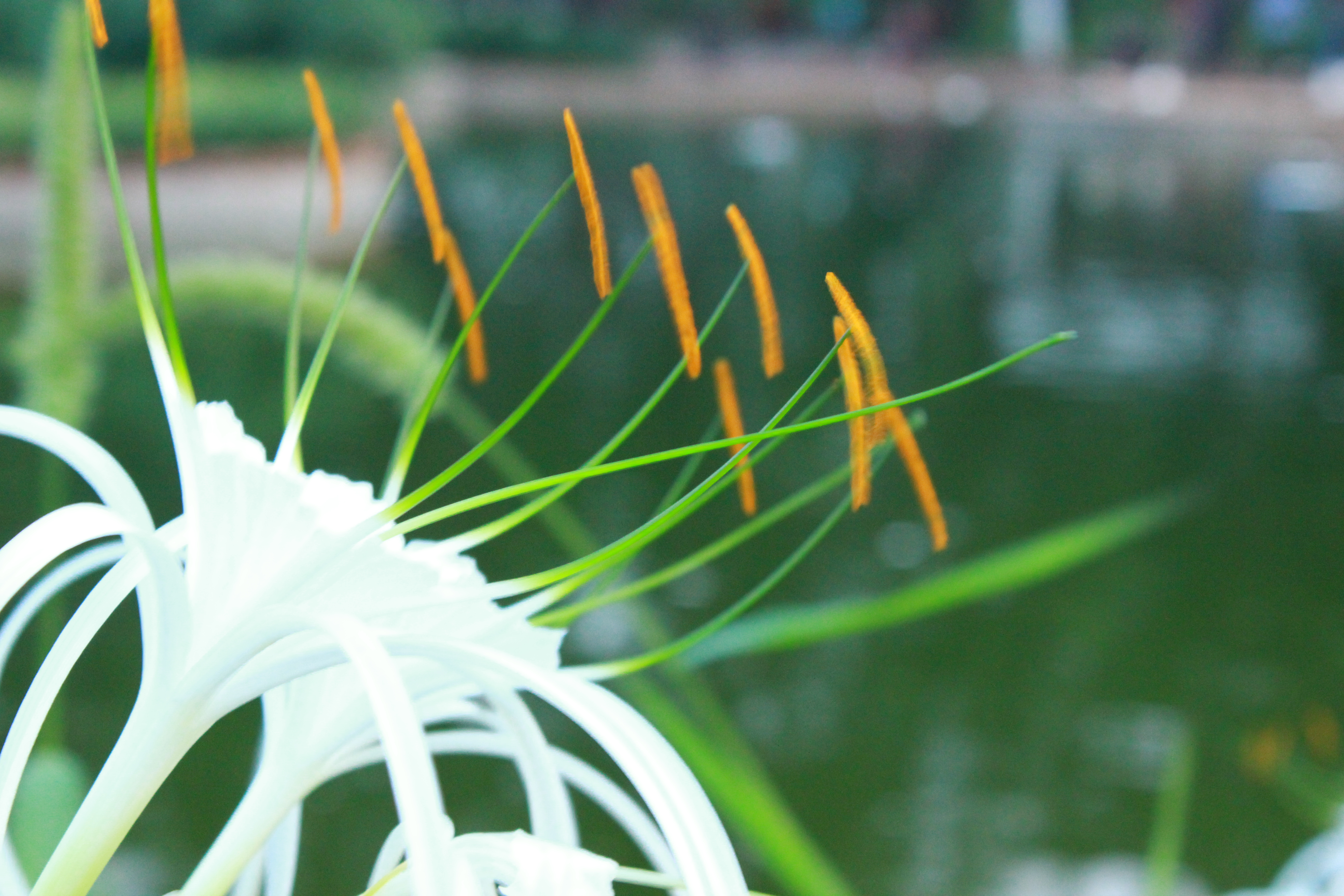
Flower at the garden

The arch near the entrance plaza is a vertical garden which is a unique feature of the botanical garden. The vertical garden, with an inbuilt irrigation and drain system for easy maintenance, is 22 feet long and 14 feet high intended to improve the scenic beauty of the park at the entrance. The arch is covered by 7,000 plants from 35 different species including dracena, lilies, ophiopogon, schefflera, philodendron and flowering plants like krishnagantha. The 10-feet-high green wall has plants raised in a poly trace imported from Canada. Micro-tube irrigation has been arranged for watering the plants. The plants cling to the 700-sq.ft. wall, which serves as the entry point. A butterfly garden near the cascade fountains along the Anna flyover has been carved up into the shape of a butterfly, with flowering plants of more than 30 species completely fenced. The aroma garden acts as a welcoming greenhouse for winged visitors, with species like parijatham and pavalamalli (Nyctanthes arbor-tristis) found to flock the place in bulk. An amphitheatre with concrete benches and covered by ferns has been built on the rear side of garden to host social and cultural functions. Other features of the garden include disabled-friendly ramps, a mural walk-through, and areas dotted with fountains, vertical gardens, ponds and cascades.

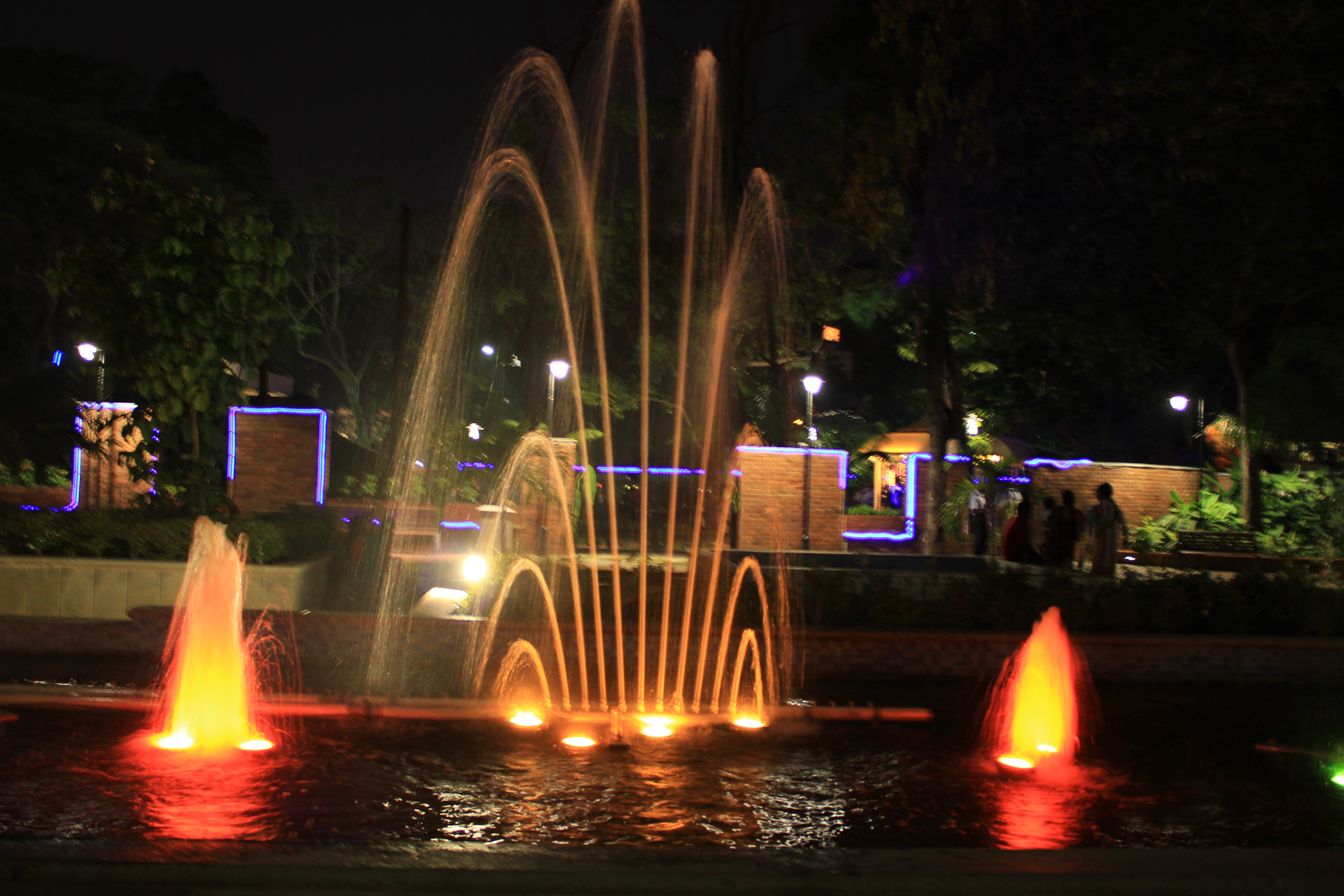
Poonga at night with dancing lights

In the course of the construction, the garden has received nearly ₹ 800,000 worth plants from China. These include flowering cacti that have a velvety, light pink at the top, non-flowering cacti with diameters up to about 45 cm, 'lucky' bamboo, ficus and bonsai varieties. The cacti were planted in the cacti garden decorated with white marble chips, pebbles and rocks from Porbandar. The garden also received water lilies from Thailand and 12 varieties of orchids.

There is also a plan to build a 10-ft-high monolithic structure, with 'Semmozhi Poonga' carved on it to welcome the visitors. There is an open auditorium in the garden, which is available on hire, to organise functions.

== Maintenance ==
Located at the central business district of Chennai, the park attracts several visitor and film crews for filming in the location. This has created maintenance problem, whereby there are complaints that the cinema shooting crews made a dent in the park's salubrious environs by damaging tender plants.

== Visitor information ==
The garden remains open for morning walkers from 6 am to 8 am. For visitors, the park remains open from 10 am through 8 pm on all days except Tuesdays. There is an open auditorium available within the garden which can be hired to organise functions. The garden has a parking lot that can accommodate around 100 cars and more than 500 two-wheelers. An entry fee of ₹ 15 is collected from all people above 10 years of age or 130 cm height. For the early morning walk, the entry is permitted only for monthly pass holders, for which ₹ 150 is charged.

== See also ==
- Madhavaram botanical garden
- Tholkappia Poonga
- Parks in Chennai
- List of botanical gardens in India
