= Kannadasan =

Tamil poet and lyricist (1927–1981)

- Kannadasan's Portrait at Kannadhasan Pathippagam
- Born: Muthiah Sathappan Chettiar; 24 June 1927; Sirukoodalpatti, Madras Presidency, British India
- Died: 17 October 1981 (aged 54); Chicago, Illinois, United States
- Citizenship: Indian
- Occupations: Poet, novelist, lyricist, politician, film producer.
- Spouses: Ponnazhagi (m. 1950–1981; his death); Parvathi (m. 1951–1981; his death); Valliammai (m. 1976–1981; his death)
- Children: 15
- Writing career
- Pen name: Karaimuthu Pulavar; Vanangamudi; Kanakappriyan; Parvathinathan; Arokiyasamy
- Language: Tamil
- Subjects: Poetry,Literature,
- Notable works: Arthamulla Indhu Madham; Yesu Kaaviyam
- Notable awards: National Film Award for Best Lyrics; 1968 Kuzhanthaikkaga; Sahitya Academy Award (1980)

Muthiah Sathappan Chettiar, better known as Kannadasan (24 June 1927 – 17 October 1981), was a poet, film song lyricist, producer, actor, script-writer, editor, philanthropist, and is heralded as one of the most important lyricists in India. With over 5,000 lyrics, 6,000 poems, and 232 books, Kannadasan is widely known by the sobriquet "Kaviarasu" ("king of poets") and he is also considered to be the greatest modern Tamil poet after Subramania Bharati. including novels, epics, plays, essays, his most popular being the 10-part religious book on Hinduism, Arthamulla Indhu Matham (Meaningful Hindu Religion). He won the Sahitya Akademi Award for his novel Cheraman Kathali in the year 1980 and was the first to receive the National Film Award for Best Lyrics, given in 1969 for the film Kuzhanthaikkaga. Like many great poets he also suffered from cyclothymia, which comes under the bipolar disorder spectrum.

== Personal life ==
Kannadasan was born to Sathappan Chettiar and Visalakshi Aachi in a Nattukottai Nagarathar family in Sirukoodalpatti, near Karaikudi, Tamil Nadu and was given the birth name Muthiah. He was the eighth of ten children to his parents. He was adopted by Chigappi Aachi for a sum of INR 7000 at an early age, who brought him up and was responsible for his early stages of school education. He completed his schooling till the 8th standard in Sirukudalpatti and Amaravathipudhur. He worked for a private company in Tiruvottiyur before taking up an editorial post in a Tamil Magazine where for the first time he took up the pseudonym Kannadasan. He died on 17 October 1981.

=== Religious views ===
Muthiah was a keen follower of the Dravidian atheistic movement. He had a great love of Tamil language and its culture and excelled in Tamil literature, both prose and poetry. He read the Thiruppaavai of Aandaal and was amazed at its mystic poetry, which had a deep and lasting impact on him. After a lot of introspection, he decided to go back to Hinduism. He renamed himself as Kannadaasan, meaning the servant of Lord Krishna (In Tamil, Kannan means Krishna and in Sanskrit, daasa means servant'. He dug deep into understanding Hinduism, and wrote his series of books on Hinduism titled Arthamulla Indhu Matham.

== Songwriting ==
Kannadasan's greatest contribution to Tamil culture is his songwriting. Before Kannadasan, many lyricists like Papanasam Sivan, Kambadasan, Vindhan, A. Maruthakasi, and Ku. Ma. Balasubramaniam were sought after in the Tamil music industry, but after the advent of Kannadasan, the scene changed. He quickly became the most sought-after lyricist in the industry and remained so until his death. Kannadasan was so popular that some songs written by other contemporary poets were considered to be written by Kannadhasan. Though, film lyrics have come a long way since his death, many people still consider Kannadasan to be the best songwriter. He is considered to be the greatest modern Tamil poet after Subramanya Bharathi.

He was the producer of the historic Tamil film Sivagangai Seemai portraying Marudhu Pandaiars, one of the pioneers in the Indian freedom struggle. The song "Santhupottu" from that film remains popular.

== Spiritual books ==
- Arthamulla Indhu Matham
- Yesu Kaviyam
- Bagavath geethai
- Ponmazhai
- Bajagovindam
- Sri Krishna Kavasam
- Sri Venkatesa Suprabatham - Andal Thirupaavai
- Ambigai Alagu Dharisanam
- Krishna Anthathi
- Sankara Pokisham

== Notable novels ==
- Cheraman kadhali
- Aval oru hindhu pen
- Sivappukal mukkuththi
- Ratha pushpangal
- Avalukakga oru padal
- Swarna saraswathi
- Nadantha kathai
- Meesa
- Suruthi seratha raagangal
- Mupadhu naalum pournami
- Arangamum antharangamum
- Kadal konda thennadu
- Ayiram thivu angkayarkanni
- Kamini kanchana
- Kutti kadhaigal
- Oru kavinani kathai
- Velangkudi thiruvila
- Ayiramkal mandapam
- Birundhavanam
- Aachi
- Vilaku matuma sivapu
- Aathanathu aathimanthi
- Anarkalai
- Athaivida ragasiyam
- Paarimalai kodi
- Oru Nadhiyin kadhai
- Sembagathaman kadhai
- Manampola vaazhvu
- Sivagangai seemai
- Santhithen sinthithen
- Oomaiyin Kottai
- Sarasuvin soundarya lagari
- Artham ulla indhu madham

== Poetry ==
- Mutruperatha Kaviyangal
- Sri krishna anthathi
- Ambigai alagu dharisanam
- Maangani
- Paadi kudutha mangalam
- Thaipaavai
- Kannadhasan Kavithaigal Parts 1-7
- Yesu Kaaviyam
- Pon Mazhai

== Autobiography ==
- Enathu Suyasaritham.
- Enathu Vasantha Kaalangal.
- Vanavasam.
- Manavasam.
- Naan Partha Arasiyal.

== Selected filmography ==
=== Lyrics ===
1. Singari
2. Aayirathil Oruvan
3. Mannadhi Mannan
4. Thaai Sollai Thattadhe
5. Thaayai Kaatha Thanayan
6. Paasam
7. Karuppu Panam
8. Panathottam
9. Paava Mannippu
10. Periya Idathu Penn
11. Dharmam Thalai Kaakkum
12. Anandha Jodhi
13. Needhikkuppin Paasam
14. Kudumba Thalaivan
15. Kaanchi Thalaivan
16. Parisu
17. Vettaikaaran
18. Panakkara Kudumbam
19. Palum Pazhamum
20. Thiruvilayadal
21. Saraswathi Sabatham
22. Pattikada Pattanama
23. Urimaikural
24. En Kadamai
25. Nadodi
26. Thanga Pathakkam
27. Lakshmi Kalyanam
28. Paasa Malar
29. Moondram Pirai
30. Iruvar Ullam
31. Dheerga Sumangali
32. Aalayam
33. Annai
34. Kunkhumam
35. Naanum Oru Penn
36. Pazhani
37. Varumayin Niram Sivappu
38. Billa
39. Thee
40. Deiva Magan
41. Kalathur Kannamma
42. Paarthaal Pasi Theerum
43. Paadha Kaanikkai
44. Annai Velankanni
45. Thillu Mullu

=== As actor, writer and producer ===
Year	Film	Actor	Writer	Producer	Notes
1952	Parasakthi	Yes	No	No	
1954	Illara Jothi	No	Yes	No	
1954	Sugam Enge	No	Yes	No	
1956	Madurai Veeran	No	Yes	No	
1956	Tenali Raman	No	Yes	No	
1957	Mahadhevi	No	Yes	No	
1958	Maalaiyitta Mangai	No	Yes	Yes	
1958	Nadodi Mannan	No	Yes	No	
1959	Sivagangai Seemai	No	Yes	Yes	
1960	Kavalai Illaadha Manithan	Yes	Yes	Yes	
1960	Mannathi Mannan	No	Yes	No	
1960	Sangilithevan	No	Yes	No	
1961	Thirudathe	No	Yes	No	
1962	Vanambadi	No	No	Yes	
1962	Sumaithaangi	No	No	Yes	
1963	Ratha Thilagam	Yes	Yes	No	
1964	Karuppu Panam	Yes	Yes	No	as blackmailer
1968	Lakshmi Kalyanam	No	Yes	No	
1972	Thiruneelakandar	No	Yes	No	
1973	Suryagandhi	Yes	No	No	as singer in song "Paramasivan Kazhuthilirundhu"
1975	Apoorva Raagangal	Yes	No	No	as himself
1979	Velum Mayilum Thunai	Yes	No	No	
1979	Sigappukkal Mookkuthi	No	Yes	No	
1981	Thillu Mullu	No	Yes	No	
1981	Deiva Thirumanangal	Yes	No	No	

== Poet laureate ==
Kannadasan was the poet laureate of the Tamil Nadu government at the time of his death. He wrote two notable autobiographies, titled Vanavasam, a book about his past life whilst he was atheist, with the Dravida Munnetra Kazhagam and a sequel, titled Manavasam a book about his life after he had left DMK.

== Contribution to Tamil literature ==
Kannadasan was a prolific writer and his writing covered a variety of forms- poems, novels, lyrics for Tamil films and books on spirituality. His series titled Arthamulla Indhu Matham (Meaningful Hindu Religion) is known for its simplicity in explaining the principles of Hinduism. Many of Kannadasan's poems have been translated into French. He wrote and published several volumes of poetry. He was an admirer of Kambar, and wrote a number of poems praising Kambar's artistry, contrary to the satire ("Kambarasam") on the same by C.N. Annadurai. He also spoke at several of the Kambar festivals. He sang the beauty of Sita's gait and the shoulders of Rama; he spoke of beauty intoxicating and dropped me in a vessel of amrut (nectar)" This is one of Kannadasan's tribute to the poet Kambar.

== Death ==
Kannadasan died on 17 October 1981 in Chicago, United States, where he had gone to attend a Tamil conference organized by the Tamil Association of Chicago. He was aged only 54 at the time of his death. The song "Kanne Kalaimane" from the film Moondram Pirai, released a few months later, was his last song.

== Legacy ==
The Government of Tamil Nadu built a memorial hall named "Kaviarasar Kannadasan Manimandapam" at Karaikudi. The road adjoining Natesan Park in T. Nagar, Chennai where Kannadasan resided from 1958, previously called Hensman Road, was renamed "Kannadasan street" in his honour after his demise. It was in this house where 7 Chief Ministers from M. Bhaktavatsalam to J. Jayalalithaa had visited Kannadasan. Kannadhasan once owned 14 cars which were parked on either side of the road in front of house and the last remaining one which was given by K. Kamaraj is still at display at the house.

As part of Kannadasan's birth centenary commemorations in 2026, an eggshell mosaic portrait of the poet made from more than 1,000 eggshells was created as a tribute. During the commemorative event, a proposal was made to the Government of Tamil Nadu to establish Kannadasan Research Chairs in universities to study his contributions to Tamil cinema and literature, and to translate his literary works into world languages, including Chinese and Spanish.

== See also ==
- List of Sahitya Akademi Award winners for Tamil
- List of Indian writers
- List of Tamil-language writers
