= Dr. Annie Besant Park =

Urban park in Chennai, India

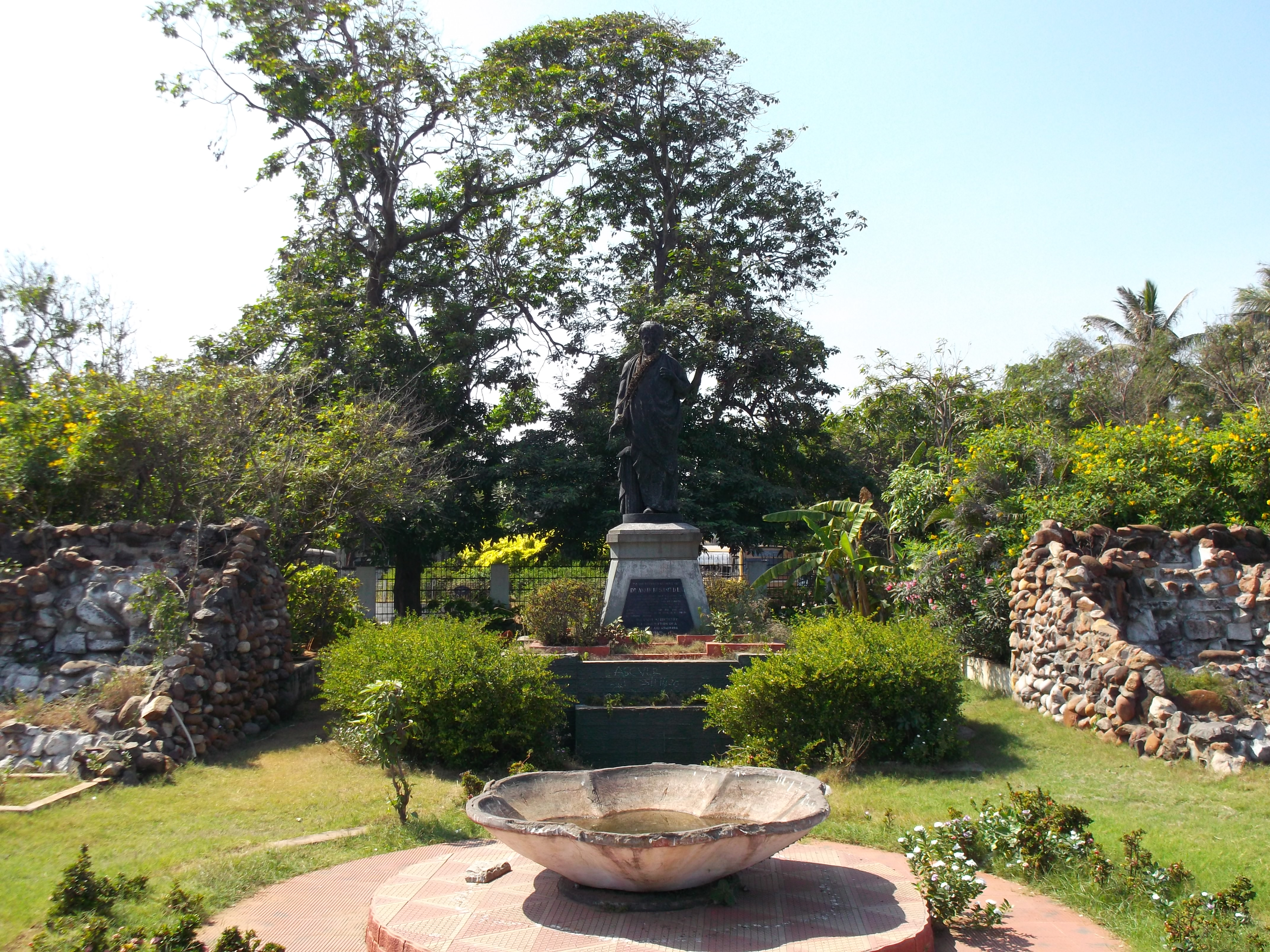
- Dr. Annie Besant Park
- Interactive map of Dr. Annie Besant Park
- Type: Urban park
- Location: Triplicane in Chennai, India
- Coordinates: 13°3′1″N 80°16′50″E
- Operator: Corporation of Chennai
- Status: Open all year

Dr. Annie Besant Park is an urban park at Chennai, India. Technically a traffic island, it gained prominence due to its location at the Marina Beach.

== Location ==
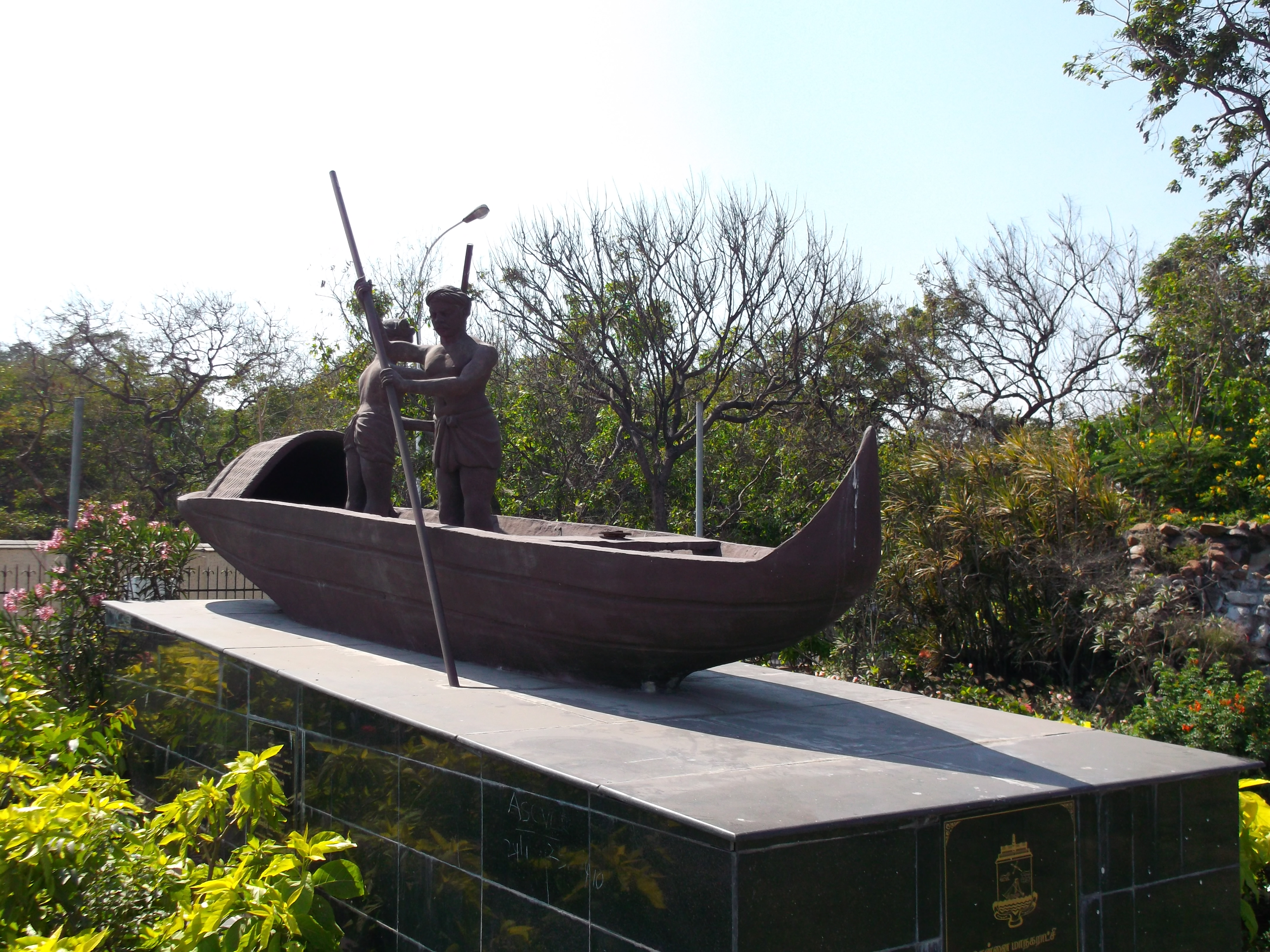
Fishermen statue at Annie Besant Park

Dr. Annie Besant Park is located at the junction of Dr. Besant Road and Kamarajar Salai near Vivekananda House in Triplicane, opposite Marina Beach.

== The park ==
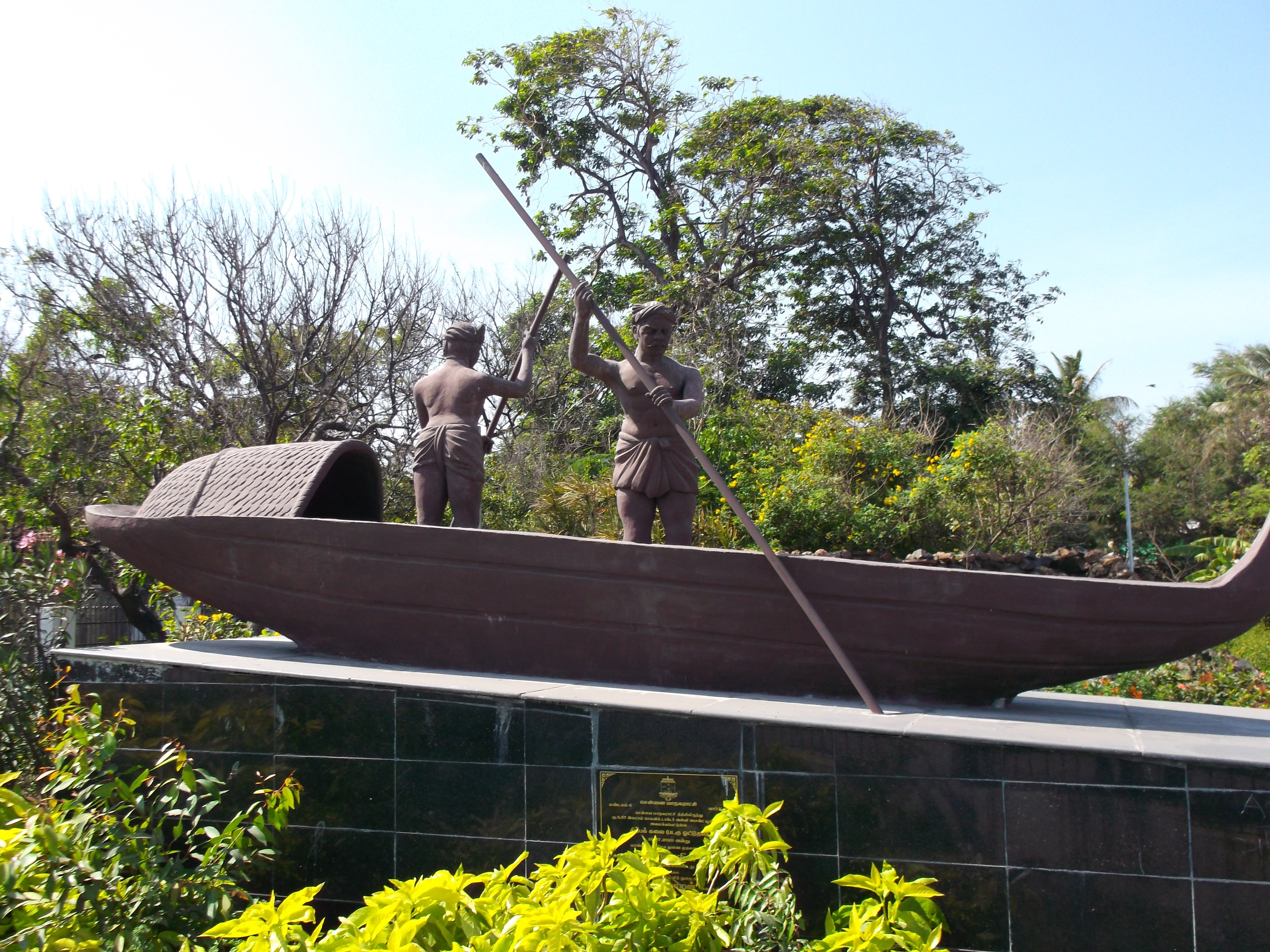
'Fishermen at the Buckingham Canal' statue

The triangular park is technically a traffic island.

In 2010, a thematic sculpture of a boat, called the 'Fishermen at the Buckingham Canal', designed by the students of Government College of Arts and Crafts, Chennai, was installed by the Corporation of Chennai.

The park is one of the seven entry points to the beach where drop gates have been planned by the Corporation.

== See also ==
- Parks in Chennai
