= Shenoy Nagar =

- neighbourhood
- Location within Chennai Location within Tamil Nadu Location within India
- Coordinates: 13.0794°N 80.2289°E
- Country: India
- State: Tamil Nadu
- District: Chennai District
- Metro: Chennai

Government
  - Body: Chennai Corporation

Languages
  - Official: Tamil
- Time zone: UTC+5:30 (IST)
- Planning agency: CMDA
- Civic agency: Chennai Corporation
- Website: www.chennai.tn.nic.in

Shenoy Nagar is a neighbourhood in Chennai, India and is a part of the Greater Anna Nagar Region. It is surrounded by Anna Nagar East in the North also Kilpauk in the North and East, Chetpet in its very rare South-East end, Aminjikarai in the South, Arumbakkam in the South-West and Anna Nagar in the North-West barely. Thiru Vi Ka Park is located here. A skating park was also opened in 2006 by the Government of Tamil Nadu to encourage the kids to learn skating. The area is served by Shenoy Nagar Metro station which falls on the Metro line between Chennai International Airport and Chennai Central.

== Etymology ==
The area was named after J P L Shenoy I.C.S., the Commissioner of the Corporation of Madras who conceived the idea of creating a large middle class residential space.

== History ==
After J P L Shenoy I.C.S. retired from his post as the Commissioner of the Corporation of Madras, the erstwhile Deputy Commissioner C. Narasimhan, the first non-I.C.S. man who succeeded him to the post, completed his vision and named the development as Shenoy Nagar.

Under the DMK government formed in 1967, the area got its first swimming pool. The Chintamani market was opened to alleviate the difficulties of commute to Triplicane and Parry's to buy supplies. The location of the market was the setting of a tragedy when lightning struck and killed three people.
