= Pachaiyappa's College metro station =

Chennai Metro's Green Line metro station

Pachaiyappa's College

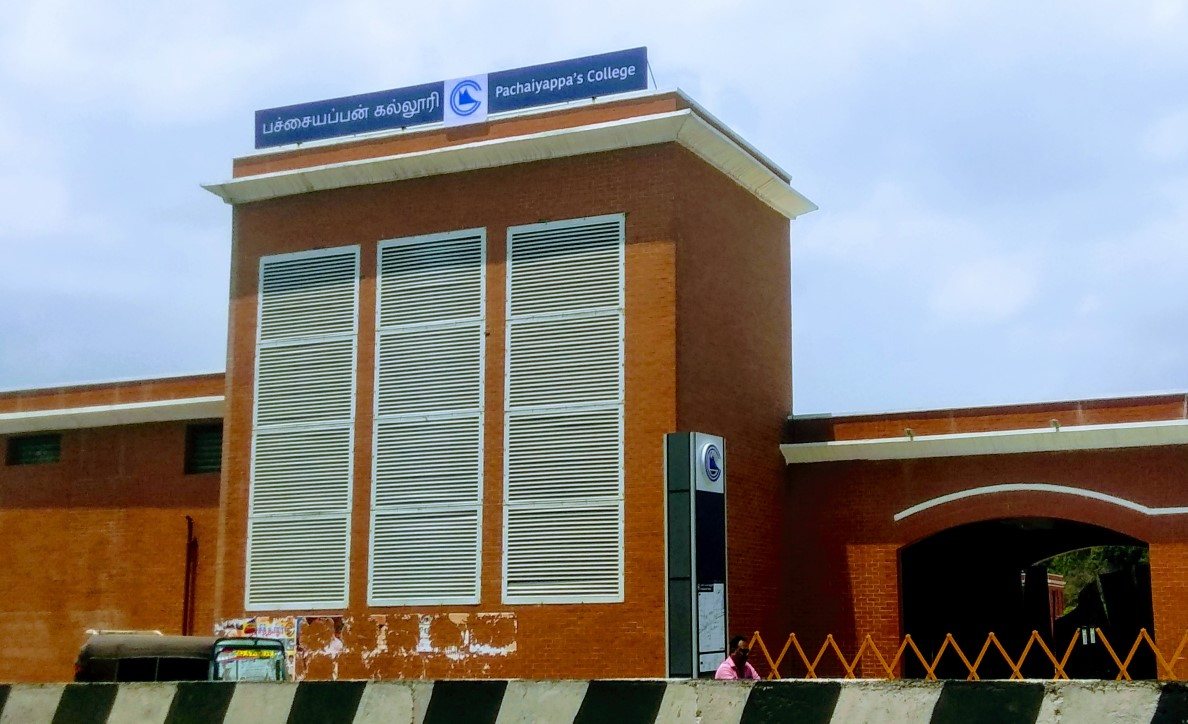

General information
- Location: Chetpet, Chennai, Tamil Nadu 600030
- Coordinates: 13.0755°N 80.2329°E
- System: Chennai Metro station
- Owner: Chennai Metro
- Operator: Chennai Metro Rail Limited (CMRL)
- Line: Green Line Inter Corridor Line
- Platforms: Island platform Platform-1 → St. Thomas Mount; Platform-2 → M.G.R Chennai Central
- Tracks: 2

Construction
- Structure type: Underground, Double Track
- Depth: 18 metres (59 ft)
- Parking: Available
- Cycle facilities: Free bicycle
- Accessible: Yes

Other information
- Station code: SPC

History
- Opened: 15 May 2017; 9 years ago
- Electrified: Single-phase 25 kV 50 Hz AC overhead catenary

Services
Preceding station	Chennai Metro	Following station
Kilpauk Medical College towards Chennai Central	Green Line	Shenoy Nagar towards St. Thomas Mount
Chennai Central Terminus	Blue Line (Inter-Corridor Service)	Shenoy Nagar towards Kilambakkam
Route map
Location

Pachaiyappa's College is an underground metro station on the South-East Corridor of the Green Line of Chennai Metro in Chennai, India. This was inaugurated on 14 May 2017. The station will serve the neighbourhoods of Kilpauk and Aminjikarai. The station has four entry and exit points.

== Station layout ==
G	Street level	Exit/Entrance
M	Mezzanine	Fare control, station agent, Ticket/token, shops
P	Platform 2 Northbound	Towards → Chennai Central; Next Station: Kilpauk Medical College
P	Island platform | Doors will open on the right
P	Platform 1 Southbound	Towards ← St. Thomas Mount; Next Station: Shenoy Nagar

=== Facilities ===
List of available ATM at Pachaiyappa's College metro station are

== Entry/Exit ==
Pachaiyappa's College metro station Entry/exits
Gate No-A1	Gate No-A2	Gate No-A3	Gate No-A4

== See also ==
- Chennai
- List of Chennai metro stations
- Chennai Metro
- Railway stations in Chennai
- Chennai Mass Rapid Transit System
- Chennai Monorail
- Chennai Suburban Railway
- Transport in Chennai
- Urban rail transit in India
- List of metro systems
