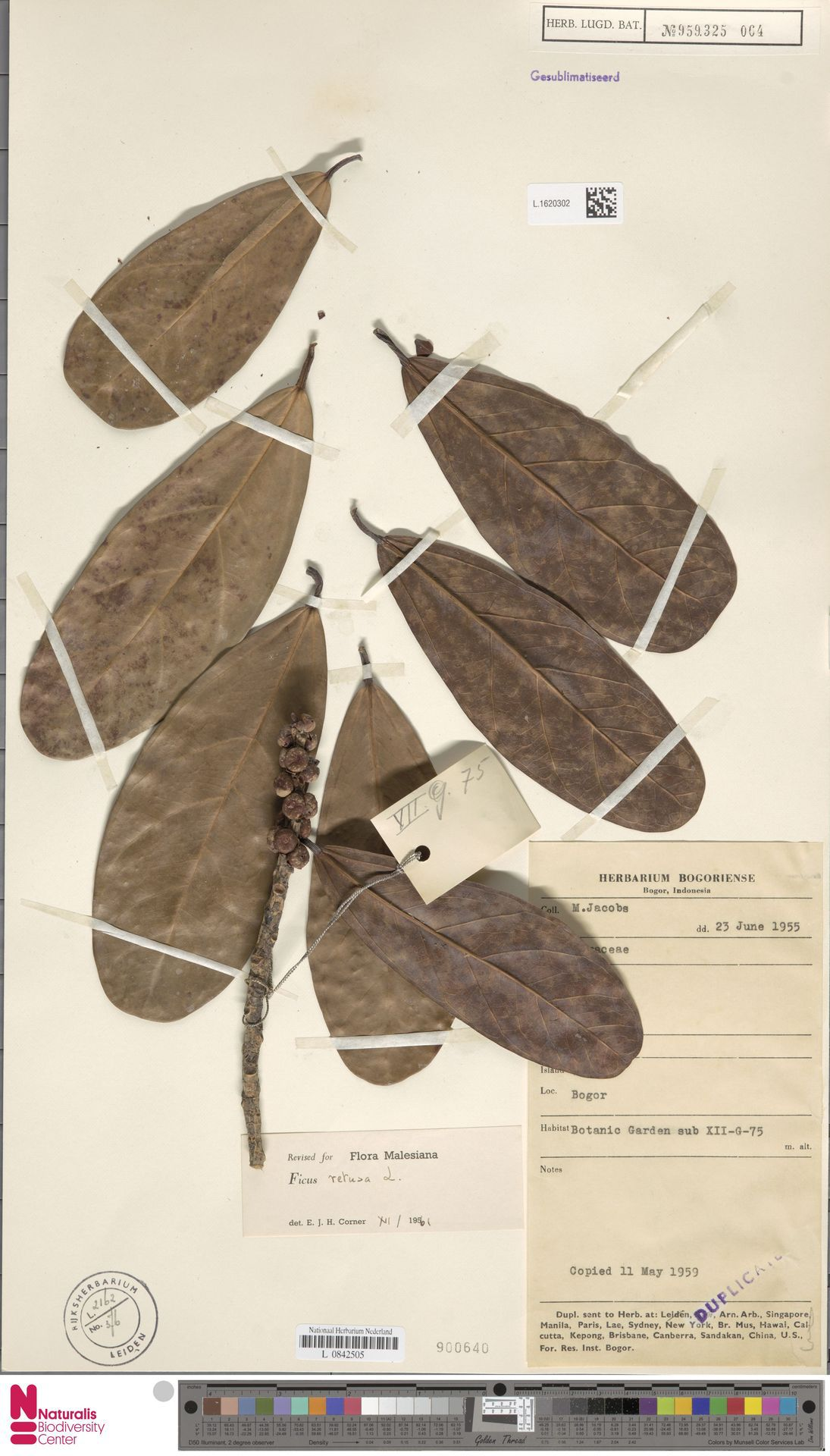

Conservation status
- Least Concern (IUCN 3.1)

Scientific classification
- Kingdom: Plantae
- Clade: Tracheophytes
- Clade: Angiosperms
- Clade: Eudicots
- Clade: Rosids
- Order: Rosales
- Family: Moraceae
- Genus: Ficus
- Species: F. retusa

Binomial name
- Ficus retusa L.

Synonyms
- Ficus elliptica Hook. ex Miq., nom. illeg. homonym. post.; Ficus retusa var. typica Domin; Ficus truncata (Miq.) Miq., nom. illeg. homonym. post.; Perula retusa (L.) Raf.; Urostigma retusum (L.) Gasp.; Urostigma truncatum Miq.

= Ficus retusa =

Species of fig

Ficus retusa is a species of evergreen woody plant in the fig genus. It is a tree native to Borneo, Java, and Peninsular Malaysia in the Malesian floristic region. The species name has been widely mis-applied to Ficus microcarpa.

The species was described by Carl Linnaeus in 1767.

== Description ==
Ficus retusa is a rapidly growing, rounded, broad-headed, evergreen shrub or tree that can reach 10 metres (33 ft) in height with an equal spread. The smooth, light grey trunk is quite striking, can grow to around 1 metre (3.3 ft) in diameter, and it firmly supports the massively spreading canopy.

The tree has glabrous obovate leaves, usually longer than 10 centimetres (3.9 in) and spirally arranged. It has a gray to reddish bark dotted with small, horizontal flecks, called lenticels, that are used by woody plant species for supplementary gas exchange through the bark. The name is commonly used to refer to ornamental indoor plants (for example bonsai) widely cultivated in temperate regions, but such plants generally belong to another species, Ficus microcarpa. The two species can be distinguished from the length of the leaf blade (usually 10–20 centimetres (3.9–7.9 in) for F. retusa, and usually less than 10 centimetres (3.9 in) for F. microcarpa but rarely up to 15 centimetres (5.9 in)).
