= Geography of Chennai =

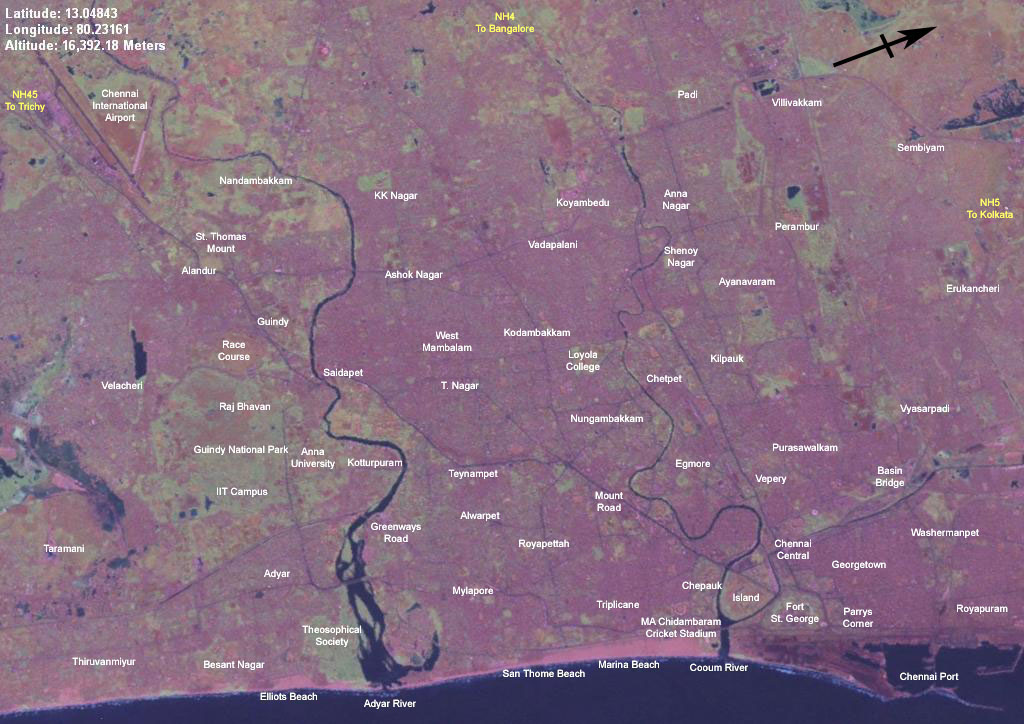
Chennai is situated on a flat coastal plain, as can be seen in this Landsat 7 map.

Chennai is located at 13.04°N 80.17°E on the southeast coast of India and in the northeast corner of Tamil Nadu. It is located on a flat coastal plain known as the Eastern Coastal Plains. The city has an average elevation of 6 metres (20 ft), its highest point being 60 m (200 ft). Chennai is 2,184 kilometres (1,357 miles) south of Delhi, 1,337 kilometres (831 miles) southeast of Mumbai, and 1,679 kilometers (1,043 miles) southwest of Kolkata by road.

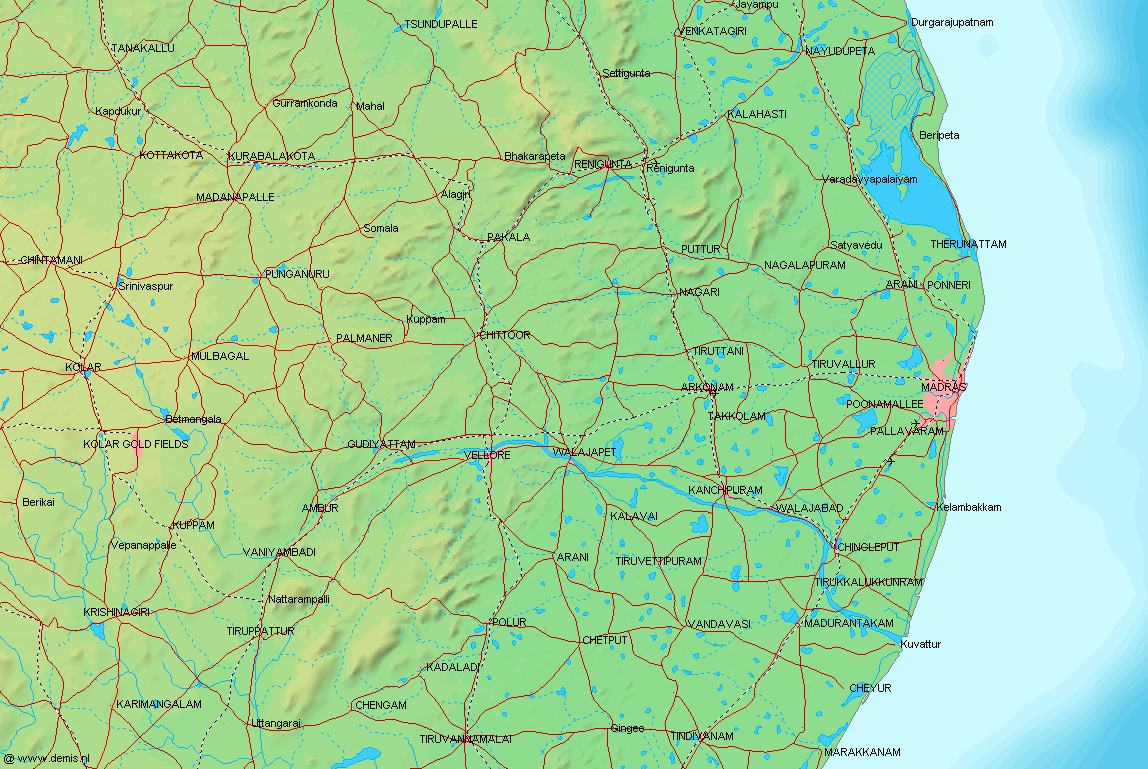
Chennai and surrounding towns

== Geology ==
The geology of Chennai comprises mostly clay, shale and sandstone. The city is classified into three regions based on geology, sandy areas, clayey areas and hard-rock areas. Sandy areas are found along the river banks and the coasts. Clayey regions cover most of the city. Hard rock areas are Guindy, Velachery, Adambakkam and a part of Saidapet. In sandy areas such as Tiruvanmiyur, Adyar, Kottivakkam, Santhome, George Town, Tondiarpet and the rest of coastal Chennai, rainwater run-off percolates very quickly. In clayey and hard rock areas, rainwater percolates slowly, but it is held by the soil for a longer time. The city's clayey areas include T. Nagar, West Mambalam, Anna Nagar, Perambur and Virugambakkam. The geology of the Chennai city and its surroundings derived from the map of the Geological Survey of India is shown in figure.

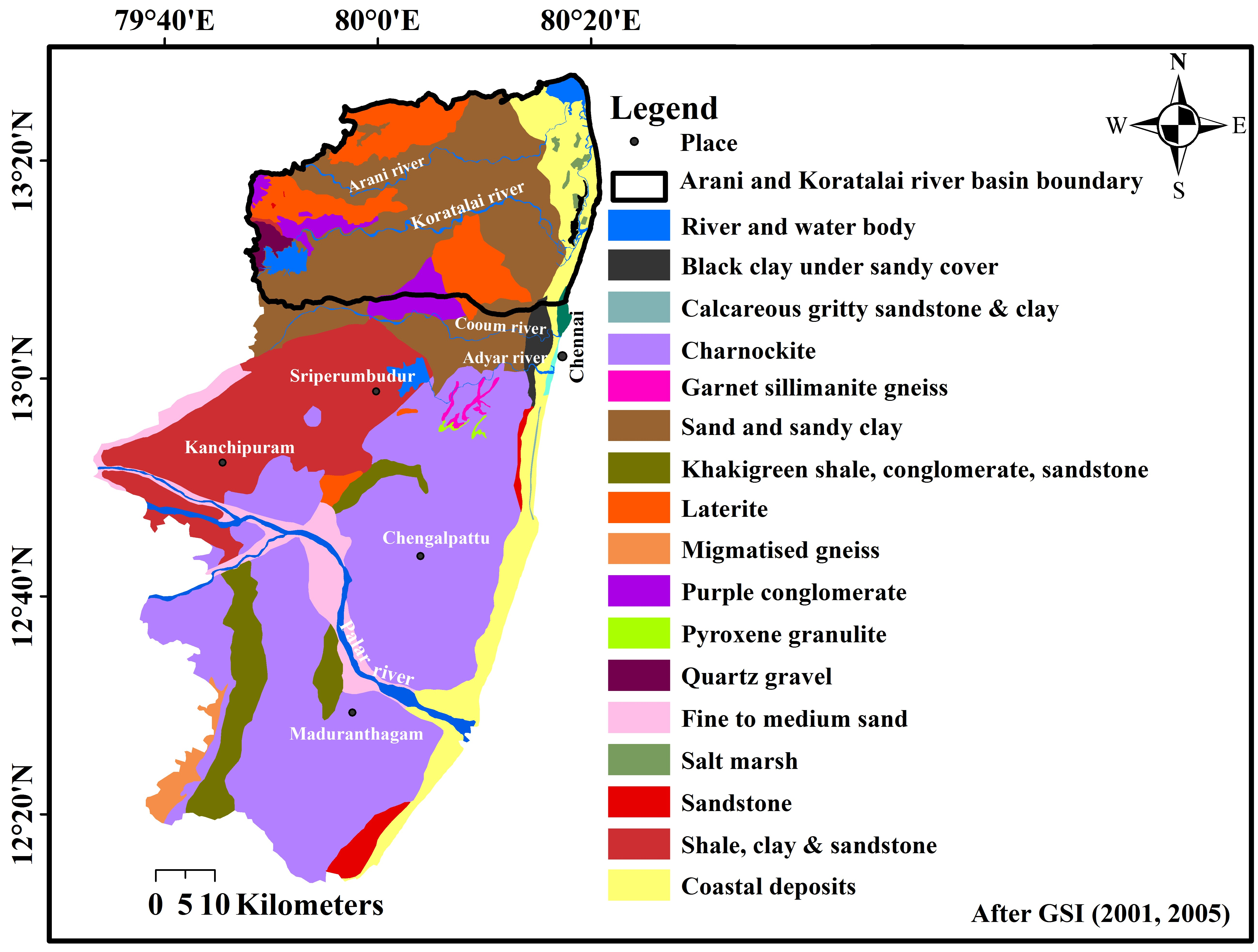
Geology of Chennai and surroundings (after GSI)

== Climate ==
Under the Köppen climate classification, Chennai has the dry-summer version of a tropical savanna climate (As), closely bordering the dry-winter version (Aw) due to a February average rainfall of 4.7 mm (0.19 in). Chennai lies on the thermal equator and is also coastal, which prevents extreme variation in seasonal temperature. For most of the year, the weather is hot and humid. The hottest part of the year is late May and early June, known locally as Agni Nakshatram ("fiery star") or as Kathiri Veyyil, with maximum temperatures around 38–42 °C (100–108 °F). The highest recorded temperature was 45 °C (113 °F) on 31 May 2003. The coldest time of the year is in December–January, with average temperature of 19–25 °C (66–77 °F) and the lowest recorded temperature of 13.9 °C (57.0 °F) on 11 December 1895 and 29 January 1905.

The average annual rainfall is about 1,400 mm (55 in). The city gets most of its seasonal rainfall from the north-east monsoon winds, from mid-September to mid-December while smaller amounts also come from the south-west monsoon winds from mid-June to mid-September. The dry season is between January and May, with March having the least average rainfall at 3.4 mm (0.13 in). Cyclones and depressions from the North Indian Ocean tropical cyclone in the Bay of Bengal sometimes hit the city. The highest annual rainfall recorded is 2,570 mm in 2005. The most prevailing winds in Chennai is the Southwesterly between the end of May to end of September and the Northeasterly during the rest of the year. Water inundation and flooding happen in low-lying areas during the season with significant flooding in 2015 and 2023.

Climate data for Chennai (Nungambakkam; rainfall from Chennai Airport), 1991–2020 normals, extremes 1901–present
Month	Jan	Feb	Mar	Apr	May	Jun	Jul	Aug	Sep	Oct	Nov	Dec	Year
Record high °C (°F)	34.4 (93.9)	36.7 (98.1)	40.6 (105.1)	42.8 (109.0)	45.0 (113.0)	43.3 (109.9)	41.1 (106.0)	40.0 (104.0)	38.9 (102.0)	39.4 (102.9)	35.4 (95.7)	33.0 (91.4)	45.0 (113.0)
Mean daily maximum °C (°F)	29.3 (84.7)	30.9 (87.6)	32.9 (91.2)	34.5 (94.1)	37.1 (98.8)	37.0 (98.6)	35.3 (95.5)	34.7 (94.5)	34.2 (93.6)	32.1 (89.8)	29.9 (85.8)	28.9 (84.0)	33.1 (91.6)
Daily mean °C (°F)	25.4 (77.7)	26.7 (80.1)	28.7 (83.7)	31.0 (87.8)	33.0 (91.4)	32.3 (90.1)	31.0 (87.8)	30.3 (86.5)	29.8 (85.6)	28.5 (83.3)	26.7 (80.1)	25.6 (78.1)	29.1 (84.4)
Mean daily minimum °C (°F)	21.2 (70.2)	22.2 (72.0)	24.2 (75.6)	26.6 (79.9)	28.0 (82.4)	27.5 (81.5)	26.4 (79.5)	25.9 (78.6)	25.6 (78.1)	24.6 (76.3)	23.1 (73.6)	21.9 (71.4)	24.8 (76.6)
Record low °C (°F)	13.9 (57.0)	15.0 (59.0)	16.7 (62.1)	20.0 (68.0)	21.1 (70.0)	20.6 (69.1)	21.0 (69.8)	20.5 (68.9)	20.6 (69.1)	16.7 (62.1)	15.0 (59.0)	13.9 (57.0)	13.9 (57.0)
Average rainfall mm (inches)	20.0 (0.79)	4.7 (0.19)	3.4 (0.13)	17.5 (0.69)	49.7 (1.96)	75.4 (2.97)	113.1 (4.45)	141.4 (5.57)	143.9 (5.67)	278.3 (10.96)	377.3 (14.85)	183.7 (7.23)	1,408.4 (55.45)
Average rainy days	1.4	0.6	0.2	1.0	1.8	4.5	6.7	8.8	7.4	10.6	11.5	5.7	60.2
Average relative humidity (%) (at 17:30 IST)	67	66	67	70	68	63	65	66	71	76	76	71	69
Mean monthly sunshine hours	232.5	240.1	291.4	294.0	300.7	234.0	142.6	189.1	195.0	257.3	261.0	210.8	2,848.5
Mean daily sunshine hours	7.5	8.5	9.4	9.8	9.7	7.8	4.6	6.1	6.5	8.3	8.7	6.8	7.8
Percentage possible sunshine	82	91	87	82	72	54	46	48	54	52	46	62	64
Average ultraviolet index	10	11	12	12	12	12	12	12	11	11	10	9	11
Source 1: India Meteorological Department
Source 2: Tokyo Climate Center (mean temperatures 1991–2020)

Chennai has been ranked 41st best "National Clean Air City" (under Category 1 >10L Population cities) in India.

== Water bodies ==
Two rivers meander through Chennai, the Cooum River (or Koovam) in the central region and the Adyar River in the southern region. Both rivers are heavily polluted with effluents and trash from domestic and commercial sources. The Adyar, which is much less polluted than the Cooum, is de-silted and cleaned periodically by the state government. A protected estuary of the Adyar forms the natural habitat of several species of birds and animals. The Buckingham Canal, 4 km (2.5 mi) inland, travels parallel to the coast, linking the two rivers. The Otteri Nullah, an east–west stream runs through north Chennai and meets the Buckingham Canal at Basin Bridge. Several lakes of varying size are located on the western fringes of the city. Red Hills, Sholavaram and Chembarambakkam Lake supply Chennai with potable water. Groundwater sources are mostly brackish. A study by the Department of Geology, Anna University, based on a city map of 1893, has revealed that there were nearly 60 large waterbodies in the core of then Madras. The study traced the shrinking and vanished waterbodies through a series of city maps.

Historically, Chennai has faced a problem of water supply shortages as no big river flows through it with a resulting over-reliance on annual monsoon rains to replenish water reservoirs. The city's ground water levels have been depleted to very low levels in many areas. Many residents buy their drinking water. An earlier Veeranam project was unsuccessful in solving the city's water supply shortages, but the New Veeranam project which became operational in September 2004 has greatly reduced dependency on distant sources. In recent years however, due to heavy and consistent monsoon rains and the implementation of rainwater harvesting (RWH) techniques by Chennai Metrowater at their Anna Nagar Rain Centre, water shortages have been reduced significantly, and this has led Chennai to be a model of RWH technology for other cities. Moreover, newer projects like the Telugu Ganga canal project that brings water from water-surplus rivers like the Krishna River in Andhra Pradesh have eased water supply shortages. The city is also constructing sea water desalination plants to further ease water supply shortages.

== Layout ==
For administrative purposes Chennai is divided into five talukas; namely Egmore-Nungambakam, Fort Tondiarpet, Mambalam-Guindy, Mylapore-Triplicane and Perambur-Purasawalkkam.

The Chennai Metropolitan area consists of five districts namely Chennai city and the districts of Kanchipuram, Chengalpattu, Thiruvallur and Ranipet. The city area covers an area of 476 km^{2} (184 sq mi). The metropolitan area covers 1,177 km^{2} (454 sq mi). The city is divided on the basis of composition into four major parts: North, Central, South and West.

North Chennai is primarily an industrial area. Central Chennai is the commercial heart of the city and the downtown area. South Chennai and West Chennai, previously predominantly residential areas are fast turning into commercial areas, hosting a large number of IT and financial companies. The city is fast expanding along the Old Mahabalipuram Road, GST Road, Sriperumbdur, Koyambedu and Ambattur.

The Chennai Metropolitan Development Authority has drafted a Second Master Plan for Chennai, that aims to develop a satellite townships around the city. Contiguous satellite towns include Mahabalipuram to the south, Chengalpattu and Maraimalai Nagar to the south west, Kanchipuram town, Sriperumpudur, Tiruvallur and Arakkonam to the west.
