= Natesan Park =

Park in Chennai, India

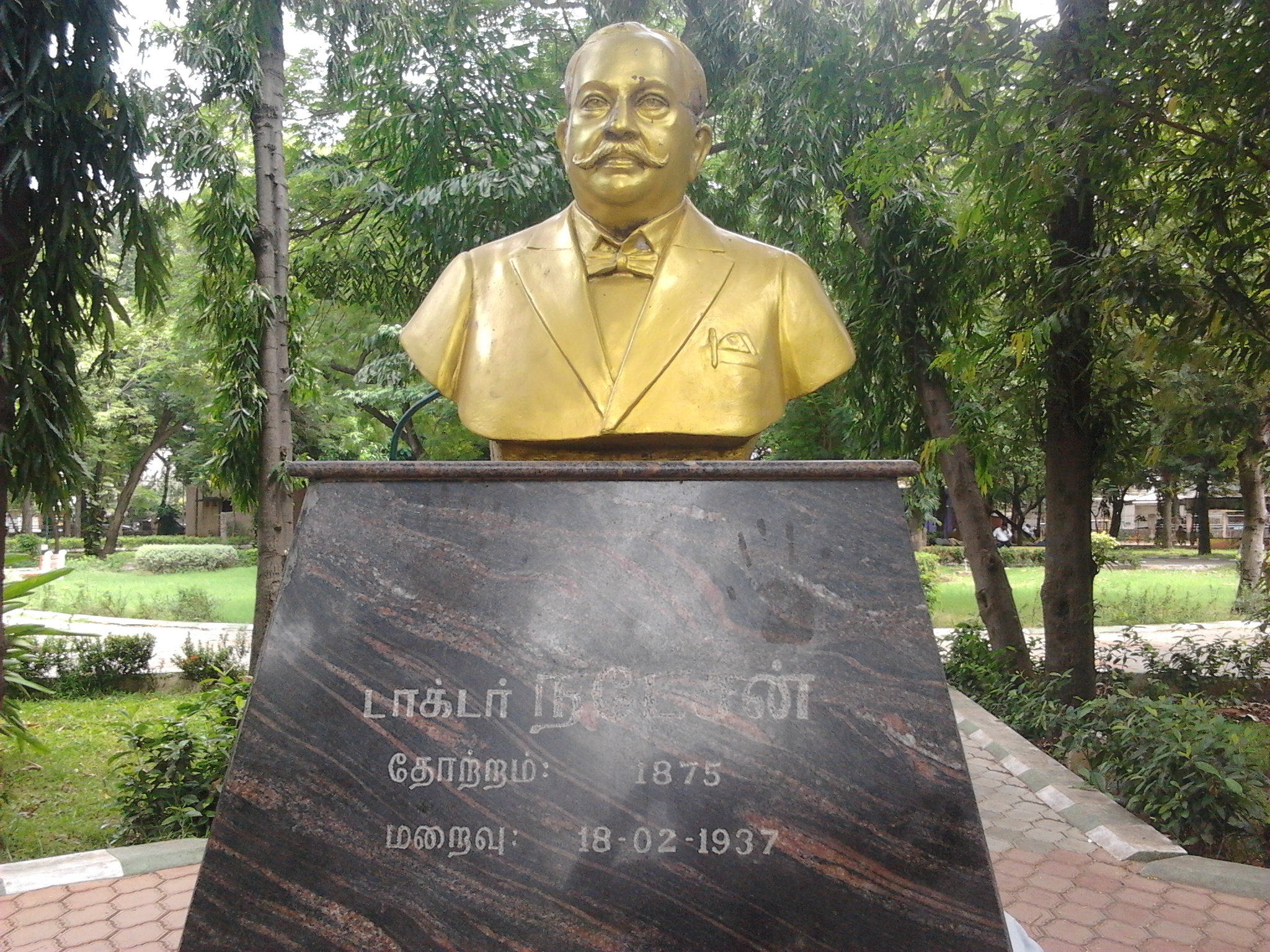
- Statue of Dr. Natesan at the park
- Interactive map of Natesan Park
- Type: Urban park
- Location: T.Nagar, Chennai, India
- Coordinates: 13°2′15″N 80°14′10″E
- Area: 4 acres (1.6 hectares)
- Created: 13 September 1950
- Operator: Corporation of Chennai
- Status: Open all year

Natesan Park is a park in T.Nagar, Chennai, India. It is located on Venkatanarayana Road. The park covers an area of 4 acres (1.6 hectares) and was opened to the public on 13 September 1950 by the then Minister of Agriculture, A. B. Shetty. It is the only park maintained by the Chennai Corporation that has a separate tennis court for coaching children.

There is also a plant propagation centre and play zone for children. It is a popular spot for morning walks for the local residents. Plant varieties found in the park include Croton, Aralia, Bougainvillea, Acalypha, Caesalpinia pulcherrima, mahogany, neem, gulmohar, Cassia fistula and foliage trees like pungam, palms, Ficus religiosa and Thespesia.

== See also ==
- Parks in Chennai
