= Madhavaram Botanical Garden =

Botanical garden in Chennai, India

- Interactive map of Madhavaram Botanical Garden
- Type: Urban park
- Location: Madhavaram, Chennai, India
- Coordinates: 13.149122°N 80.242935°E
- Area: 20.21 acres (8.18 hectares)
- Created: October 2018; 7 years ago
- Operator: Tamil Nadu Horticultural Development Agency (TANHODA)
- Status: Open

Madhavaram Botanical Garden is a botanical garden in Chennai, India, set up by the horticulture department of the Government of Tamil Nadu. The garden, the second botanical garden in Chennai after the Semmozhi Poonga, is the largest botanical garden in the city.

== History ==
The foundation stone for the garden was laid on 15 September 2010. Initially planned to sprawl an area of 28.51 acres (11.54 hectares), the park area was reduced to 20.21 acres (8.18 hectares) when opened. The garden was built at a cost of ₹ 57.3 million.

== The garden ==
The garden is located at the State horticulture farm in Madhavaram Milk Colony. The garden is broadly divided into sections for fruits, medicinal plants, indoor plants, cactus and ornamental arboretum, besides one for protected cultivation. The garden also has a small bridge has been built to attract birds from where visitors will get a view of the lake. The garden will have nearly 400 species of plants, including about 200 ornamental plants. A glasshouse similar to the one in the garden at Udhagamandalam will also be created, with different types of gardens, including herbal, flowers, bonsai and trellis gardens, in addition to mazes, a play area for children, cascades and many fountains. The garden will also have an open-air theatre with a capacity to seat nearly 150 people. There will also be a nursery outlet at the garden. There are also plans to create a section for 27 birthstars (nakshatram) as specified in the Hindu almanac.

As part of the project, the Horticulture Training Centre in Madhavaram will also be upgraded to Horticulture Management Institute at a cost of ₹ 39 million.

== See also ==
- Parks in Chennai
- List of botanical gardens in India
