= Shenoy Nagar metro station =

Chennai Metro's Green Line metro station

Shenoy Nagar

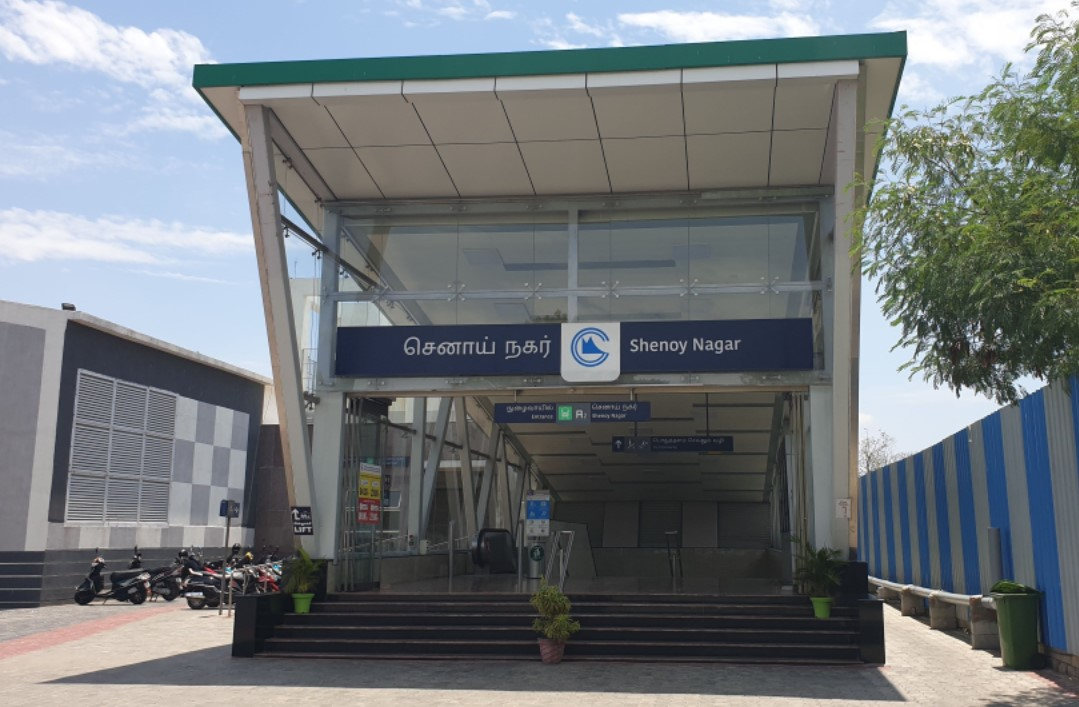

General information
- Location: Bharathi Puram, Shenoy Nagar, Chennai, Tamil Nadu 600030
- Coordinates: 13.078799°N 80.225093°E
- System: Chennai Metro station
- Owner: Chennai Metro
- Operator: Chennai Metro Rail Limited (CMRL)
- Line: Green Line Inter Corridor Line
- Platforms: Island platform Platform-1 → St. Thomas Mount; Platform-2 → M.G.R Chennai Central
- Tracks: 2

Construction
- Structure type: Underground, Double Track
- Depth: 18 metres (59 ft)
- Parking: Available
- Cycle facilities: Free bicycle
- Accessible: Yes

Other information
- Station code: SSN

History
- Opened: 15 May 2017; 9 years ago
- Electrified: Single-phase 25 kV 50 Hz AC overhead catenary

Services
Preceding station	Chennai Metro	Following station
Pachaiyappa's College towards Chennai Central	Green Line	Anna Nagar East towards St. Thomas Mount
Pachaiyappa's College towards Chennai Central	Blue Line (Inter-Corridor Service)	Anna Nagar East towards Kilambakkam
Route map
Location

Shenoy Nagar is an underground metro station on the South-East Corridor of the Green Line of Chennai Metro in Chennai, India. This was inaugurated on 14 May 2017. The station will serve the neighbourhoods of Shenoy Nagar and Aminjikarai. The station has four entry and exit points.

== Station layout ==
G	Street level	Exit/Entrance
M	Mezzanine	Fare control, station agent, Ticket/token, shops
P	Platform 2 Northbound	Towards → Chennai Central; Next Station: Pachaiyappa's College
P	Island platform | Doors will open on the right
P	Platform 1 Southbound	Towards ← St. Thomas Mount; Next Station: Anna Nagar East

== See also ==
- Shenoy Nagar
- List of Chennai metro stations
- Chennai Metro
- Railway stations in Chennai
- Chennai Mass Rapid Transit System
- Chennai Monorail
- Chennai Suburban Railway
- Transport in Chennai
- Urban rail transit in India
- List of metro systems
