= Chengalpattu (disambiguation) =

Chengalpattu (formerly Chingleput) is a city and the headquarters of Chengalpattu district in Tamil Nadu, India.

Chengalpattu may also refer to:

- Chengalpattu district, a district of Tamil Nadu, India
- Chengalpattu taluk, a taluk (sub-district) of Tamil Nadu, India
- Chengalpattu (state assembly constituency), a state assembly constituency of Tamil Nadu
- Chengalpattu (Lok Sabha constituency), a Lok Sabha constituency in the Indian parliament
- Chingleput District (Madras Presidency), British India
  - Chingleput Ryots' Case
- Chengalpattu Medical College, an educational institution in the city
- Chengalpattu Junction railway station, a railway junction in the city
- Chingleput Gopinath, Indian cricketer
- Chingleput Ranganathan, Indian carnatic singer and musician
