= Saidapet taluk =

Administrative division in British India

Saidapet
- Taluk
- Saidapet

Area
  - Total: 890 km^{2} (340 sq mi)

Population (1991)
  - Total: 1,410,492
  - Density: 1,600/km^{2} (4,100/sq mi)

Historical population
Year	Pop.	±%
1951	287,471	—
1961	393,836	+37.0%
1971	693,059	+76.0%
1981	926,026	+33.6%
1991	1,410,492	+52.3%
Source: Census of India 1951-1991

Saidapet taluk was a taluk of Chengalpattu district in the Madras Presidency of the British Empire, that existed from 1798 to 1997. The headquarters of the taluk was the town of Saidapet. The taluk largely comprised the suburbs of Madras city. It was surrounded by Ponneri taluk in the north, Tiruvallur taluk in the north-west, Poonamallee taluk in the west, Sriperumbudur taluk to the south-west and Chengalpattu taluk in the south. The Bay of Bengal lay to the east. Saidapet taluk completely surrounded Madras city on all the three sides with the Bay of Bengal on the fourth. When Chengalpattu district was bifurcated into Kanchipuram and Tiruvallur districts in 1997, Saidapet taluk was also bifurcated into Ambattur taluk of Tiruvallur district and the Tambaram taluk of Kanchipuram district. The area of Saidapet taluk was 342 mi^{2} (890 km^{2}) in 1871.

== History ==
In 1780, the East India Company acquired Saidapet, along with the rest of the jaghire of Chingleput, from the Nawab of the Carnatic, accusing the Nawab of maladministration and sub-divided it into sixteen pergannas for revenue administration.

In 1794, the district of Chingleput was reorganized and put under the charge of a District Collector stationed at Karunguzhi. Saidapet was made a taluk under the charge of a tahsildar. The Saidapet taluk offices functioned from Saidapet till 1997 even though the town of Saidapet itself had been included within Corporation of Madras and Madras district limits in 1946. Saidapet taluk was abolished in 1997 and sub-divided into Ambattur and Tambaram taluks.
