= Puliyur Kottam =

Puliyur Kōttam was an administrative subdivision (kōttam) of Tondaimandalam which is known from inscriptions particularly from the period when Tondaimandalam, also known as Jayamkondacholamandalam, was a viceroyalty of the Chola Empire. Historian K. V. Raman equated kōttams with present-day districts. Though the boundaries of Puliyur Kottam varied greatly, the district of Puliyur Kōttam roughly corresponded to the southern part of the city of Chennai, India. Each kōttam might have had a fort as its administrative centre and the commander of the fort probably exercised civil as well as military authority over the towns and villages within his assigned territory. The fort (kōttam) that formed the administrative centre of Puliyur Kottam might have been located in Puliyur, near present-day Kodambakkam.

== Sub-divisions ==
Just like other kottams of the Chola Empire, Puliyur Kottam was sub-divided into twenty four nadus. K. V. Raman compared kōttams with present-day districts and nadus with talukas.

- Amarur Nadu
- Kottur Nadu (present-day Kotturpuram, Mylapore, Adyar, Thiruvanmiyur and Velachery)
- Kundrathur Nadu (present-day Kundrathur, Kovur)
- Mangadu Nadu (present-day Mangadu, Poonamallee)
- Nedungunra Nadu (present-day Vandalur)
- Perur Nadu (present-day Porur, Manapakkam and Kolapakkam)
- Puliyur Nadu (present-day Kodambakkam, Vadapalani, Ashok Nagar, K. K. Nagar, Mambalam, T. Nagar)
- Surattur Nadu (present-day Adambakkam, Pammal, Thiruneermalai, Tambaram, Tirusulam)
