= Little Mount, Chennai =

Neighbourhood in Chennai, India

Little Mount
- Neighbourhood
- Little Mount, Chennai, Tamil Nadu
- Coordinates: 13°01′00″N 80°13′38″E
- Country: India
- State: Tamil Nadu
- District: Chennai
- Elevation: 54 m (177 ft)

Languages
  - Official: Tamil, English
  - Speech: Tamil, English
- Time zone: UTC+5:30 (IST)
- PIN: 600015
- Telephone code: +9144xxxxxxxx
- Other Neighbourhoods: Saidapet, Guindy, Kotturpuram, T. Nagar, Mambalam, Kodambakkam, Nandanam and Nungambakkam
- Corporation: Greater Chennai Corporation
- District Collector: Tmt. M. Aruna, I. A. S.
- LS: Chennai South
- VS: Saidapet
- MP: Thamizhachi Thangapandian
- MLA: Ma. Subramanian

Chinnamalai, translated in English as Little Mount, is a hillock that lies on the bank of Adayar River in the Saidapet taluk of Chennai, Tamil Nadu, India. Anna Salai, previously called Mount Road, is a long road in Chennai that stretches between Chennai northern side to the southern side at Little Mount. There is a proposed footbridge, which will allow pedestrian access to Little Mount avoiding road traffic; this will be 100 m away from the already existing walkway bridge, and built by the State Highways department of Tamil Nadu.

Little Mount now is a mixed-use residential and commercial area. The neighbourhood houses the IX Metropolitan Magistrates Court (Saidapet). Other Governmental offices located on the periphery of Little Mount include Raj Bhavan (the residence of the governor of Tamil Nadu), the headquarters of the state's Highways Department, and Panagal Maligai, which houses several government offices.

Current developments in and around Little Mount include the New Life Assembly of God (NLAG) Church, Checkers Hotel, Lemon Tree Hotel, and the Temple Steps office complex.

Little Mount is a stop on Line 1 of the Chennai Metro that runs between Washermanpet and the Airport.

== Overview ==
Little Mount is a small hillock, about 24 m in height, located on the south bank of the Adyar River near the Marmalong Bridge in Saidapet. The actual hillock is difficult to make out because of all the surrounding commercial and residential buildings. Along with the nearby St. Thomas Mount, Little Mount is located on the busy GST Road that runs through southwestern Chennai.

There is a cave on Little Mount where, according to tradition, St. Thomas lived for some time as a refuge from persecution. Of the three sites in Chennai associated with St. Thomas, Little Mount holds the least religious significance. Two churches stand on the hill today. One is the old Portuguese-built church dedicated to Our Lady of Good Health, which was built in 1551. The cave is accessible through this church. The other is a newer church built in 1971 or 1972, replacing the older parish church.

== St. Thomas ==
=== Other organizations of the church ===
==== Our Lady of Health School ====
This school was started with the purpose of providing education in English medium for the poor residents of the Little Mount parish. This school has only primary section and after fifth class students usually move on to other schools for continuing their education.

==== Immaculate Conception convent ====
The Immaculate Conception (IC) convent is located behind the church and near the entrance to Holy Land.

==== Missionaries of Charity (Brothers) - Karunai Illam ====
Karunai Illam provides a home for the destitute people who are differently disabled, both mentally and physically. It is run by brothers of Missionaries of Charity. Missionaries of Charity, Brothers was founded in 1963 by Mother Teresa to do work similar to the Sisters of Missionaries of Charity.

==== Ozanam Health Center ====
This health center was started at the initiative of Society of St. Vincent dePaul of Our Lady of Health Church. It was started at a time when common diseases were spreading among the poor people and doctors were difficult to find. It seeks to provide consultation and treatment to poor people for free or at nominal cost.

==== St. Thomas Community Hall ====
A small non-airconditioned community hall was constructed by the Church for use by its parishioners. It is built over two floors and has a very small car park. The first floor can seat about 300 people and the dining ground floor can seat about 100. Cars are often parked outside the facility in the land belonging to Church. It is not available during the Church festival period.

==== Catholic graveyard ====
A graveyard used for burying the dead parishioners is located near the newly constructed meetinghouse of the Church of Jesus Christ of Latter-day Saints.

== New Life Assembly of God ==
Rev. Dr. David Mohan is the senior pastor of the church. It is one of the biggest Assemblies of God congregation churches in Tamil Nadu, with nearly 55,000 people attending Sunday services in the church. Rev. Dr. Chadwick Samuel, who is the eldest son of Pastor Mohan, serves the English congregation. The church is located across the Saidapet Bridge Junction connecting Rajbhavan Road towards Anna University, Adayar and GST Road Towards Guindy, Kathipara Junction.

== Church of Jesus of Latter-day Saints ==
There a meetinghouse for the Church of Jesus Christ of Latter-day Saints is under construction and is built over a property previously owned by Our Lady of Health Church.

== Areas of Little Mount ==
Little Mount includes several neighborhoods that were created during different periods. The Arokia Matha Nagar 1st & 2nd Street, LDG road, and Taluk office road are probably the oldest neighborhoods. The Thomas Nagar, Srinagar Colony, Rangarajapuram, Bishop Colony were created much later.

== Eat outs ==
There are many places to choose from. A landmark lower-middle-class place is Hotel Ashok Bhavan, on the Velacherry road. It serves good vegetarian food. Other places include Hotel Adyar Anantha Bhavan, Wangs Kitchen, French Loaf and Mount Palace. Sri Krishna Sweets near court. A Domino's Pizza outlet is located near the Halda junction. Hotel Ponnusamy has also opened an outlet just opposite the Domino's Pizza. Close by are five star hotels including Park Hyatt and the SRM hotel. There is a Lemon Tree hotel and a Cafe Coffee Day too.

== MTC Bus Depot ==
MTC set up the Saidapet bus depot on 08-03-74. It operates about 116 buses and services 107 routes.

== Connectivity ==
Little Mount is well connected by MTC bus services all round the clock. Several buses pass through Little Mount to various parts of city and even distant suburbs. In addition, there are several share autos that operate on short routes passing through Little Mount.

Little Mount is connected by Line 1 of the Chennai Metro which runs from Washermanpet to the Airport. The station is located between Guindy and Saidapet and is the first elevated station when heading towards the Airport.

== See also ==
- Little Mount Shrine
- Parangimalai
