= Kodambakkam Bridge =

Road bridge in Chennai, India

Coordinates: 13.0541°N 80.2309°E

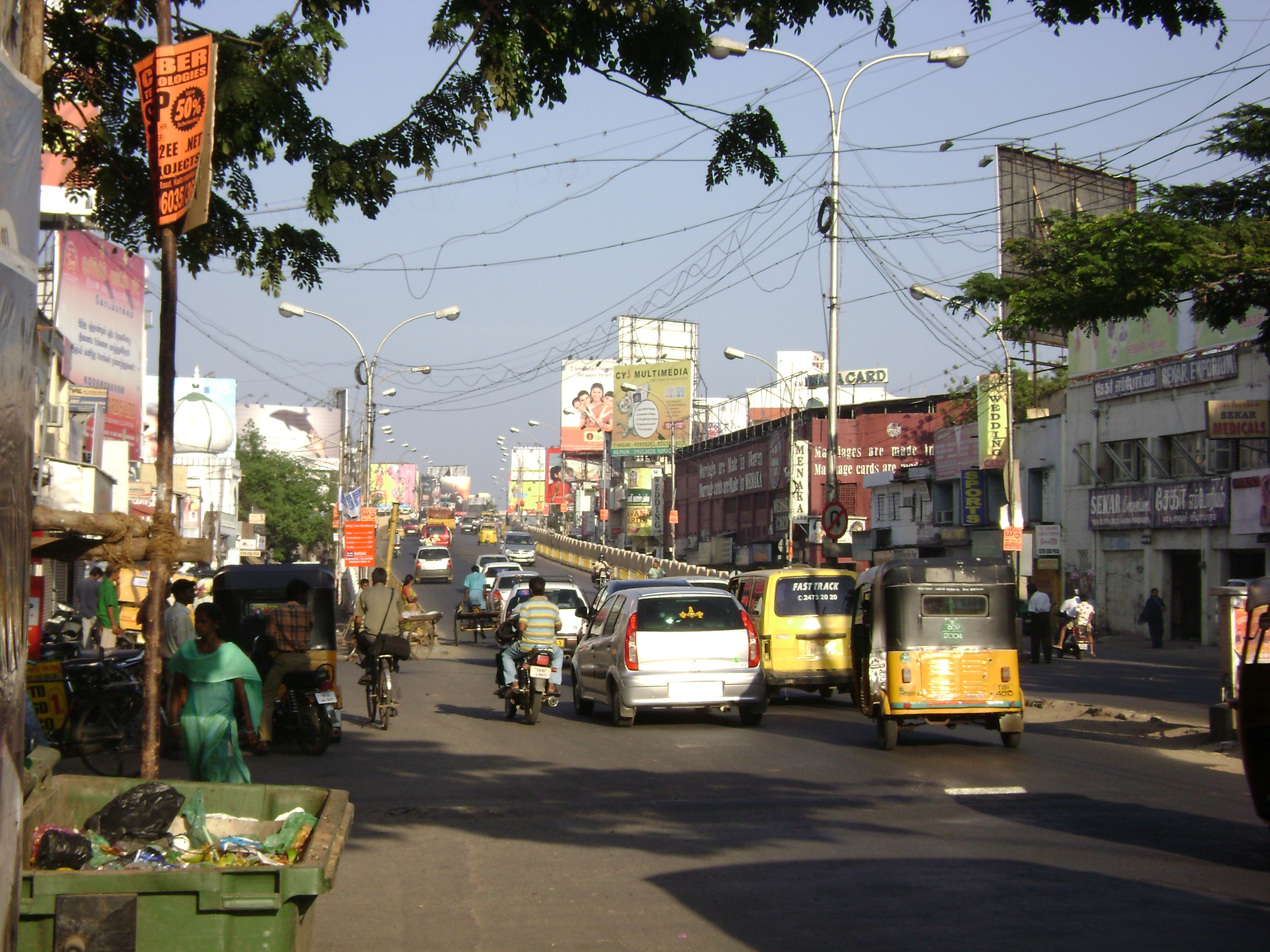
Kodambakkam Overbridge

Kodambakkam Bridge is a road overbridge in the city of Chennai, India. Opened in 1965, it is one of the oldest overbridges in the city. The bridge has a length of 623 meters.

== History ==
Prior to the construction of the bridge, there was a railway crossing at Kodambakkam, one of the busiest in the city. Choked by heavy traffic, the construction of a bridge was first proposed in the Lok Sabha in the late 1950s. Eventually, the Madras State Highways Department took up the construction of a bridge in September 1963 and completed it in September 1965.
