= Chingleput District (Madras Presidency) =

District in the Madras Presidency of British India

Coordinates: 12.684°N 79.983°E

Chengalpattu District Chengalpattu
- District of the Madras Presidency
- 1793–2003
- Flag

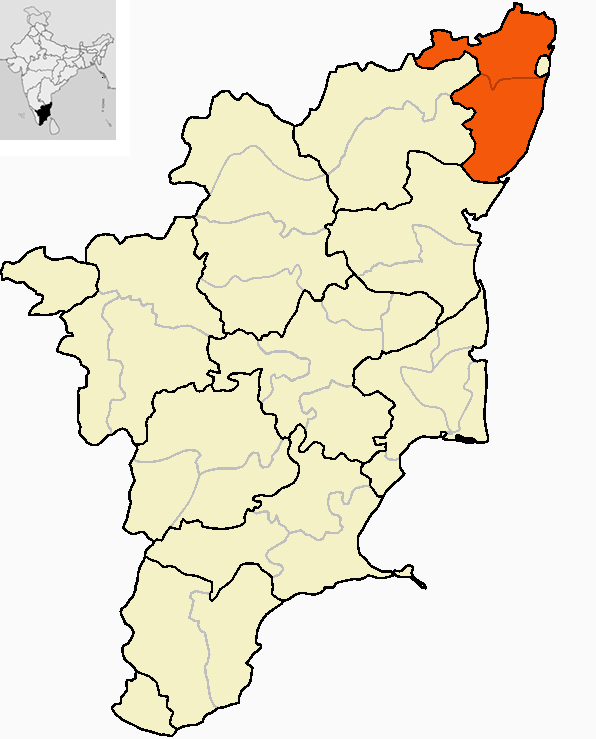
- Location of Chingleput district at the time of the formation of Madras State in 1956
- Capital: Carungooly (1794 - 1825, 1835 - 1859), Kanchipuram (1825 - 1835, 1968 - 1997), Saidapet (1859 - 1968)
- Area
  - 1901: 7,974.5 km^{2} (3,079.0 sq mi)
- Population
  - 1901: 1,312,122
- History
  - Collectorates merged into a single district: 1793
  - Bifurcated into the districts of Kanchipuram and Tiruvallur: 2003
| Preceded by | Succeeded by |
| Nawab of the Carnatic | Kanchipuram district; Tiruvallur district |
- This article incorporates text from a publication now in the public domain: Chisholm, Hugh, ed. (1911). "Chingleput". Encyclopædia Britannica. Vol. 6 (11th ed.). Cambridge University Press. p. 233.

Chingleput district was a district in the Madras Presidency of British India. It covered the area of the present-day districts of Kanchipuram, Chengalpattu and Tiruvallur and parts of Chennai city. It was sub-divided into six taluks with a total area of 7,970 square kilometres (3,079 sq mi). The first capital was the town of Karunguzhi, with an interruption between 1825 and 1835, administrative headquarters were transferred to Kanchipuram. In 1859, the capital Saidapet, now a neighbourhood in the city of Chennai, was made the administrative headquarters of the district.

== History ==
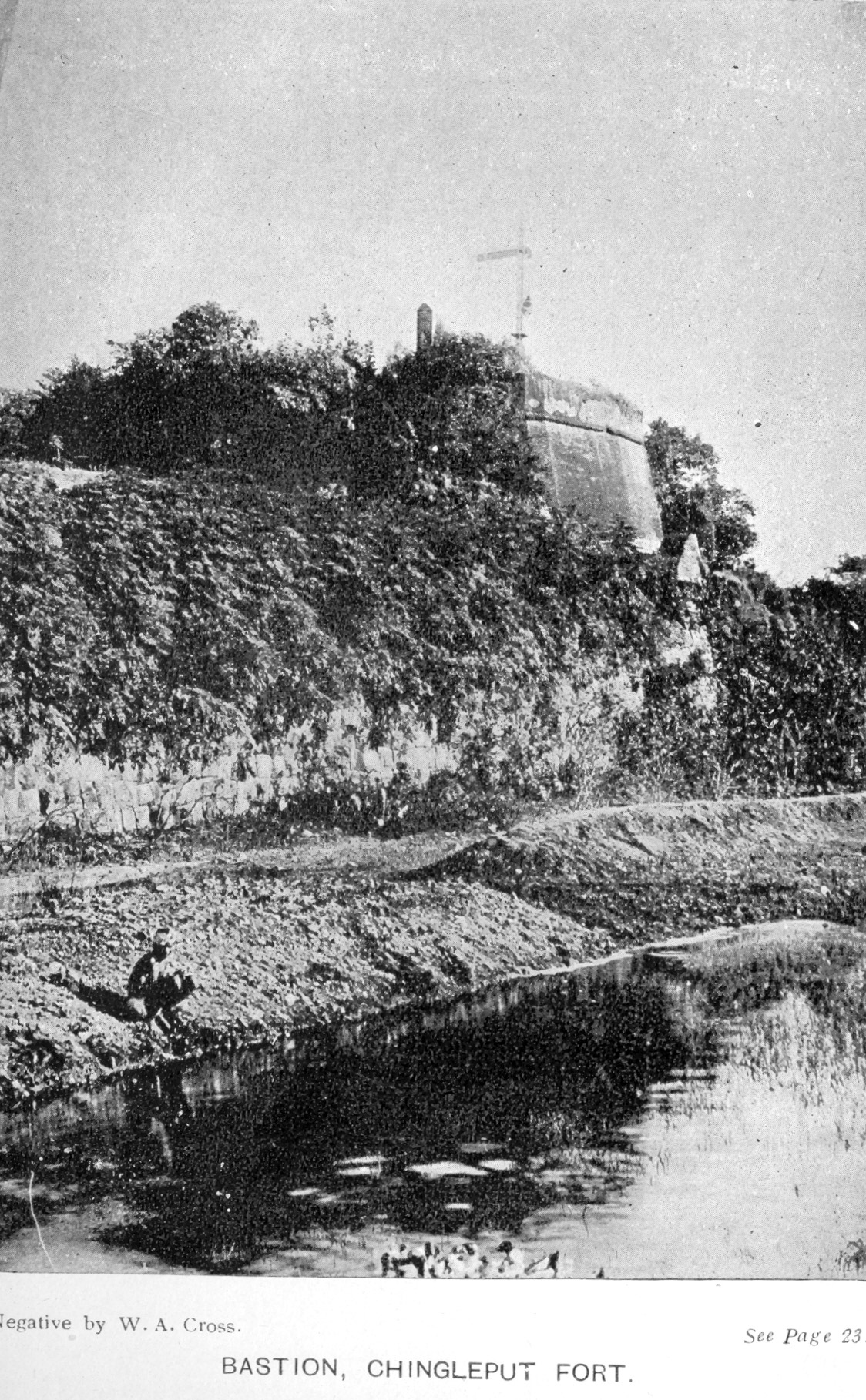
View of Chingleput Fort in 1913. The fort was the scene of the Battle of Chingleput in 1752

Excavations made by Robert Bruce Foote indicate that the region was inhabited in the Stone Age. During the end of first millennium B. C, it was under the Thondaiman kings. The Pallavas with their capital at Kanchi came to power in about 500 A. D. When the Pallava kingdom began to decline, the region was conquered by the Western Gangas in about 760 A. D. Chingleput was ruled by the Rashtrakutas, Cholas and the Kakatiyas of Warangal until the 13th century AD when it fell to the Delhi Sultanate. Chingleput area was conquered by the Vijayanagar Empire which ruled the region from 1393 till 1565 and from 1565 till 1640 as the kingdom of Chandragiri.

The area was annexed by the Mughals in 1687 and was later conquered by the Nawab of the Carnatic. In 1763, Chingleput was ceded to the British East India Company by Mohammad Ali, the then Nawab of the Carnatic. It was the site of the Carnatic Wars and was frequently taken by Tipu Sultan during the last years of the 18th century. In 1801, the Nawab of the Carnatic, finally, relinquished complete sovereignty over the region to the British East India Company.

After the independence of India, the district became part in 1950 of the newly named Madras State. As a result of the 1956 States Reorganisation Act, the state's boundaries were re-organised following linguistic lines. Madras State was finally renamed Tamil Nadu on 14 January 1969.

== Taluks ==
Chingleput district was made of eight taluks:

- Chingleput (Area: 1,130 square kilometres (436 sq mi); Headquarters: Chingleput)
- Conjeevaram (Area: 1,330 square kilometres (514 sq mi); Headquarters: Conjeevaram)
- Madurantakam (Area: 1,800 square kilometres (696 sq mi); Headquarters: Madurantakam)
- Ponneri (Area: 900 square kilometres (347 sq mi); Headquarters: Ponneri)
- Saidapet (Area: 890 square kilometres (342 sq mi); Headquarters: Saidapet)
- Tiruvallur (Area: 1,930 square kilometres (744 sq mi); Headquarters: Tiruvallur)

== Administration ==
The district was sub-divided into three sub-divisions each under the charge of a Deputy Collector:

- Chingleput sub-division: Chingleput, Madurantakam and Conjeevaram taluks
- Saidapet sub-division: Saidapet taluk
- Tiruvallur sub-division: Tiruvallur and Ponneri taluks.

As of 1901, the district had two municipalities Conjeevaram and Chingleput.

== Demographics ==
Historical population
| Year | Pop. | ±% |
|---|---|---|
| 1871 | 938,184 | — |
| 1881 | 981,381 | +4.6% |
| 1891 | 1,202,928 | +22.6% |
| 1901 | 1,312,122 | +9.1% |
Sources: Imperial Gazetteer of India, Volume 10. Clarendon Press. 1908.

As of 1901, Chingleput had a total population of 1,312,222. 96 percent of the population were Hindus while the rest where Christians and Muslims. About three-fourths of the people spoke Tamil as their mother tongue the remainder spoke Telugu. Due to its proximity to Madras city, there were also large numbers of Europeans in the district.

== See also ==
- Chingleput Ryots' Case
- Roman Catholic Diocese of Chingleput
