= Swetha Sudhakar =

Indian transgender activist

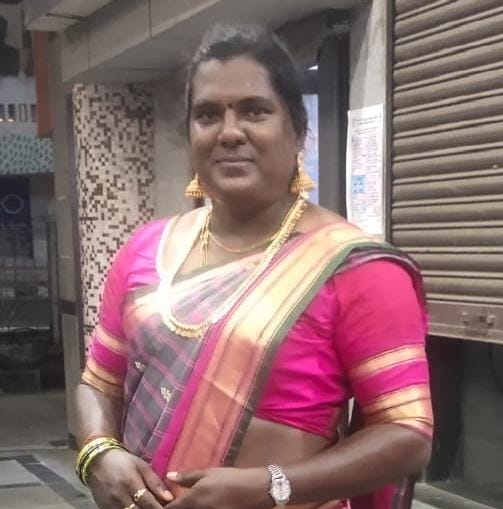
- Sudhakar in 2022
- Organization: Born2Win
- Website: http://borntwowin.org/

Swetha Sudhakar is an Indian transgender activist and founder of Born2Win Welfare Trust, a non-governmental organization providing assistance to trans people.

== Biography ==
Swetha Sudhakar has a bachelor's in public administration, a master's degree in sociology, and a diploma in counseling. Sudhakar founded Born2Win Welfare Trust in Chennai in 2013. The organization provides financial support to trans people for formal education and facilitates skill training for employment. In 2020 she co-founded a soap manufacturing brand; in 2025 she led the creation of Born2Win Trans Boutique, a trans-led boutique in Saidapet.
