= P. S. Subrahmanya Sastri =

Indian Sanskrit scholar (1890–1978)

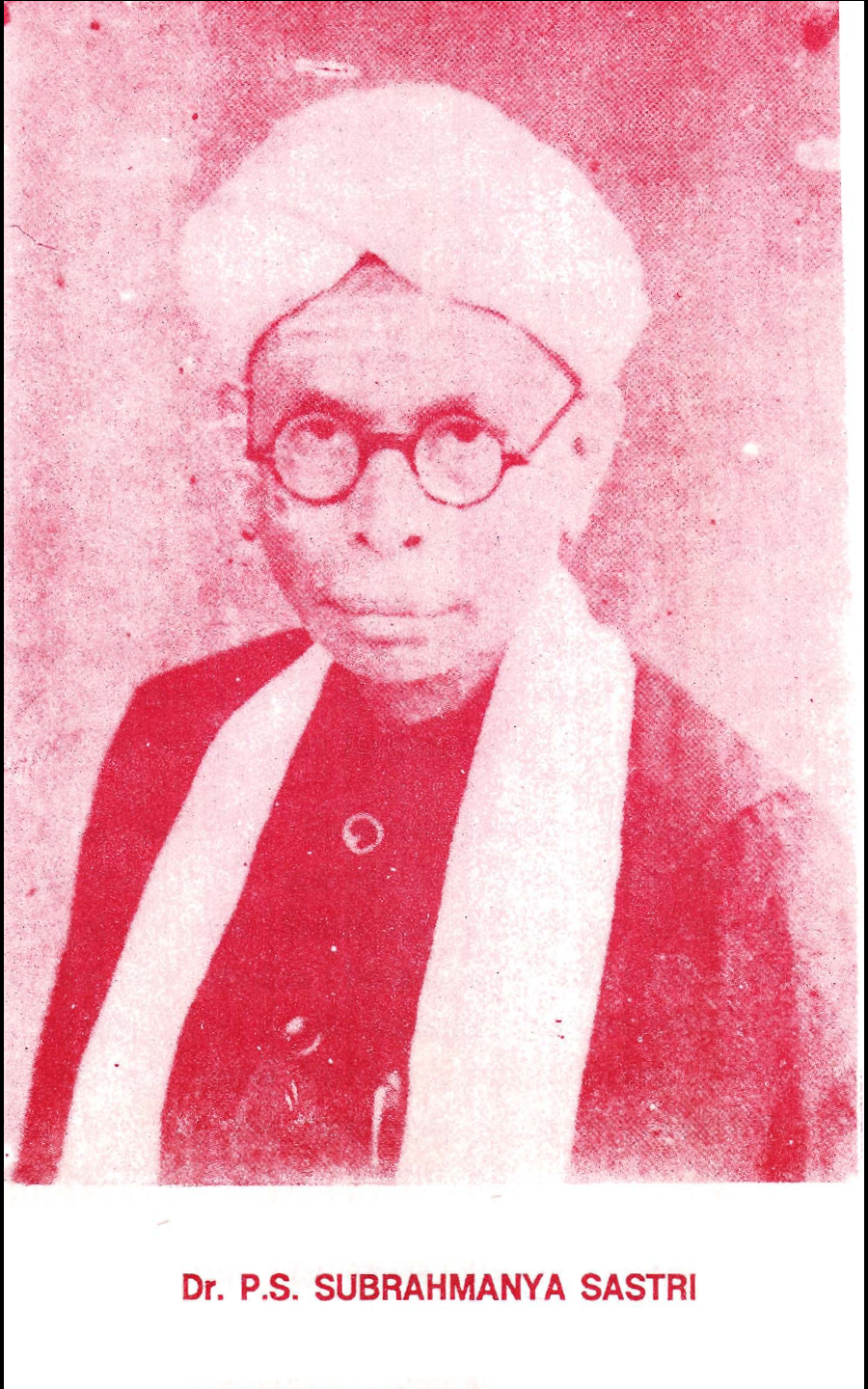
- Born: 29 July 1890; Tiruchirappalli, British India
- Died: May 20, 1978 (aged 87); Tiruvaiyaru, Tamil Nadu, India
- Education: PhD (Madras University)
- Occupation: Professor
- Known for: Tamil and Sanskrit scholar

P. S. Subrahmanya Sastri (29 July 1890 – 20 May 1978) was a Sanskrit scholar, who also acquired mastery over Tamil language and literature. He was the first to translate Tolkāppiyam into English.

== Education ==
Subrahmanya Sastri did his S.S.L.C. at National High School, F.A. at St. Joseph's College and B.A. Mathematics at SPG (later Bishop Heber's) College – all in Tiruchirappalli. He started his professional career as a Mathematics assistant at the Central High School (now Srinivasa Rao Higher Secondary School), Thiruvaiyaru, and National High School, Tiruchi.

He studied Sanskrit under Nilakanta Sastri, a specialist in grammar and philosophy. He also learnt Nyaya (logic) and Alankara Sastra (Poetics and Literary Criticism) from Prof. S. Kuppuswami Sastri of the Madras Presidency College (professor of Sanskrit and comparative philology, and curator of the Government Oriental Manuscripts Library, Madras) and Mimamsa (Linguistics) from Chinnaswami Sastri of the Benares Hindu University. A graduate in M.A. (Sanskrit), Subrahmanya Sastri also passed L.T. through Teachers’ Training College at Saidapet, Chennai.

While teaching Sanskrit, Subrahmanya Sastri had to teach Tamil also. This paved the way for his in-depth study in both Sanskrit and Tamil, specifically grammar. Prof. Kuppuswami Sastri also taught him the Comparative Philology of Indo Aryan languages. All these inspired Subrahmanya Sastri to take up a systematic study of Tamil literature and grammar.

== First Ph.D in Tamil ==
Subrahmanya Sastri submitted his Ph.D. thesis, ‘History of Grammatical Theories in Tamil and their relation to grammatical literature in Sanskrit’ in 1930 at the Madras University. His was the first Ph.D. degree in Tamil awarded by the University of Madras. This was subsequently published by the Kuppuswami Sastri Research Institute, Chennai

== Career ==
Subrahmanya Sastri was appointed Professor of Oriental Studies at SPG College, Tiruchi, by Fr. Gardiner in 1917 and served his alma mater till 1926. He then became the Asst. Editor, Tamil Lexicon, University of Madras, in which capacity he served till 1932 and editor of the Lexicon for a month. He was principal, Rajah's College, Thiruvaiyaru (1932-1942) and Head of the Department of Sanskrit at the Annamalai University (1942–1947).

During his tenure at Annamalai University Subrahmanya Sastri revived the defunct Sanskrit Honours course. His class lectures in Sanskrit or English used to be interspersed with parallels from Tamil literature. It is because of this, Mr. Thomas T. Burrow, a Sanskrit scholar from England (later Boden Professor of Sanskrit at the Oxford University and the joint author of the epoch making Dravidian Etymological Dictionary), took keen interest in attending his Sanskrit classes at Annamalai University.

== Research ==
Subrahmanya Sastri worked on the Tolkappiyam, which he later translated into English. The translation of ‘Ezhuthu’ and ‘Poruladhikaram’ were published by the Kuppuswami Sastri Research Institute, while the ‘Solladhikaram part’ was published by Annamalai University.

Subrahmanya Sastri's text on Tolkappiyam in Roman transliteration and English translation received encomiums from linguists across the world.

== Literary works ==
During his tenure at Annamalai University, Subrahmanya Sastri published two volumes of lectures on Patanjali's Mahabhashya, the Thonivilakku, a Tamil translation of Dhvanyaloka (a Sanskrit rhetorical text), History of Sanskrit literature and Sanskrit Language (2 books) in Tamil and Historical Tamil Reader in English.

On his retirement, he returned to Thiruvaiyaru and completed the translation of the Mahabhashya into English (in 14 volumes running to about 4,000 pages) on the advice of the Mahaperiyava of Kanchi. He finished his translation in 1953. The Kuppuswami Sastri Research Institute has published all the 14 Vols. of Prof. P.S.S.Sastri.

Under each sutra just before taking up the bhashya, Subrahmanya Sastri had pointed out the topics that would be dealt with in the great commentary. Then giving the original in the Devanagari script, he translated each passage of the text. With a view to elucidating the obscure points, he often added notes mostly based on Kaiyata's Pradipa and Nagesabhatta's Udyota. Footnotes are also given offering further explanation and showing variance in readings. The index of words is a welcome addition.

== Awards and felicitations ==
Subrahmanya Sastri was a recipient of several titles.

- Vidyaratna (Benares)
- Vidyanidhi (Kerala)
- Vidyabhushana (Karnataka)
- Mahamahimopadhyaya (Allahabad) and
- Vani-Triveni-Prayaga from the Periyava of Kanchi Mutt.

In the fifth title, the Mahaswami implied that Sanskrit and Tamil represented the rivers Ganga and Yamuna and English represented Antarvahini Saraswathi since his proficiency in English was hidden in his works.

== Personality ==
Subrahmanya Sastri read and wrote in various fields. In addition to Sanskrit, Tamil, and English, he studied German, French, Telugu, Kannada, and Malayalam. During his retirement at Tiruvaiyaru, he taught Tirukkural to a manual scavenger.

Subrahmanya Sastri was extremely kind to his students that sometimes he would pay their course and examination fee. He had studied the Rg, Yajur and Sama Vedas and taught them to many students. He had also published about 40 books besides his contribution of research articles in journals.

== Death ==
Subrahmanya Sastri died on 20 May 1978 at Tiruvaiyaru. An Endowment has been created in his name in 1997 at the Kuppuswami Sastri Research Institute and every year lecture is being arranged under this Endowment.

== See also ==
- List of translators into English
