= Trustpuram =

- Neighbourhood
- Trustpuram (Chennai) Trustpuram (Tamil Nadu) Trustpuram (India)
- Coordinates: 13°03′19.5″N 80°13′23.0″E
- Country: India
- State: Tamil Nadu
- District: Chennai
- Metro: Chennai

Government
  - Body: CMDA
- Elevation: 36 m (118 ft)

Languages
  - Official: Tamil
- Time zone: UTC+5:30 (IST)
- Postal code: 600024
- Planning agency: CMDA

Trustpuram is a residential area in Kodambakkam, in the city of Chennai, India.
