= Teachers' College, Saidapet =

Indian teacher training institute

Institute of Advanced Study in Education
- Other names: Teacher's College
- Type: Public
- Established: 1856
- Academic affiliations: TNTEU
- Principal: Dr.A.Subramani
- Undergraduates: B.Ed
- Postgraduates: M.Ed
- Location: Saidapet, Chennai, India; 13.0215°N 80.2272°E
- Website: iasetamilnadu.org

The Institute of Advanced Study in Education, popularly known as Teachers' College is the oldest teacher training institute in India located in Saidapet, Chennai.

== History ==
It was started in Vepery as the 'Government Normal School' in 1856. The college was shifted to its present campus in Saidapet in 1887 and it was recognized by the University of Madras as a teacher training institute in the same year. The Teacher's College was upgraded as the 'Institute of Advanced Study in Education' with the assistance from the central Government of India in 1990. The college was granted autonomous status by the UGC in 2005.

== Academic Programmes ==
The college offers undergraduate (B.Ed.), postgraduate (M.Ed.), and research programmes (M.Phil/Ph.D) in teacher's training and education under affiliation with the Tamil Nadu Teachers Education University.

== Notable alumni ==
The college has many notable educators and teachers since its inception in 1856. Some of its prominent alumni includes, former presidents and educators, Sarvepalli Radhakrishnan and Ramaswamy Venkataraman, famous orator, V. S. Srinivasa Sastri, Sanskrit scholar, P. S. Subrahmanya Sastri and the first Deputy Speaker of Lok Sabha, M. A. Ayyangar.
