= Prasanna Venkatesa Perumal Temple, Saidapet =

Hindu temple in Chennai

Coordinates: 13.030938°N 80.218896°E

Prasanna Venkatesa Perumal Temple

Religion
- Affiliation: Hinduism
- District: Chennai
- Deity: Venkateswara

Location
- Location: Saidapet
- State: Tamil Nadu
- Country: India
- Interactive map of Prasanna Venkatesa Perumal Temple

Architecture
- Completed: 12th century

Sri Prasanna Venkata Narasimha Perumal is a Hindu temple in Saidapet, Chennai, in the Indian state of Tamil Nadu. It is dedicated to Venkateswara, an incarnation of the Hindu deity Vishnu. It was constructed during the 12th century, but, according to historical records and inscriptions found within the temple, may consist of elements dating back more than 1000 years. The temple was constructed during the era when the South India was under the rule of the Vijayanagara Empire.

The temple is also known as "Prasanna Venkata Narshimar" due to the visit of Theliyasingher who is kovthugar of the temple.

The temple's regional legend states that Sri Prasanna Venkata Narasimha is incarnated with his divine consorts Sridevi and Bhudevi, facing east, in the Garbha Graha (sanctum sanctorum) of the temple.

== History ==
The temple is believed to have been constructed by the Balija Chetty community. When Vijayanagara monarchs like Krishnadeva Raya and Achyuta Raya who were devotees of Venkatesvara at Tirumala (Tirupati) ruled the region until the 16th century CE, many temples for Venkatesa Perumal were built in the Tamil region.

The Ramanuja Vijaya Vilasam hall near the temple was built in 1901, which is now known as Ramanuja Koodam.

== Features ==
The temple's 36-feet-tall wooden chariot is taken in procession during the annual festival. A Thanjavur painting of Rama Pattabhisekam is being worshipped in the temple.

=== Deities ===
Images of the following deities and saints are present in this temple:

- Anjaneya, located opposite to the Sri Ramar Sannidhi and called Bhakta Anjaneyar.
- Senai Mutalavar
- Nammalvar and Thirumangai Alvar, incarnated in a sannidhi adjacent to Sri Ramar.
- Ramanujar, Pillai Lokachariyar, and Manavala Mamunigal.
- Adishesha
- Sri Alarmelmangai Tayar Sannidhi, situated on southern side
- Sri Andal Sannidhi situated on the northern side of Perumal Sannidhi, facing east
- Pushkarani (holy tank) situated near the temple premises
- Unjal Mandapam, where Unjal seva of the temple is performed during Brahmohsavam

=== Vahanas ===
The vahanas refer to the mounts of deities.

Vahanas in the temple include: (Note: All these vahana’s are 300 years old.)

- Surya Prabhai / Chandra Prabhai
- Hamsam Vahanam (Note: For these particular vahanas, the eyes are made of Belgium stone to replicate the exorbitant glory and liveliness.)
- Karpagavriksham
- Garuda Vahanam
- Hanumantha Vahanam
- Sesha Vahanam
- Simma Vahanam
- Pallakku
- Yali Vahanam
- Gaja Vahanam
- Thirutther
- Mangala Giri
- Kudhirai Vahanam
- Punniya Kodi Vimanam

=== Utsavams (festivals) ===
- Masi Magam - celebrated in Masi
- Thotta Utsavam: Masi
- Panguni Uththiram: Panguni
- Sri Rama Navami: Panguni
- Brahmotsavam: Cittirai
- Vasanthotsvam: Vaikāci
- Thiruadippooram: Aadi
- Pavithrothsavam: Aippasi
- Pagal Pathu and Era Pathu: Mārkaḻi
- Alvar and Acharyars Thirunakshatrams

=== Other observances ===
On all Fridays, the statue of Sri Alarmelmangai Tayar is taken for a procession inside the temple premises.

Also Sri Prasanna Venkata Narasimha Perumal and the Alvars and acharyas are taken in a procession inside the temple on the Thirunakshatrams which are special and specific to them.

Once a year, Sri Paarthasaarathy Perumal from Triplicane visits this temple in the month of February, during the Thotta Utsavam festival.

Also Mylapore Sri Aadhi Kesava Perumal visits this temple. During this visit a special Thirumanjam is performed for him.

== See also ==
- Heritage structures in Chennai
