= Hafiz Ahmad Khan Mosque =

Mosque in Chennai, Tamil Nadu, India

- அபீசு அகமது கான் மசூதி
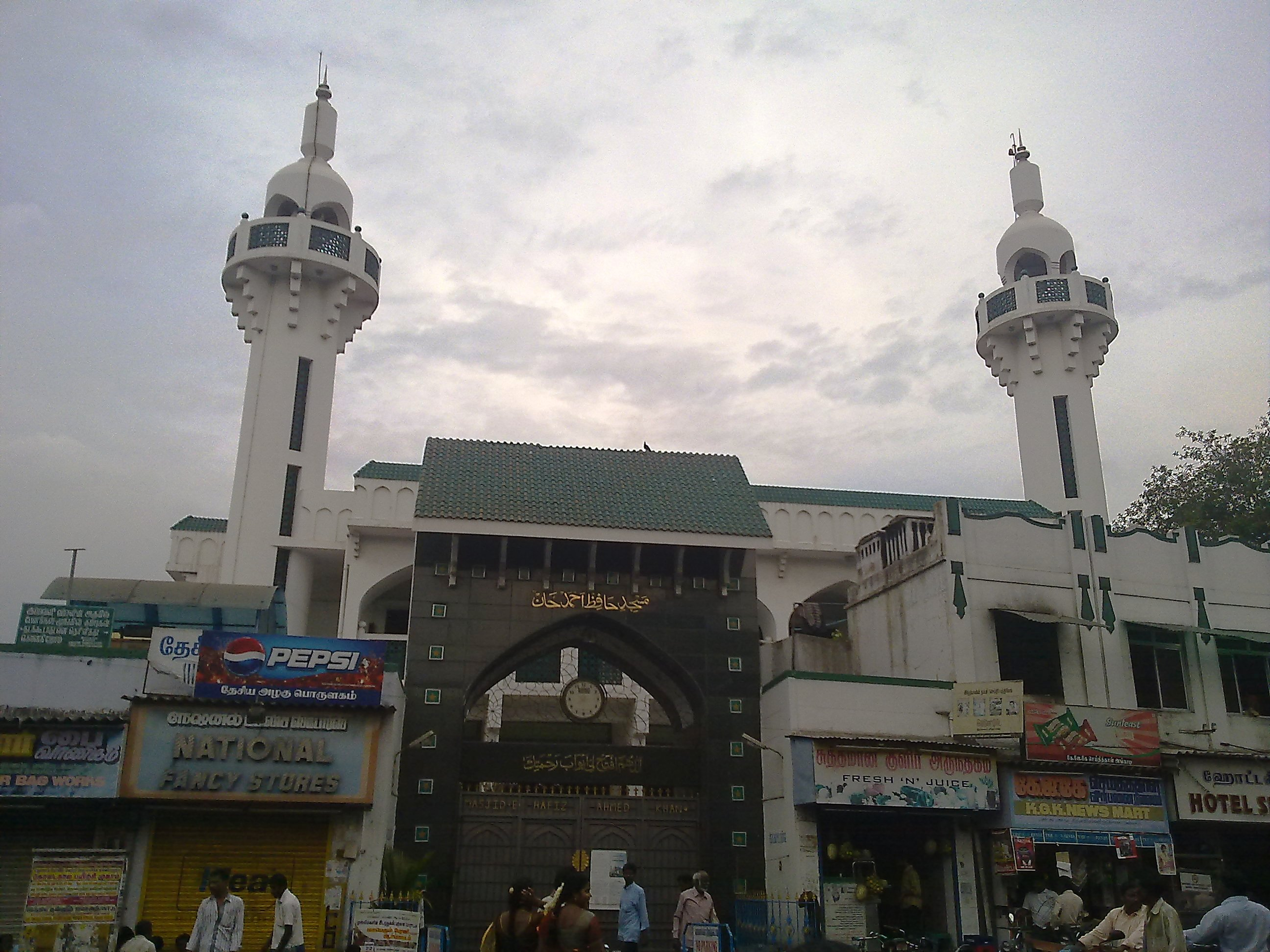
- The mosque, including advertising, in 2012

- Location of the mosque in Chennai

Religion
- Affiliation: Islam
- Ecclesiastical or organizational status: Mosque
- Status: Active

Location
- Location: Chepauk, Chennai, Tamil Nadu
- Country: India
- Interactive map of Hafiz Ahmad Khan Mosque
- Coordinates: 13°03′11″N 80°16′25″E

Architecture
- Type: Mosque architecture
- Founder: Hafiz Ahmad Khan
- Established: 1818
- Minaret: Two

The Hafiz Ahmad Khan Mosque (Tamil: அபீசு அகமது கான் மசூதி), also known as the Masjid-A-Hafiz Ahmed Khan or the Ice House Mosque, is a mosque located in the Chepauk neighbourhood of Chennai, in the state of Tamil Nadu, India. The mosque is situated next to Vivekanandar Illam on Quai-de-Millath Road, in an area also known as Ice House. and was constructed in 1818 by Hafiz Ahmad Khan, an official in Carnatic court.

Hafiz Ahmad Khan and his elder brother, Bahram Jung, who constructed the Bahram Jung Mosque, incurred huge expenses on part of the Carnatic state that on the death of Wallajah's successor, Umdat ul-Umara, the lands belonging to the brothers were confiscated by the East India Company.

== See also ==
- Islam in India
- List of mosques in India
