= Karunguzhi =

- Town
- Location in Tamil Nadu, India
- Coordinates: 12.55°N 79.9°E
- Country: India
- State: Tamil Nadu
- District: Chengalpattu

Population (2001)
  - Total: 11,265

Languages
  - Official: Tamil
- Time zone: UTC+5:30 (IST)

Karunguzhi is a town in Chengalpattu district in the Indian state of Tamil Nadu.

== History ==
the town of Karunguzhi, with an interruption between 1825 and 1835, was the first capital and administrative headquarters were transferred to Kanchipuram. In 1859 the capital Saidapet, now a neighbourhood in the city of Chennai, was made the administrative headquarters of the district.

It acted as the capital of Chingleput District under Madras presidency from 1793-1825 and from 1835-1859.

== Demographics ==
As of 2001 India census, Karunguzhi had a population of 11,265. Males constitute 50% of the population and females 50%. Karunguzhi has an average literacy rate of 68%, higher than the national average of 59.5%: male literacy is 75%, and female literacy is 61%. In Karunguzhi, 12% of the population is under 6 years of age.

There are several tourist attractions in the area. "Vedanthangal Bird Sanctuary" is one of the most famous bird sanctuaries in India. It is 8 km from Karunguzhi.

An ancient fort built by a Pallava emperor is also located here. There are two mountains in Karunguzhi. One is a Renganathar mountain, in Malaipalayam: It is nearly 700 metres high and a temple to Lord Vishnu is on the top. The other mountain is in Karunguzhi forest. In the middle of the forest is a temple to Siva.

Nearby is the Lord Gnanagereeswarar temple, built nearly 1000 years ago. A lake is also there, covering nearly 500 acres (2.0 km^{2}).

Madurantakam town is 3 km from Karunguzhi. The second biggest lake in Tamil Nadu is Madurantakam lake.
