= Saidapet =

- Neighbourhood
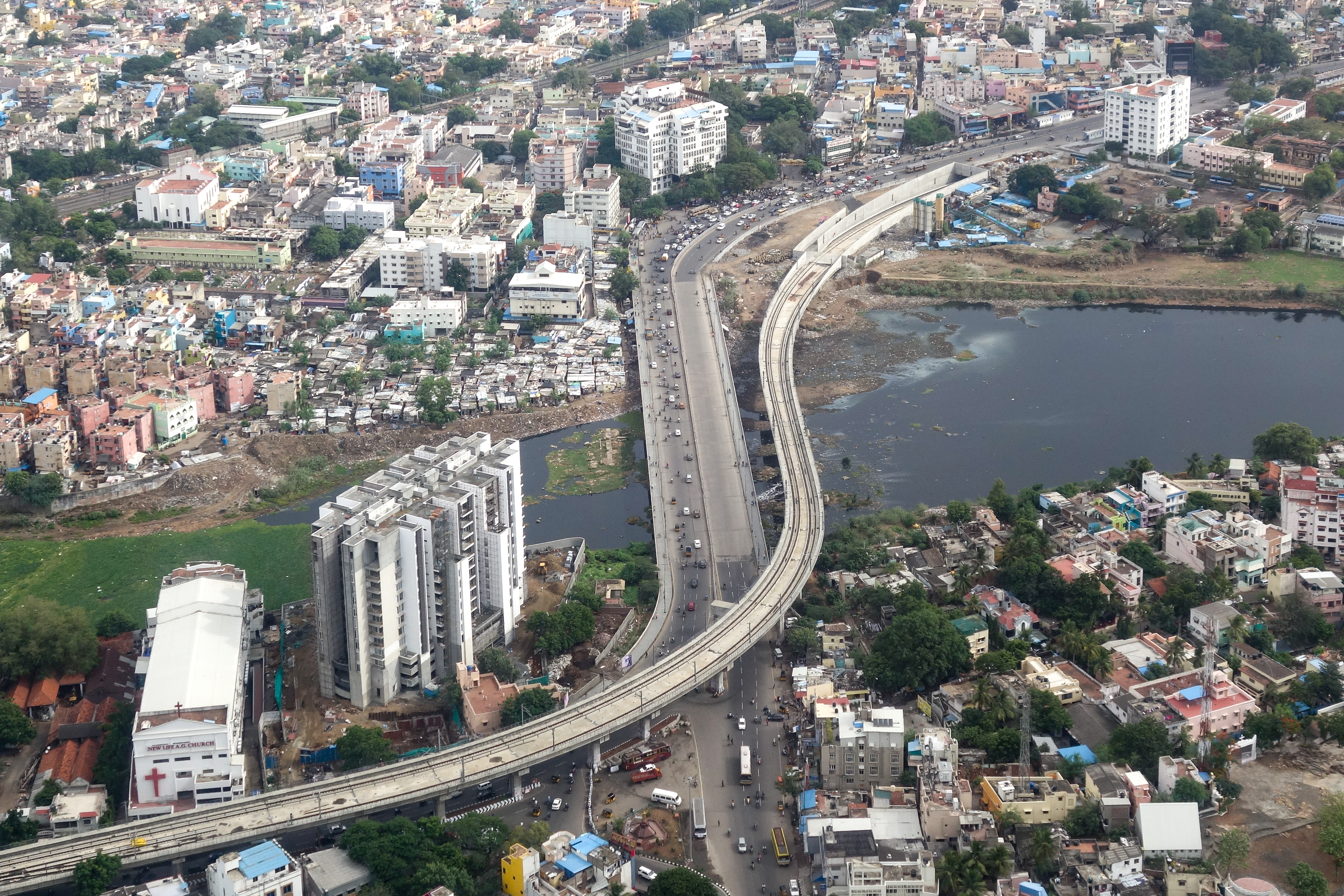
- Aerial view of Saidapet as in July 2018

- Saidapet (Chennai) Saidapet (Tamil Nadu) Saidapet (India)
- Coordinates: 13°01′17″N 80°13′17″E
- Country: India
- State: Tamil Nadu
- District: Chennai District
- Metro: Chennai

Government
  - Body: Chennai Corporation

Area
  - Total: 2.87 km^{2} (1.11 sq mi)
- Elevation: 34 m (112 ft)

Languages
  - Official: Tamil
- Time zone: UTC+5:30 (IST)
- Postal code: 600015
- Vehicle registration: TN-09
- Planning agency: CMDA
- Civic agency: Chennai Corporation
- Website: www.chennai.tn.nic.in

Saidapet is a neighbourhood of Chennai, India situated about 12.20 kilometres (7.58 miles) from kilometre zero of Chennai city. Historically, an important suburban town of Madras city, Saidapet served as the southern gateway to the city for long by virtue of its strategic location on the Mount Road stretch of the Grand Southern Trunk Road until its inclusion in the limits of the then Corporation of Madras city in 1946. Saidapet functioned as the administrative headquarters of Chingleput District and the residence of its District Collector from 1859 to 1968. The Saidapet Court is located in Saidapet and also the taluk offices from 1798 onwards until 1997, though Saidapet town, itself, had been transferred from Chingleput District to Madras district in 1946.

Saidapet is named after Sayyid Khan, a cavalry officer in service of the Nawab of Carnatic who owned lands here in the second half of the 18th century though there had been settlements in the area long prior to Sayyid Khan's time. Christian pilgrims from Fort St. George to the shrine at St. Thomas Mount had to pass through Saidapet and the Marmalong Bridge was constructed for their convenience across the Adyar River at Saidapet by the Armenian merchant Coja Petrus Uscan in 1726. In 1780, the British East India Company acquired possession of Saidapet along the rest of the jaghire of Chingleput and made it an important administrative centre. Saidapet was the location of the Government Model Farm where experiments were carried out in the late 19th century for growing genetically modified varieties of wheat. Saidapet was also the location of the Government Agricultural College from 1868 to 1906 when it was moved to Coimbatore. The Government Teachers Training College has been functioning from Saidapet since 1864 and the main campus of the Tamil Nadu Open University was set up in 2002.

The municipality of Saidapet was established in 1921 and rapidly grew into a satellite town of Madras city absorbing suburban areas situated on the fringes of Madras. For administrative convenience, the municipality was dissolved in 1946 and its areas incorporated into Madras city where as of 2018, the greater part of Saidapet comes under Ward 169 of the Greater Chennai Corporation with smaller portions in Ward 168 and Ward 170.

The market in West Saidapet is an important shopping and business hub. Traditionally, Saidapet has been an important weaving and hand dyeing centre which was centred on the shores of the Adyar River. Saidapet has important places of worship for all major religions - the Karaneeswarar Temple for Hindus, the Saidapet Jama Masjid for Muslims, while the Little Mount shrine, where the apostle St. Thomas is believed to have lived and preached, an important place of pilgrimage for St. Thomas Christians. Saidapet has a bus depot and is served by the Saidapet railway station of the Chennai Suburban Railway and the Saidapet and Little Mount metro stations.

Historical population
Year	Pop.	±%
1881	15,345	—
1891	17,821	+16.1%
1901	21,507	+20.7%
1911	22,043	+2.5%
1921	27,404	+24.3%
1931	33,037	+20.6%
1941	41,347	+25.2%
Sources: Census of India, 1881-1941

== Location ==
Saidapet is situated in the southwest part of Chennai city almost exactly halfway between Broadway (14 kilometres (8.7 miles)) and Tambaram (12 kilometres (7.5 miles)). It is flanked by Nandanam in the north, Raja Annamalaipuram in the east and Guindy in the south and Guindy and Kotturpuram in the south-east. Mambalam and T. Nagar bound Saidapet in the north and north-west and Ekkaduthangal in the south-west. Saidapet is situated about 5 kilometres (3.1 miles) west of the Adyar estuary's confluence with the Bay of Bengal.

== Geography and climate ==
Much of Saidapet is low lying and covered with sandy loam which is generally not suited for agriculture. However, the soil was found to be rich in potash which makes it ideal for tobacco cultivation. It also had high quantities of nitrogen which converts into nitric acid when the first fresh rains fall. Little Mount, an average-sized hillock is situated on the southern banks of the Adyar river.

Saidapet is situated at an average elevation of 34 metres (112 feet) above sea level. The Adyar river bed at Saidapet is heavily encroached upon and the people who lived along the river bed who were exclusively from low income groups suffered heavily during the 2015 South India floods when their habitations were washed away and the water levels in the Adyar river reached upto the Maraimalai Adigal bridge. As of 2017, two years later, many of the flood victims were still homeless. The southern part of Saidapet might have been covered in scrub forest of which patches survive in the Raj Bhavan grounds and Guindy National Park.

Under the Köppen climate classification, like the rest of Chennai city, Saidapet has the dry-summer version of a tropical savanna climate (As), It gets monsoonal rains between September and December every year. Like most South Indian rivers, the Adyar river is seasonal and is dry for over six months of the year.

The Adyar river at Saidapet is heavily polluted from industrial effluents and laundry activity on its banks that it highly unsuitable for fishes, birds and marine life. Saidapet lies in Seismic Zone 3 which is chacterized by moderate risk of earthquakes.

== History ==
=== Early History ===
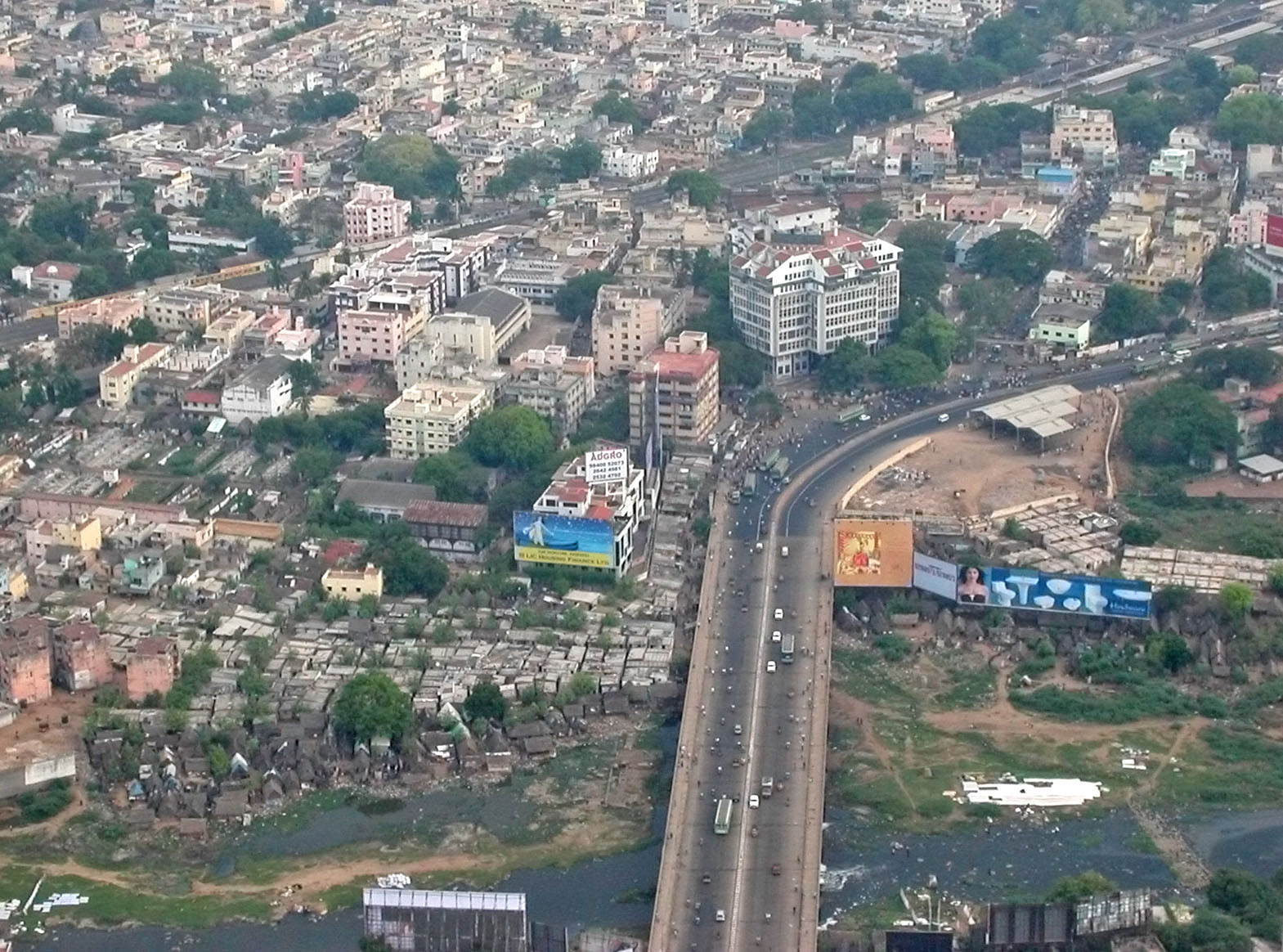
Aerial view of Saidapet as in 2005

An unidentified worn out Roman coin along with several contemporaneous Indian coins were reportedly discovered from an unnamed Hindu temple in Saidapet in 1883 proving that there were human settlements in the region over two thousand years ago. Nearby Mambalam had also yielded a denarius of the Roman emperor Augustus during an archaeological investigation in 1929.

The older of the two chapels at Little Mount was constructed by the Portuguese in 1551. It has a Portuguese inscription dated 1612 and stands over a cave where the apostle St. Thomas had allegedly lived and meditated. The cave has a small window below which are handprints alleged to be of the apostle.

Following the founding of the British settlement at Fort St George in 1639, a road was constructed for European pilgrims to St. Thomas Mount and they frequented Saidapet as it lay on the route. A wealthy Armenian benefactor named Coja Petrus Uscan constructed the Marmalong Bridge across the Adyar River at Saidapet in 1726 and set up a trilingual marble plaque in Latin, Persian and Armenian recording the event. While Marmalong bridge was demolished in the 1960s and replaced with a modern motorable bridge, the plaque has survived intact in its original location close to the Saidapet bus stand.

In the 18th century, Saidapet became a part of the Carnatic kingdom and was given as a fief towards the end of that century by the Nawab of Carnatic to a faujdar named Sayyid Khan from whom the neighbourhood probably takes its name. Until then, Saidapet was presumably a part of Mambalam and didn't have a name of its own and its generally accepted that "Marmalong", the name of the bridge across the Adyar river was a corruption of the word "Mambalam". In keeping with custom, the shortened Tamil form "Saidai" is also frequently used often as a demonym.

=== Under the British ===
In 1763, the revenue administration of Saidapet was taken over the British East India Company from the Nawab of the Carnatic along with the rest of the "jaghire" of Chingleput. However, the "jaghire" remained under the Nawab's political rule till 1780. Following British annexation, Saidapet was made a part of Chingleput district in 1794 and the borders of Madras city were extended upto Teynampet in 1871 and later, Nandanam. Saidapet, while not within the administrative limits of Madras city, was still practically a suburb of Madras.

At a short distance before Marmalong Bridge is situated Lushington Gardens, a prominent garden house constructed in the 1830s. Prior to the construction of this garden house, starting from the 1780s, the Scottish botanist John Anderson experimented with setting up a "nopalry" for breeding a particular variety of cochineal at this very spot. A few decades into this experiment, the "nopalry" was shifted to the Lal Bagh gardens in Bangalore. In the northern corner of Saidapet lies the Fourbeck Monument, a pillar dedicated to Adrian Fourbeck, a merchant who donated for the construction of a bridge across the Mambalam canal in 1786.

The administrative headquarters of Chingleput district were shifted to Saidapet in 1859 and a District Collector's office and various other offices constructed for the purpose.The Collector's Office, an Indo-Saracenic building known as Homes' Gardens (later renamed as Panagal Maaligai) with a magistrate's court presided over by the District Collector was demolished in 1990 and replaced with a modern building.

The Teacher's Training College was started in Vepery as the Government Normal School in 1856 by Sir Alexander Arbuthnot and shifted to Saidapet in 1864. The Government Agricultural College was started in Saidapet in 1868 and functioned from there from 1868 to 1906.

The Government Model Farm was inaugurated at Saidapet in 1865 by Sir William Denison, Governor of Madras from 1861 and 1866 and wheat and tobacco were cultivated along Mount Road on experimental basis. After a few years, the services of a professional agriculturist, W. R. Robertson were requisitioned. Subsequently, Robertson also headed the Government Agricultural College as principal. The farm endured with little success for about two decades after which operations were considerably scaled down and eventually abandoned.

The Saidapet railway station was constructed in the 1870s. When the Chennai suburban railway electric train service from Madras Beach to Tambaram commenced operations in 1931, the tracks were electrified and motor bus services were introduced at about the same time.

The municipality of Saidapet was inaugurated on 1 April 1921 comprising Saidapet town and Mambalam, Kodambakkam, Puliyur, Saligrammam and Choolaimedu suburban villages of Madras city. The total number of wards was 14 which was soon increased to 20. A government notification published in January 1922 excluded Guindy Race Course from the jurisdiction of the Saidapet municipality. The municipality built roads and parks, collected tolls and electrified streets. However, its unusual size and topography (the municipality stretched from Guindy for 8 mi^{2} (21 km^{2}) in a north-westerly direction upto Choolaimedu and its shape was described as forming "an arc around Madras city") and lack of proper road connectivity between the far-flung areas creative administrative hassles. The outlying areas such as Mambalam, Saligramman and Choolaimedu suffered from poor sanitation and lack of electricity and basic civic amenities. As a remedial measure, the Saidapet municipality was dissolved in 1946, a year before India's independence and all its constituents absorbed into the Corporation of Madras.

=== Post independence ===
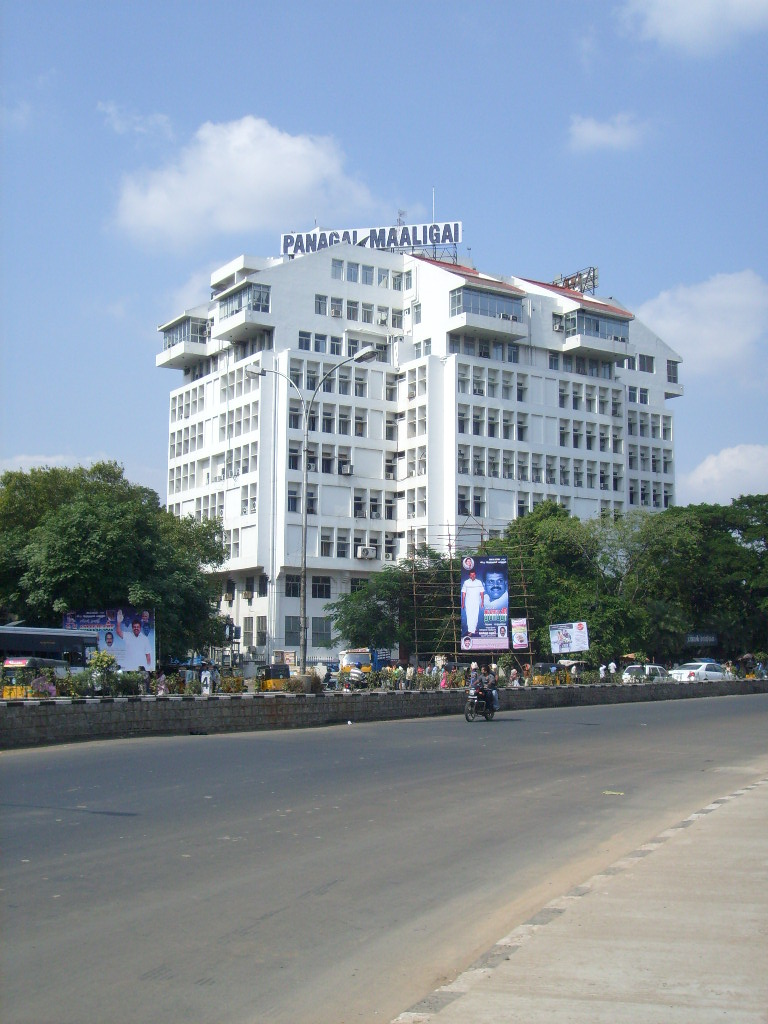
Panagal Maaligai or Panagal Building, built in 1991 upon the site of the older Homes' Gardens where the offices of the Chingleput District Collectorate were based

Saidapet witnessed steady growth through the 1950s and grew in political importance as a stronghold of the Dravidian Movement. Dravida Munnetra Kazhagam leader M. Karunanidhi who served as Chief Minister of Tamil Nadu for over 20 years was elected from the Saidapet Assembly constituency in the 1967 and 1971 elections. The people of Saidapet also played a significant role in the Anti-Hindi agitations of 1938 and 1967. The 200-year old Marmalong Bridge across the Adyar river was deemed unsuitable for heavy motor vehicle traffic and was demolished and the Maraimalai Adigal Bridge constructed in its place in 1966. A bus depot was constructed along Anna Salai in Saidapet to cater to the needs of an expanding bus network.

The northern part of Saidapet formed the site of a planned residential township scheme initiated by C. Rajagopalachari, the then Chief Minister of Madras state who christened the township "Nandanam" after the name of the prevailing Tamil year (1952-53). Saidapet remained the administrative headquarters of Chingleput District till 1968 despite not being a part of the district itself and a taluk headquarters till 1997.

Saidapet became part of blue line of the Chennai Metro Rail network and commenced operations in May 2018. Saidapet is served by two metro stations - the Saidapet metro station caters to the areas surrounding Saidapet Bus Stand and West Saidapet while the Little Mount metro station caters to the needs of Little Mount, Saidapet Court and parts of Guindy.

== Politics, administration and civic amenities ==
Greater Chennai Corporation (GCC) Representatives
Councillor for Ward No 168	D. Mohan Kumar (DMK)
Councillor for Ward No 169	M. Mahesh Kumar (DMK)
Councillor for Ward No 170	K. R. Sundaramurugan (AIADMK)
Member of the Tamil Nadu Legislative Assembly
Arul Prakasam M. (TVK)
Member of the Lok Sabha
Thamizhachi Thangapandian (DMK)

Saidapet makes up the entirety of ward 169 and portions of ward 168 and 170 of zone 13 (Adyar) of the Greater Chennai Corporation. A major portion of Saidapet proper including the Saidapet Bus Stand, the Saidapet Court and taluk offices come under Ward 169 while Ward 168 comprises West Saidapet and portions of Ekkaduthangal and Ward 170 includes the eastern portions of Saidapet along with parts of Kotturpuram.

Saidapet forms part of the Saidapet Assembly constituency of the Tamil Nadu Legislative Assembly and Chennai South Lok Sabha constituency of the Parliament of India. The incumbent member of the Tamil Nadu legislature is Arul Prakasam M. of the Tamilaga Vettri Kazhagam while the incumbent member of the Lok Sabha is Thamizhachi Thangapandian of the Dravida Munnetra Kazhagam.

Water supply is provided by the Chennai Metropolitan Water Supply and Sewerage Board while electricity is provided by the Tamil Nadu Power Distribution Corporation Limited. Law and order enforcement is handled by the Greater Chennai Police. Saidapet forms the charge of an Assistant Commissioner of Police and has three police stations within its limits including an All Women Police station - R6 Kumaran Nagar, W20 Saidapet All Women Police Station and J1. Saidapet.

== Culture and economy ==
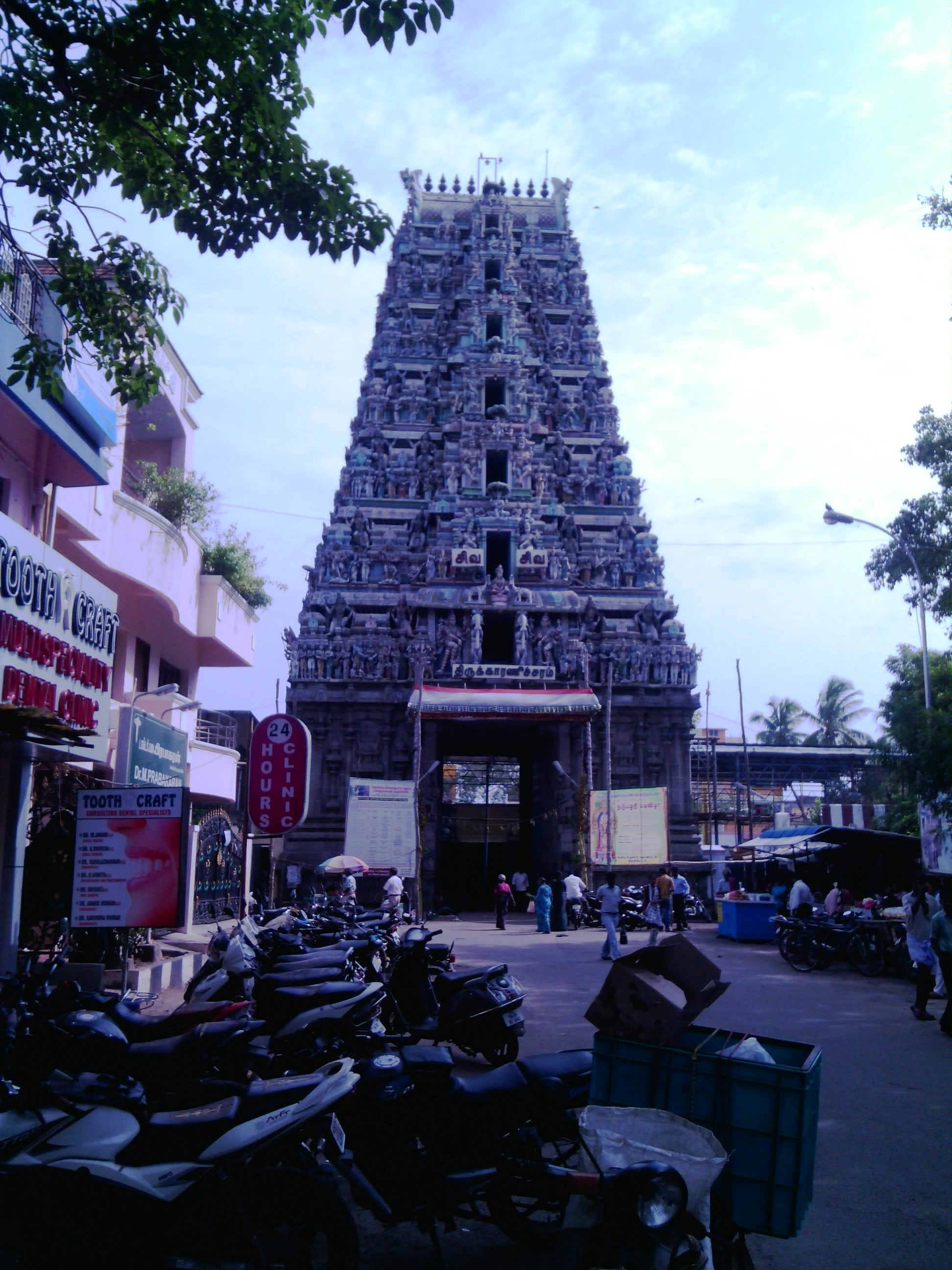
Kaaraneeswarar Temple, Saidapet

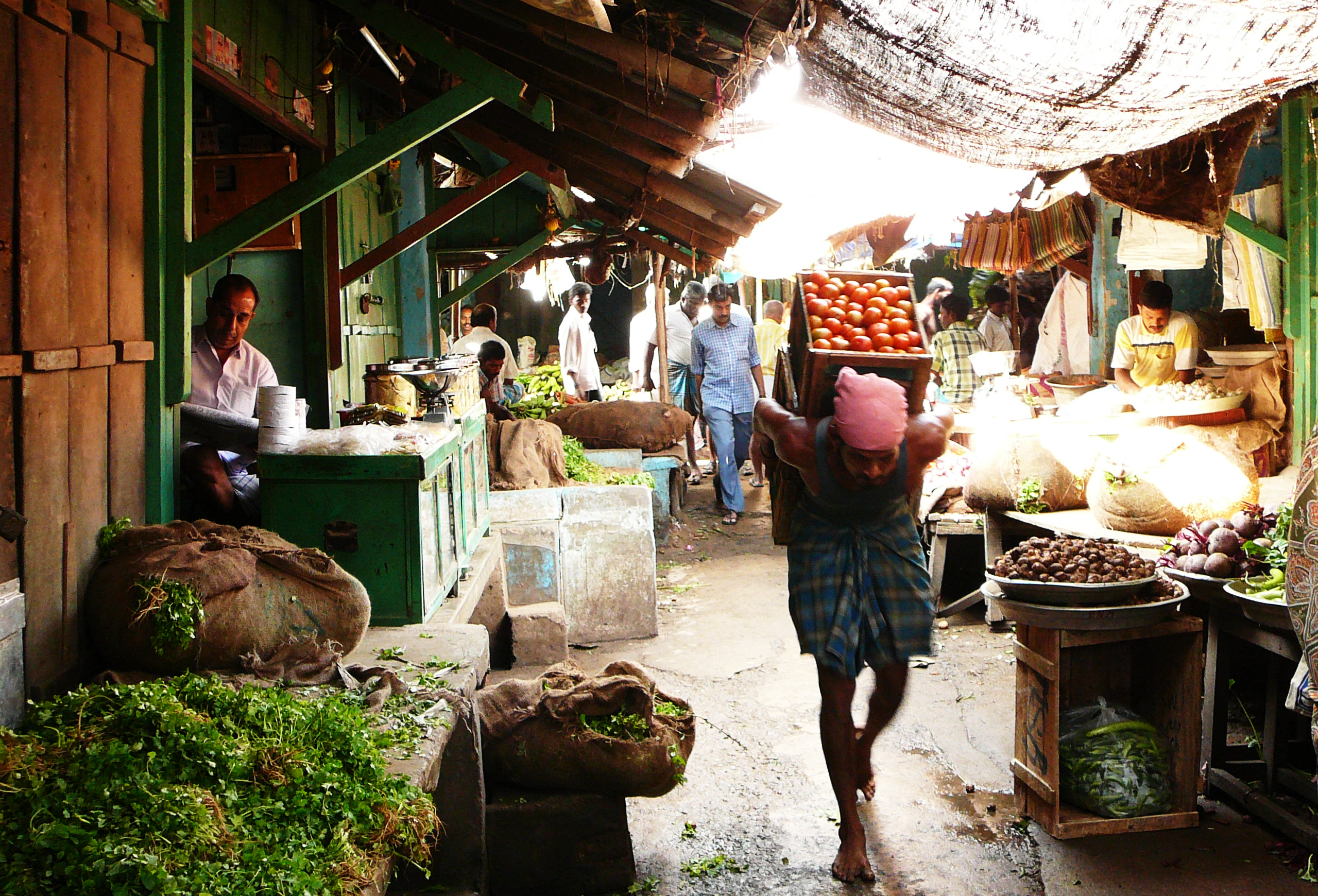
Saidapet market

The economy of Saidapet has been largely shaped by its shopping district - the bazaar and the town's preeminence in the weaving business.The banks of the Adyar river at Saidapet have been used for centuries by traditional washermen who utilize the waters of the river to do their laundry. The bazaar also a significant number of restaurants selling signature Saidapet dishes, the most popular among them being the Saidapet vadacurry. A 1940 thesis lists weaving and dyeing, making and repairing of jhutkas and dhobying as Saidapet's chief industries.According to the 1961 Census handbook for Madras district, Saidapet's chief industries were cane products, bamboo basket making, printed textiles and palm leaf products.

Saidapet has places of worship of all major religions. The Karaneeswarar Temple in West Saidapet is about 200-300 years old. The temple is dedicated to the Hindu god Shiva as Karaneeswara and his consort Swarnambikai (Parvathi). Religious sermons on the Tiruvacakam are given at the Karaneeswarar Temple during the Chithirai festival. The Prasanna Venkatesa Perumal Temple is much older and believed to date from the 12th century CE. The Anjaneyar Temple on the banks of the Adyar river, the Senguntha Kottam Sri Sivasubrahmanyaswamy Temple and the Soundareswarar temple administered by the Hindu Religious and Charitable Endowments Department (HR&CE) of the Government of Tamil Nadu are other important Hindu temples in Saidapet.The Saidapet Jama Masjid is the most important mosque catering to the Muslim community of Saidapet. The 18th century Bahram Jung Mosque built with the patronage of the Nawab of the Carnatic at the northern end of Saidapet is also an important place of worship for the city's Sunni Muslim community. Saidapet has places of worship for varied Christian denominations such as the LDS Church at Little Mount which caters to the needs of the members of the Church of Latter Day Saints sect. The Church of South India's Church of Jesus the Saviour was constructed in 1902. The St. Thomas Church is another CSI church that was founded 85 years ago.

However, by far, the most frequented Christian shrine in Saidapet is the hill of Little Mount where the apostle St. Thomas is believed to have lived in hiding. There are two churches on the hill, the older one - the Church of our Lady of Good Health constructed by the Portuguese in 1551. The annual festival connected with the Little Mount shrine is one of the biggest Christian congregations in Chennai city.

A majority of Saidapet is made of working class neighbourhoods though its character has been changing of late with the advent of gated residential communities. Exceptions to this rule are Srinagar Colony on Taluk Office Road and Todhunter Nagar in the north named after Charles Todhunter, a former ICS officer and Governor of Madras and which originated as a housing scheme for government employees. But such anomalies aside, Saidapet's low income residents and the cockney dialect used by them, Madras Bashai, in common with other working class residents of Madras city have often been parodied in movies and film songs, notable in the song Vaa Vaadhiyare Ootanda in the 1968 Tamil film Bommalattam. Saidapet was also popularized by the rap song Petta Rap in the 1994 multingual Kaadhalan where Saidapet forms one of the numerous pettais listed by name.

== Transport and Communication ==
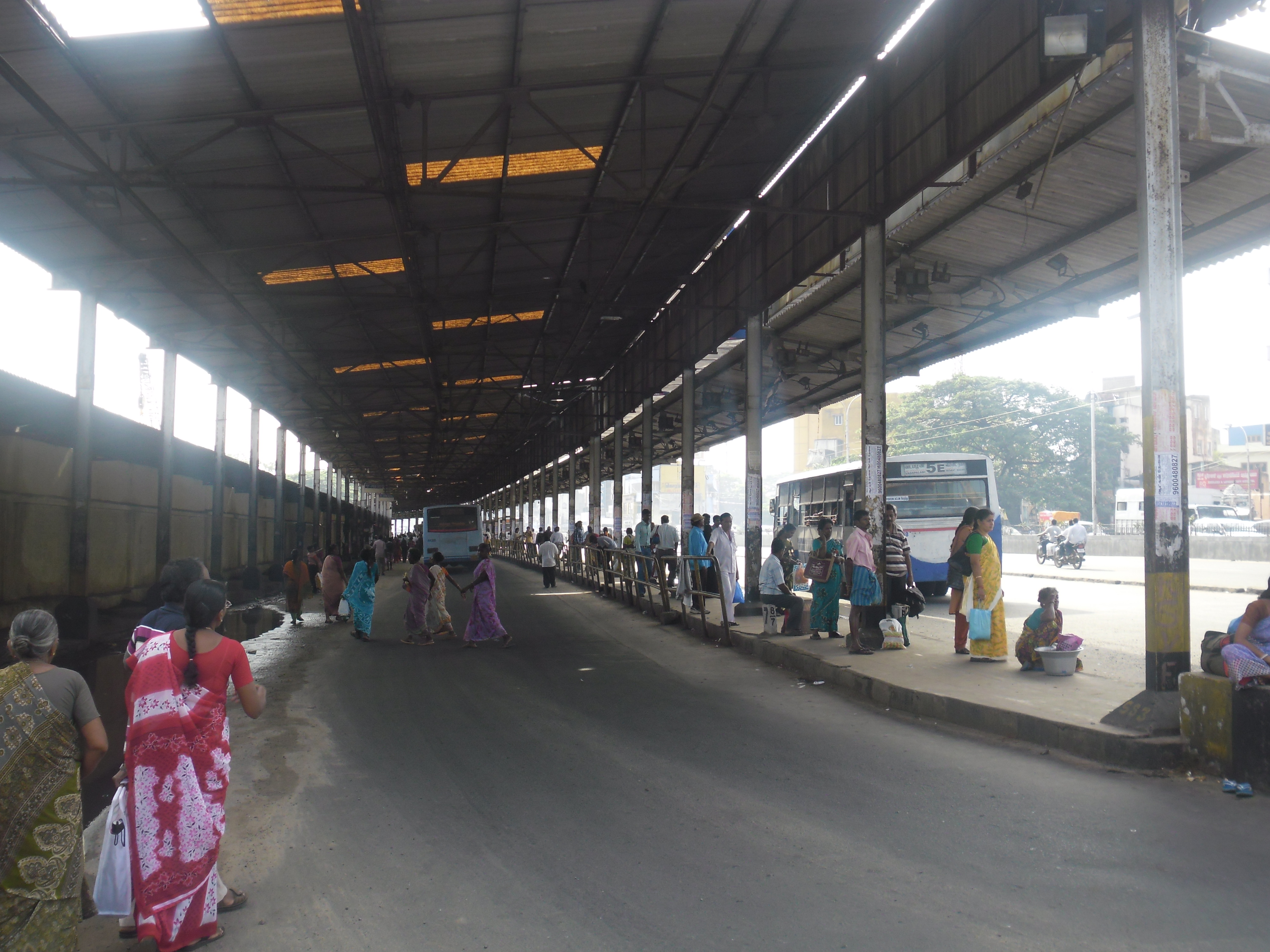
Saidapet Bus Stand along Anna Salai

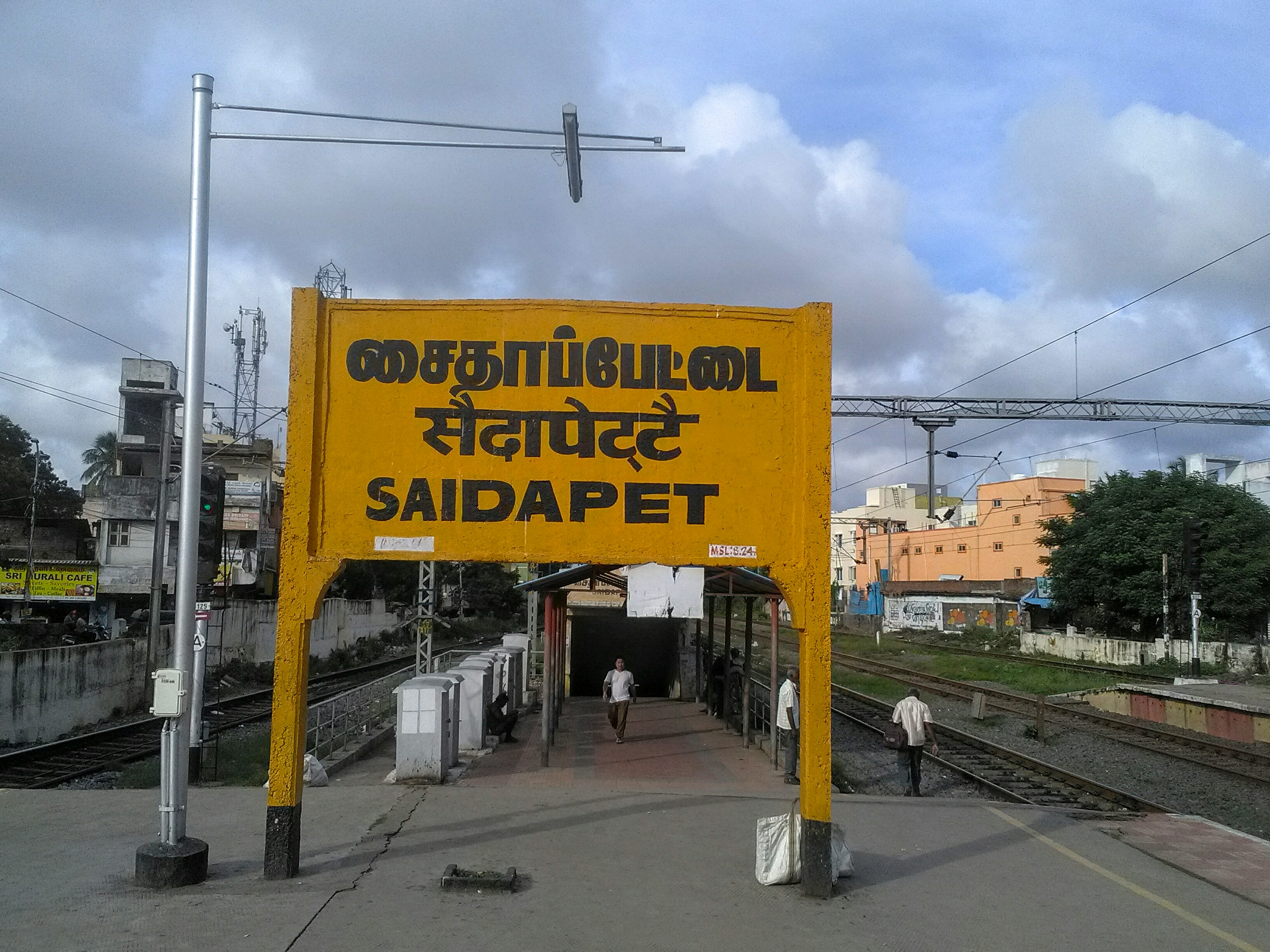
Saidapet Railway Station

Saidapet is well connected by road and rail to the rest of Chennai city. The Saidapet Bus Stand is situated on Anna Salai and forms the terminus for buses to Tambaram, Poonamallee, Kundrathur, Mangadu and Pammal apart from being an important stop for buses that serve on routes that run along Anna Salai. The Saidapet railway station is situated on Karaneeswarar Temple Street, West Saidapet. Saidapet is served by the Blue Line of the Chennai metro that plies between Wimco Nagar and Chennai Airport. There are two metro stations in Saidapet - the Saidapet metro station in the north and Little Mount metro station in the south separated by a distance of about 1.20 kilometres (0.75 miles). The Saidapet metro station caters to the residents of Todhunter Nagar, West Saidapet and the northern neighbourhoods while the Little Mount metro station to people living in Little Mount, Saidapet Court and Taluk Office Road. The service along the Airport to Little Mount stretch of the Chennai metro was inaugurated in September 2016 followed by the Little Mount to AG-DMS metro station stretch in May 2018.

Saidapet is served by two sub post offices of India Posts, one on Jeenis Road, West Saidapet and the other on Taluk Office Road. While the sub post office on Jeenis Road falls under the Theagarayanagar sub division, the Guindy North sub post office on Taluk Office Road falls under St. Thomas Mount sub division of Chennai South division of Chennai Region, Tamil Nadu Circle. Saidapet also has adequate landline telephone and mobile penetration.
