= Little Mount Shrine =

Church in Tamil Nadu, India

- Little Mount Shrine
- 13.0166448°N 80.2269111°E
- Location: Chinnamalai, Tamil Nadu
- Country: India
- Denomination: Catholic
- Website: littlemountshrine.com

The Little Mount Shrine is a church located on a hillock in Chinnamalai, Tamil Nadu. It is dedicated to St. Thomas and to Our Lady of Health. There is a cave on Little Mount where, according to tradition, St. Thomas lived for some time as a refuge from persecution. Two churches stand on the hill today. One is the old Portuguese-built church dedicated to Our Lady of Good Health, which was built in 1551. The cave is accessible through this church. The other is a newer church built in 1971 or 1972, replacing the older parish church.

== Other organizations of the church ==
=== Our Lady of Health School ===
This school was started with the purpose of providing education in English medium for the poor residents of the Little Mount parish. This school has only primary section and after fifth class students usually move on to other schools for continuing their education.

=== Immaculate Conception convent ===
The Immaculate Conception (IC) convent is located behind the church and near the entrance to Holy Land.

=== Missionaries of Charity (Brothers) - Karunai Illam ===
Karunai Illam provides a home for the destitute people who are differently disabled, both mentally and physically. It is run by brothers of Missionaries of Charity. Missionaries of Charity, Brothers was founded in 1963 by Mother Teresa to do work similar to the Sisters of Missionaries of Charity.

=== Ozanam Health Center ===
This health center was started at the initiative of Society of St. Vincent de Paul of Our Lady of Health Church. It was started at a time when common diseases were spreading among the poor people and doctors were difficult to find. It seeks to provide consultation and treatment to poor people for free or at nominal cost.

=== St. Thomas Community Hall ===
A small non-airconditioned community hall was constructed by the Church for use by its parishioners. It is built over two floors and has a very small car park. The first floor can seat about 300 people and the dining ground floor can seat about 100. Cars are often parked outside the facility in the land belonging to Church. It is not available during the Church festival period.

=== Catholic graveyard ===
A graveyard used for burying the dead parishioners is located near the newly constructed meetinghouse of the Church of Jesus Christ of Latter-day Saints.
