= Puliyur, Chennai =

Village in Tamil Nadu, India

Puliyur is a revenue village in the Egmore taluk of Chennai district in Tamil Nadu, India. It forms part of the Chennai neighbourhood of Kodambakkam.

== History ==
Situated adjoining the neighbourhood of Trustpuram on Arcot Road, Puliyur might have served as the administrative centre of the territory of Puliyur Kottam, one of the 24 kottams of Tondaimandalam during the Chola period. Puliyur Kottam, with its headquarters at Puliyur, comprised the villages which now form part of Central Chennai and South Chennai.
