= Bahram Jung Mosque =

Mosque in Chennai, Tamil Nadu, India

- பஹ்ராம் ஜங் மஸ்ஜித்
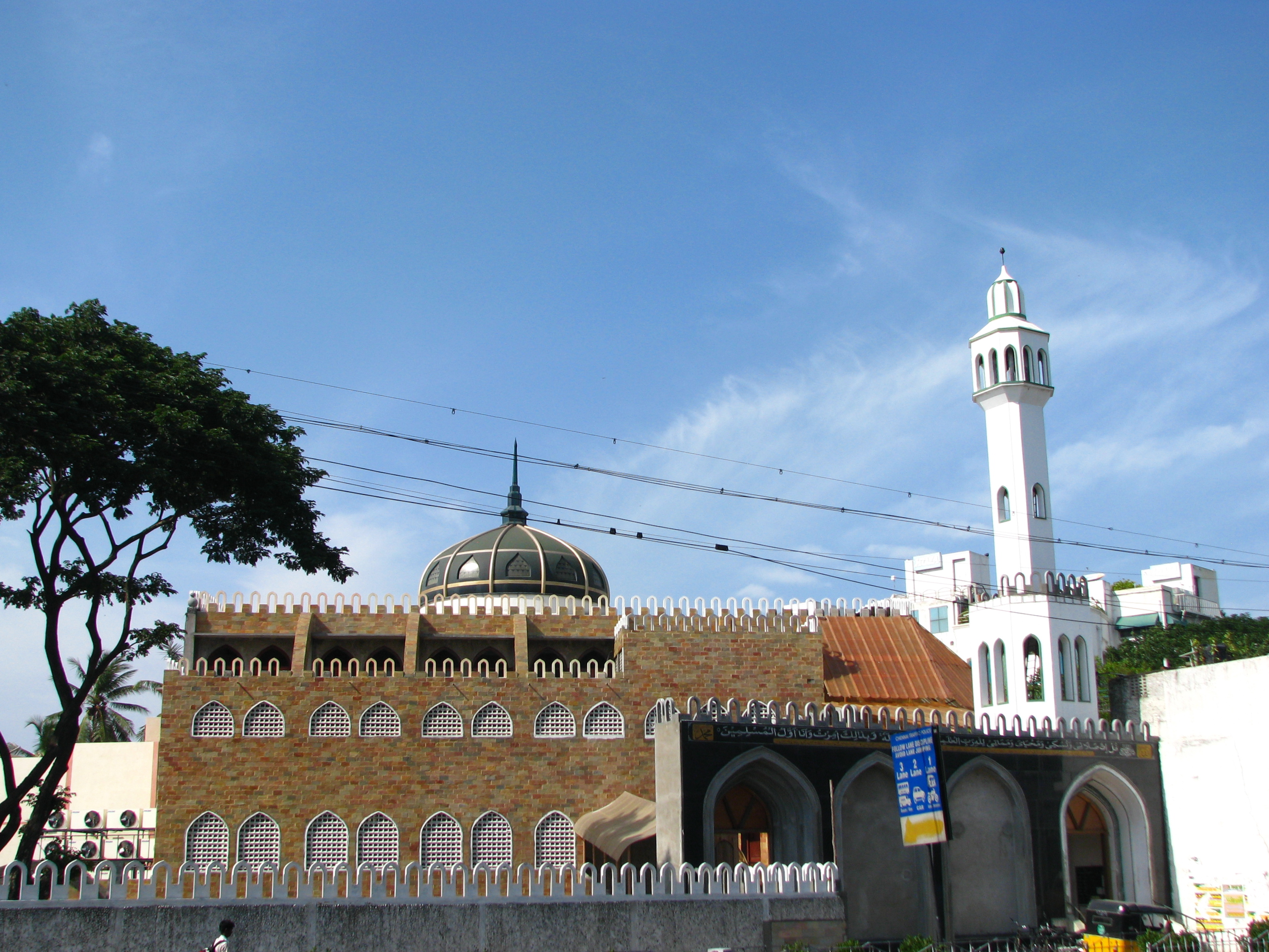
- The mosque in 2009

- Location of the mosque in Chennai

Religion
- Affiliation: Sunni Islam
- Ecclesiastical or organizational status: Mosque
- Status: Active

Location
- Location: Anna Salai, Nandanam, Chennai, Tamil Nadu
- Country: India
- Interactive map of Bahram Jung Mosque
- Coordinates: 13°03′46″N 80°15′52″E

Architecture
- Type: Mosque architecture
- Style: Mughal
- Creator: Muhammad Abdullah Qadir Nawaz Khan Bahadur Bahram Jung
- Groundbreaking: 1789
- Completed: 1795

Specifications
- Dome: One
- Minaret: One

The Bahram Jung Mosque (Tamil: பஹ்ராம் ஜங் மஸ்ஜித்), also known as the Nandanam Mosque, is a Sunni mosque located in the Nandanam neighbourhood of Chennai, in the state of Tamil Nadu, India. The mosque was constructed between 1789 and 1795 by Muhammad Abdullah Qadir Nawaz Khan Bahadur Bahram Jung, a poet in the court of Muhammad Ali Khan Wallajah, the Nawab of the Carnatic.

Bahram Jung and his younger brother, Hafiz Ahmad Khan, who constructed the Hafiz Ahmad Khan Mosque, incurred huge expenses on part of the Carnatic state that on the death of Wallajah's successor, Umdat ul-Umara, the lands belonging to the brothers were confiscated by the East India Company.

Completed in the Mughal style, the architecture of the mosque reflects the grandeur of Islamic design during the Mughal period. The mosque has many intricate carvings and ornate decorations.

The mosque is situated adjacent to Anna Salai, an arterial road.

== See also ==
- Islam in India
- List of mosques in India
