= Battle of Chingleput =

Battle of the Second Carnatic War

- Part of the Second Carnatic War
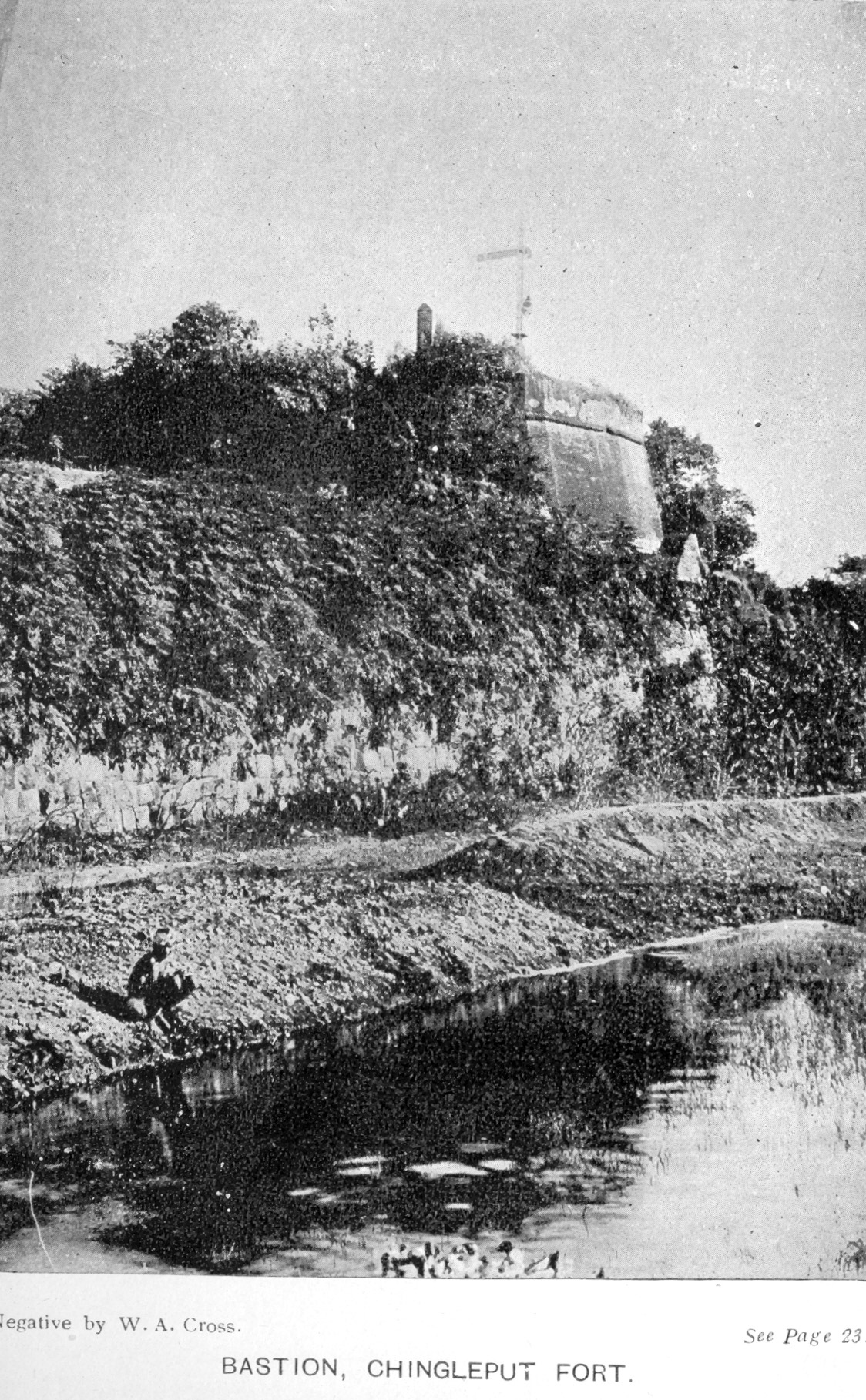
- View of Chingleput Fort in 1913
Date	March 1752
Location	Chingleput, Carnatic (present-day India)
Result	British–Arcot victory

Belligerents
British East India Company; Nawab of Arcot	French East India Company

Commanders and leaders
Robert Clive	Unknown

Strength
200 European recruits 500 sepoys	40 Europeans; 500 troops

Casualties and losses
Unknown	Unknown

The Battle of Chingleput was a short siege in early 1752, during the Second Carnatic War. About 700 East India Company recruits and sepoys under the command of Robert Clive captured the fortress of Chingleput, near Madras, defended by a French East India Company garrison of about 40 Europeans and 500 troops.
