= K. V. Raman =

Kunnapakkam Vinjamur Raman
- Born: 1934; Chingleput, British India (now Chengalpattu, Tamil Nadu, India)
- Died: 27 Niovember 2024; Chennai, Tamil Nadu, India
- Education: Madras Christian College, University of Madras
- Occupations: Historian, Academic, professor, author

Kunnapakkam Vinjamur Raman (c 1934 - 27 November 2024) was an Indian historian and archaeologist who headed the Archaeological Survey of India team that carried out excavations in Arikamedu in 1966-67 and Kaveripoompattinam in 1972-73. He also served as professor of Ancient History and Archaeology at the University of Madras from 1976 to 1995. Raman wrote a number of books, the most important of them being The Early History of the Madras Region (1957) based on the paper which he submitted for his M. Litt. thesis.

== Early life and education ==
Raman was born in 1934 in Chingleput, the oldest son of lawyer K. V. Parthasarathi Iyengar and his wife Janaki. Graduating in history from the Madras Christian College where he was a student of A. J. Boyd, Raman completed his post-graduation from the University of Madras. His book The Early History of the Madras Region based on the thesis he submitted for his M. Litt. degree in 1957 is a widely acknowledged classic and carries a foreword by eminent historian K. A. Nilakanta Sastri. Raman completed his PhD, submitting a thesis on the Varadharaja Perumal Temple, Kanchipuram.

== Career ==
Raman joined the faculty of Ancient History and Archaeology at the University of Madras in 1955. Upon completing his doctorate, he joined the exploration wing of the Archaeological Survey of India. He was a graduate of the first batch of the ASI's Institute of Archaeology and participated in the excavations at Poompuhar, which he considered to be the most exciting of his archaeological work. Raman served with the ASI till 1976 before joining the faculty of Ancient History and Archaeology of the University of Madras where he served as professor till retirement in 1995.

== Later life and death ==
In his later years, Raman guided young research scholars. Many of his works were republished and a reprint of his The Early History of the Madras Region was brought out by The C. P. Ramaswami Aiyar Foundation in 2008. Raman died on 27 November 2024 at his house in Chennai.

== Works ==
Raman wrote over a thousand articles and books on history, archaeology, epigraphy and numismatics. Some of his important works are:

- Raman, K. V. (1959). The Early History of the Madras Region. Amudha Nilayam Private Ltd. (republished by The C. P. Ramaswami Aiyar Foundation in 2008)
- Raman, K. V. (1968). Excavations at Poompuhar, Handbook put by II World Tamil Conference.
- Raman, K. V. (1975). Sri Varadarajaswami Temple, Kanchi. Abhinav Publications.
- Raman, K. V. (1984). Aspects of Indian History and Culture.
- Archaeology, History and Numismatics of South India.
- Raman, K. V. (1988). Port Towns of Tamil Nadu.
- Raman, K. V. (2006). Temple Arts, Icons and culture of India and South-East Asia.
