= Chingleput Ryots' case =

The Chingleput Ryots' Case was a prominent trial which took place in the Chingleput District of the Madras Presidency in India between 1881 and 1883. The action of the M. E. Grant Duff provoked outrage all over the Presidency. Indian nationalists frequently cited the case as an example of the alleged unjust rule of the British Raj.

== Origin ==
In May 1881, a group of ryots in the Chingleput district accused an Indian tahsildar of extortion and filed a case against him in a local court. The tahsildar tried to threaten the ryots with dire consequences and allegedly got the District Collector of Chingleput to prosecute them for perjury. However, the tahsildar was still convicted for tampering with official records and sentenced to rigorous imprisonment. The tahsildar filed a fresh appeal in the Madras High Court resulting in the reduction of the sentence from two years to one. Dissatisfied, the tahsildar appealed once again against the verdict. Though the Madras High Court refused to entertain a second appeal, the Governor of Madras intervened and issued an order on 31 May 1883 acquitting the tahsildar due to lack of evidence:

The Governor in Council, after considering the further opinions expressed by the Judges of the High Court in this peculiar case, has come to the conclusion that it will be most consistent with justice to give the accused the benefit of the doubt raised by the subsequent evidence, and he is accordingly pleased under Section 401, Code of Criminal Procedure, to remit the remainder of the sentence

The District Collector of Chingleput who had allegedly shielded the corrupt tahsildar later acted as the Revenue Secretary of the Government of Madras.

== Reaction ==
The Governor was heavily condemned and criticised by the Indian press for acquitting the corrupt tahsildar. The Hindu, which had supported the ryots throughout the trial and even collected money to fight the case on their behalf, charged him with allowing the affair "to cast dirt on the fair face of British Justice".

The incident was brought before the House of Commons and Sir John Gorst, the Under-Secretary of State for India was questioned by James Tuite, the Member of Parliament for North Westmeath in February 1887.
