= Chengalpattu taluk =

Taluk of Chengalpattu district

Coordinates: 12°41′N 79°59′E

Chengalpattu
- Taluk
- Chengalpattu
- Interactive map of Chengalpattu
- Country: India

Area
  - Total: 149.46 km^{2} (57.71 sq mi)

Population (2011)
  - Total: 210,306
  - Density: 1,407.1/km^{2} (3,644.4/sq mi)

Chengalpattu taluk is a taluk of Chengalpattu district of the Indian state of Tamil Nadu. The headquarters of the taluk is the town of Chengalpattu.

== History ==
This taluk was once a part of the Kanchipuram district until the district was bifurcated and a new district Chengalpattu district was created.

== Administration ==
The taluk is administered by the Tahsildar office located in Chengalpattu.
