= Kodambakkam =

- Neighbourhood
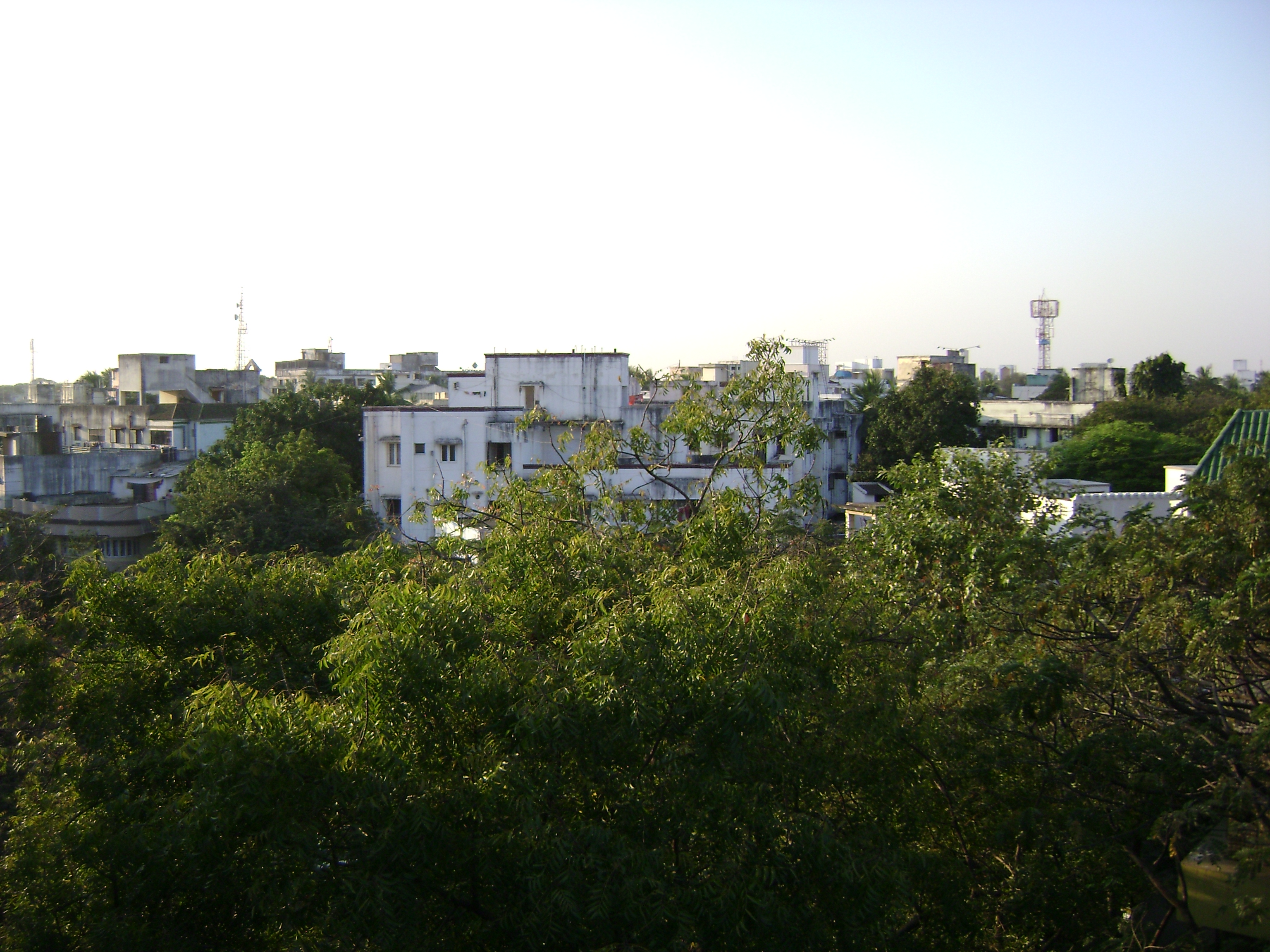

- Kodambakkam கோடபாக்கம் (Chennai) Kodambakkam (Tamil Nadu) Kodambakkam (India)
- Coordinates: 13.0535°N 80.2255°E
- Country: India
- State: Tamil Nadu
- District: Chennai District
- Metro: Chennai
- Zone: Zone 10 – Kodambakkam Zone
- Ward: Ward No. 127,130,131,133,134
- Talukas: Mambalam Taluk

Government
  - Body: Greater Chennai Corporation
- Elevation: 63 m (207 ft)

Languages
  - Official: Tamil
- Time zone: UTC+5:30 (IST)
- PIN: 600024
- Vehicle registration: TN-09
- Lok Sabha constituency: Chennai South
- Legislative Assembly constituency: Theagarayanagar (T Nagar)
- Planning agency: CMDA
- Civic agency: Greater Chennai Corporation

Kodambakkam is a business and residential neighbourhood in Central Chennai, Tamil Nadu, India. The neighbourhood is served by Kodambakkam railway station of the Chennai Suburban Railway Network. Kodambakkam has a high concentration of film studios and has been known for its status as the hub of the Tamil film industry, lending its name to the industry's monicker Kollywood, a portmanteau of Kodambakkam and Hollywood.

== Location ==
Kodambakkam is situated at 13.0481 N latitude and 80.2214 E longitude. It is one of the westerly located neighbourhoods of Chennai city. It is bounded by the neighbourhoods of Nungambakkam to the east, West Mambalam and T. Nagar to the south, Vadapalani to the west, Choolaimedu to the north and K. K. Nagar and Ashok Nagar to the south-west.

Kodambakkam is located at a distance of 8 kilometres from Fort St. George.

== Etymology ==
It is believed that the name "Kodambakkam" itself might have been derived from the Urdu word Ghoda Bagh meaning "garden of horses". Another version says that "Kodambakkam" derives its name from "Karkodagan Pakkam". Karkodagan is the name of a famous snake in Hindu mythology. It is said that the snake worshiped Lord Shiva here. There is still a temple for Lord Shiva by the name Vengeeshwarar in Kodambakkam. Several sculptures and images of the snake Karkodagan can be seen in the temple, even today. There is another etymology for this name from Soundarya Lahari according to Sudha Seshayyan. In "Kodu-am-bakkam", Kodu means hill, Am denotes arrow. The place is associated with lord Shiva using the Meru mountain as bow for destroying Tripura.

== History ==
The neighbourhood of Kodambakkam has a history going back to about 2,000 years. During the period of the Pallavas and the Later Cholas, the western part of Kodambakkam formed a portion of the historically important temple town of Vadapalani. One of the oldest temples in Kodambakkam is the Bharthukesavar temple which is over 500 years old.

Present-day Kodambakkam originated in the 17th and 18th centuries CE, when it supposedly served as source for the horses of the stable of the Nawab of the Carnatic.

Under the British, Kodambakkam was administered as a municipality in Chingleput district till the draining of the Long Tank in 1921, when Kodambakkam was incorporated into the Madras city and formed the Kodambakkam-Saligrammam-Puliyur district of Greater Madras along with other localities to the west of the now extinct Long Tank, with a population of 497 people in 1939. Kodambakkam also played an important role in the Anti-Hindi agitations of 1938 when Maraimalai Adigal presided over a conference denouncing the imposition of Hindi in the Madras Presidency on 3 June 1938.

The first movie studio was established by Avichi Meiyappa Chettiar in 1948. Since then, a number of other movie studios have been established, notable among them being L. V. Prasad Studios and Vijaya Vauhini studios. Liberty theatre, which was the oldest movie theater in Chennai, was based here. It was the place to be seen in the 1950s for movie premieres. However, the theater was demolished in 2010 and was replaced by a hotel and condominiums.

Liberty theatre - once a famous land mark in Kodambakkam

== Infrastructure ==
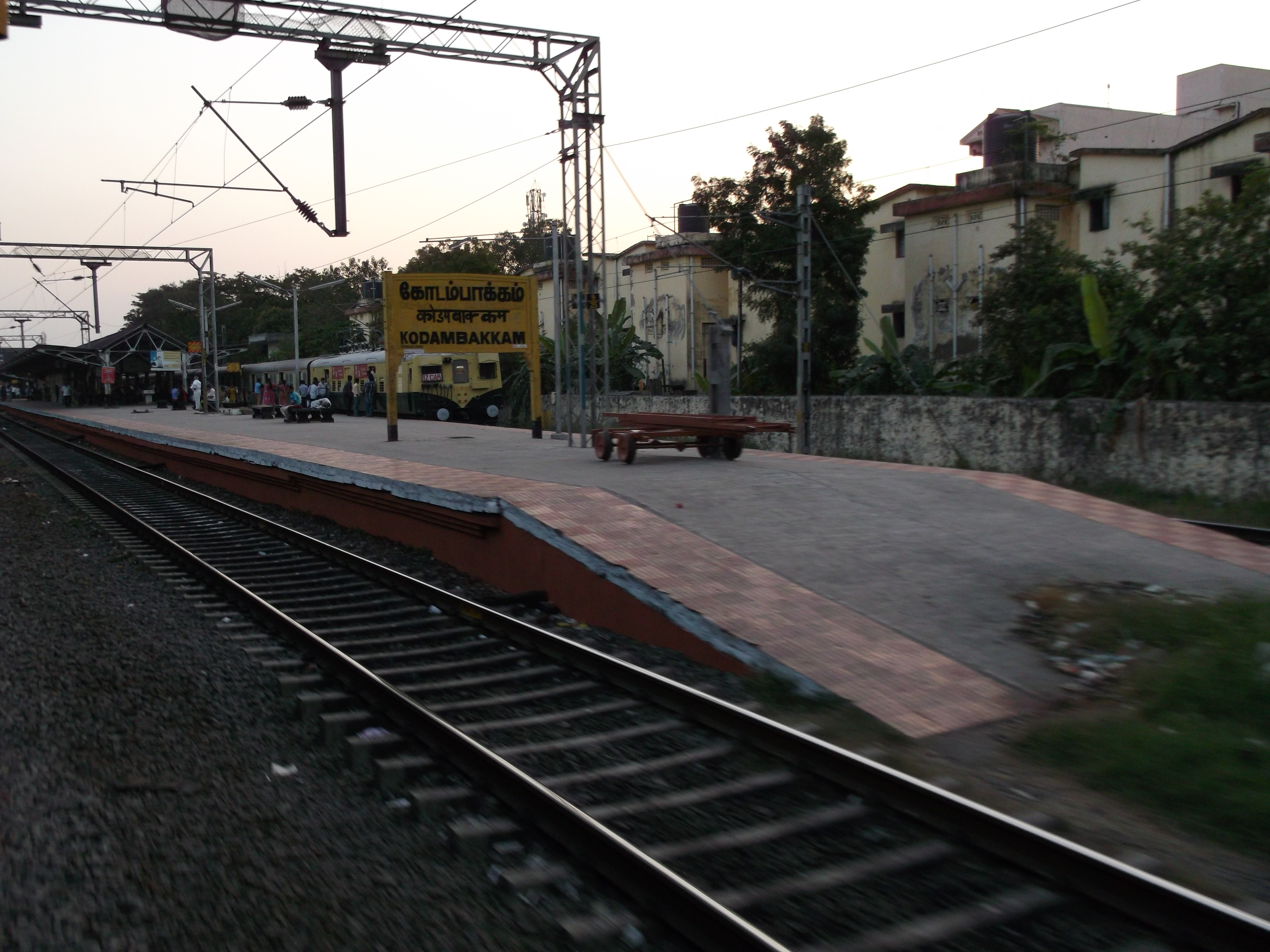
Kodambakkam Railway Station

The neighbourhood got one of the city's first flyovers in 1967. It is 623 m long and 12.8 m wide and connects the localities of K. K. Nagar, Vadapalani, and Ashok Nagar. The district is also home to the Meenakshi Sundararajan Engineering College, which is affiliated to Anna University.

== Religion ==
There are old temples dedicated to Lord Shiva namely Vengeeswarar Temple and Bharadvajeswarar (Valeswarar) Temple belonging to 13th Century built during Chola Period. One of the oldest mosque in Chennai named Puliyur Juma Masjid is situated here.

== Film industry ==
Kodambakkam is the centre of the Tamil film industry known as Kollywood, a portmanteau of Kodambakkam and Hollywood. A. V. M. Studios established by Avichi Meiyappa Chettiar was the first movie studio to be established in Vadapalani-Kodambakkam. The Vijaya Vauhini Studios was established a little later followed by Prasad Labs in 1974. Today, many Tamil movie studios are located in and around Kodambakkam.

Residences of many film and television stars are located in and around Kodambakkam due to proximity to the movie studios. A film directors' colony situated in Kodambakkam is the home of many Tamil film directors and producers.

== Music industry ==
Indian music director A. R. Rahman's house and his office Panchathan Record Inn and AM Studios is located in the same street.

Indian music composer Ilaiyaraaja's self-owned musical studio "Ilaiyaraaja Studios" is located at Kodambakkam High Road.

== Localities ==
Some of the localities of Kodambakkam include:

- Rangarajapuram
- Trustpuram
- Puliyur
- United India Colony
- Vishwanthapuram
- Ganga Nagar
- Dhanakodiammal Street
- Power House
