= Hindu College railway station =

Railway station in Chennai, India

Hindu College Hindu Kalluri

General information
- Location: Chennai–Tiruvallur High Road, Pattabiram, Chennai, Tamil Nadu, India
- Coordinates: 13°7′7″N 80°4′30″E
- System: Indian Railways and Chennai Suburban Railway station
- Owner: Ministry of Railways, Indian Railways
- Lines: West, West North and West South lines of Chennai Suburban Railway
- Platforms: 2
- Tracks: 4

Construction
- Structure type: Standard on-ground station
- Parking: Available

Other information
- Station code: HC
- Fare zone: Southern Railways

History
- Electrified: 29 November 1979
- Former names: South Indian Railway

Services
Preceding station	Chennai Suburban	Following station
Pattabiram towards Arakkonam Junction	West Line	Avadi towards Chennai Central MMC
Pattabiram towards Pattabiram East Depot	West Line Siding	Avadi towards Chennai Central MMC
Route map
Chennai Central MMC — Jolarpet
Location

Hindu College railway station, Chennai is one of the railway stations of the Chennai Central–Arakkonam section of the Chennai Suburban Railway Network. Located about 24 km from Chennai Central railway station, the station serves the neighbourhoods of Pattabiram a suburb of Chennai. It has an elevation of 28 m above sea level.

The Hindu College is among the colleges in India to have a railway station very near. The other two are A. M. Jain College (Meenambakkam) and Loyola college (Nungambakkam)

== History ==
The lines at the station were electrified on 29 November 1979, with the electrification of the Chennai Central–Tiruvallur section.

== The station ==
=== Platforms ===
There are a total of 2 platforms and 4 tracks. The platforms are connected by foot overbridge. These platforms are built to accumulate 24 coaches express train.

=== Station layout ===
G	North Entrance Street level	Exit/Entrance & ticket counter
P	Track 4	Towards → MGR Chennai Central
P	Track 3	Towards ← Arakkonam Junction / Jolarpettai Junction
P	FOB, Island platform | P2 Doors will open on the left | T3 & T4 – Express Lines
P	Platform 2	Towards → Chennai Central MMC next station is Avadi
P	Platform 1	Towards ← Arakkonam Junction next station is Pattabiram
P	FOB, Side platform | P1 Doors will open on the left
G	South Entrance Street level	Exit/Entrance & ticket counter

== Commuter facilities ==
Every day, about 11,000 commuters use the station, including close to 4,000 students, 5,000 officegoers and 2,000 other commuters. Commuters cross the railway tracks from the Hindu College side to reach the suburban platform in the station as there is no foot overbridge. However, in 2005, a foot overbridge was sanctioned and the bridge was constructed in 2008. However, the overbridge was planned in such a way that it will connect only the two suburban platforms leaving out the mainline track, forcing the commuters to cross the railway track.

== See also ==
- Chennai Suburban Railway
- Railway stations in Chennai
