= Senji Panambakkam railway station =

Railway station in Tamil Nadu, India

Senji Panambakkam

General information
- Location: Panambakkam, Tiruvallur district, Tamil Nadu, India
- Coordinates: 13°5′41″N 79°50′7″E
- System: Indian Railways and Chennai Suburban Railway station
- Owner: Ministry of Railways, Indian Railways
- Lines: West, West North and West South lines of Chennai Suburban Railway
- Platforms: 2
- Tracks: 4

Construction
- Structure type: Standard on-ground station

Other information
- Station code: SPAM
- Fare zone: Southern Railways

History
- Electrified: 28 August 1982
- Former names: South Indian Railway

Services
Preceding station	Chennai Suburban	Following station
Manavur towards Arakkonam Junction	West Line	Kadambathur towards Chennai Central MMC
Route map
Chennai Central MMC — Jolarpet
Location

Senji Panambakkam Railway Station is one of the railway stations of the Chennai Central–Arakkonam section of the Chennai Suburban Railway Network. The name represents the village duo: Senji & Panambakkam. It serves the villages of Senji, Panambakkam and Perambakkam, suburbs of Chennai, and is located 51 km west of Chennai Central railway station. It has an elevation of 54 m above sea level.

== History ==
The lines at the station were electrified on 28 August 1982, with the electrification of the Tiruvallur–Arakkonam section.

== Layout ==
The station comes under the Chennai Central-Arakkonam double line section. There are four tracks—two serving exclusively for the suburban trains. The suburban tracks are served by an island platform, on which the station building is situated. A footbridge connects the platform with the neighbourhood.

=== Station layout ===
G	North Entrance Street level	Exit/Entrance & FOB
P	Track 4	Towards → MGR Chennai Central
P	Track 3	Towards ← Arakkonam Junction / Jolarpettai Junction
P	Platform 2	Towards → Chennai Central MMC next station is Kadambathur
P	FOB, Island platform | P1 & P2 Doors will open on the right | T3 & T4 – Express Lines
P	Platform 1	Towards ← Arakkonam Junction next station is Manavur
G	South Entrance Street level	Exit/Entrance, FOB & ticket counter

== See also ==
- Chennai Suburban Railway
