= Avadi railway station =

Railway station in Chennai, India

Avadi
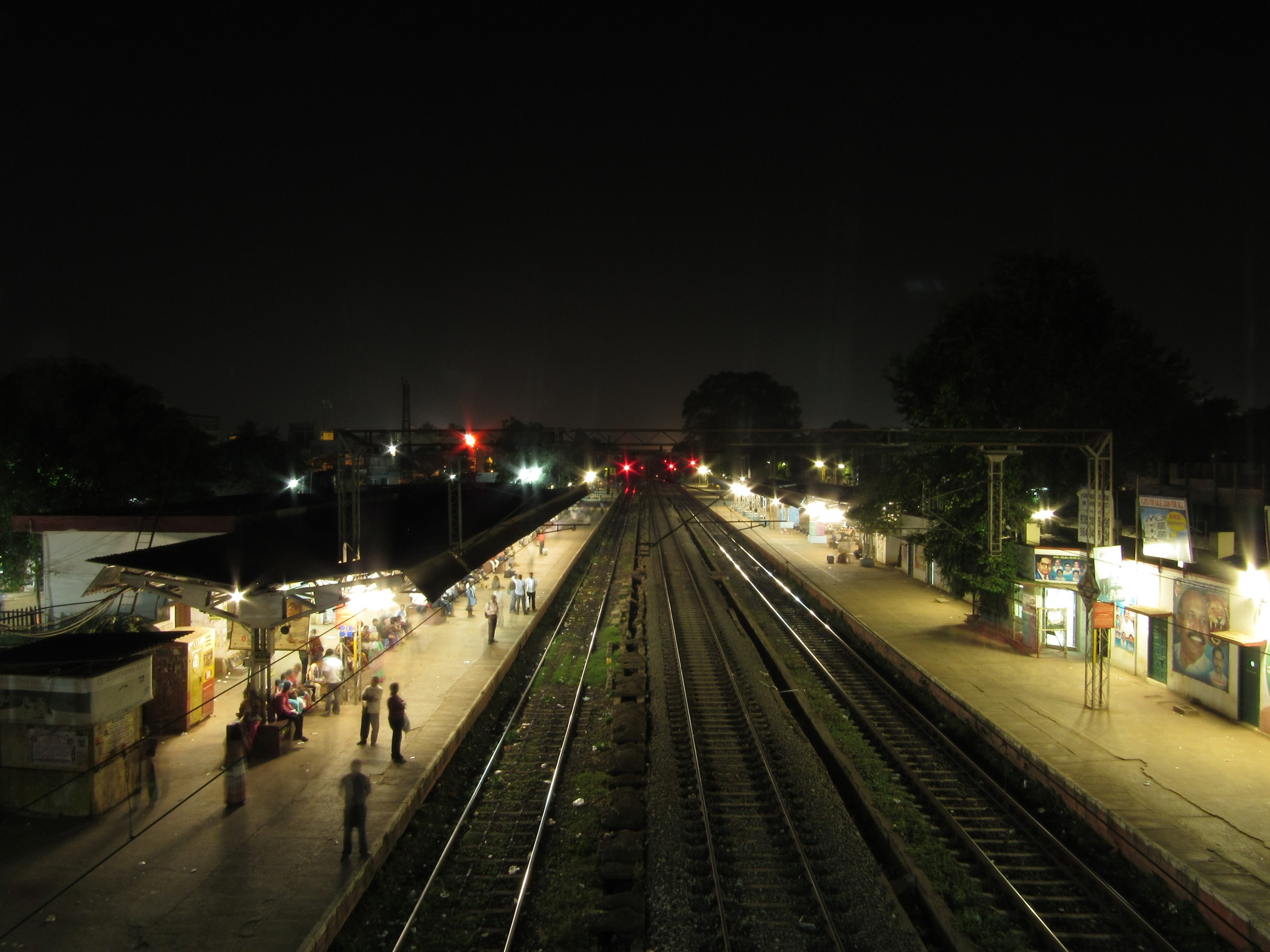
- Avadi railway station at night; Avadi.

General information
- Location: Tirumalairajapuram, Avadi, Chennai, Tamil Nadu, India
- Coordinates: 13.1182°N 80.1016°E
- System: Indian Railways and Chennai Suburban Railway station
- Owner: Ministry of Railways, Indian Railways
- Lines: West, West North and West South lines of Chennai Suburban Railway.
- Platforms: 4
- Tracks: 6
- Connections: MTC, Red Line - Avadi metro station (Proposed)

Construction
- Structure type: Standard on-ground station
- Parking: Available

Other information
- Status: Active
- Station code: AVD
- Zone(s): Southern Railway zone
- Division(s): Chennai

History
- Electrified: 29 November 1979
- Former names: South Indian Railway

Passengers
- 2013: 40,000/day

Services
Preceding station	Chennai Suburban	Following station
Hindu College towards Arakkonam Junction	West Line	Annanur towards Chennai Central MMC
Route map
Chennai Central MMC — Jolarpet
Location

Avadi railway station (station code: AVD) is an NSG–2 category Indian railway station in Chennai railway division of Southern Railway zone. It is one of the major railway terminals of the Chennai Central–Arakkonam section of the Chennai Suburban Railway Network. It serves the neighbourhood of Avadi, a suburb of Chennai located 23 km west of the city centre. It is situated at Tirumalairajapuram locality of Avadi, with an elevation of 26.85 m above sea level. According to a railway release in 2008, there are plans to develop Avadi station as a coaching terminal (satellite terminal) for Chennai Central railway station, on the lines of Tambaram station being developed as a terminal for Egmore railway station. Later in 2023, the plan of making Perambur as 4th railway terminal was considered but not finalised. But, there are repeated requests from commuters to make Avadi as railway terminal.

== History ==
The first lines in the station were electrified on 29 November 1979, with the electrification of the Chennai Central–Tiruvallur section. The EMU car shed lines at Avadi were electrified on 1 February 1980. Additional lines at the station were electrified on 2 October 1986, with the electrification of the Villivakkam–Avadi section.

The electrification preliminaries, such as poles, were observed on the railway lines passing through Avadi Railway Station as early as 1977. The first broad-gauge electric EMUs were first introduced on the Madras Central–Gummidipoondi section by 1979 and in the next phase on the Madras Central–Tiruvallur section around 1980. From around 1971 to 1980, there these beastly WP steam locomotives that were hauling the Suburban trains going up to Tiruvallur and Gumidipoondi. The WDS category shuttle diesel were seen pulling the Pattabiram Military Siding trains going up to E Depot in the Avadi Air Force Station Cantonment Area. It helped identifying the trains. As for the express trains passing through Avadi, those were diesel electrics. In the late 1960s and early 1970s, it was probably the Baldwin Class WP steam locos that were hauling trains such as Dadar Express and Bombay Mail from Kalyan, taking over the duties from the mighty WCM DC Electrics operating on the Bombay–Kalyan route.

== Layout ==
The station has six tracks, including two loop lines, and has four platforms. The first platform is a side platform housing the station's entrance and the ticket counter, and the second and third are part of an island platform. The fourth platform borders the northern end of the station and is the longest of all the platforms. The platforms are connected by means of a footbridge.

As of 2013, the station handles about 40,000 passengers a day.

=== Station layout ===
G	North Entrance Street level	Exit/Entrance & ticket counter
P	FOB, Side platform | P4 – Express Lines
P	Platform 4	Towards → MGR Chennai Central
P	Platform 3	Towards ← Arakkonam Junction / Jolarpettai Junction
P	FOB, Island platform | P2 Doors will open on the left | P3 – Express Lines
P	Platform 2	Towards → Chennai Central MMC next station is Annanur
P	Platform 1	Towards ← Arakkonam Junction next station is Hindu College
P	FOB, Side platform | P1 Doors will open on the left
G	South Entrance Street level	Exit/Entrance & ticket counter

== Projects and development ==
Avadi is one of the 73 stations in Tamil Nadu to be named for upgradation under Amrit Bharat Station Scheme of Indian Railways. It is also in the Chennai Suburban Railway network that are being developed as Adarsh stations.

A metro rail connectivity from Pattabiram to Koyambedu by Red line corridor of Chennai Metro, connecting this railway station and Avadi bus terminus, is approved by Government of Tamil Nadu, with land acquisition near railway station underway.

== See also ==
- Chennai Suburban Railway
- Railway stations in Chennai
