= Nemilichery railway station =

Railway station in Chennai, India

Nemilichery

General information
- Location: Nemilichery, Thiruninravur, Chennai, Tamil Nadu, India
- Coordinates: 13°7′17″N 80°2′43″E
- System: Indian Railways and Chennai Suburban Railway station
- Owner: Ministry of Railways, Indian Railways
- Lines: West, West North and West South lines of Chennai Suburban Railway
- Platforms: 2
- Tracks: 4

Construction
- Structure type: Standard on-ground station
- Parking: Available

Other information
- Station code: NEC
- Fare zone: Southern Railways

History
- Opened: 2010
- Electrified: 29 November 1979
- Former names: South Indian Railway

Services
| Preceding station | Chennai Suburban | Following station |
|---|---|---|
| Thiruninravur towards Arakkonam Junction | West Line | Pattabiram towards Chennai Central MMC |
Route map
Chennai Central MMC — Jolarpet
Location

Nemilichery railway station is one of the railway stations of the Chennai Central–Arakkonam section of the Chennai Suburban Railway Network. It serves the neighbourhood of Nemilichery, Thiruninravur a suburb of Chennai, and is located 27 km west of Chennai Central railway station. It has an elevation of 32.05 m above sea level.

Presently, Nemilichery, with three temporary shelters, is only a halt station and not a full-fledged one. However, all the 71 pairs of slow suburban trains halt at the station.

== History ==
Nemilichery railway station is the newest railway station in the Chennai Central–Arakkonam section of the Chennai Suburban Railway Network. With the two nearest railway stations of Pattabiram and Thirunindravur on the eastern and western sides, respectively, lying 4.01 km apart, there was a demand for a new railway station in the midst of these two stations, which would benefit more than 100,000 people in the neighbourhood. Southern Railway gave its in principle approval for the construction of a new railway station in 2002 and the site inspection was carried out by the then minister of state for railways, A. K. Moorthy, in 2003. The railway station was initially estimated at a cost of ₹ 5.8 million, with the Jaya Group of Educational Institutions contributing ₹ 2.5 million as public contribution towards the construction. The final cost of construction of the station, however, was about ₹ 10 million, including ₹ 3.574 million towards earth work for laying the platform and ₹ 3.828 million towards shifting of tracks.

The station was inaugurated on 5 February 2010. The lines at the station, however, were electrified on 29 November 1979, with the electrification of the Chennai Central–Tiruvallur section.

The subway connecting the two sides of the neighbourhoods was completed by March 2016 and was commissioned to public use on 21 April 2016

== Station Layout ==
There are a total of 4 platforms and 4 tracks. The platforms are connected by foot overbridge. These platforms are built to accumulate 24 coaches express train.

| G | North Entrance Street level | Exit/Entrance |
| P | Track 4 | Towards → MGR Chennai Central |
| P | Track 3 | Towards ← Arakkonam Junction / Jolarpettai Junction |
| P | Platform 2 | Towards → Chennai Central MMC next station is Pattabiram |
| P | FOB, Island platform | P1 & P2 Doors will open on the right | T3 & T4 – Express Lines |
| P | Platform 1 | Towards ← Arakkonam Junction next station is Thiruninravur |
| G | South Entrance Street level | Exit/Entrance & ticket counter |

== Neighbourhoods ==
The station serves the neighbourhood, including East Thiruninravur, Srinath Nagar, TI Nagar, Gomathi Amman Nagar, Ambal Nagar, Nehru Nagar, Nemilichery, Annambedu, West Thandurai, Abirami Nagar, and Rajankuppam.

== See also ==
- Chennai Suburban Railway
- Railway stations in Chennai
