= Ambattur railway station =

Railway station in Chennai, India

Ambattur

General information
- Location: Varadarajapuram, Ambattur, Chennai, Tamil Nadu, India
- Coordinates: 13.114342°N 80.152524°E
- System: Indian Railways and Chennai Suburban Railway station
- Owner: Ministry of Railways, Indian Railways
- Lines: West, West North and West South lines of Chennai Suburban Railway
- Platforms: 3
- Tracks: 8
- Connections: Red Line - Ambattur metro station (Proposed)

Construction
- Structure type: Standard on-ground station
- Parking: Available

Other information
- Station code: ABU
- Fare zone: Southern Railways

History
- Electrified: 29 November 1979
- Former names: South Indian Railway

Passengers
- 2013: 50,000/day

Services
Preceding station	Chennai Suburban	Following station
Thirumullaivoyal towards Arakkonam Junction	West Line	Pattaravakkam towards Chennai Central
Route map
Chennai Central MMC — Jolarpet
Location
- Location within India Location within Tamil Nadu

Ambattur railway station is one of the main railway stations of the Chennai Central–Arakkonam section of the Chennai Suburban Railway Network. It serves the neighbourhood of Ambattur, a suburb of Chennai located 17 km north-west of the city centre. It is situated at Varadarajapuram in Ambattur, with an elevation of 19.18 metres above sea level.

== History ==
Platform 1 with the name board at the station (a view towards west)

The first lines in the station were electrified on 29 November 1979, with the electrification of the Chennai Central–Tiruvallur section. Additional lines at the station were electrified on 2 October 1986, with the electrification of the Villivakkam–Tiruninravur section.

On 21 January 1946 at 4.15 p.m., Mahatma Gandhi visited the station, who was received by Kamaraj.

== The Station ==
The station has 8 tracks, including 4 loop lines, and has 3 platforms.

=== Station layout ===
G	North Entrance Street level	Level crossing Entry/Exit & Ticket counter
P
P	Platform 3	Towards ← Arakkonam Junction / Jolarpettai Junction
P	FOB, Island platform | P2 Doors will open on the left | P3 – Express Lines
P	Platform 2	Towards → Chennai Central next station is Pattaravakkam
P	Platform 1	Towards ← Arakkonam Junction next station is Thirumullaivoyal
P	FOB, Side platform | P1 Doors will open on the left
G	South Entrance Street level	Entrance/Exit & Ticket Counter

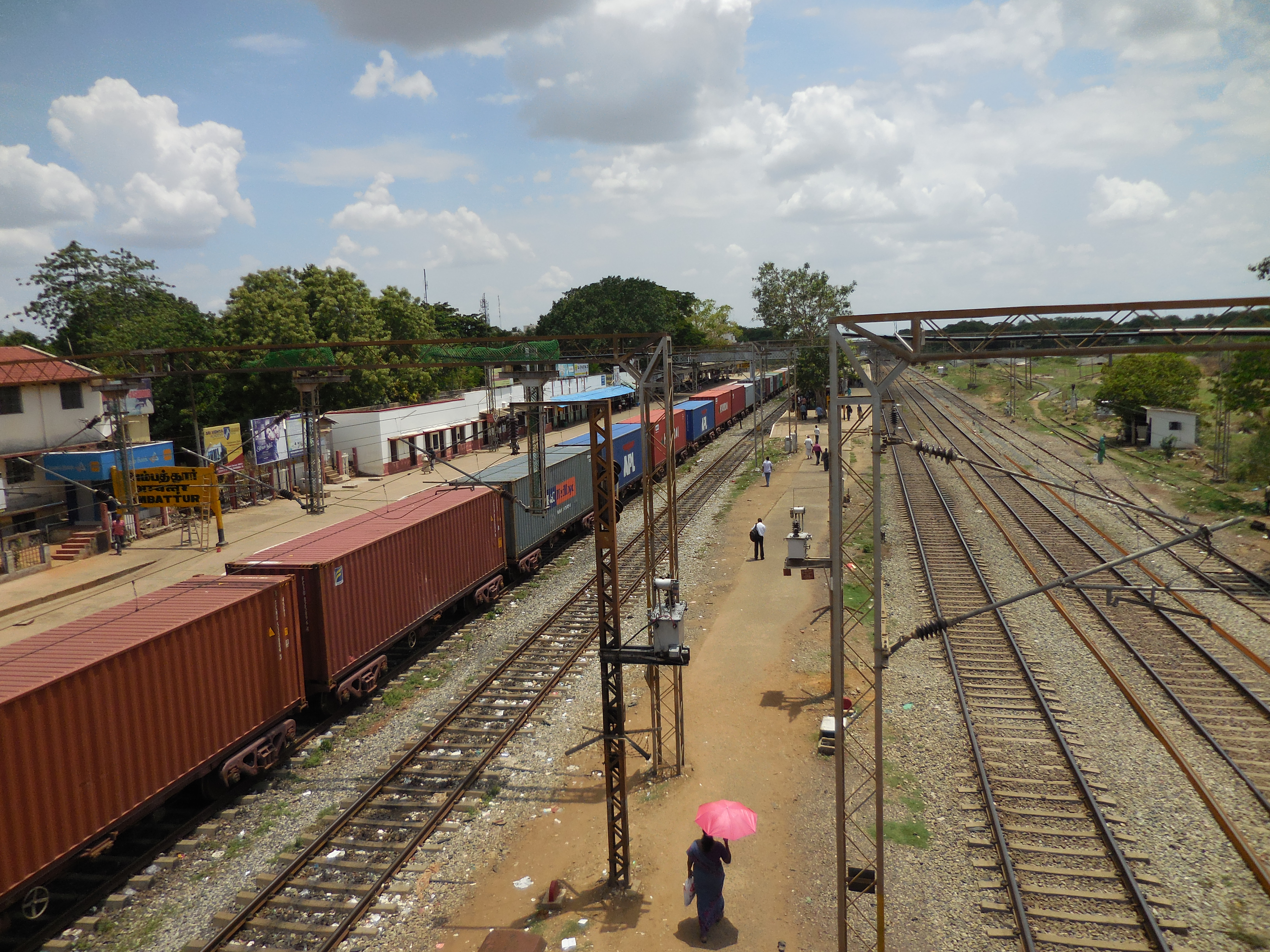
Main lines visible at the right (a view towards west)

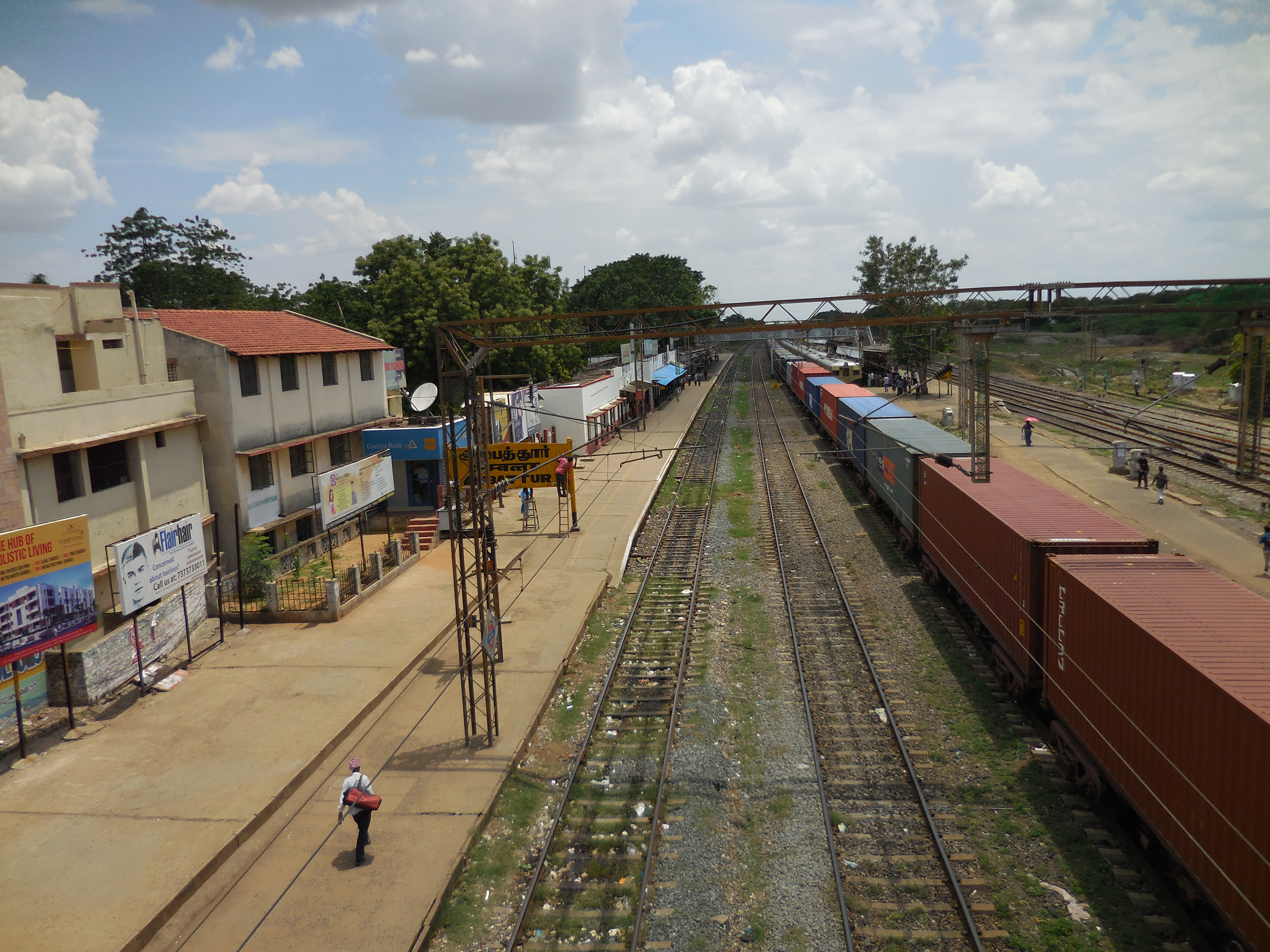
Suburban lines at the station (a view towards west)

=== Legend ===
A railway concrete sleeper manufacturing company was located at the northwestern side of the station until 2015, which is served by loop lines radiating from the station.

As of 2013, the station handles about 50,000 passengers a day. This includes commuters from areas around Ambattur such as Padi, Mannurpet, Karukku, Kallikuppam, Menambedu and Pattaravakkam. Every day, suburban trains make around 260 trips through the station.

== Projects and development ==
According to a railway release in 2008, there were plans to develop the station as a coaching terminal (satellite terminal) for Chennai Central railway station, on the lines of Tambaram station being developed as a terminal for Egmore railway station. In June 2014, the station was renovated in a major way after decades of neglect. In 2019, work on the extension of platforms to accommodate 24-rake long-distance trains began. Due to space constraints in Ambattur Railway station, Southern railway in 2023, decided that Perambur would cater as satellite terminal station, though the plan is not finalised. But, there are repeated requests from commuters to make Avadi as 4th railway terminal.

In 2019, a new footbridge connecting Platforms 1 and 2 only, was constructed, replacing the existing one.

In October 2023, the footbridge connecting South Park street and Bazaar street at level crossing, which laid unused was removed. To eliminate accidents due to level-crossing of tracks and to increase sectional-speed of express trains, a 2-wheeler cum pedestrian underground subway planned by Southern Railway for ₹9.5 crore is under construction, which was planned to be opened by March 2024, but getting delayed due to city corporation's neglect in building entry-exit ramp to subway.

=== Development under Amrit Bharat Station Scheme ===
In November 2023, the Ministry of Railways under the Second Modi ministry laid out plans for upgrading the Ambattur station to international standards at a cost of ₹ 21.67 crore. Amrit Bharat Station Scheme has been developed under which basic facilities are being provided to passengers at major railway stations. Ambattur railway station, which is one of the major and busiest railway station in North Chennai region, is going to get a makeover under the new railway project. A railway station with a new facade is to be constructed. A new 12 metre wide footbridge is also planned to be constructed.

With this, the face of Ambattur railway station is going to change completely. The old building will be renovated and various facilities will be provided. This work is scheduled to be completed by March 2024.

== Connectivity ==
Ambattur Railway station boasts of good connectivity to nearby suburban areas of Ambattur such as Venkatapuram, Menambedu, Pudur and SIDCO industrial areas. The nearest bus stops are Ambattur OT and Canara Bank, which is situated 800 metres and 500 metres respectively, from the station. Mini buses and autos ply along the station to nearby suburbs.

The station also has an access to market areas of robust businesses with close proximity to Ambattur Industrial Estate and its Ambit IT Park.

A metro rail connectivity to Koyambedu by Red line corridor of Chennai Metro, connecting this railway station is approved by Government of Tamil Nadu, with land acquisition near railway station underway.

== See also ==
- Chennai Suburban Railway
- Railway stations in Chennai
