= Pattabiram railway station =

Railway station in Chennai, India

Pattabiram
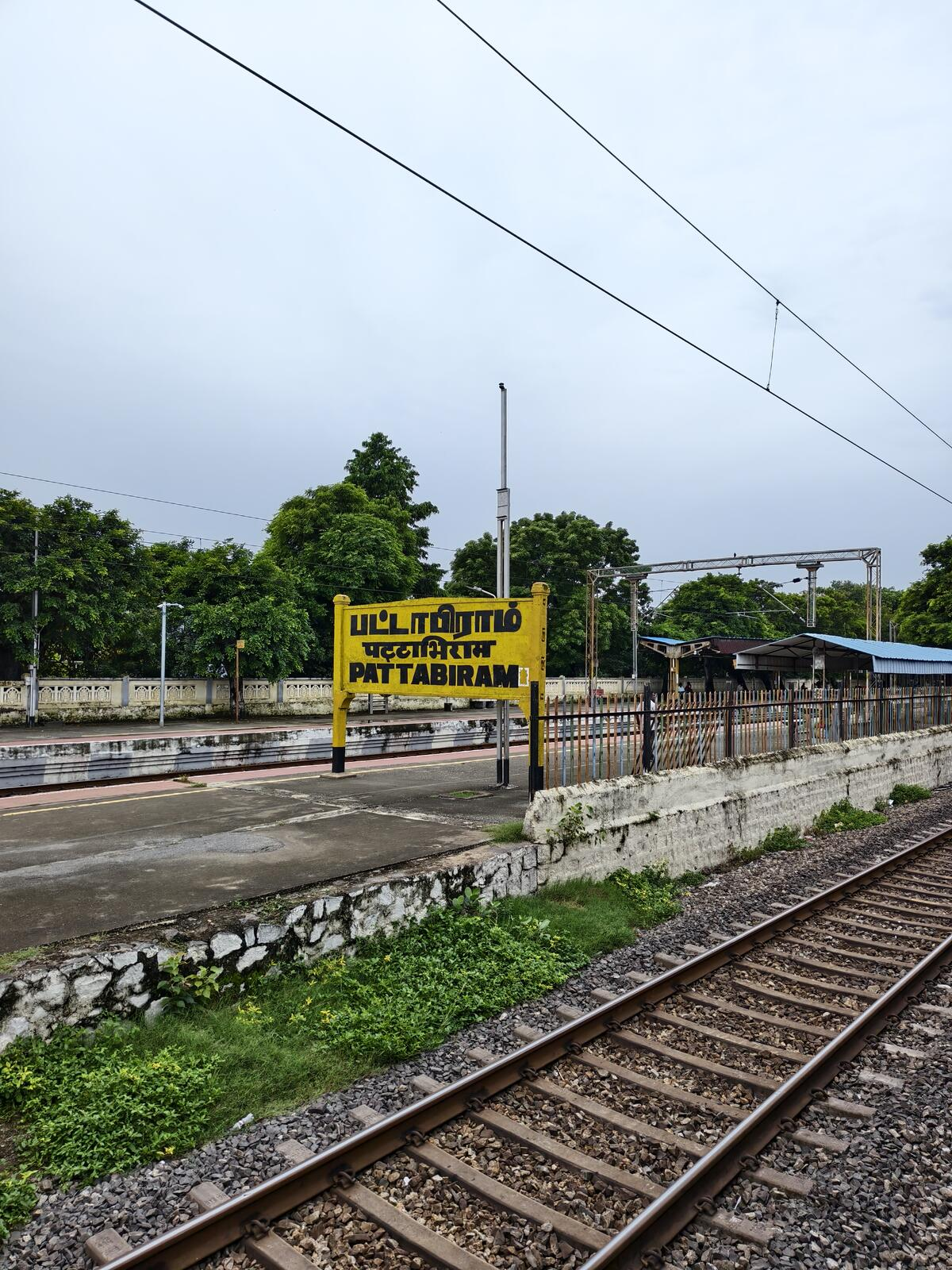
- Sign board at PAB

General information
- Location: Chennai–Tiruvallur High Road, Pattabiram, Chennai, Tamil Nadu 600 072, India
- Coordinates: 13°7′7″N 80°3′54″E
- System: Indian Railways and Chennai Suburban Railway station
- Owner: Ministry of Railways, Indian Railways
- Lines: West, West North and West South lines of Chennai Suburban Railway
- Platforms: 2
- Tracks: 4

Construction
- Structure type: Standard on-ground station
- Parking: Available

Other information
- Station code: PAB
- Fare zone: Southern Railways

History
- Electrified: 29 November 1979
- Former names: South Indian Railway

Passengers
- 2013: 16,000/day

Services
Preceding station	Chennai Suburban	Following station
Nemilichery towards Arakkonam Junction	West Line	Hindu College towards Chennai Central MMC
Pattabiram West towards Pattabiram East Depot	West Line Siding	Hindu College towards Chennai Central MMC
Route map
Chennai Central MMC — Jolarpet
Location

Pattabiram railway station is one of the railway stations of the Chennai Central–Arakkonam section of the Chennai Suburban Railway Network. Located about 25 km from Chennai Central railway station, it is a suburb situated on the western part of Chennai, India. the station serves the neighbourhoods of Pattabiram. It has an elevation of 31 m above sea level.

== History ==
The lines at the station were electrified on 29 November 1979, with the electrification of the Chennai Central–Tiruvallur section.

== The station ==
=== Platforms ===
There are a total of 2 platforms and 4 tracks. The platforms are connected by foot overbridge. These platforms are built to accumulate 24 coaches express train.

=== Station layout ===
G	North Entrance Street level	Exit/Entrance, FOB & ticket counter
P	Track 4	Towards → MGR Chennai Central
P	Track 3	Towards ← Arakkonam Junction / Jolarpettai Junction
P	FOB, Island platform | P2 Doors will open on the left | T3 & T4 – Express Lines
P	Platform 2	c
P	Platform 1	Towards ← Arakkonam Junction next station is Nemilichery
P	FOB, Side platform | P1 Doors will open on the left
G	South Entrance Street level	Exit/Entrance & ticket counter
	FOB, Side platform
Platform 3	Towards Pattabiram E Depot next station is Pattabiram Military Siding

== Commuter facilities ==
Around 16,000 commuters use the station every day. In 2002, the railway department allotted ₹ 12 million for improving passenger amenities at the Pattabiram and Puliamangalam stations. A bridge connecting north bazaar with south bazaar over level crossing 10 at the Tiruvallur end of the railway station was inaugurated in 2010 and has a fleet of steps on either end for commuters to access the bridge. The bridge caters to about 50 villages with a population of over 60,000. The residents are demanding that a road overbridge be built to replace the other level crossing.

== See also ==
- Chennai Suburban Railway
- Pattabiram east depot railway
- Pattabiram west Railway
- Railway stations in Chennai
