= Vyasarpadi Jeeva railway station =

Railway station in Chennai, India

Vyasarpadi Jiva
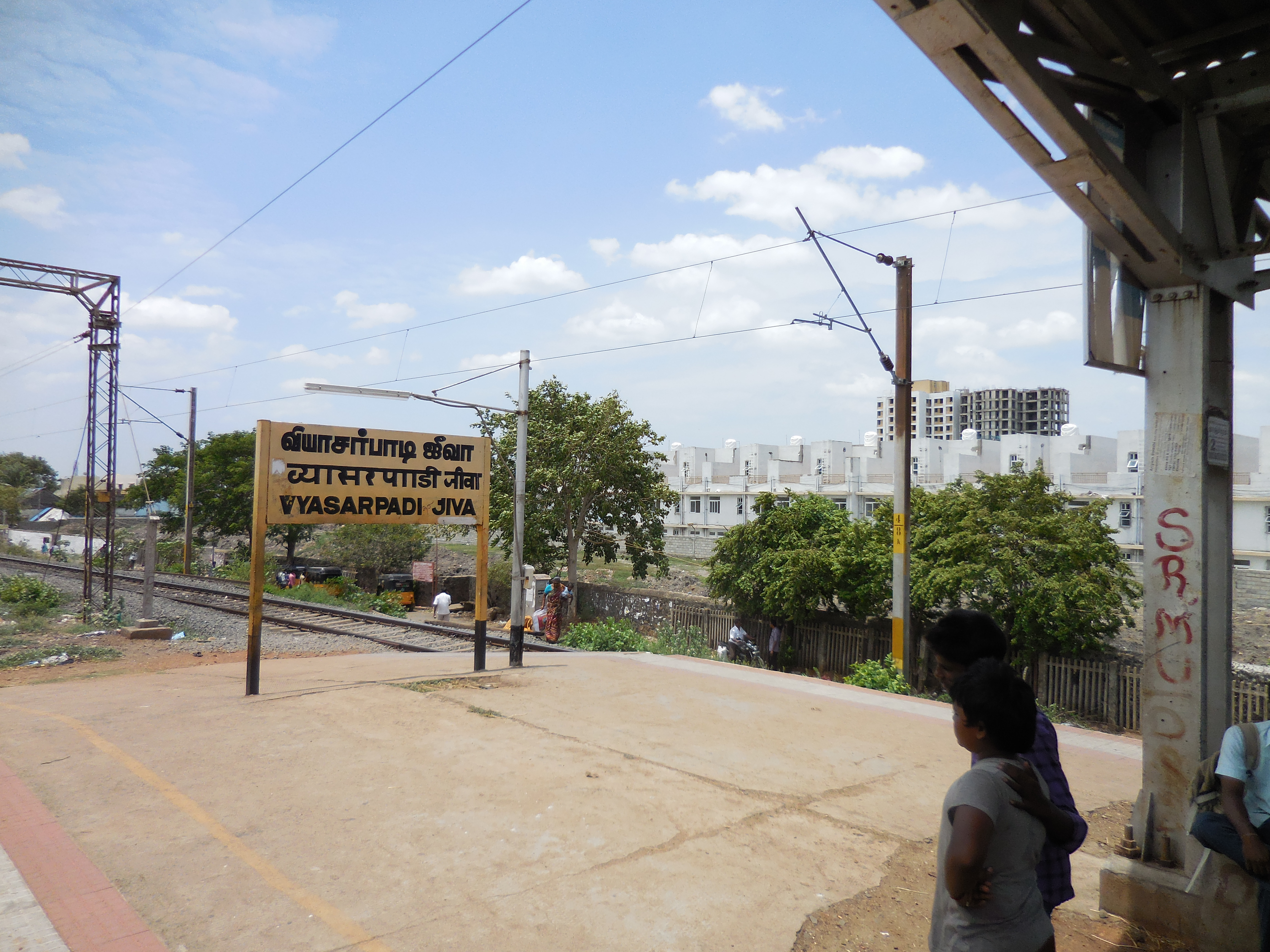
- Eastern end of Vyasarpadi Jiva railway station

General information
- Location: Vyasarpadi, Chennai, Tamil Nadu, India
- Coordinates: 13°6′32″N 80°15′27″E
- System: Indian Railways and Chennai Suburban Railway station
- Owner: Ministry of Railways, Indian Railways
- Lines: West, West North and West South lines of Chennai Suburban Railway
- Platforms: 2 (Island platform)
- Tracks: 4

Construction
- Structure type: Standard on-ground station
- Parking: Available

Other information
- Station code: VJM
- Fare zone: Southern Railways

History
- Electrified: 29 November 1979
- Former names: South Indian Railway
Location

Vyasarpadi Jiva railway station is one of the railway station of the Chennai Central–Arakkonam section of the Chennai Suburban Railway Network. It serves the neighbourhood of Vyasarpadi. It is located 4 km to the northwest of Chennai Central railway station and 4 km to the west of Chennai Beach railway station. The station lies at the western end of the 'diamond junction' of Chennai's railway network, where all the lines of the Chennai Suburban Railway meet. It has an elevation of 5 m above sea level.

== History ==
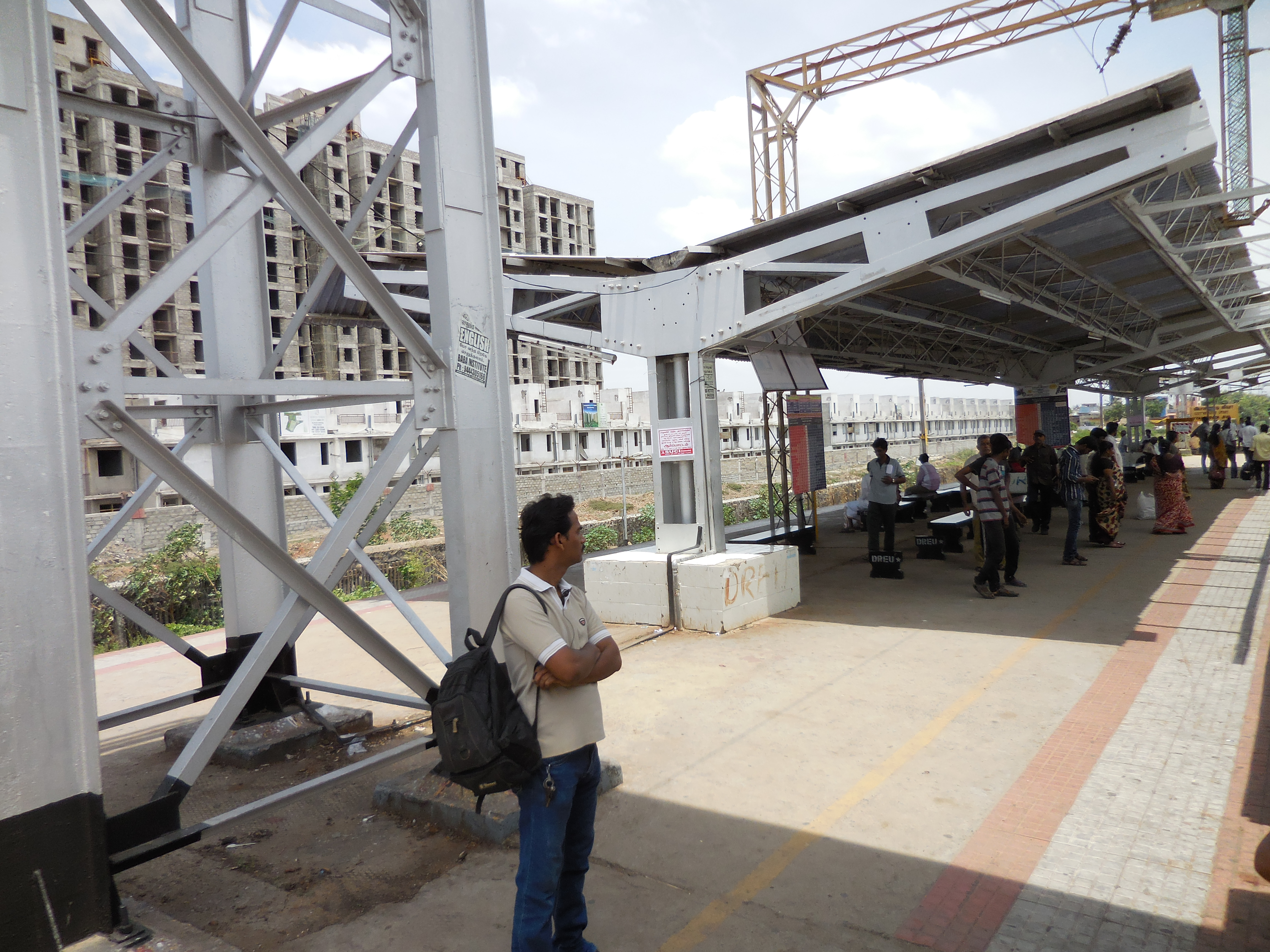
A view of the island platform at the station

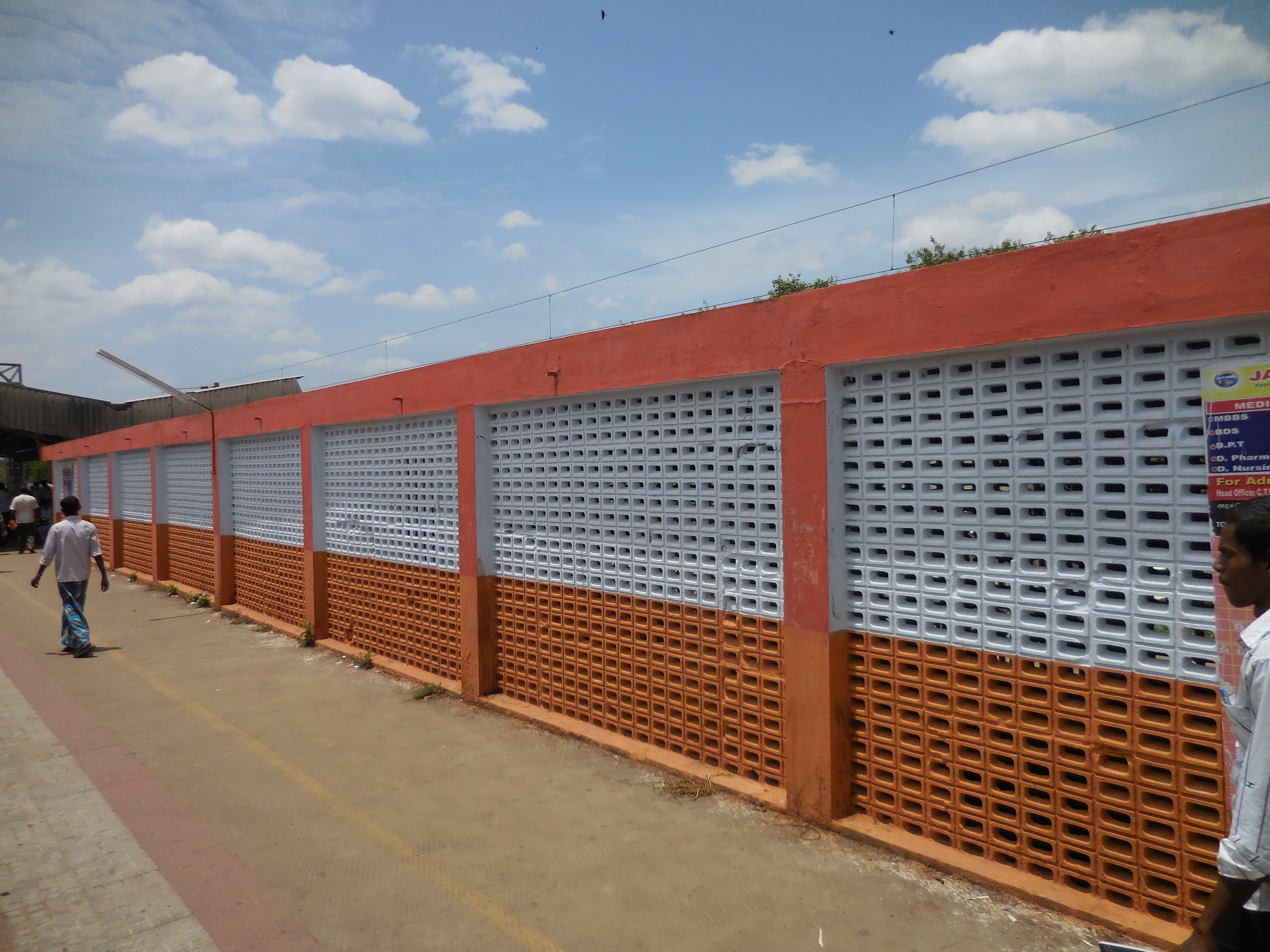
The subway at Vyasarpadi railway station

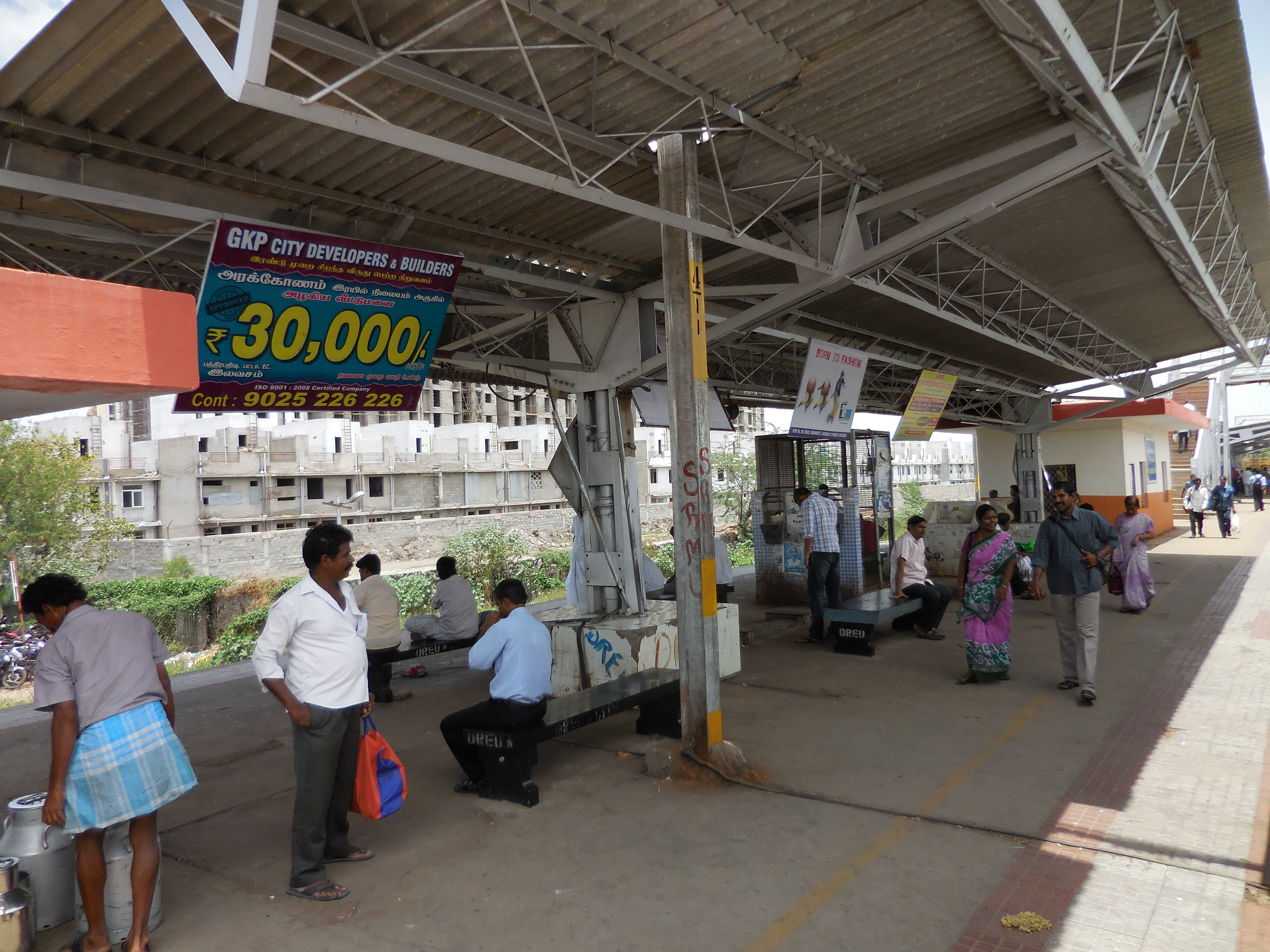
A view of the station towards west

The station is one of the oldest stations in South India. The first train to Arcot started from this station. The old ruins still remain 200 m away from the current station as a cabin room.

The lines at the station were electrified on 29 November 1979, with the electrification of the Chennai Central–Tiruvallur section. Additional line between Basin bridge and Vyasarpadi was electrified on 31 December 1985 and the doubling of track between Vyasarpadi and Korukkupet was electrified on 27 February 1986.

== The station ==
The station acts as the junction and four rail routes branch from here. The southern line goes to Chennai Central. The eastern line goes to Chennai Beach. The northern line goes to Korukupet further proceeding to Gudur. The western line goes to Perambur further proceeding to Arakkonam. The christening of this station is unique since Vyasarpadi is the name of the place and Jeeva is the name of veteran socialist leader Jeevanandam. It is in memory of his presence in Vyasarpadi, the station is named as 'Jeeva'.

== Facilities ==
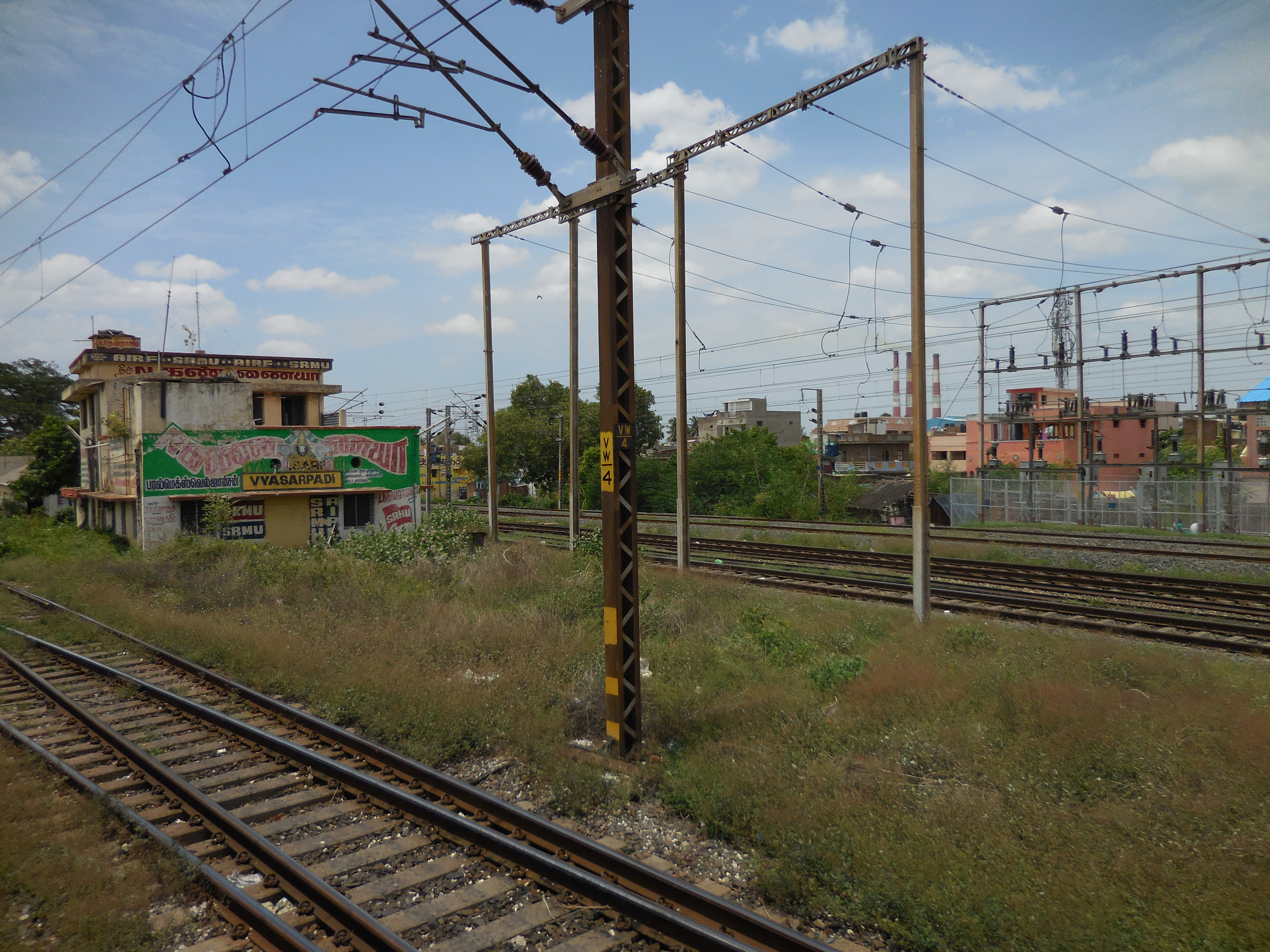
Vyasarpadi cabin, located at the eastern side of the station

Vyasarpadi Cabin is a control cabin located between Basin Bridge and Vyasarpadi Jeeva. Its function is to control the Vyasarpadi Jeeva station and railway lines connected to it.

The station is served by both a footbridge and a subway.

== Incidents ==
On 29 April 2009, a suburban EMU train from Chennai Central's Moore Market Suburban terminal, hijacked by an unidentified man, rammed with a stationary goods train at the Vyasarpadi Jeeva railway station, killing four passengers and injuring 11 others. A major portion of the platform at the station, foot over-bridge and railway track were damaged due to the impact of the collision. The train which was to start at 5:15 am started at 4:50 am. The speed of the EMU train at the time of the collision was 92 kmph. There were about 35 passengers on board the train at the time of the accident.

== See also ==
- Chennai Suburban Railway
- Railway stations in Chennai
