= Chennai–Tirupati MEMU =

Train in India

Chennai – Tirupati MEMU
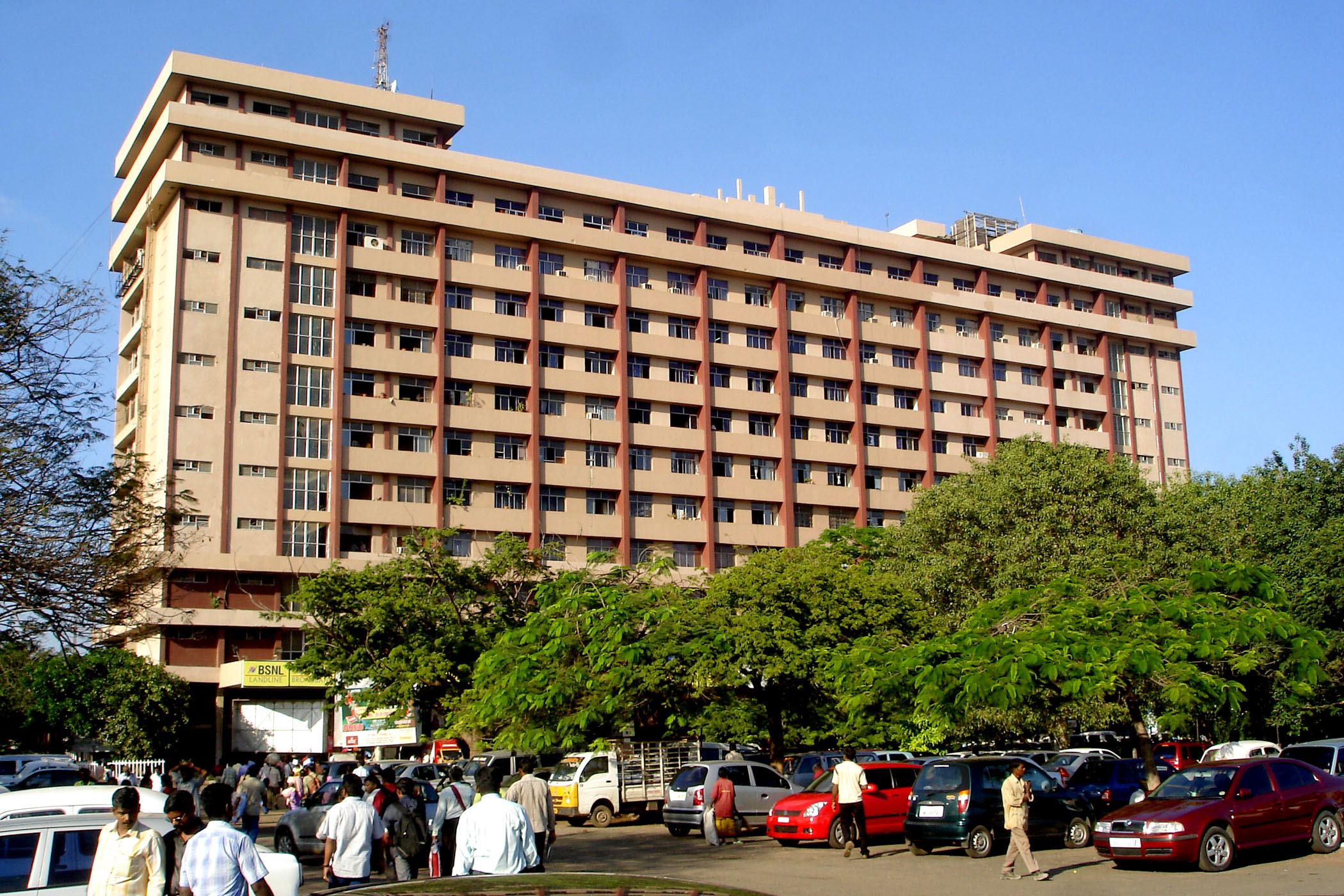
- Chennai Moore Market Station

Overview
- Service type: Passenger
- First service: 1 January 2010; 15 years ago
- Current operator: Southern Railway zone

Route
- Termini: Moore Market Complex (MMCC); Tirupati (TPTY)
- Stops: 25
- Distance travelled: 147 km (91 mi)
- Average journey time: 4h
- Service frequency: Daily (Note: Runs seven days in a week for every direction.)
- Train numbers: 66015/66014 (earlier), 06727/06728 (at present)

On-board services
- Class: General Unreserved
- Seating arrangements: No
- Sleeping arrangements: Yes
- Catering facilities: On-board catering E-catering
- Observation facilities: ICF coach
- Entertainment facilities: No
- Baggage facilities: No

Technical
- Rolling stock: 2
- Track gauge: 1,676 mm (5 ft 6 in)
- Operating speed: 37 km/h (23 mph), including halts

The Moore Market Complex–Tirupati MEMU is a MEMU passenger service belonging to Southern Railway zone that runs between Moore Market Complex and Tirupati in India. It was announced in 2013 rail budget.

== Service ==
The 66015/Moore Market Complex–Tirupati MEMU has an average speed of 37 km/h and covers 147 km in 4h. The 66014/Tirupati–Moore Market Complex MEMU has an average speed of 34 km/h and covers 147 km in 4h 15m. However after the CoVid pandemic, the train was re-introduced as a MEMU express special with train no 06727/06728 departing from MASS/TPTY respectively

== Route and halts ==
The important halts of the train are:

- Moore Market Complex
- Perambur
- Ambattur
- Avadi
- Arakkonam Junction
- Puttur
- Tiruchanur
- Tirupati

== Coach composition ==
The train uses either old generational MEMU which has 8 coaches or new generation MEMU (introduced by ICF ) which has 9 coaches out of which .6 are general coaches .3 are general ladies and first class coaches (it is 2 in the case of old gen MEMU)

== Direction reversal ==
The train reverses its direction 1 times:

- Renigunta Junction

== See also ==
- Tirupati railway station
- Moore Market Complex railway station
- Chennai Central–Tirupati Express
