= Pattabiram West railway station =

Railway station in Chennai, India

Pattabiram Military Siding
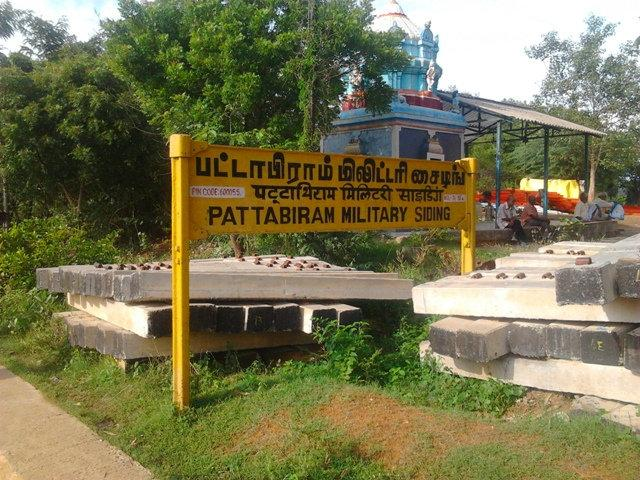
- Station sign board at PTMS

General information
- Location: Pattabiram, Chennai, Tamil Nadu 600 072, India
- Coordinates: 13°08′11.4″N 80°03′35.9″E
- System: Indian Railways and Chennai Suburban Railway station
- Owner: Ministry of Railways, Indian Railways
- Line: West line of Chennai Suburban Railway
- Platforms: 1
- Tracks: 1

Construction
- Structure type: Standard on-ground station

Other information
- Station code: PTMS
- Fare zone: Southern Railways

History
- Former names: South Indian Railway

Services
Preceding station	Chennai Suburban	Following station
Pattabiram East Depot Terminus	West Line	Pattabiram towards Chennai Central MMC or Chennai Beach
Route map
Chennai Central MMC — Jolarpet
Location

Pattabiram Military Siding railway station is one of the railway stations of the Chennai Central–Pattabiram East Depot (West Line Branch) section of the Chennai Suburban Railway Network. The station serves the neighbourhoods of Pattabiram and the Military Equipment Factories in Avadi in Thiruvallur district, Tamil Nadu. It has an elevation of 40 m above sea level.

== Station Layout ==
G	Street level	Exit/Entrance & ticket counter
P1	|Door will open on the left|
P1	Platform 1	Towards → Chennai central MMC / Chennai Beach Next Station: Pattabiram Military

== See also ==
- Chennai Suburban Railway
- Railway stations in Chennai
- Pattabiram east depot
- Pattabiram railway
