= Villivakkam railway station =

Railway station in Tamil Nadu, India

Villivakkam
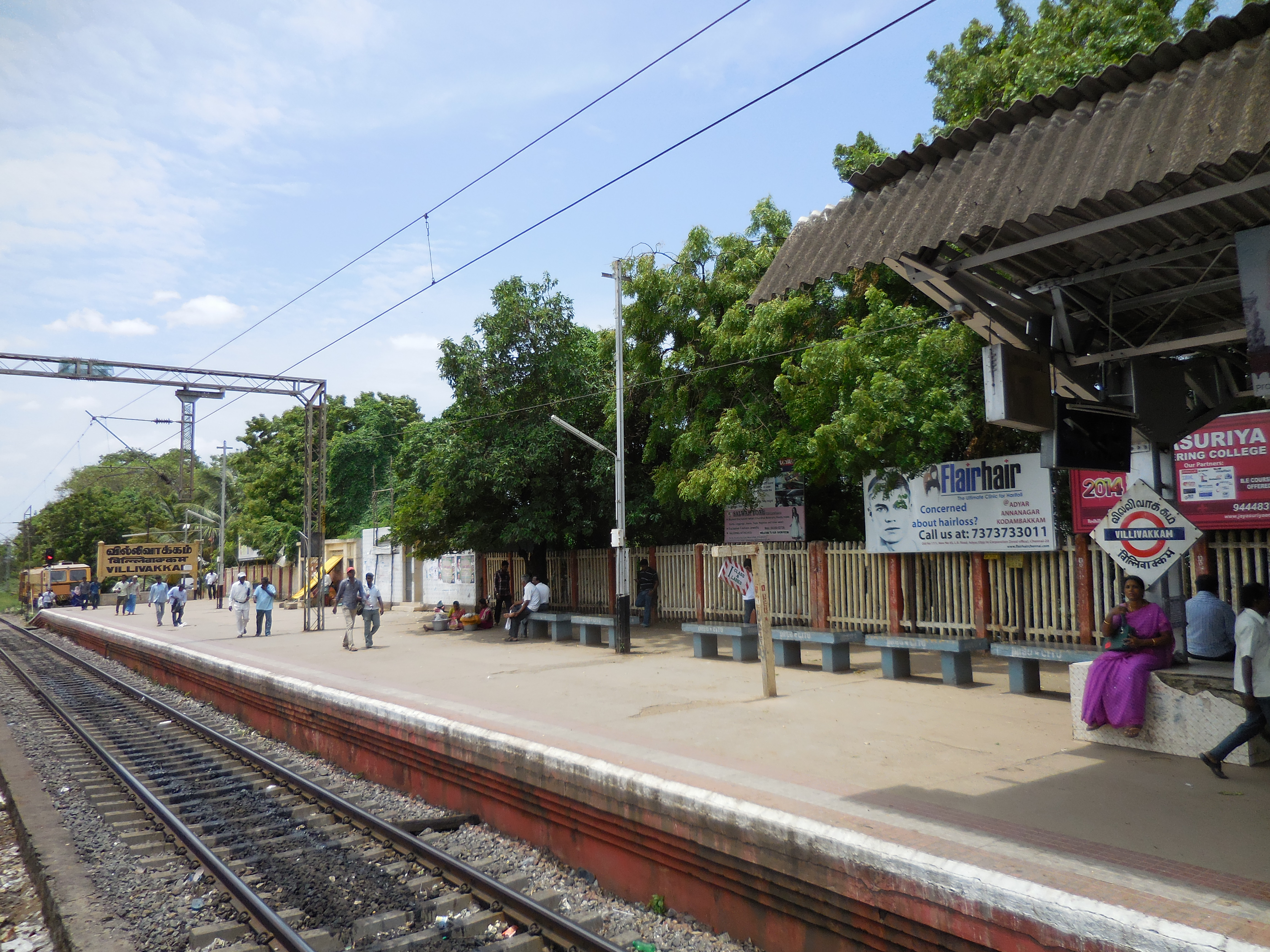
- Villivakkam railway station

General information
- Location: Villivakkam, Chennai, Tamil Nadu, India
- Coordinates: 13°6′37″N 80°12′33″E
- System: Indian Railways and Chennai Suburban Railway station
- Owner: Ministry of Railways, Indian Railways
- Lines: West, West North and West South lines of Chennai Suburban Railway
- Platforms: 4
- Tracks: 5
- Connections: Red Line Villivakkam

Construction
- Structure type: Standard on-ground station
- Parking: Available

Other information
- Station code: VLK
- Fare zone: Southern Railways

History
- Electrified: 29 November 1979
- Former names: South Indian Railway

Passengers
- 2013: 32,000/day

Services
| Preceding station | Chennai Suburban | Following station |
|---|---|---|
| Korattur towards Arakkonam Junction | West Line | Perambur Loco Works towards Chennai Central MMC |
Route map
Chennai Central MMC — Jolarpet
Location

Villivakkam railway station is a railway station on the Chennai Central–Arakkonam section of the Chennai Suburban Railway Network a city of Chennai in India. Located 9 km from Chennai Central railway station, the station serves the neighbourhood of Villivakkam, Kolathur and Padi. It has an elevation of 10.25 m above sea level.

== History ==
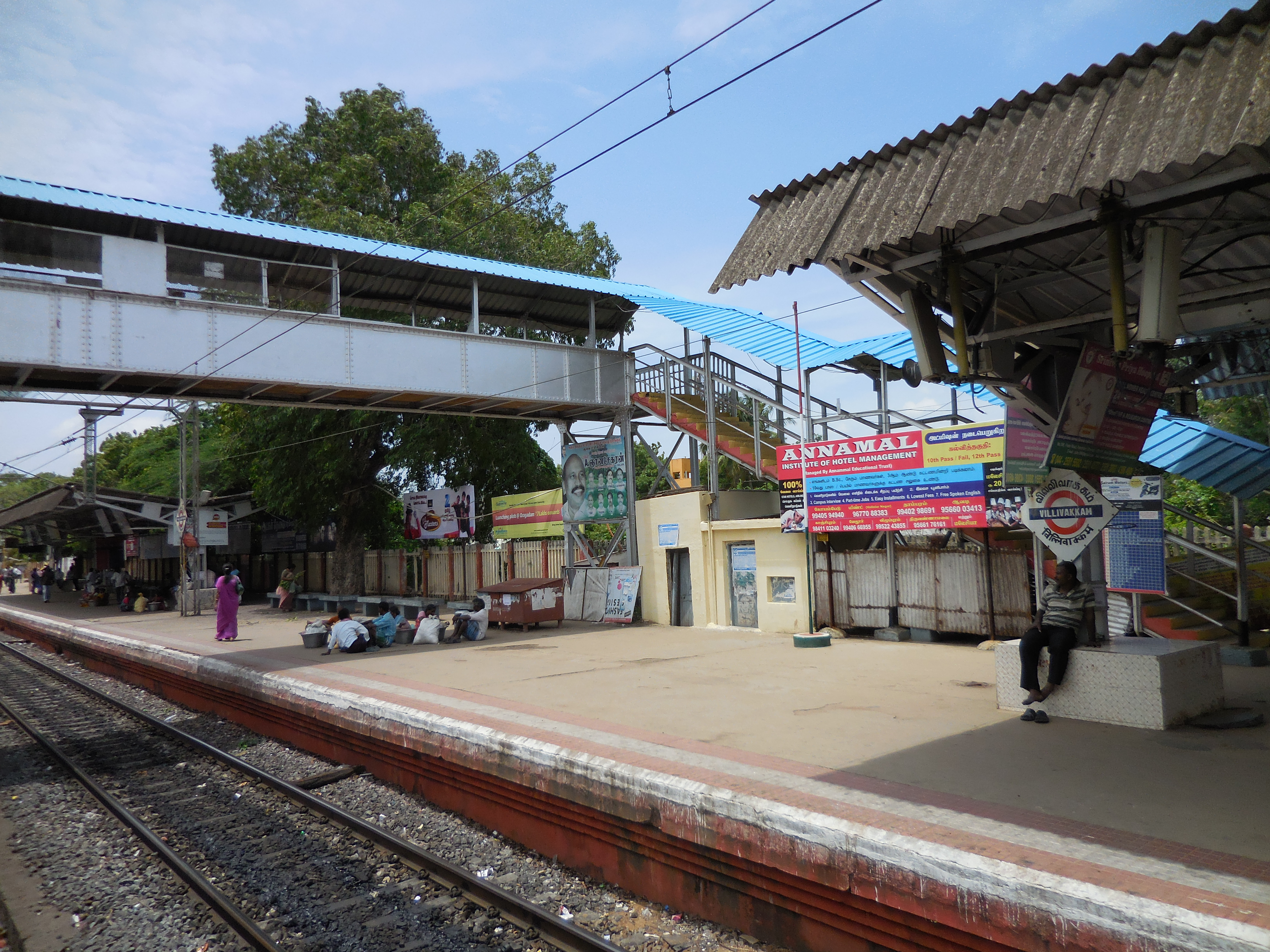
Footbridge at Villivakkam railway station

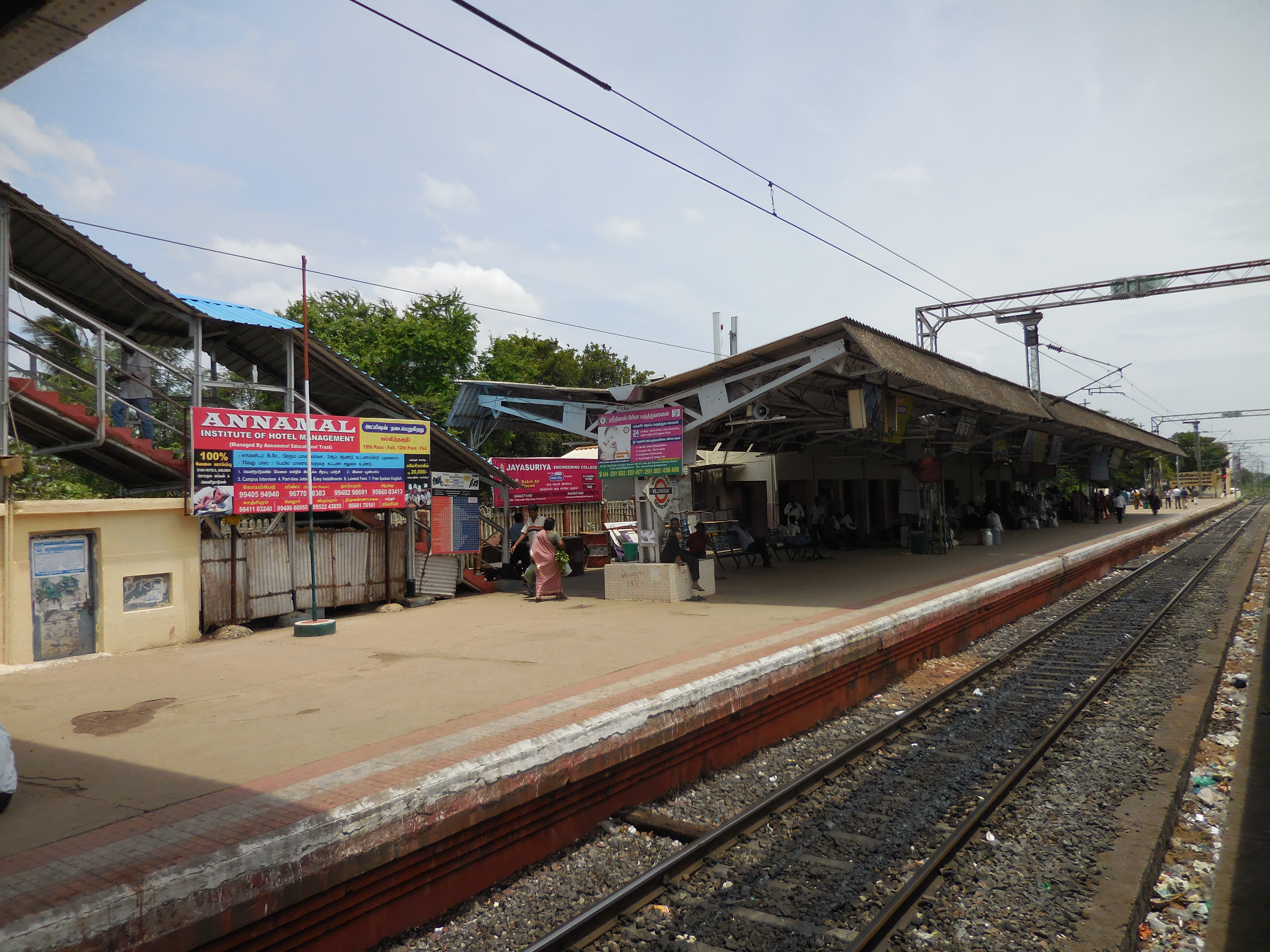
A view of the station towards west

The first lines in the station were electrified on 29 November 1979, with the electrification of the Chennai Central–Tiruvallur section. Additional lines at the station were electrified on 2 October 1986, with the electrification of the Villivakkam–Avadi section.

During the 2019 Chennai water crisis, this station was used to transfer water from trains into the city's water system.

== Facilities ==
The station has a foot overbridge for pedestrian, a level crossing and a vehicular subway. The vehicular subway, whose construction was started on 4 December 2007 and which replaced the previous level crossing 2 (LC2), was opened to traffic on 19 June 2012 and is located on the western side of the station. The 447.50-m-long subway linking north Villivakkam with south Villivakkam was built at a cost of ₹ 390 million, which also has a 2.5-m-wide bicycle lane. The level crossing 1 (LC1), located at the eastern side of the station (between Villivakkam and Perambur Loco Works stations), is being replaced with a 460-meter-long road overbridge being built at a cost of ₹ 590 million. The level crossing is located adjacent to the Integral Coach Factory (ICF) and connects several residential areas in both Villivakkam and Kolathur. The road overbridge will be 8.5 meters wide (with a carriageway of 7.5 meters) and will have 11 pillars. The bridge connects East Seeyalam Street with Villivakkam East Railway Crossing Road in Kumaran Nagar.

About 900 tickets are issued every day at the station, of which 400 are from the northern side. In 2002, a ticket counter was opened on the northern side. However, it was closed down in 2005 owing to low patronage.

== The station ==
=== Platforms ===
There are a total of 4 platforms and 4 tracks. The platforms are connected by foot overbridge. These platforms are built to accumulate 24 coaches express train.

=== Station layout ===
| G | North Entrance Street level | Exit/Entrance & ticket counter |
| P | FOB, Side platform | P4 – Express Lines |
| P | Platform 4 | Towards → MGR Chennai Central |
| P | Platform 3 | Towards ← Arakkonam Junction / Jolarpettai Junction |
| P | FOB, Island platform | P2 Doors will open on the left | P3 – Express Lines |
| P | Platform 2 | Towards → Chennai Central MMC next station is Perambur Loco Works |
| P | Platform 1 | Towards ← Arakkonam Junction next station is Korattur |
| P | FOB, Side platform | P1 Doors will open on the left |
| G | South Entrance Street level | Exit/Entrance & ticket counter |

== Demographics ==
The nearby Kolathur area has around 500,000 people residing in 54 colonies, and about 25,000 people are daily using the service of Chennai suburban railway trains. As of 2013, the station handles about 32,000 passengers a day.

== See also ==
- Chennai Suburban Railway
- Integral Coach Factory
- Regional Railway Museum
- Railway stations in Chennai
