= List of railway stations in Chennai =

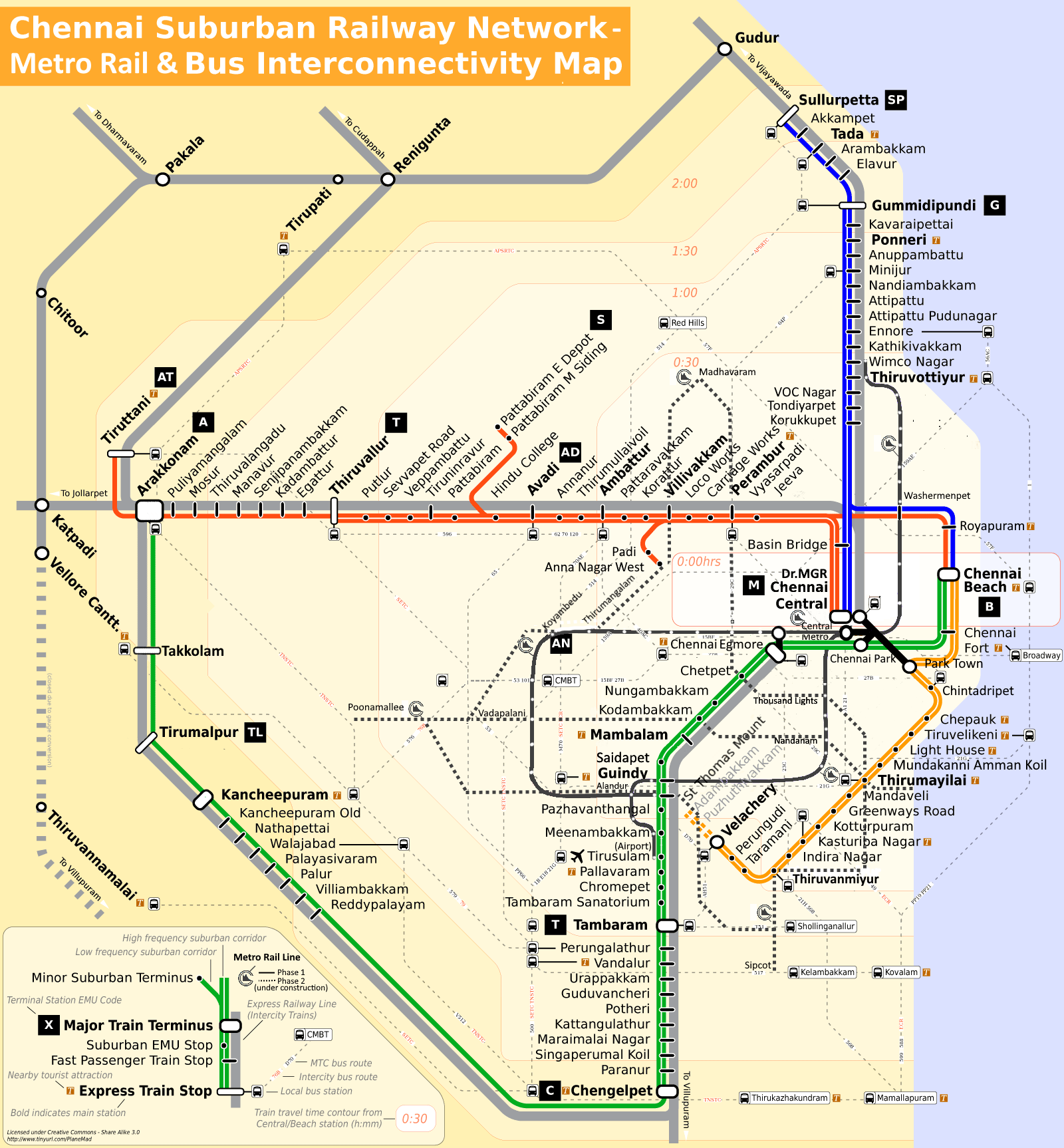
A railway map of the Chennai suburban train system including proposed new lines

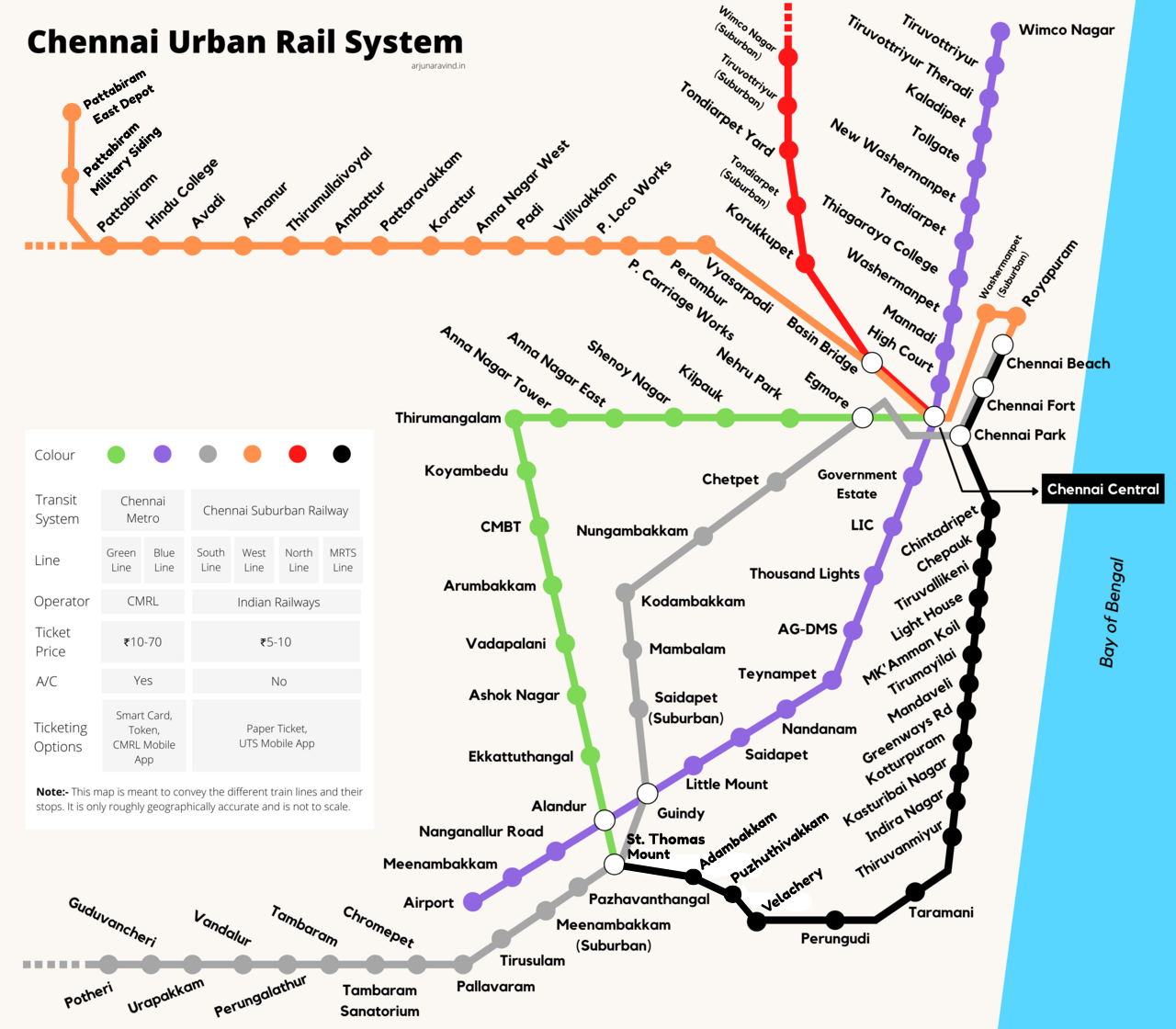
A graphical representation of the different public transit railway lines inside city limits in Chennai (including the Chennai Suburban Railway and the Chennai Metro) and their connections.

Chennai, the capital city of the state of Tamil Nadu, India, and the headquarters of the Southern Railway zone, is a major rail transport hub in the country. It has over 40 railway stations which are part of an extensive suburban railway network The city is served by three railway terminals – the Puratchi Thalaivar Dr. M.G. Ramachandran Central Railway Station and the Chennai Egmore railway station and the Tambaram railway station.

The first railway station to be built in Madras was the Royapuram station constructed in 1855 though the city had a railway line that dates back to the 1840s.

Fundamentally, Chennai has 4 suburban railway lines, namely North line, West line, South line and MRTS line. The South West line, West North line and West South line are merely minor extensions or modifications of the aforementioned suburban lines. The MRTS is a suburban railway line that chiefly runs on an elevated track exclusively used for running local EMUs or suburban local trains. No express trains or passenger trains run on MRTS line.

== List of railway stations in Chennai ==
The list includes those stations located within the Chennai Metropolitan Area. The Chennai Suburban Railway Network extends outside the metropolitan limits and are not included in the list, as are Chennai Metro stations.

List of railway stations in Chennai (Names in bold indicate that the station is also a regional hub)
#	Image	Station Name		Railway Station Code	District	Connections
#	Image	English	Tamil	Railway Station Code	District	Connections
1		Chennai Beach	சென்னை கடற்கரை	MSB	Chennai	North line West line South Line; MRTS Line
2		Puratchi Thalaivar Dr. M.G. Ramachandran Central Railway Station	புரட்சித் தலைவர் டாக்டர். எம்.ஜி. இராமச்சந்திரன் மத்திய ரயில் நிலையம்	MAS	Chennai	North Line; West Line
3		Moore Market Complex	மூர் சந்தை வளாகம்	MMC	Chennai	North line West Line
4		Royapuram	இராயபுரம்	RPM	Chennai	North Line; West Line
5		Basin Bridge	பேசின் பாலம் சந்திப்பு	BBQ	Chennai	North Line; West Line
6		Washermanpet	வண்ணாரப்பேட்டை	WST	Chennai	North Line; West Line
7		Chennai Fort	சென்னைக் கோட்டை	MSF	Chennai	South Line; MRTS Line
8		Chennai Park	சென்னைப் பூங்கா	MPK	Chennai	South Line
9		Chennai Egmore	சென்னை எழும்பூர்	MS	Chennai	North line West line South Line
10		Korukkupet	கொருக்குப்பேட்டை	KOK	Chennai	North Line
11		Tondiarpet	தண்டையார்பேட்டை	TNP	Chennai	North Line
12		V. O. C. Nagar	வ. உ. சி. நகர்	VOC	Chennai	North Line
13		Tiruvottiyur	திருவொற்றியூர்	TVT	Chennai	North Line
14		Wimco Nagar	விம்கோ நகர்	WCN	Chennai	North Line
15		Kathivakkam	கத்திவாக்கம்	KAVM	Chennai	North Line
16		Ennore	எண்ணூர்	ENR	Chennai	North Line
17		Athipattu Pudhunagar	அத்திப்பட்டு புதுநகர்	AIPP	Tiruvallur	North Line
18		Athipattu	அத்திப்பட்டு	AIP	Tiruvallur	North Line
19		Nandiambakkam	நந்தியம்பாக்கம்	NPKM	Tiruvallur	North Line
20		Minjur	மீஞ்சூர்	MJR	Tiruvallur	North Line
21		Vyasarpadi Jeeva	வியாசர்பாடி ஜீவா	VJM	Chennai	West Line
22		Perambur	பெரம்பூர்	PER	Chennai	West Line
23		Perambur Carriage Works	பெரம்பூர் பயணியர் ஊர்த்திப் பட்டரை	PCW	Chennai	West Line
24		Perambur Loco Works	பெரம்பூர் உந்துப் பொறி பட்டரை	PEW	Chennai	West Line
25		Villivakkam	வில்லிவாக்கம்	VLK	Chennai	West Line
26		Korattur	கொரட்டூர்	KOTR	Chennai	West Line
27		Pattaravakkam	பட்டரவாக்கம்	PVM	Chennai	West Line
28		Ambattur	அம்பத்தூர்	ABU	Chennai	West Line
29		Thirumullaivoyal	திருமுல்லைவாயில்	TMVL	Tiruvallur	West Line
30		Annanur	அண்ணனூர்	ANNR	Tiruvallur	West Line
31		Avadi	ஆவடி	AVD	Tiruvallur	West Line
32		Hindu College	இந்துக் கல்லூரி	HC	Tiruvallur	West Line
33		Pattabiram	பட்டாபிராம்	PAB	Tiruvallur	West Line
34		Pattabiram Military Siding	பட்டாபிராம் மிலிட்டரி சைடிங்	PTMS	Tiruvallur	West Line
35		Pattabiram East Depot	பட்டாபிராம் கிழக்கு டிப்போ	PRES	Tiruvallur	West Line
36		Nemilichery	நெமிலிச்சேரி	NEC	Tiruvallur	West Line
37		Thirunindravur	திருநின்றவூர்	TI	Tiruvallur	West Line
38		Chetput	சேத்துப்பட்டு	MSC	Chennai	South Line
39		Nungambakkam	நுங்கம்பாக்கம்	NBK	Chennai	South Line
40		Kodambakkam	கோடம்பாக்கம்	MKK	Chennai	South Line
41		Mambalam	மாம்பலம்	MBM	Chennai	South Line
42		Saidapet	சைதாப்பேட்டை	SP	Chennai	South Line
43		Guindy	கிண்டி	GDY	Chennai	South Line
44		St. Thomas Mount	பரங்கிமலை	STM	Chennai	South Line
45		Pazhavanthangal	பழவந்தாங்கல்	PZA	Chennai	South Line
46		Meenambakkam	மீனம்பாக்கம்	MN	Chennai	South Line
47		Tirusulam	திரிசூலம்	TLM	Chengalpattu	South Line
48		Pallavaram	பல்லாவரம்	PV	Chengalpattu	South Line
49		Chromepet	குரோம்பேட்டை	CMP	Chengalpattu	South Line
50		Tambaram Sanatorium	தாம்பரம் பிணிநீக்கு மையம்	TBMS	Chengalpattu	South Line
51		Tambaram	தாம்பரம்	TBM	Chengalpattu	South Line
52		Perungalathur	பெருங்களத்தூர்	PRGL	Chengalpattu	South Line
53		Vandalur	வண்டலூர்	VDR	Chengalpattu	South Line
54		Kilambakkam (under construction)	கிளாம்பாக்கம்		Chengalpattu	South Line
55		Chennai Park Town	பூங்கா நகர்	MPKT	Chennai	MRTS Line
56		Chintadripet	சிந்தாதிரிப்பேட்டை	MCPT	Chennai	MRTS Line
57		Chepauk	சேப்பாக்கம்	MCPK	Chennai	MRTS Line
58		Thiruvallikeni	திருவல்லிக்கேணி	MTCN	Chennai	MRTS Line
59		Light House	கலங்கரை விளக்கம்	MLHS	Chennai	MRTS Line
60		Mundagakanniamman Koil	முண்டகக்கண்ணியம்மன் கோவில்	MKAK	Chennai	MRTS Line
61		Thirumayilai	திருமயிலை	MTMY	Chennai	MRTS Line
62		Mandaveli	மந்தைவெளி	MNDY	Chennai	MRTS Line
63		Greenways Road	பசுமைவழிச் சாலை	GWYR	Chennai	MRTS Line
64		Kotturpuram	கோட்டூர்புரம்	KTPM	Chennai	MRTS Line
65		Kasturba Nagar	கஸ்தூரிபாய் நகர்	KTBR	Chennai	MRTS Line
66		Indira Nagar	இந்திரா நகர்	INDR	Chennai	MRTS Line
67		Thiruvanmiyur	திருவான்மியூர்	TYMR	Chennai	MRTS Line
68		Taramani	தரமணி	TRMN	Chennai	MRTS Line
69		Perungudi	பெருங்குடி	PRGD	Chennai	MRTS Line
70		Velachery	வேளச்சேரி	VLCY	Chennai	MRTS Line
71		Puzhuthivakkam	புழுதிவாக்கம்	PZV	Chennai	MRTS Line
72		Adambakkam	ஆதம்பாக்கம்	ABKM	Chennai	MRTS Line
73		Padi (Defunct since 2007)	பாடி		Chennai	West Line
74		Anna Nagar (Defunct since 2007)	அண்ணா நகர்		Chennai	West Line

== See also ==
- List of Chennai metro stations
- Chennai Suburban Railway
- Transport in Chennai
