= Thiruninravur railway station =

Railway station in Chennai, India

Thiruninravur

General information
- Location: Thiruninravur, Chennai, Tamil Nadu, India
- Coordinates: 13.123902°N 80.028054°E
- System: Indian Railways and Chennai Suburban Railway station
- Owner: Ministry of Railways, Indian Railways
- Lines: West, West North and West South lines of Chennai Suburban Railway
- Platforms: 4
- Tracks: 6

Construction
- Structure type: Standard on-ground station
- Parking: Available

Other information
- Station code: TI
- Fare zone: Southern Railways

History
- Electrified: 29 November 1979
- Former names: South Indian Railway

Passengers
- 20,000/day
Location
- Location within India Location within Tamil Nadu

Thiruninravur railway station is one of the railway stations on the Chennai Central–Arakkonam section of the Chennai Suburban Railway Network. It serves the neighbourhood of Thiruninravur, a suburb of Chennai, and is located 29 km west of the Chennai Central railway station. It has an elevation of 37 m above sea level.

== History ==
The lines at the station were electrified on 29 November 1979, with the electrification of the Chennai Central–Tiruvallur section.

Existing footbridge was demolished due to less usage and a new footbridge was erected in February 2016. In 2019, reservation counter was moved from the station platform to footbridge.

== Layout ==
The station has five platforms. Platform 1 is meant for long-distance trains, goods trains and trains starting from Thiruninravur. Platform 2 and 3 are meant for local suburban trains.Platform 4 is for fast suburban trains. Platform 5 under constructions.

== Traffic ==
The station has a footfall of more than 10,000 commuters every day.

== See also ==
- Chennai Suburban Railway
- Railway stations in Chennai
