= Senji =

Senji (Persian: سنجي) may refer to:

- Senji, South Khorasan, a village in South Khorasan, Iran
- Senji, Salmas, a village in Salmas County, West Azerbaijan, Iran
- Senji, Urmia, a village in Urmia County, West Azerbaijan, Iran
- Senji, Chennai, a village in western outskirts of Chennai, Tamil Nadu, India
- Senji, Villupuram, also known as Gingee, a town in Villupuram district, Tamil Nadu, India

== See also ==
- Sanji (disambiguation)
