= Sanji =

Sanji may refer to:

- Changji or Sanji, city in Xinjiang, China
- Sanji, Fujian, village in Nanping, Fujian, China
- Sanji (director), Sanji Senaka, an American music video director
- Sanji (given name), a masculine Japanese given name
- Sanji (One Piece), fictional character in the One Piece manga series

== See also ==
- Senji (disambiguation)
