= Panambakkam =

- suburb
- Location within Tamil Nadu Location within India
- Coordinates: 13.08661°N 79.83242°E
- Country: India
- State: Tamil Nadu
- District: Tiruvallur
- Taluk: Tiruvallur
- Metro: Chennai

Languages
  - Official: Tamil
- Time zone: UTC+5:30 (IST)
- PIN: 631203
- Telephone code: 044-2765
- Vehicle registration: TN-20-xxxx
- Lok Sabha constituency: Tiruvallur
- Vidhan Sabha constituency: Tiruvallur

Panambakkam is a village in western outskirts of Chennai located in Tiruvallur district in the Indian state of Tamil Nadu. Agriculture is the major occupation in this village.

== Connectivity ==
The village is in between Tiruvallur and Arakkonam, and the neighbourhood is served by the Senji Panambakkam railway station of the Chennai Suburban Railway Network.

The major transportation of Panambakkam is Railways. It is located in Chennai - Arakkonam suburban railway route. It is very close to Chennai central almost 90 mins travel. This village is connected with Chennai Central, Chennai Beach, Velachery, Perambur, Avadi, Ambattur, Tiruvallur, Arakkonam, Thiruthani by suburban trains.
