= Perambakkam =

- suburb
- Location within Tamil Nadu Location within India
- Coordinates: 13.0401°N 79.8171°E
- Country: India
- State: Tamil Nadu
- District: Tiruvallur
- Taluk: Tiruvallur
- Metro: Chennai
- Elevation: 102 m (335 ft)

Population (2011)
  - Total: 6,462

Languages
  - Official: Tamil
- Time zone: UTC+5:30 (IST)
- PIN: 631402
- Telephone code: 044-2765
- Vehicle registration: TN-20-xxxx
- Lok Sabha constituency: Tiruvallur
- Vidhan Sabha constituency: Tiruvallur

Perambakkam is a suburb of Chennai in Tiruvallur district in the Indian state of Tamil Nadu. It is a census town in Tiruvallur taluk. The town had a population of 6,462 in the 2011 Census of India, with educational provision including St.Marys matriculation higher secondary school, Om Sri Vivekananda Nursery & Primary School.

== Connectivity ==
The town lies between Poonamallee and Arakkonam, and the neighbourhood is served by the Kadambattur railway station of the Chennai Suburban Railway Network, 10 km from Perambakkam. Shared autos are frequently used to connect to the railway station. Perambakkam is also connected with the city by Metropolitan Transport Corporation buses and also connected to other neighbourhoods by moffusil buses.

== History ==
One of the Anglo-Mysore Wars, fought between Haider Ali and the British, was fought in the area on September 10, 1780. Haider Ali sent his son Fateh Ali Tipu (who later became Tipu Sultan) to fight against the British, led by General Sir Hector Munro in the Battle of Perambakkam. The result of the battle was decisive victory to Haider Ali.
