= Senji, Chennai =

Senji
- suburb
- Location within Tamil Nadu Location within India
- Coordinates: 13.06794°N 79.82051°E
- Country: India
- State: Tamil Nadu
- District: Tiruvallur
- Taluk: Tiruvallur
- Metro: Chennai

Languages
  - Official: Tamil
- Time zone: UTC+5:30 (IST)
- PIN: 631203
- Telephone code: 044-2765
- Vehicle registration: TN-20-xxxx
- Lok Sabha constituency: Tiruvallur
- Vidhan Sabha constituency: Tiruvallur

Senji is a village in western outskirts of Chennai, located in Tiruvallur district in the Indian state of Tamil Nadu.

== Transport ==
The village is between Tiruvallur and Arakkonam, and the neighbourhood is served by the Senji Panambakkam railway station of the Chennai Suburban Railway Network.

A major form of transportation for Senji is railways. It is located in Chennai-Arakkonam suburban railway route. This village is connected with Chennai Central, Chennai Beach, Velachery, Perambur, Avadi, Ambattur, Tiruvallur, Arakkonam, Thiruthani by suburban trains.

It is also connected to the city through MTC buses operated from Perambakkam, a town located south of Senji.
