= Sanji (given name) =

- Gender: Male

Origin
- Origin: Japanese
- Meaning: Different meanings depending on the kanji used

Sanji (written: 三次 or さん治) is a masculine Japanese given name. Notable people with the name include:

- Sanji Abe (阿部 三次; 1895–1982), American politician
- Sanji Hase (はせ さん治; 1936–2002), stage name of Hirō Hase, Japanese voice actor
- Sanji Inoue (井上 三次; born 1948), Japanese cyclist
- Sanji Iwabuchi (岩淵 三次; 1895–1945), Imperial Japanese Navy admiral

== Fictional characters ==
- Sanji (One Piece) (サンジ), a character in the manga series One Piece
