= Pattabiram East Depot railway station =

Railway station in Chennai, India

Pattabiram Military Siding E Depot
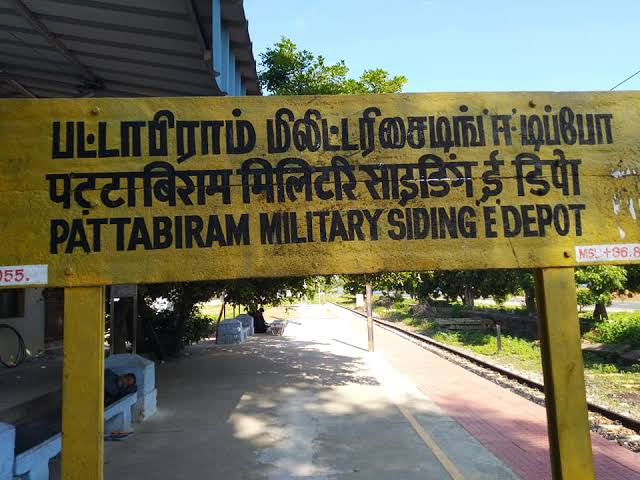
- Station sign board at PRES

General information
- Location: Pattabiram, Avadi IAF, Chennai, Tamil Nadu 600055, India
- Coordinates: 13.146018°N 80.06863°E
- System: Station of Chennai Suburban Railway and Southern Railways
- Owner: Ministry of Railways, Indian Railways
- Line: West line of Chennai Suburban Railway
- Platforms: 1
- Tracks: 1
- Connections: MTC

Construction
- Structure type: Standard on-ground station
- Parking: Available

Other information
- Station code: PRES
- Fare zone: Southern Railways

History
- Former names: South Indian Railway

Services
| Preceding station | Chennai Suburban | Following station |
|---|---|---|
| Terminus | West Line | Pattabiram West towards Chennai Central MMC or Chennai Beach |
Route map
Chennai Central MMC — Jolarpet
Location

Pattabiram Military Siding E-Depot (East) Railway station is one of the railway stations of the Chennai Central–Arakkonam section of the Chennai Suburban Railway Network. The station code is PRES.

The station serves the neighbourhood of Pattabiram, Avadi IAF in western Chennai. It has an elevation of 40 m above sea level.

== See also ==
- Chennai Suburban Railway
- Railway stations in Chennai
