= Manavur =

Historical village of near Chennai, Tamil Nadu, India

The historical village of Manavur lay 54 kilometers from Chennai on the Central-Arakkonam rail route. This village dates back to as early as the 7th century. Historical facts reveal that Kurumbas ruled the ancient Thondai Mandalam by dividing it into 24 divisions of which Manavur was the 4th division.

True to its legacy, this small village boasts several inscriptions and sculptures found in the sanctum sanctorum of 1200 years old Thirunandeeswarar, Karkadakeswarar, Kandhaswami and Vinayagar temples. The sculptures as well as architectural design of this temple depict typical Chola construction.

== Sri Anandavalli Sametha Thirunandeeswarar Temple ==
The temple houses Thirunandeeswarar as moolavar. In the northern side, resides Goddess Anandavalli Thayar. Outer pragaras host Ganapathy, Subramaniar and Bairavar as kshetrabalagar. Around the sanctum sanctorum the idols of Lord Dakshinamoorthy, Lingothbavar, Brahma and Durgai had been installed.

It is said that Lord Shiva after his celestial dance performance in Thiruvalangadu gave darshan to Agasthiar in Thirumanakolam along with His consort Anandavalli, hence the village came to be known as Manavur. Nandhi Baghavan and Sage Agasthiar had worshipped here. Inscriptions found in Koovam and Thakkolam temples talk about the glory of this temple. The temples in Manavur were built with perfect alignment as mentioned in the aagama sastras (Karshanathi, Prathishtandham, Prathishtandhi, Uthsavandham and Uthsavandhi).

Shiva temple was built in Eashanya, Vijayaraghava Perumal temple in Niruthi moola; Sakthi Ganapthi temple facing north and Kandhaswami temple facing east have been consecrated. A unique urchava moorthi statue of Sri Kannapa Nayanar, who donated his eye to Lord Shiva, relates his connection to this temple.

Legend has it that Nandhi Baghavan, initiated a sacred water source, which is now serving as the temple tank, took a holy dip in the temple pond, worshipped Lord Shiva and got his curse lifted. Hence the temple tank has the name Nandi theertham and the Lord is called Thirunandeeswarar. It is also believed that Ganga Devi who was captivated in Lord Shiva's siras is the source of water flow to this temple tank. Lord Shiva, after his celestial dance which Karaikal Ammaiyar witnessed, came to Manavur and gave darshan to Sage Agasthiar with his consort.

It is believed that Lord Shiva danced in Thiruvalangadu, rested in Thiruvooral (now known as Thakkolam) and married Parvathi at Manavur.

It is also being said that when this temple was well maintained, the doors of this temple even when closed one could hear the bell-toll as far as Chidambaram, only after which the Chidambaram temple will be closed. Also, during the Moghul invasion, the villagers, in a measure to save such beautiful doors, said to have hidden these doors, by throwing it in the village pond.

Present state of the temple

Thirunandeeswarar temple was in a dilapidated state and it is renovated. In an effort to restore the original glory and to uphold the falling majesty the local villagers worked without pay and restored part of this historic temple. However, there are other tasks that require specific expertise, which is directly proportional to the cost involved.
