= Pattabiram =

Neighbourhood in Tiruvallur district, Tamil Nadu, India

Pattabiram, Chennai
- suburb of Chennai
- Location within Chennai Location within Tamil Nadu Location within India
- Coordinates: 13.1236°N 80.06°E
- Country: India
- State: Tamil Nadu
- District: Tiruvallur
- Taluk: Avadi
- Metro: Chennai
- MLA Constituency: Avadi
- MP Constituency: Tiruvallur

Government
  - Type: Municipal Corporation
  - Body: Avadi Municipal Corporation

Languages
  - Official: Tamil
- Time zone: UTC+5:30 (IST)
- PIN: 600072
- Vehicle registration: TN-12

Pattabiram is a neighbourhood situated on the western part of Chennai, India. The suburb, which falls under Avadi Municipal Corporation, is about 25 km from the Chennai Central railway station. It is an immediate neighbour of Chennai city proper, and a part of the Chennai Metropolitan Region.

== IT Parks ==
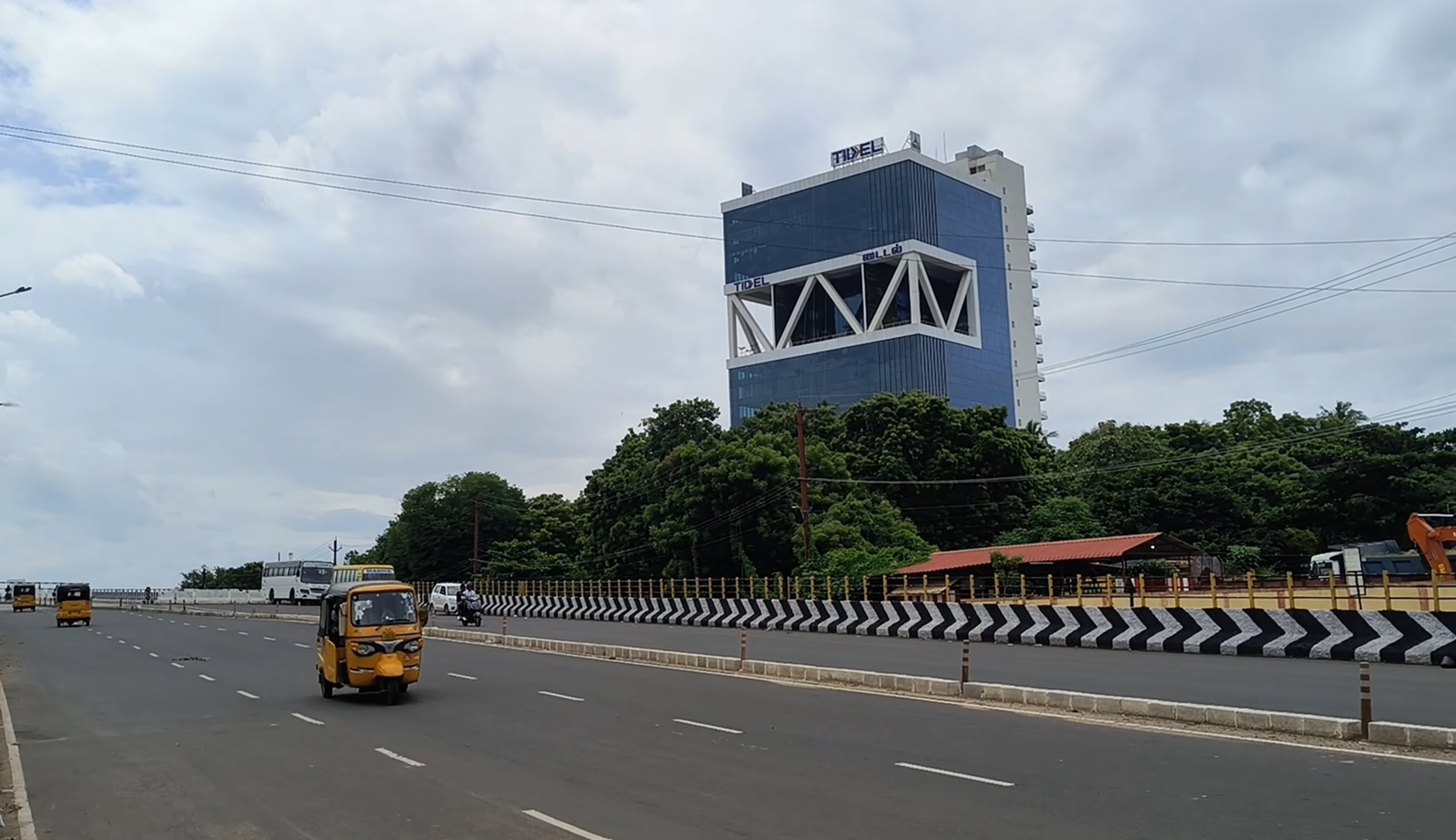
TIDEL Park, Pattabiram view from CTH Road

One of the Pattabiram's major industries is, now defunct, Southern Structural Limited, a factory which produced pressure vessels, steel fabrication, and container-handling cranes. Opened in 1958, the company was owned by Tamil Nadu Govt, with a total of 850 employees. Currently, Govt of Tamil Nadu has planned to build its third Tidel Park in this place. This project includes a five-star hotel, convention centre and residential flats apart from the IT park. Owned by the state government, the 45 acres of land is on the Chennai-Tiruvallur road and within easy access of suburban railway line and arterial roads, said government officials. With the state allotting 10 acres for the Tidel Park, the 21-storied building will be 60 meters tall and will have hanging gardens between the 15th and 19th floors. Large murals are planned in the main lobby and a gym and indoor games will come up on the 12th floor. The complex will also have a huge food court in a separate block. The building will have office spaces measuring 495,000 square feet, with about 50 companies in the IT/ITES sector. Office spaces will range from 300 square feet to 25,000 square feet. Work is expected to begin by January 2020 and will be completed in two years.

== Transport ==
=== Railways ===
Pattabiram is served by suburban trains, which connects it to different parts of Chennai City, especially Chennai Central and Chennai Beach Railway stations. All trains bound for Thirvallur, Arakkonam and Pattabiram Military Siding stop at Pattabiram Railway station, with the exception of a few fast trains.

All normal EMU trains bound to Thiruvallur, Arakkonam, Kadambathur, Thiruvalangadu and Tiruttani starting from Chennai Central and Chennai Beach halt at Pattabiram. Separate station is for Pattabiram Military Siding - PTMS situated at the north side of Pattabiram railway station.

=== By road ===
The suburb is also served by a number of Chennai Metropolitan buses from different parts of the city and surrounding suburban areas. On 4 October 2013, the Tamil Nadu Highways department issued a GO extending the entire stretch of the road till Thirunindravur–Padi to 6 lanes at a cost of ₹ 1,680 million, by means of land acquisition from 12 villages. In the first phase, the road will be widened to 100 ft (4 lanes) with center median at a cost of ₹ 980 million.

Pattabiram has a bus terminus and is served by the Metropolitan Transport Corporation buses.

=== Metro Rail ===
The Red line of Chennai Metro will be extended from Koyambedu to Pattabiram, based on the Detailed Project Report prepared by CMRL and approved by Government of Tamil Nadu, with land surveys currently in progress. The corridor will also have a Metro rail Depot near Outer Ring Road passing through the area.

== Educational institutions ==
Among the major institutions in Pattabiram is the Hindu college affiliated to the University of Madras. Infant Jesus, Thangamani schools started in early 1970’s brought in English medium education in this region. Sri Ramakrishna School-which made a huge educational service in this region was appreciated my former Members of that constituency. There are also quite a few Engineering and arts colleges within the vicinity, including A.M.S College of Engineering, Jaya Engineering College, Shakthi Engineering College and Jaya College of Arts and Science.

=== Schools ===
1. Jaya Matric.Hr.Sec.School
2. Sri Ramakrishna Matric. Hr. Sec. School
3. Sri Ramakrishna School
4. Govt. School, Thandurai
5. Govt. School, Uzhaipalar Nagar
6. Govt. School, Cholan Nagar
7. Govt. School, Modern City
8. Thangamani Matric.Hr.Sec.School
9. Good Shepherd Matric.Hr.Sec.School
10. Infant Jesus Nursery And Primary School
11. Holy Infant Jesus Matric.Hr.Sec.School
12. Immanuvel Matric.Hr.Sec.School
13. Bharathi Matric School.
14. Govt. School, Chatiram

=== Colleges ===
1. Hindu College
2. AMS Engineering College
3. AMS Polytechnic College
4. Sarvodhaya ITI
5. Vinayaka ITI

== See also ==
- Chennai
- Chennai Metropolitan Area
