= Arakkonam Junction railway station =

Railway Station in Ranipet District, Tamil Nadu, India

Arakkonam Junction Arakkonam Junction
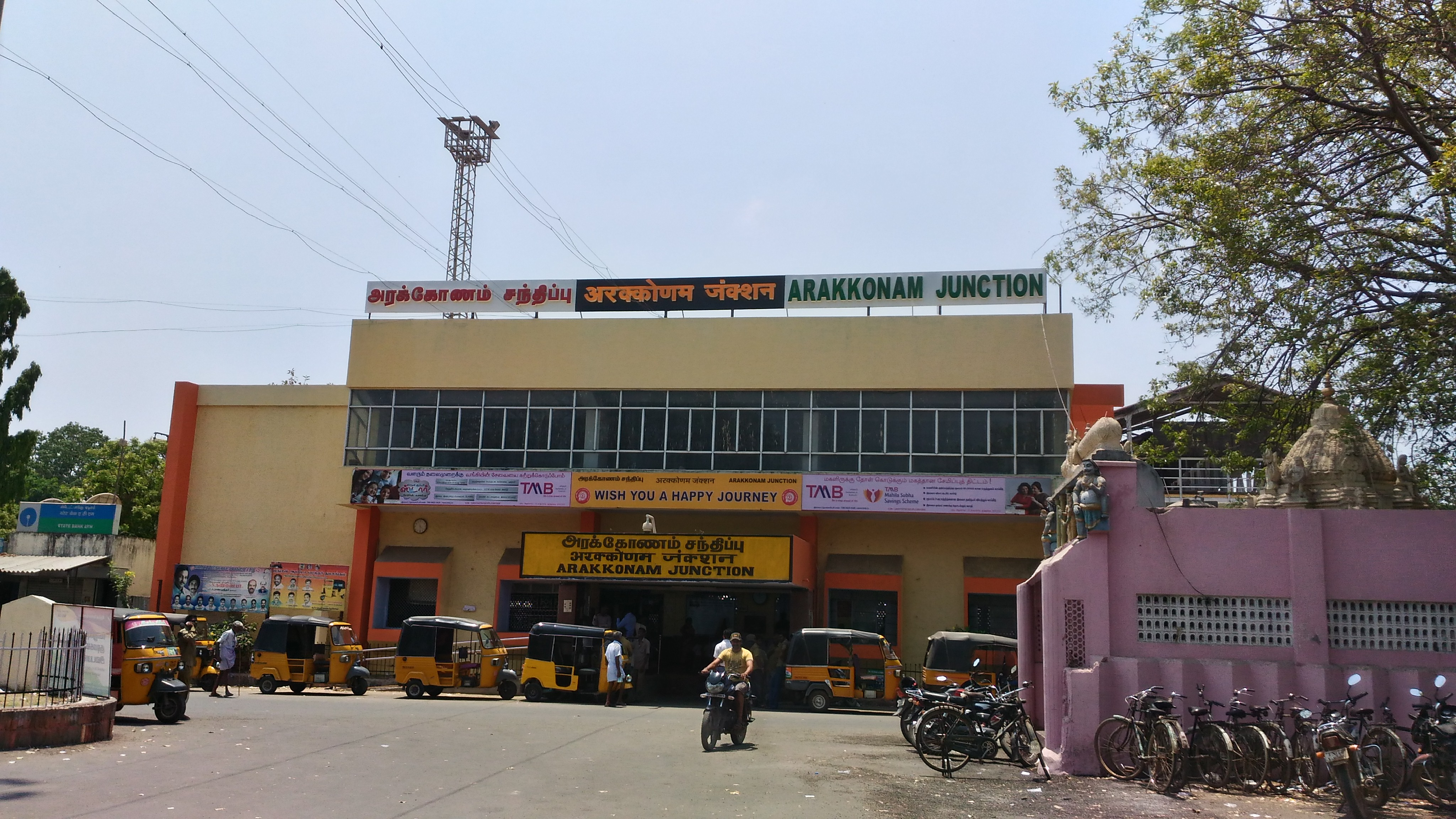
- Arakkonam Junction Railway Station

General information
- Location: No 4, RSK Complex, Good's Shed Road, PJN 1st Cross Line, Arakkonam; Ranipet district,Tamil Nadu, 631001; India
- Coordinates: 13°04′55″N 79°40′06″E
- Elevation: 85 m (279 ft)
- System: Indian Railways and Chennai Suburban Railway station
- Owner: Ministry of Railways (India)
- Operator: Indian Railways
- Lines: Mumbai–Chennai line; Chennai Central–Bangalore City line; Arakkonam - Chennai Central MMC
- Distance: 68 km (42 mi) from Chennai Central; 62 km (39 mi) from Katpadi Junction
- Platforms: 8 Side platforms
- Tracks: 12
- Connections: TAMILNADU STATE GOVERNMENT BUSES, TAXIS, METRO (BUT TOO DISTANT )

Construction
- Structure type: At-grade
- Depth: 3,500 m (11,500 ft)
- Platform levels: 2
- Parking: Available
- Cycle facilities: Yes
- Accessible: Yes
- Architect: INDIAN

Other information
- Status: Operational
- Station code: AJJ
- Zone(s): Southern Railway
- Division(s): Chennai
- Classification: Non-suburban 2 (NSG 2)

History
- Opening: 1848
- Rebuilt: --
- Electrified: 1982-83
- Former names: ARAKKONAM JOINT JUNCTION

Passengers
- 2011–15: 71,865 (Avg. per day)
- Rank: 4TH IN DIVISION, 120TH IN ZONE

Services
Preceding station	Indian Railways	Following station
Chitteri towards Jolarpettai Junction or Bangalore City	Chennai Central–Bangalore City line	Puliyamangalam towards Chennai Central
Renigunta Junction towards Renigunta Junction, Guntakal Junction or Mumbai CSMT	Mumbai–Chennai line	Perambur towards Chennai Central
Preceding station	Chennai Suburban	Following station
Terminus	West Line	Puliyamangalam towards Chennai Central MMC
Route map
Location
- Location within Tamil Nadu Location within India

Arakkonam Junction railway station (station code: AJJ) is an NSG–2 category Indian railway station in Chennai railway division of Southern Railway zone. It is located in Ranipet district of Tamil Nadu. It is one of the oldest railway stations in India, located on the first railway line in South India. It is located on the Guntakal–Chennai Egmore section of Mumbai–Chennai line.

== Lines from Arakkonam Junction ==
Towards	Passing Through Station	Type / Track
Katpadi Junction	Arakkonam Junction	Broad Gauge, Electrified – Double Track
Renigunta Junction	Arakkonam Junction	Broad Gauge, Electrified – Double Track
M.G.R Chennai Central	Arakkonam Junction	Broad Gauge, Electrified – Quadruple Track
Chengalpattu Junction	Arakkonam Junction	Broad Gauge, Electrified – Single Track

== Routes having quadruple tracks ==
- The South Line, Chennai Suburban between Chennai Beach and Chengalpattu.
- The West Line, Chennai Suburban between Chennai Central and Arakkonam Junction

== Projects and development ==
It is one of the 73 stations in Tamil Nadu to be named for upgradation under Amrit Bharat Station Scheme of Indian Railways.

== Loco shed ==
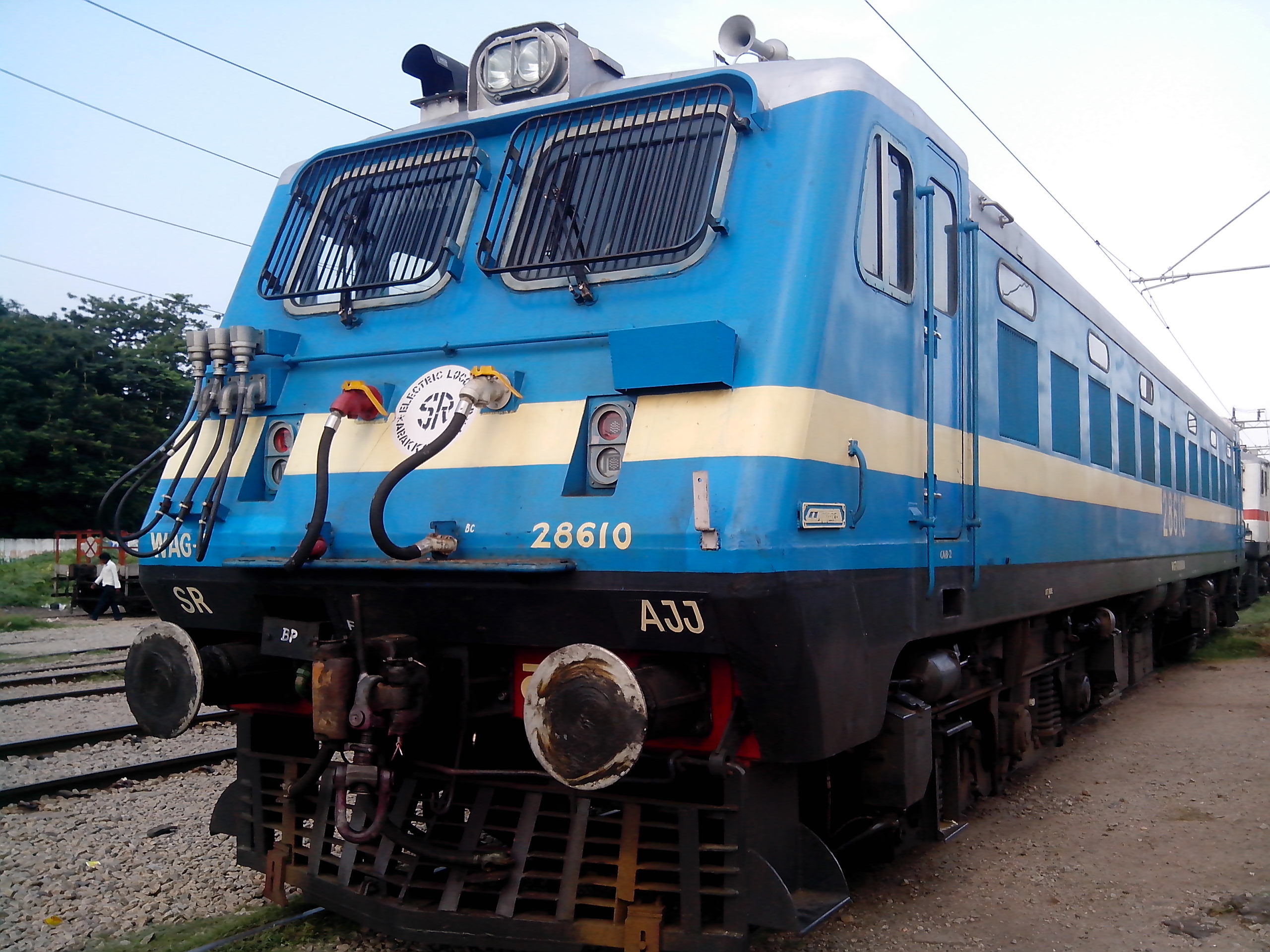
ELS AJJ WAG-7

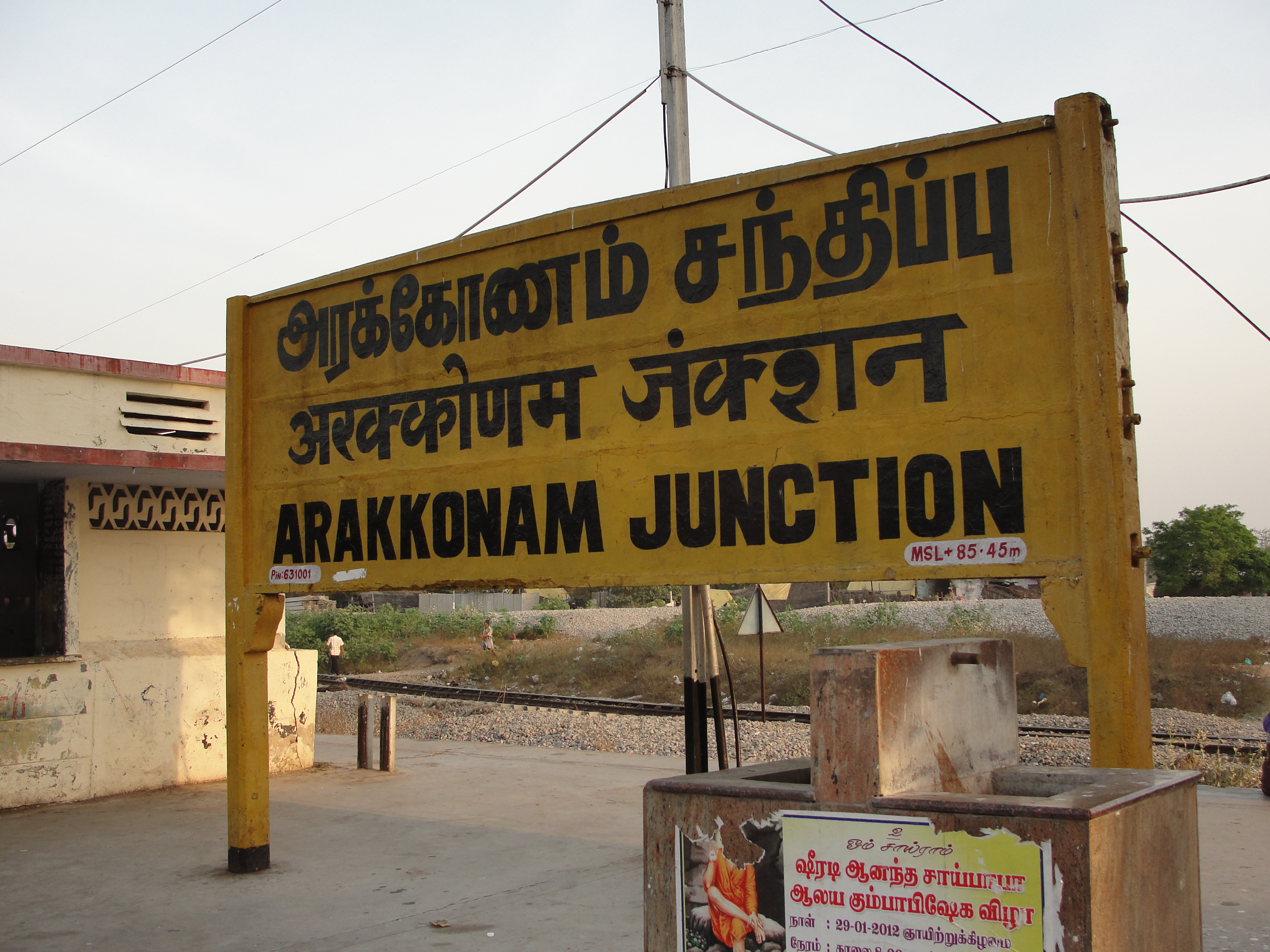
Station board

Electric Loco Shed, Arakkonam is a motive power depot performing locomotive maintenance and repair facility for electric locomotives of the Southern Railway zone in Tamil Nadu, India. It is one of the three electric locomotive sheds of the Southern Railway, the others being at Erode (ED) and Royapuram (RPM) and is the oldest in south India. As of 1 November 2020 there are 184 locomotives in the shed mainly WAP-4, WAG-5 HA and WAG-9H 184 locos near the station. It is also one of the last sheds to home the hugely successful WAM-4 class locomotives.The Indian Railway Provided A Wap 5 In Amrit Bharath Express Livery With Effect From May Month

== See also ==
- Chennai Suburban Railway
