= West North Line, Chennai Suburban =

West-North Line

Overview
- Status: Operational
- Termini: Chennai Central (Madras Central); Tirupati
- Stations: 40

Service
- Type: Suburban railway
- System: Chennai Suburban Railway
- Operator: Southern Railway (India)
- Depot: Avadi

Technical
- Line length: 151 km (82 km Suburban and 69 km MEMU)
- Track length: 412 kilometres (256 mi)
- Number of tracks: 4 (till Arakkonam) 2 (till Tirupati (city))
- Track gauge: Broad Gauge
- Operating speed: 90 km/h (maximum service speed)

The North west Line of Chennai Suburban Railway is the fifth longest line that runs west–north from Chennai City. Suburban services terminate at Tiruttani and MEMU services run till Tirupati, across the state line in Andhra Pradesh.

== Sections ==
=== Chennai Central MMC - Tiruvallur ===
- This section has 2 dedicated lines for suburban train operations apart from 2 main lines for mixed traffic.
- EMUs are operated along 3rd and 4th main lines during peak hours.
- 5th and 6th rail lines are planned.
- 12-car EMU are operated in this sector.

=== Thiruvallur - Arakkonam ===
- Suburban trains operate in the 2 main lines.
- 3rd rail line and 4th rail line is completed .
- 12-car EMU are operated in this sector.

=== Arakkonam - Tiruttani ===
- Suburban trains operate in the 2 main lines.

=== Chennai Central MMC - Tirupati ===
- MEMU trains operate between Chennai Central and Tirupati.
