= Moore Market Complex railway station =

Railway station in Chennai

Moore Market Complex Chennai Suburban Terminal Chennai Puranagar Munaiyam
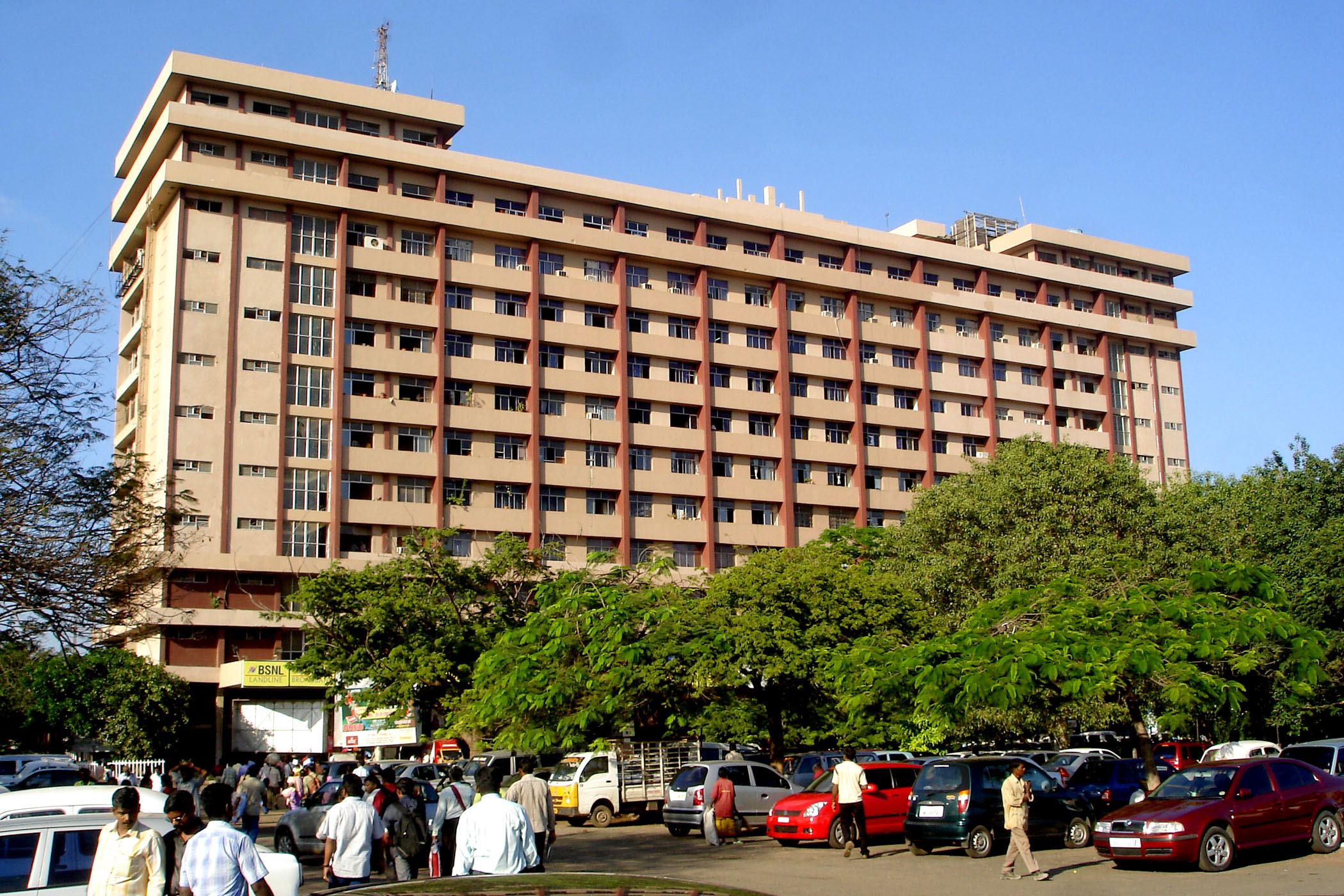
- Moore Market Complex

General information
- Other names: Chennai Central Suburban
- Location: Park Town, Chennai, Tamil Nadu, India
- System: Chennai Suburban Railway
- Owner: Ministry of Railways, Indian Railways
- Lines: North Line; West Line; West North Line; West South Line
- Platforms: 5
- Tracks: 5

Construction
- Structure type: At level
- Parking: Available
- Accessible: Chennai Central

Other information
- Status: Active
- Station code: MASS
- Fare zone: Southern Railways

Passengers
- 2013: 200,000/day

Services
1000/day (2023)
Location
- Location within Chennai

The Moore Market Complex, or the Chennai Suburban Terminal, (station code: MASS), is a railway terminus in the Chennai Suburban Railway system. It is located next to the Chennai Central railway station in Park Town, Chennai. The station was built in 1986 on the space occupied by the Moore Market complex, which was destroyed in a fire in 1985.

The station serves as the hub for suburban trains on the North, West, West North, and West South lines of the Chennai suburban rail network. As of 2023, the station has five platforms, numbered from 12 to 16, to be continuous with platforms in the Chennai Central, and caters to about 1000 train services daily.

== History ==
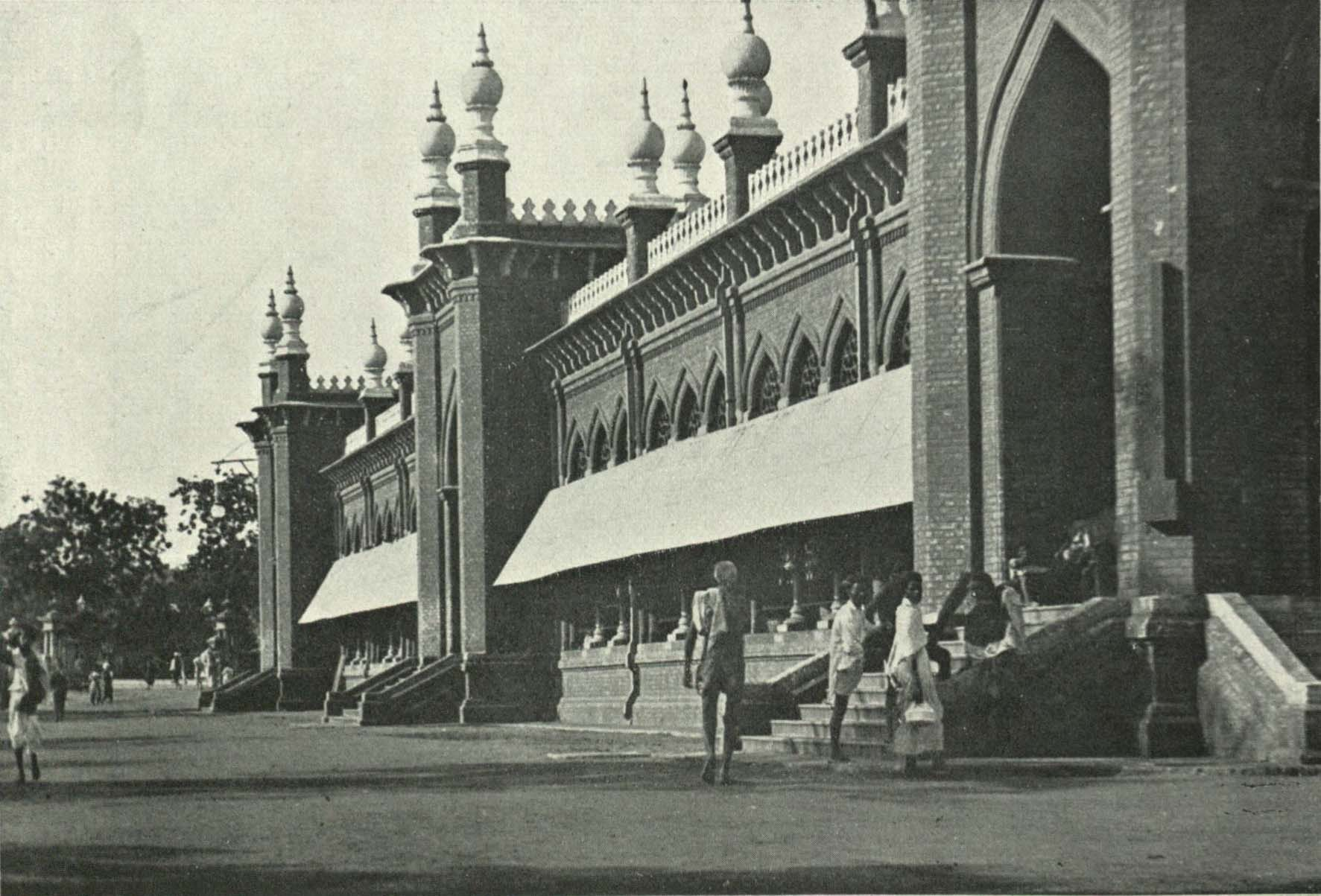
The Moore Market, c. 1905

Moore Market was originally built to house the hawkers in the Broadway area of Madras. The building, designed in the Indo-Saracenic style by R. E. Ellis, was constructed by A. Subramania Aiyar, and completed in 1900. It had various shops located around a central square, which developed into a flea market over the years.

In the 1980s, the Indian Railways started looking for land for the expansion of the nearby Chennai Central railway station. On 30 May 1985, the Moore Market building was destroyed due to a fire whose cause was undetermined. The state government transferred the land to the Railways, and the structure was later razed to make way for the new Chennai Suburban Railway terminus. The 13-storied Moore Market Complex opened in 1986 and houses the suburban terminus, railway reservation counters, and other offices.
