= West South Line, Chennai Suburban =

West-South Line

Overview
- Status: Operational till Villupuram
- Owner: Southern railway
- Termini: Chennai Beach (Madras Beach); Villupuram
- Stations: 61

Service
- Type: Suburban railway
- System: Chennai Suburban Railway
- Operator: Southern Railway (India)
- Depot: Avadi

Technical
- Line length: 289.5 kilometres (179.9 mi) (69 km Suburban, 140 km MEMU and 81 km u/c)
- Number of tracks: 4 till Arakkonam, 2 till Katpadi,1 till Villupuram
- Track gauge: Broad gauge
- Electrification: 25
- Operating speed: 90 km/h (maximum service speed)

The South West Frontier line of Chennai Suburban Railway is the longest line running South-west from Chennai (Madras) City covering a distance of almost 289 km. Suburban services terminate at Arakkonam and MEMU services run till Villupuram Junction.

== Chennai Central - Thiruvallur ==
- This section has 2 dedicated lines for suburban train operations apart from 2 main line for mixed traffic.
- EMUs are operated along 3rd and 4th main lines during peak hours.
- 5th and 6th rail lines are planned.
- 9-car and 12-car EMU are operated in this sector.

== Thiruvallur - Arakkonam ==
- This section also has 2 dedicated lines for suburban train operations apart from 2 main line for mixed traffic.
- 9-car, 12-car EMU & MEMU are operated in this sector.

== Arakkonam - Katpadi ==
- 8-car MEMU are operated in this sector.

== Katpadi - Vellore Cantonment ==
- MEMU service operate between Chennai Beach and Vellore Cantonment via Katpadi.

== Vellore Cantonment -Tiruvannamalai- Villupuram ==
- This section has been gauge converted and is being electrified along with passenger services are operating since June. Currently five passenger trains ply over this section
