= Arakkonam =

Arakkonam Arunthamizhkundram
- Suburb of Chennai
- Nickname: A-Town
- Arakkonam
- Coordinates: 13°04′40″N 79°40′00″E
- Country: India
- State: Tamil Nadu
- Suburban: Chennai Metropolitan Area

Government
  - Type: First Grade Municipality
  - Body: Arakkonam Municipality

Area
  - Total: 9.06 km^{2} (3.50 sq mi)

Population (2011)
  - Total: 78,395
  - Density: 8,650/km^{2} (22,400/sq mi)

Languages
  - Official: Tamil
- Time zone: UTC+5:30 (IST)
- PIN: 631001 to 631006
- Vehicle registration: TN-73Z
- Website: www.arakkonam.info

Arakkonam (Tamil: [aɾakkoːɳam]) is a railway town in the Ranipet district, state of Tamil Nadu. Included within the Chennai Metropolitan Area since 2022, Arakkonam is a major suburb of the state capital city Chennai, with a population of 78,395 per the census 2011. It is about 54 kilometres (34 mi) from the district headquarters Ranipet, and about 69 kilometres (43 mi) from Chennai.

Arakkonam is one of the hottest towns in India, where the temperature can exceed 43 °C (110 °F) for several peak days in summer it is famous for temples this city is developing day by day and it is one of the best city in Ranipet District The name 'Arakkonam' was derived from the word "Arunthamizhkundram" also later called "Aarukonam", meaning 'hexagon' which connects six important places around.

== History ==
The ancient name of the town was "Arumthamizh kundram" ("Arumtamil kunram") which is believed to have been derived from the Tamil words aaru konam meaning "six angles" or hexagon, based on the fact that six important places exist on the town's six sides, namely Kanchipuram, Thakkolam, Manavur, Thiruvalangadu, Thiruttani and Sholinghur.

Arakkonam Junction is one of the oldest junctions in the country connecting with major cities such as Chennai, Vellore, Bangalore, Mumbai, Goa, Vijayawada, Hyderabad, Coimbatore, Tirupati, Mangalore, Kochi and Thiruvananthapuram.

== Administration ==
The Arakkonam Municipality was constituted as a 3rd Grade Municipality on 1 October 1958 and upgraded to a 2nd Grade Municipality on 1 May 1974 and has been a 1st Grade Municipality from 17 April 1984. The area of the municipality is 9.06 km^{2} (3.50 sq mi). Arakkonam is a part of the assembly and parliamentary constituencies of the same name. This municipality contains 36 wards.

== Infrastructure ==
Arakkonam Junction railway station is one of the largest railway junction in Tamil Nadu. It strategically located at the intersection of the Chennai–Bangalore line, Arakkonam–Chengalpattu branch line and the Guntakal–Chennai line, which is part of Mumbai–Chennai line. The town has one of the biggest workshops for Southern Railway, known as the 'Engineering Workshop' (EWS) which has many employees serving the Indian Railways in various process related with fabrication and processing of various metal components for the railways. Most of the machines in these workshops are a century old and some of them are working. It also has an electric locomotive shed, 'Electric Loco Shed' (ELS). WAG-5 HA, WAP-4, WAP-7 and WAG-9 locomotives are maintained here. Suburban electric train facility is also available towards Chennai. Arakkonam junction is also feature in a song "Vellarikka" of movie Kadhal Kottai starring Ajith Kumar and Devayani.

The second-biggest Food Corporation of India (FCI) godown is located at Arakkonam in Tamil Nadu. It is used to store all types of food grains for a long periods. Transport is also available by road to all major cities and towns.

The runway at INS Rajali, a naval air force of the Indian Navy in Arakkonam is 4,500 metres in length, making it the second-longest air force runway in the Indian Subcontinent. It is also Asia's second-biggest Naval Training Centre.

Other industries include MRF Tyres, Ramco Industries and UltraTech Cement.

Many official buildings in Arakkonam were built during the British era. An underpass beneath the railway connects Arakkonam and Kanchipuram and is one of the city's oldest structures. It was built with lime mortar and stones.

== Demographics ==
Religious census
Religion	Percent(%)
Hindu	81.22%
Muslim	9.83%
Christian	7.95%
Sikh	0.04%
Buddhist	0.03%
Jain	0.35%
Other	0.58%
No religion	0.01%

According to 2011 census, Arakonam had a population of 78,395 with a sex-ratio of 1,020 females for every 1,000 males, much above the national average of 929. A total of 7,727 were under the age of six, constituting 3,995 males and 3,732 females. Scheduled Castes and Scheduled Tribes accounted for 27.1% and 1.11% of the population respectively. The average literacy of the town was 81.81%, compared to the national average of 72.99%. The town had a total of 19507 households. There were a total of 26,029 workers, comprising 80 cultivators, 206 main agricultural labourers, 674 in house hold industries, 21,857 other workers, 3,212 marginal workers, 42 marginal cultivators, 33 marginal agricultural labourers, 156 marginal workers in household industries and 2,981 other marginal workers. As per the religious census of 2011, Arakonam had 81.22% Hindus, 9.83% Muslims, 7.95% Christians, 0.04% Sikhs, 0.03% Buddhists, 0.35% Jains, 0.58% following other religions and 0.01% following no religion or did not indicate any religious preference.

== Politics ==
Arakkonam (State Assembly Constituency) is part of the Arakkonam (Lok Sabha constituency). The TVK candidate Thiru.V Gandhiraj, won the Arakkonam assembly constituency in the 2026 elections.

In the parliamentary elections held in 2024, the DMK candidate Thiru S. Jagathrakshakan, was elected MP from this constituency 2024 Lok Sabha election.
