= West Line, Chennai Suburban =

West Line

Overview
- Status: Operational
- Termini: Chennai Central (Madras Central); Jolarpet
- Stations: 57

Service
- Type: Suburban railway
- System: Chennai Suburban Railway
- Operator: Southern Railway (India)
- Depot: Avadi

Technical
- Line length: 213 kilometres (132 mi) (69 km Suburban and 144 km MEMU)
- Track length: 526 kilometres (327 mi)
- Num of tracks: 4 (till Puliyamangalam) 2 (till Jolarpet)
- Track gauge: Broad Gauge
- Operating speed: 90 km/h (maximum service speed)
Route map
Chennai Central MMC — Jolarpet

The West line of Chennai Suburban Railway is the second longest line running west from MGR Chennai Central (Madras Central) to Jolarpettai covering a distance of 213 km. Suburban services terminate at Tiruttani and MEMU services run to Jolarpettai. As of 2009, around 400,000 commuters travel every day on the 171 suburban services operated in the Arakkonam-Chennai Central section.

== Sections ==
=== Chennai Central MMC - Thiruvallur ===
- This section has 2 dedicated lines for suburban train operations and 2 main lines.
- Some fast local EMUs are operated along 3rd and 4th main lines during peak hours .
- 12-car EMU are operated in this sector.
- 5th and 6th rail lines are planned.

=== Tiruvallur - Arakkonam ===
- There are 2 dedicated lines for suburban trains and 2 lines for mixed traffic.
- 12-car EMU are operated in this sector.

=== Arakkonam - Katpadi ===
- No Suburban EMU trains operate in this section of west line.
- Only 5 MEMU Service operated from Arakkonam to Katpadi.

=== Katpadi - Jolarpet ===
- Only 1 MEMU operates between Arakkonam and Jolarpet.
