= Chennai Suburban Railway =

Commuter rail in Chennai, India

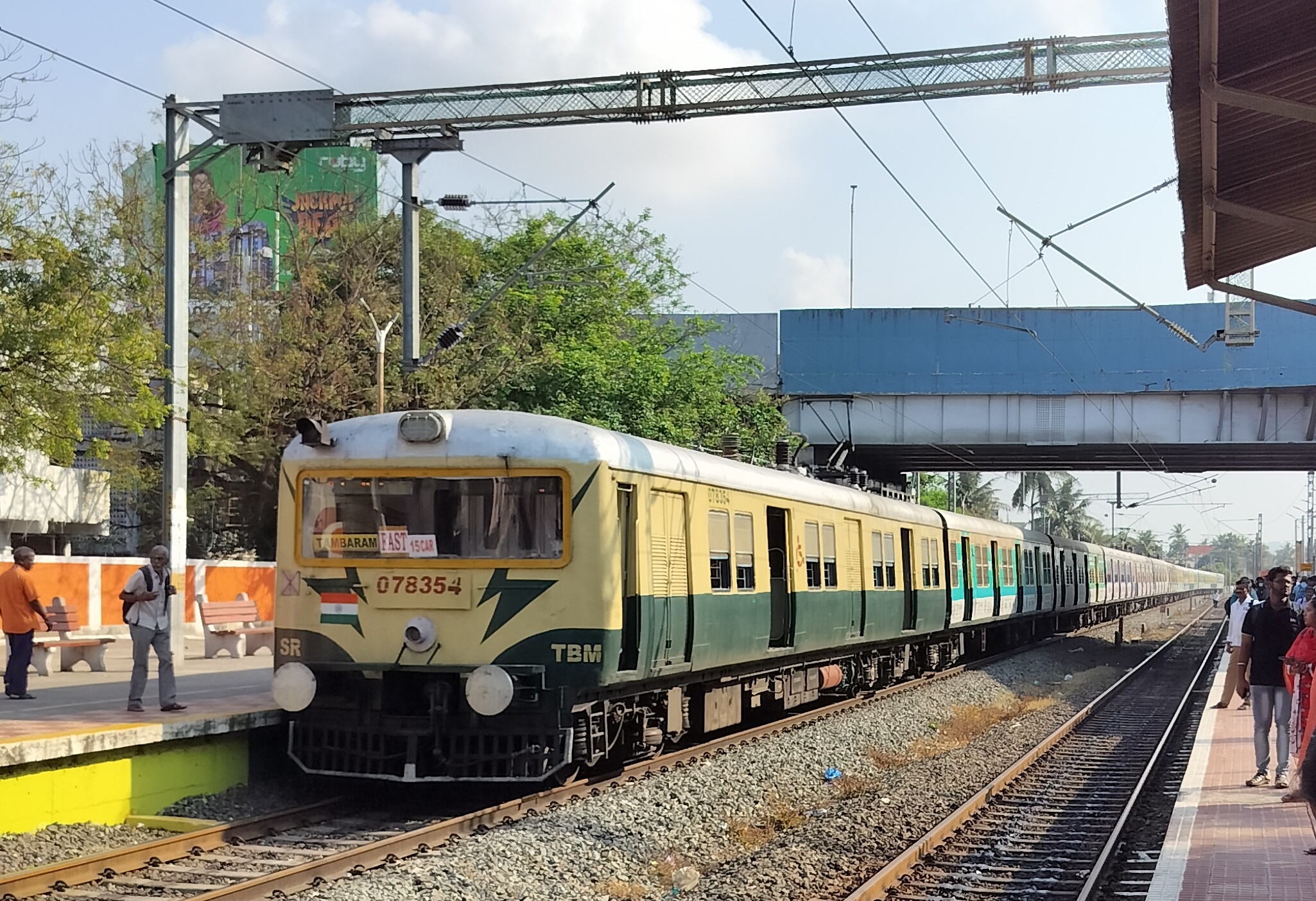
- A 15 car fast local train at Perungulathur heading towards Tambaram

Overview
- Owner: Indian Railways
- Area served: Tamil Nadu: Greater Chennai, Tiruvallur, Chengalpattu, Kancheepuram, Ranipet, Vellore, Tirupattur, Tiruvannamalai, Villupuram; Andhra Pradesh: Chittoor, Tirupati, Sullurpeta, Nellore; Puducherry: Pondicherry
- Locale: Chennai Metropolitan Area, Tamil Nadu, India
- Transit type: Suburban rail
- Number of lines: 8 routes, all with 4 tracks
- Line number: North Line; West Line; South Line; West-North Line; West-South Line; South-West Line; Chennai MRTS; Circular Line
- Number of stations: 300+
- Daily ridership: 2.5 million
- Annual ridership: 912.57 million/year (2018–2019)
- Headquarters: Southern Railway Headquarters, Chennai
- Website: https://sr.indianrailways.gov.in

Operation
- Began operation: April 2,1931; 95 years ago
- Operator: Southern Railways
- Character: At-grade, elevated
- Train length: 12/9 coaches

Technical
- System length: 1,211.81 km (752.98 mi) (unique); 509.71 km (316.72 mi) true suburban; 702.1 km (436.3 mi) MEMU service
- Track gauge: 5 ft 6 in (1,676 mm) Indian gauge
- Electrification: 25 kV 50 Hz AC overhead catenary
- Average speed: 50 km/h (31 mph)
- Top speed: 100 km/h (62 mph)
Chennai Suburban Railway Network
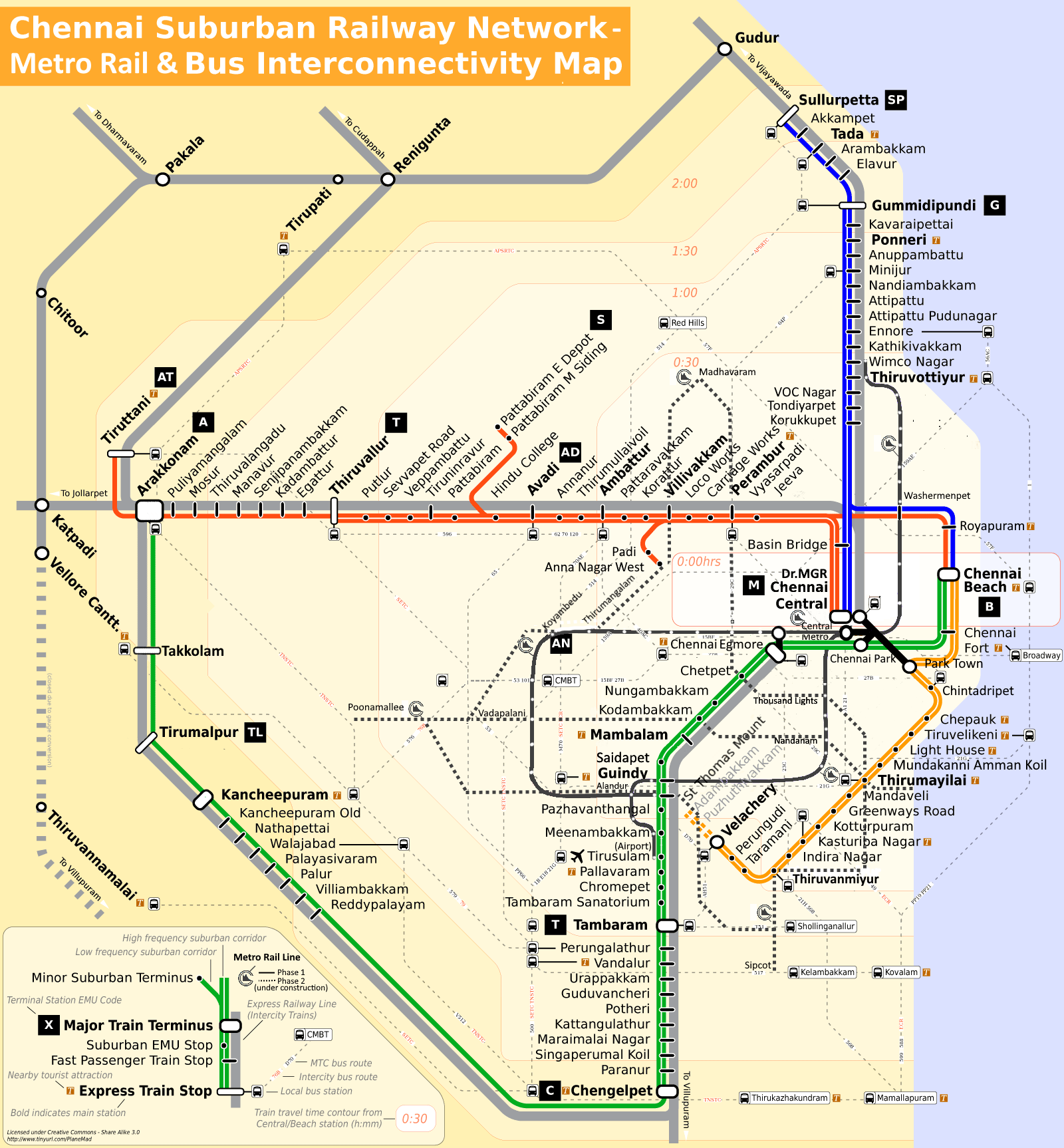

The Chennai Suburban Railway is a commuter rail system in the city of Chennai, Tamil Nadu, India, operated by the Southern Railways branch of Indian Railways. It is India's second largest suburban rail network in terms of route length and the third largest in terms of commuters. Around 1,000 services are operated daily between 4:00 a.m. and midnight. It is the longest suburban circular route in India covering of 235.5 km (146.3 mi).

Chennai has a complex railway network. It is the third busiest suburban rail system in India after Mumbai and Kolkata. It has separate tracks for local and express trains. The system extensively uses electrical multiple units (EMUs) operating on alternating current (AC) drawn from overhead wires through the catenary system. The total system spans around 1,211.81 kilometres (752.98 mi), of which only 509.71 kilometres (316.72 mi) have dedicated dual tracks for suburban EMUs; the rest share tracks with other trains and are called mainline EMUs (MEMUs). As of 2013, the suburban sector has 1,000 services, including 250 in the Beach–Chengalpattu section, 240 services in the Chennai Central–Arakkonam section, and 90 in the Chennai Central–Gummidipoondi section. As of 2020, 2.5 million people use the suburban train services daily and 401.72 million passenger every year. This includes 8,20,000 in the Beach–Tambaram section, 5,50,000 in the Central–Tiruvallur section, and 2,00,000 in the Central–Gummidipoondi section and 2,00,000 in the MRTS section. This is a 13.2 percent increase over the previous year. A total of 65 stations in the suburban section have bicycle stands.

== History ==
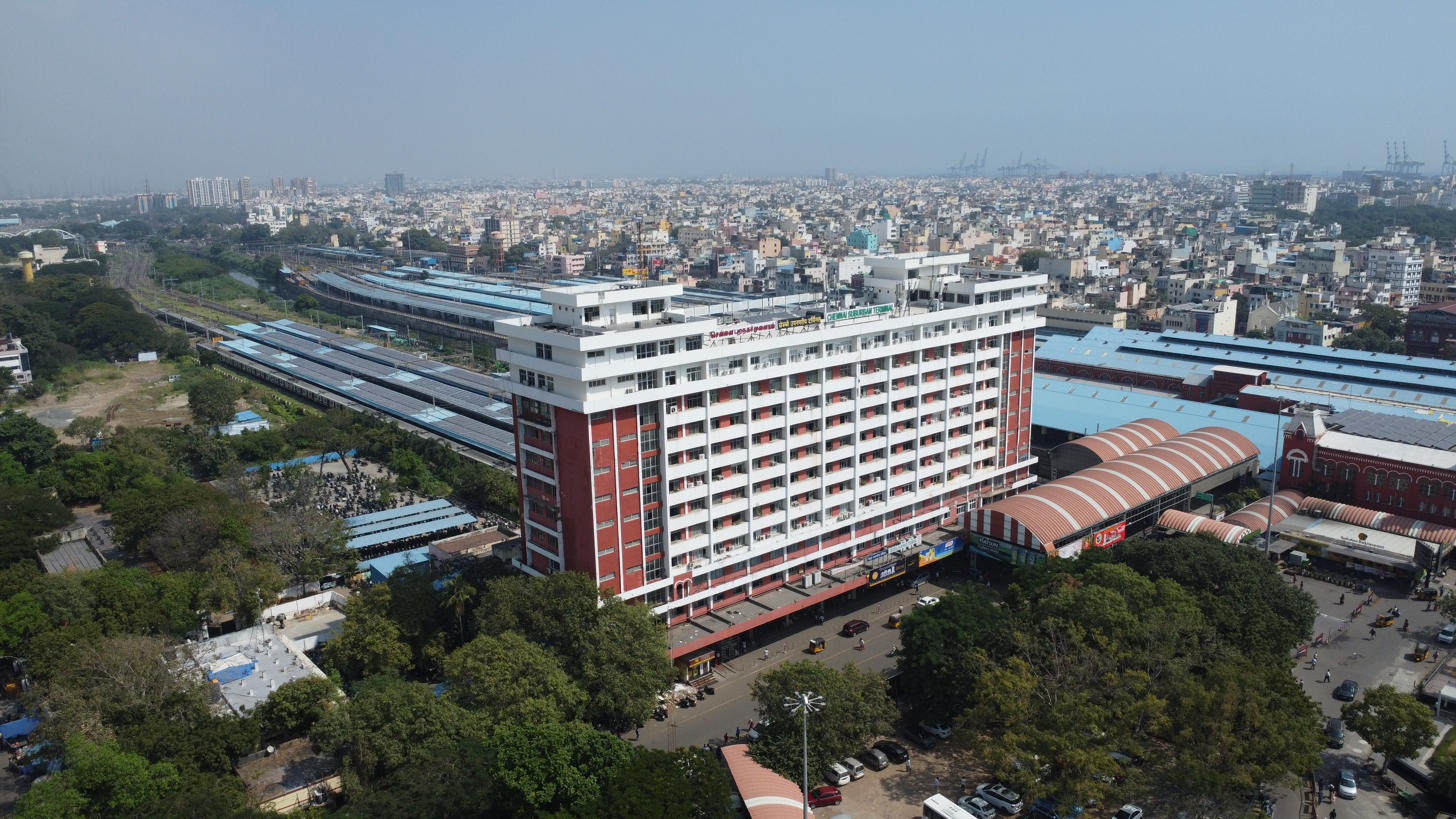
Chennai Suburban Terminal near the intercity Chennai Central Railway Station, one of the prime destinations of the Chennai Suburban Railway system

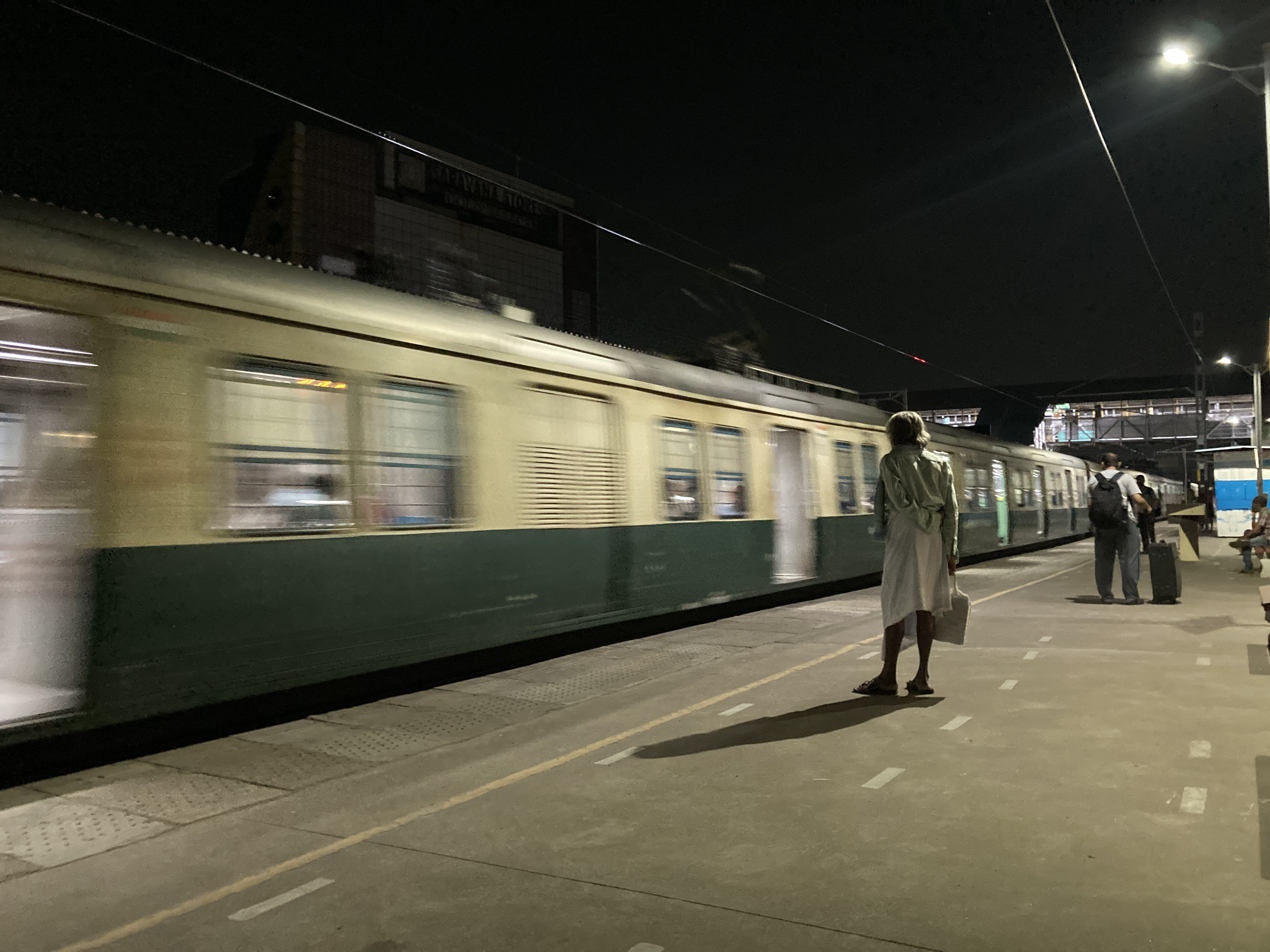
A suburban train arrives at Mambalam Railway Station.

Chennai has a fairly extensive suburban electric multiple unit (EMU) service. It was in the 1920s that the then British government felt the necessity of connecting the northern part of the city, which was mainly commercial, with the chiefly residential southwestern parts. In 1928, work began on constructing two meter gauge (MG) lines connecting the harbour with the southern suburb of Tambaram to run services using steam locomotives. In early 1930, however, the government decided to electrify the lines, including the mainline starting from Egmore. The plan to electrify railway lines in Madras was first initiated in 1923 by Sir Percy Rothera, an agent of the South Indian Railways. This was on account of the city's rapid expansion, with largely agricultural areas such as Saidapet, St. Thomas Mount and Tambaram developing into residential quarters. The plan to build a new line between Beach and Egmore and two lines between Egmore and Tambaram was announced as part of the suburban remodelling initiative of South Indian Railways. The rolling stock, consisting of rigid wooden-bodied coaches, were built by Metro-Cammell. On 27 December 1930, the first consignment of 25 electric carriages from England was received by the railway. The trains were painted in dull green with a black wheel base and featured wide sliding doors, a better-designed seating arrangement, and thick glass fronts. The new carriages were parked in Tambaram station. By March 1931, the construction works were completed, and the first electrically operated rail service in Madras began on 2 April 1931 between Madras Beach and Tambaram, which became the earliest metre gauge to be electrified in the country. It was launched by Sir George Fredrick Stanley, the then governor of Madras, who at the opening ceremony was reported to have said that the new train services would transform "desolate south Madras into burgeoning garden cities".

However, the suburban services were opened to the public only a month later on 11 May 1931. The section was electrified on 15 November 1931, with the first MG EMU services running on 1.5 kV DC. The Madras Electricity Supply Corporation, which powered the railway lines, was aided by sub-stations in Egmore and Meenambakkam. Soon, the number of trains shuttling passengers was increased to 45 a day, running every 10 minutes at peak hours, and every 30 minutes, otherwise. The running time between Madras Beach and Tambaram stations, which was 2 hours until then, was reduced to 49 minutes. The train service was made available from 4:00 in the morning up to 12:00 at night.

In the same year, mainline DC locomotives (YCG-1) were introduced to haul freight from the port. The system had the meter-gauge (MG) EMUs (YAU series) until the gauge conversion. Since then, the system has only the broad-gauge (BG) EMUs running.

In the 1960s, the line from Madras Beach to Villupuram was converted to 25 kV AC traction. This began with the conversion of the Madras Beach–Tambaram section on 15 January 1967. The rolling stock was changed to EMUs with motors and electricals from Toshiba or Hitachi. These were built by the Integral Coach Factory based in the city. Services too were extended to Chengleput with two daily services. In the late 1967, a Toshiba/Hitachi/Mitsubishi combine model YAM-1 21904 locomotive was introduced, which became the first MG 25 kV AC locomotive. Work on additional MG track between Tambaram and Chengleput began in 1969 and was completed in January 1971.

In 1986 or 1987, suburban services to northern and western parts of the city began from the newly built Moore market terminal exclusively built for suburban services, which were earlier operating from the central station terminal (First BG Suburban Services in Chennai). With the growth in suburban traffic and the existing gauge lacking sufficient carrying capacity, the Indian Railway decided to convert the entire section between Beach and Tambaram, which by then had three MG lines, to BG in early 1991, with a 50:50 joint venture with the state government. The first BG line was laid in the section in 1992 parallel to the existing MG lines. The work was completed in February 1993. Of the three existing MG lines, two were exclusively used for suburban service and the third one was used for mainline express and passenger trains. The newly laid BG line started handling suburban trains supplementing the MG suburban lines.

In 1998, further to the Chengleput–Villupuram–Tiruchirapalli gauge conversion project, the railway decided to convert one of the MG lines in the section between Tambaram and Chengleput. However, the decision was soon changed due to large-scale protests by suburban commuters. This resulted in the conversion of the 'down' MG line (the easternmost line out of Tambaram) to BG, in addition to laying of a new parallel MG line. Within a year, work on the new BG was completed. By late 1999, there were two MG lines and one BG line between Tambaram and Chengleput, and the new BG line was electrified by late 2000. The conversion of the mainline MG line between Egmore and Tambaram began in 2000, resulting in Tambaram station temporarily acting as terminal point for mainline express and passenger trains originally originating from and terminating at Egmore. This resulted in increase in traffic at Tambaram station, where two additional MG lines were built. In March 2001, the gauge conversion project in the Madras–Madurai section was completed and BG passenger services began, and the Beach–Tambaram section featured two MG and two BG lines. In December 2001, electrification work of the Chengleput–Villupuram BG line commenced. Gauge conversion work of two MG lines between Beach and Egmore began in December 2002 and was completed by February 2003. This resulted in increased BG EMU services between Beach and Tambaram and the MG services from Tambaram terminating at Egmore. The spur MG lines in the Beach–Washermanpet section were dismantled.

In February 2003, one of the MG lines between Tambaram and Chengalpet was taken up for conversion and was completed in December 2003, which was used for BG EMU services and by mainline express trains. This resulted in 2 BG lines and 1 MG line in the Tambaram–Chengleput section by the end of 2003. The last MG EMU services between the 30-kilometre (19 mi) Egmore–Tambaram section were run on 1 July 2004, marking the end of the regular service of the YAM-1 locomotives, and the gauge conversion work in this section began. All MG mainline trains were switched over to diesel traction.

On 1 November 2004, with the completion of the gauge-conversion work in this section, BG EMU services were inaugurated in the Beach-Chengalpattu Section with the addition of 15 new rakes from ICF.

In September 2020, the conversion of the third meter-gauge line between Singaperumal Koil and Guduvancherry on the Tambaram–Chengalpattu stretch to broad gauge was completed and opened for traffic.

In February 2021, with the opening of four lines between Chennai Beach and Attipattu at a cost of ₹ 2.9 billion, all the eight routes in the Chennai section have four lines each.

== Lines ==
Chennai Suburban railway network

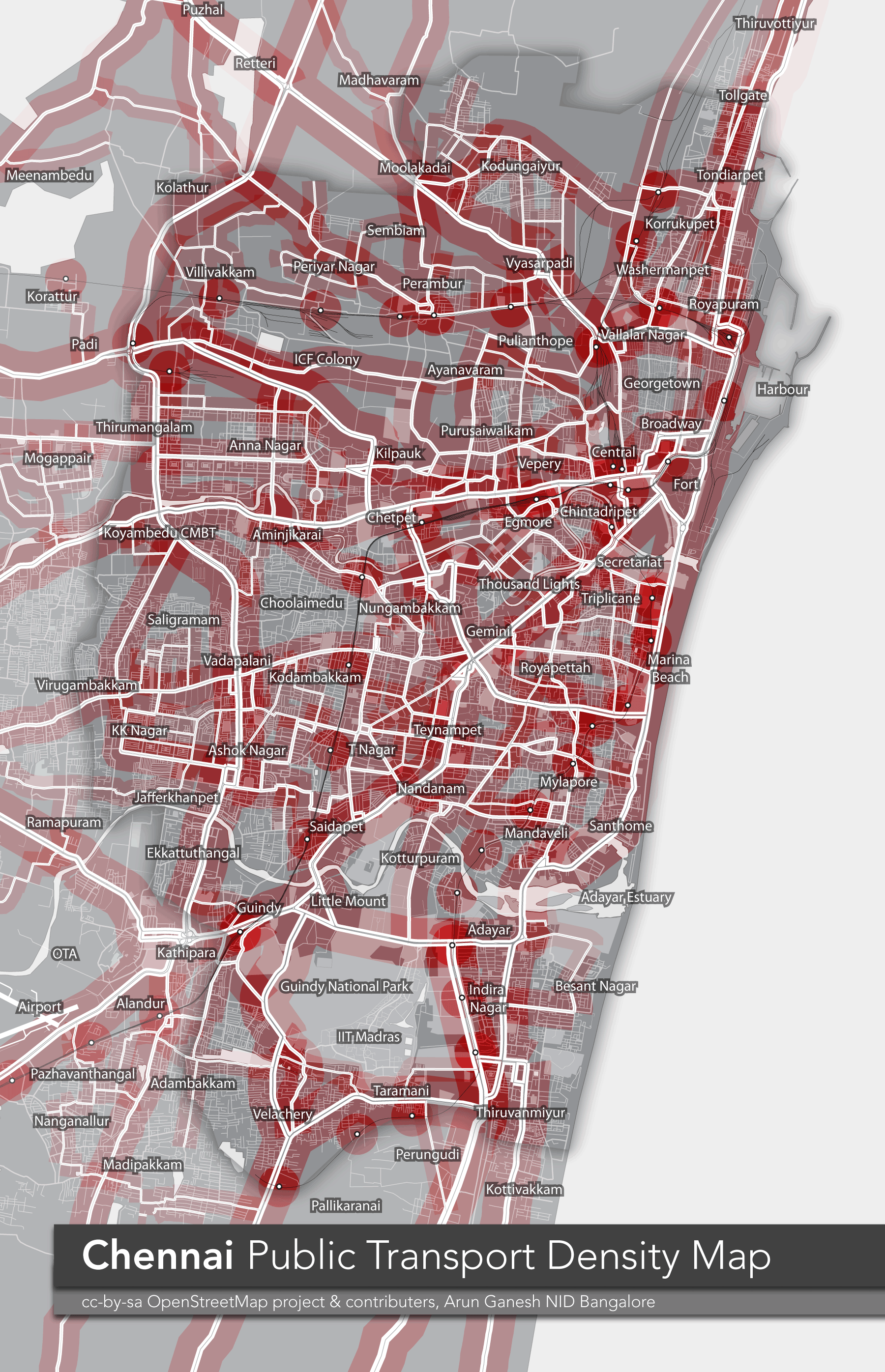
Heat-map of the coverage of public transportation in Chennai City

Fundamentally, Chennai has four suburban railway lines, namely, North line, West line, South line and the MRTS line. The South West line, West North line and West South line are merely minor extensions or modifications of the aforementioned suburban lines. The MRTS is a suburban railway line that chiefly runs on an elevated track exclusively used for running local EMUs or suburban local trains. No express trains or passenger trains run on MRTS line.

=== North Line ===
This line runs from the city towards the north, hence the name.

Chennai city region stations: Chennai Beach – Royapuram – Washermanpet – Chennai Central MMC – Basin Bridge – Korukkupet – Tondiarpet – V.O.C.Nagar – Tiruvottiyur – Wimco Nagar – Kathivakkam – Ennore – Athipattu Pudhunagar – Athipattu – Nandiambakkam

Tiruvallur District stations: Minjur – Anupambattu – Ponneri – Kavaraipettai – Gummidipoondi – Elavur – Arambakkam

Outside state regions (Andhra Pradesh): Tada – Akkampeta – Sullurupeta - Polireddipalem - Doravarichatram - Nayudupeta - Pedapariya - Odur

Outside state regions (Andhra Pradesh - SCoR): Gudur - Nellore - Bitragunta

A few train services originate from Chennai Beach instead of Chennai Central. Trains originating from Chennai Beach pass through Royapuram and Washermanpet to reach Korukkupet. From Korukkupet the route is same as listed above.

- The total length of North Line Suburban Services is 83 kilometres (52 miles) (Chennai Central to Sulurpetta)
- Suburban EMU services terminate at Sullurpeta (AP).
- MEMU service is up to Nellore.
- Currently 83 train services run on the North Suburban line, whose split up is as follows
  - 37 services begin from Chennai Central towards Northern suburbs, while another 37 services originate from the Northern suburbs proceeding to Chennai Central.
  - Only 5 train services are run from Chennai Beach towards Northern suburbs, and there are 7 services in the return direction towards Chennai Beach.
- This is the only route in India where a suburban train is operated outside the state.

=== South Line ===
(along Grand Southern Trunk Road from St. Thomas Mount to Chengalpattu)

Chennai city region stations: Chennai Beach – Chennai Fort – Chennai Park – Chennai Egmore – Chetpet – Nungambakkam – Kodambakkam – Mambalam – Saidapet – Guindy – St. Thomas Mount – Pazhavanthangal – Meenambakkam – Tirisulam – Pallavaram – Chromepet – Tambaram Sanatorium – Tambaram – Perungalathur – Vandalur - Kilambakkam

Stations outside Chennai city regions below:

Urapakkam – Guduvancheri – Potheri – Kattankulathur – Maraimalai Nagar – Singaperumal Koil – Paranur – Chengalpattu

Stations in the South line after Chengalpattu below: Tirumani - Ottivakkam - Padalam - Karunguzhi - Madurantakam - Pakkam - Melmaruvathur - Acharapakkam - Tozhuppedu - Karasangal - Olakur - Panchalam - Tindivanam - Mailam, Perani - Vikravandi - Mundiyampakkam - Villupuram -Valavanur railway station - Chinna Babu Samudram - Villianur and terminates at Puducherry

Stations in the South West line after Chengalpattu below:

Reddipalayam – Villiambakkam – Palur – Palayaseevaram – Walajabad – Nathapettai – Kanchipuram – Tirumalpur – Takkolam - Arakkonam

- Suburban trains are operated till Arakkonam via Chengalpattu in South West Line.
- Suburban electric trains on Southern line route are terminated at Chengalpet station.
- MEMU services proceed in the southern direction from Chengalpet on the line towards Villupuram and Puducherry. The Chennai Beach to Melmaruvathur MEMU halts at Ottivakkam, Padalam, Karunkuzhi, Maduranthakam to reach Melmaruvathur, which is 90 kilometres (56 mi) from Chennai Beach.
- Puducherry MEMU service runs from Chennai Egmore and halts at Mambalam, Guindy, Tambaram, Guduvancheri, Singaperumal Koil, Chengalpattu Junction, Madurantakam, Melmaruvathur, Tindivanam, Mailman, Vikravandi, Mundiyampakkam, Villupuram Junction, Valavanur, Chinna Babu Samudram, Villianur and terminates at Puducherry.
- Circular train running between Chennai Beach to Chennai Beach – via Tambaram, Chengalpattu, Tirumalpur, Arakkonam, Tiruvallur and Perambur
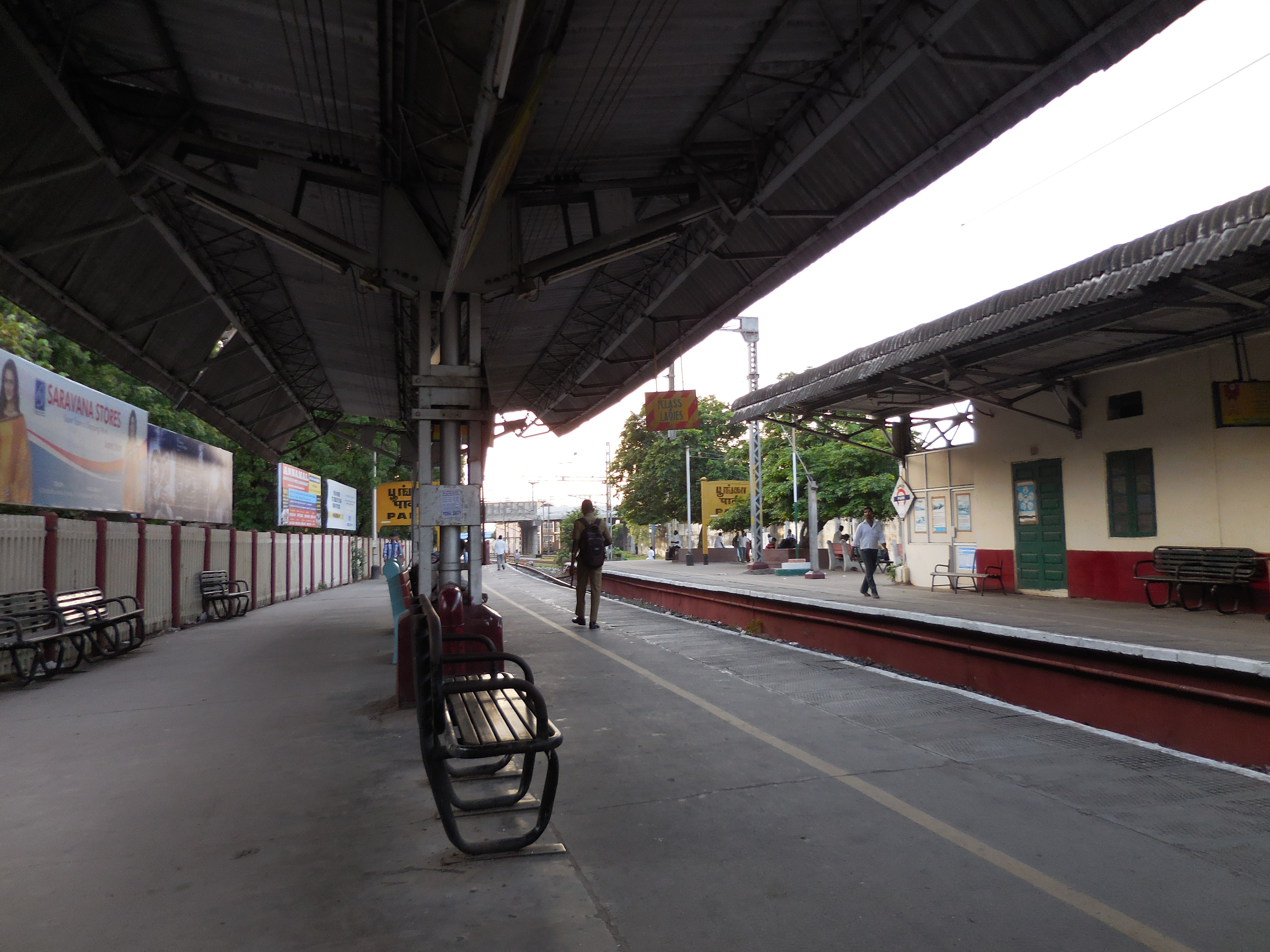
- Chennai Park railway station
  Currently 240 services are being run on the South Suburban line.

Important stations on the South Line:

- Chennai Beach – Terminal Station for all South and MRTS line trains and a few north and west line trains. Close to Chennai Port and Harbour, easily accessible to Marina Beach, Anna Memorial Square.
- Chennai Fort – established near Fort St. George, the chief Secretariat of the state, Close to the commercial hub of Parry's Corner or Broadway.
- Chennai Park – Lies opposite Chennai Central which is a terminus for long distance and suburban trains. Also close to Park Town MRTS station.
- Chennai Egmore – A major terminal of Southern Railways, serving as terminal for south bound and south east bound railroute of Tamil Nadu.
- Mambalam – Lies in the commercial and textile hub of T. Nagar. Halt station for several long-distance express trains.
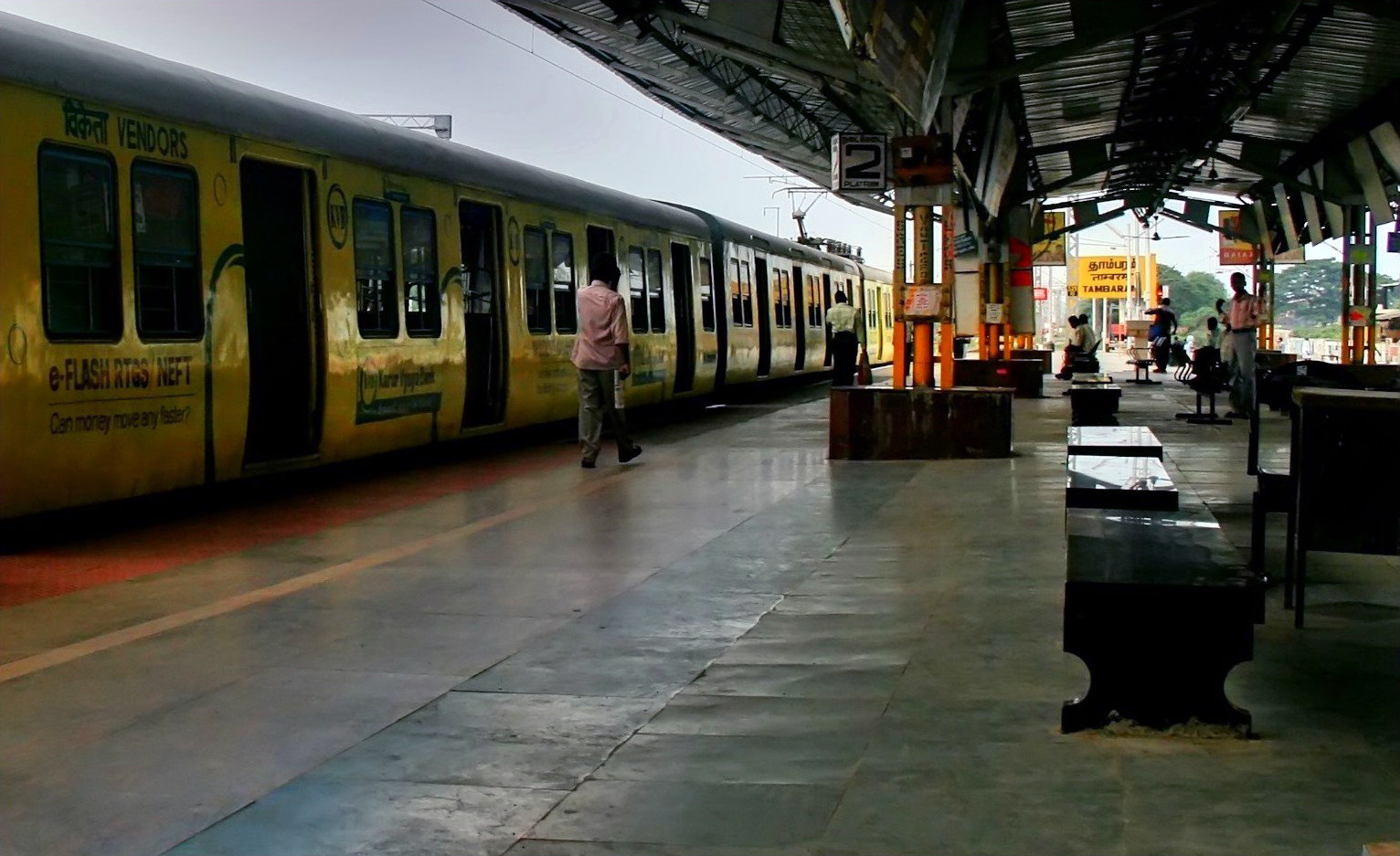
- A Chennai Beach bound EMU in its original livery to start from Tambaram
  Guindy – an interchange with Mount Road metro Line (blue line). Close to Guindy Industrial Estate, Guindy National Park, and bus terminus.
- St Thomas Mount – an interchange for 100 feet Road Metro Line (blue and red lines) and MRTS line, Easily accessible to Pallavaram Military Cantonment, Military Canteen and Hospital.
- Tirusulam – Lies opposite to Chennai International Airport
- Chromepet – Lies nearby to Chromepet Bus Stand, Madras Institute of Technology and nearby to Saravana Stores
- Tambaram – A terminus for several local suburban trains and a halt for long-distance express trains. Tambaram is also the Southern Gateway of Chennai. Tambaram Railway Station is a 3rd terminal of Chennai city. Several South bound Expresses originate here.
- Perungulathur station which is located on the main intersection junction on GST road which is the major gateway entry to Chennai city and also located proximity to Perungulathur Bus stop and IT Hub nearby. It is also one of the top revenue generating station in entire Southern Railway network.
- Paranur Station which is near to Mahindra world city, home for more than 100 multinational companies including Infosys, Renault Nissan, Wipro and much more. This is the busiest station in Tambaram to Chengalpattu line.
- Chengalpet Junction – A junction with three lines and a halt station for long-distance express trains. From here Suburban EMU Trains towards Kancheepuram and Arakkonam diverges and proceeds their way.

=== West Line ===
Chennai Beach – Royapuram - Washermanpet – Chennai Central MMC – Basin Bridge railway station – Vyasarpadi Jeeva – Perambur – Perambur Carriage Works – Perambur Loco Works – Villivakkam – Korattur – Pattaravakkam – Ambattur – Thirumullaivoyal – Annanur – Avadi – Hindu College – Pattabiram – Pattabiram Military Siding – Pattabiram East Depot – Nemilichery – Thiruninravur – Veppampattu – Sevvapet Road – Putlur – Tiruvallur – Egattur – Kadambattur – Senjipanambakkam – Manavur – Thiruvalangadu – Mosur – Puliyamangalam – Arakkonam - Ichiputtur – Tiruttani - Ponpadi - Venkatanarasimharajuvaripeta - Nagari - Ekambarakuppam - Vepagunta - Puttur - Taduku - Sri Venkata Perumal Raju Puram - Pudi - Renigunda - Tiruchanur terminates at Tirupati

Jolarpettai - Kettandapatti - Vaniyambadi - Vinnamangalam - Ambur - Pachchakuppam - Melpadi - Valathoor - Mel-Alattur - Gudiyattam - Kavanoor - Virinchipuram - Latteri - Katpadi - Seevur - Thiruvalam railway station - Mukundarayapuram - Walajah Road - Marudhalam - Thalangai railway station - Sholinghur - Mahendravady - Anavardhikhanpettai - Chitteri - Melpakam terminates at Arakkonam

Viluppuram - Venkatesapuram - Teli - Mambalapattu - Ayandur - Mugaiyur - Tirukoilur - Adhichchanur - Andampallam - Tandarai - Velanandal - Tiruvannamalai - Turijapuram - Agaram Sibbandi - Polur Arani Road - Sedarampattu - Kannamangalam - Vellore Cantonment - Vellore Town - Katpadi - Seevur - Thiruvalam - Mukundarayapuram - Walajah Road - Marudhalam - Thalangai - Sholinghur - Mahendravady - Anavardhikhanpettai - Chitteri - Melpakam terminates at Arakkonam

- Suburban EMU train services terminate at Tiruttani.
- However, MEMU services run up to Tirupati, Vellore Cantonment, Tiruvannamalai, and Jolarpettai.
- Arakkonam Junction is the important terminus for other trains coming to Chennai.
- Few trains operate from Chennai Beach. These trains from Chennai Beach cover a distance of 5.64 kilometres (3.50 mi) via Royapuram and Washermanpet stations to reach Vysarpadi, beyond which the alignment is the same as the trains from Chennai Central. Most beach-bound trains operate from Arakkonam via Chengalpattu, Tambaram line, which is the southern line.
- There is a separate loop line divided from the Hindu College railway station just after crossing Avadi railway station in the western line. It is called Pattabiram East Depot Railway Station. Suburban trains are available from this station to Chennai Central with a service frequency of one and a half hours.

=== MRTS line ===
The MRTS line is an exclusive line of the Chennai suburban railway as it runs elevated for most of its section and it was the first elevated non-metro railway line constructed in Indian Railways and it is the longest elevated railway section in Indian Railways at present. Moreover, the route is unique as it is exclusively used to run suburban EMU trains. No Freight, express trains, MEMU trains or passenger trains ply on the MRTS route.

The MRTS currently runs from Chennai Beach to St Thomas Mount where it will intersect with the South line and Metro line (Phase 1 Green line and Phase 2 Red line) will house South line suburban trains at grade level, MRTS trains at level 1 and Metro trains at level 2.

Between Chennai Beach and Park Town, the MRTS alignment runs parallel to the South Suburban line. Beyond this, the MRTS climbs up on a gradient to reach the Chindadripet station which is elevated. The alignment remains elevated till Perungudi beyond which it slopes down to reach the Velachery station which is at grade level and will be elevated back from Velachery to St. Thomas Mount again. Beyond Thirumayilai MRTS station, the entire section is constructed as a Ballastless track till St. Thomas Mount, with exemptions at Velachery due to track crossover. Stations in Chennai MRTS include Chennai Beach, Chennai Fort, Park Town, Chintadripet, Chepauk, Triplicane, Light House, Mundakanniamman Koil, Thirumayilai, Mandaveli, Greenways Road, Kotturpuram, Kasturbai Nagar, Indira Nagar, Tiruvanmiyur, Taramani, Perungudi, Velachery, Puzhuthivakkam , Adambakkam, and St. Thomas Mount.

=== Circular line ===
At 232.5 kilometres (144.5 mi), the Chennai Suburban Railway has the longest circular rail route in India. The circular rail line was proposed in the CMDA SMP.

Stations on this route include Chennai Beach, Egmore, Tambaram, Chengalpattu Junction, Kanchipuram, Arakkonam Junction, Kadambathur , Tiruvallur, Avadi, Vyasarpadi Jeeva, Washermanpet, Royapuram, and Chennai Beach.

After finishing the complete the last leg of electrification project Takkolam – Arakkonam stretch, Chennai Beach – Chennai Egmore — Tambaram — Chengalpattu – Kanchipuram – Arakkonam – Tiruvallur – Avadi – Vysarpadi Jeeva — Washermanpet — Royapuram – Chennai Beach became India's longest circular route.

The newly laid electrified line was inspected by the Commissioner of Railway Safety (CRS) on January 25, 2019,

The first train on the circular route ran on 23 April 2019.

Initially, two trains are being operated:

1. MSB-MSB via MSB-AVD-TRL-AJJ- KPM-CGL-TBM-MSB
2. MSB-MSB via MSB-TBM-CGL-KPM-AJJ-TRL-AVD-MSB

=== Defunct lines ===
Villivakkam – Anna Nagar West Railway line

This line is one of the two branch lines of the western line (the other one is Pattabiram east depot line, which is still operational) and gets divided from Villivakkam.

This is one of the two lines that ends within the Chennai city limits (the other one is the MRTS corridor, which is still operational).

Total length of this line from Villivakkam junction to Anna Nagar West railway station is 5 km. This line consist of two stations, namely,

1. Padi railway station
2. Anna Nagar West railway station

This railway line is owned by the ICF for testing its coaches and trail runs. Later it is converted to passenger traffic. This line started its service at 2003 from Chennai Beach to Anna Nagar West via Royapuram, Villivakkam, and Padi. But the train service have been with drawn at 2007 due to many reasons and never restored till date.

Some of the reasons are:

1. The construction of the Padi flyover
2. Heavy rail traffic as it has a single railway line only
3. Poor patronage

Now this line is used by the ICF for trail runs and also used as a parking lots for empty rakes of express trains.

== Current services ==
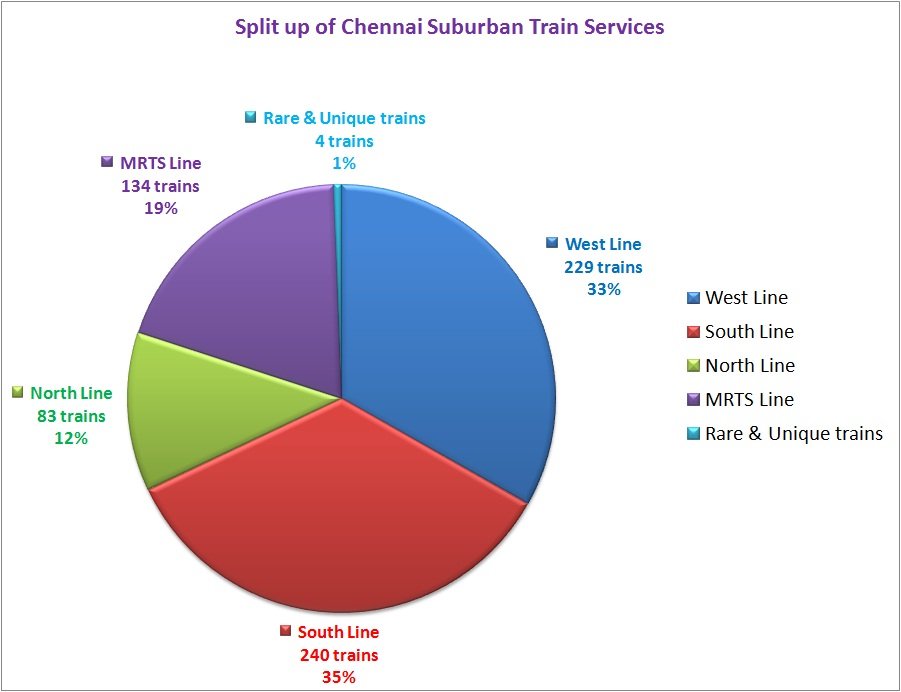
Split of suburban train services in Chennai (2013)

By 2006, the suburban system carried about 500,000 commuters daily, which rose to about 700,000 by 2009. By 2011, this has increased to 960,000 passengers a day.

As of 2006, 24 rakes, each with 9 cars, are operated every day between Tambaram and Chennai Beach, with a plan to increase the fleet to 30 rakes.

By the end of 2013, all the 9-unit EMU services in Chennai Beach–Tambaram–Chengalpattu section were expected to be converted into 12-unit services. With this the carrying capacity of the suburban services would be enhanced by another 25 percent.

As of 2017, a total of 1,180,000 passengers use the suburban services every day, including 400,000 in the western route, 560,000 in the southern route, 120,000 in the northern route, and 100,000 in the MRTS route.

=== West line ===
Chennai Central via Vysarpadi Junction and Avadi (destined to any of Pattabiram, Tiruvallur, Kadambattur, Arakkonam, Tirutani and Tirupathi): 90 services of which there are only three fast suburban locals on this route.

- From any of these source terminal stations to Chennai Central UP: 91 services. Of this only four are fast trains.
- Chennai Beach via WST-Vysarpadi DOWN:24 services of which only one is a fast local.
- In return to Chennai Beach UP: 25 services of which two are fast.
- Total for WEST Line = 229 services (towards suburbs = 151; towards MAS/MSB = 116)

=== South Line ===
- Chennai Beach via Egmore (to destined to any of Tambaram, Chengalpattu, Tirumalpur, Kanchipuram, Arakkonam): 121 services (weekdays). Of this only four are fast trains.
- South Line terminals to Chennai Beach UP:119 services (weekdays). Of this only eight are fast trains
- Total for South line = 240 services weekday (121 towards suburbs, 119 towards beach)

=== North Line ===
- Chennai Central via Korukkupet (to destined to any of Ennore, Gummidipundi, Sullurupeta): 37 services
- Return direction to MAS UP: 37 services
- No differentiation w.r.t Sundays.
- No fast trains
- Chennai Beach via Royapuram, Washermanpet, Korukupet Junction and beyond DOWN: four train services only.
- Return direction to MSB UP: five train services only.
- Total for North line = 83 services (41 towards suburbs, 42 towards MAS/MSB)

=== MRTS Line ===
As of 2026

A total of 96 electric train services will operate on this corridor:

- Chennai Beach to St Thomas Mount DOWN: 43 services
- STM to MSB UP: 43 services
- MSB - VLCY (UP & DOWN) : 4 pairs
- VLCY - STM (UP & DOWN) : 6 pairs
- Total for MRTS line = 86 services weekday (43 in each direction)
- There are slow trains on the MRTS line too

=== Unusual services ===
- On Korukkupet-Vysarpadi Line: three (two inbound and one return)
- Avadi to Ennore (without touching Basin Bridge Jn and MAS) via Korukkupet directly to Vysarpadi Jeeva
- Similarly there is a Tiruvallur to Ponneri (and reverse) (without touching Basin Bridge Jn and MAS) via Korukkupet directly to Vysarpadi Jeeva
- One daily service from Chennai beach to Chennai Central station in the evening only one way.

== AC Local ==
Up services
Sr No	Train No.	Departure	Origin	Arrival	Destination	Type
1	49001	6:50	Tambaram	7:35	Chengalpattu	Fast
1	Halts: Perungalathur, Guduvancheri Potheri, Singaperumal Koil, Paranur					
2	49003	9:43	Chennai Beach	10:43	Tambaram	Slow
3	49005	15:45	Chennai Beach	16:45	Tambaram	Slow
4	49007	18:17	Chennai Beach	19:50	Chengalpattu	Fast
4	Halts: Chennai Fort, Chennai Park, Chennai Egmore, Mambalam, Guindy, St. Thomas Mount, Tirisoolam, Chromepet, Tambaram, Perungalathur, Guduvancheri, Potheri, Singaperumal Koil, Paranur					
5	49009	18:17	Chennai Beach	19:17	Tambaram	Slow

Down services
Sr No	Train No.	Departure	Origin	Arrival	Destination	Type
1	49002	7:50	Chengalpattu	9:35	Chennai Beach	Fast
1	Halts: Paranur, Singaperumal Koil, Potheri, Guduvancheri, Perungalathur, Tambaram, Chromepet, Tirisoolam, St. Thomas Mount, Guindy, Mambalam, Chennai Egmore, Chennai Park, Chennai Fort					
2	49004	14:25	Tambaram	15:25	Chennai Beach	Slow
3	49006/10	17:00	Tambaram	18:00	Chennai Beach	Slow
4	49008	20:10	Chengalpattu	21:00	Tambaram	Fast
4	Halts: Paranur, Singaperumal Koil, Potheri, Guduvancheri, Perungalathur					

== 15 Coach Fast Local ==
Up services
Sr No	Train No.	Departure	Origin	Arrival	Destination
1	40051	7:50	Chennai Beach	8:45	Tambaram
1	Halts: Chennai Egmore, Mambalam and Guindy				
2	40053	8:20	Chennai Beach	9:20	Tambaram
2	Halts: Chennai Egmore, Mambalam and Guindy				
3	40055	9:20	Chennai Beach	10:00	Tambaram
3	Halts: Chennai Egmore, Mambalam and Guindy				
4	40057	9:50	Chennai Beach	10:50	Tambaram
4	Halts: Chennai Egmore, Mambalam and Guindy				
5	40059	10:15	Chennai Beach	11:10	Tambaram
5	Halts: Chennai Egmore, Mambalam and Guindy				
6	40061	17:15	Chennai Beach	18:00	Tambaram
6	Halts: Chennai Egmore, Mambalam and Guindy				
7	40063	17:30	Chennai Beach	18:30	Tambaram
7	Halts: Chennai Egmore, Mambalam and Guindy				
8	40065	18:20	Chennai Beach	19:15	Tambaram
8	Halts: Chennai Egmore, Mambalam and Guindy				
9	40067	19:10	Chennai Beach	20:10	Tambaram
9	Halts: Chennai Egmore, Mambalam and Guindy				
10	40069	20:00	Chennai Beach	21:00	Tambaram
10	Halts: Chennai Egmore, Mambalam and Guindy				

Down services
Sr No	Train No.	Departure	Origin	Arrival	Destination
1	40052	6:40	Tambaram	7:40	Chennai Beach
1	Halts: Guindy, Mambalam and Chennai Egmore				
2	40054	7:10	Tambaram	8:10	Chennai Beach
2	Halts: Guindy, Mambalam and Chennai Egmore				
3	40056	8:10	Tambaram	9:10	Chennai Beach
3	Halts: Guindy, Mambalam and Chennai Egmore				
4	40058	8:55	Tambaram	9:40	Chennai Beach
4	Halts: Guindy, Mambalam and Chennai Egmore				
5	40060	9:15	Tambaram	10:05	Chennai Beach
5	Halts: Guindy, Mambalam and Chennai Egmore				
6	40062	10:10	Tambaram	11:10	Chennai Beach
6	Halts: Guindy, Mambalam and Chennai Egmore				
7	40064	11:00	Tambaram	12:00	Chennai Beach
7	Halts: Guindy, Mambalam and Chennai Egmore				
8	40066	18:10	Tambaram	18:05	Chennai Beach
8	Halts: Guindy, Mambalam and Chennai Egmore				
9	40068	18:00	Tambaram	18:50	Chennai Beach
9	Halts: Guindy, Mambalam and Chennai Egmore				
10	40070	18:45	Tambaram	19:35	Chennai Beach
10	Halts: Guindy, Mambalam and Chennai Egmore				

== Interchange stations ==
S.No.	Station	Status	Connections	Details
1	Chennai Beach	Existing interchange station	North line, West line, South line and MRTS line	Chennai Beach station is close to Chennai Harbour. It is a terminal station for few of the North and West bound suburban trains and a terminal station for all south line and MRTS line suburban trains.
2	Chennai Fort	Existing interchange station	MRTS line, South line, Blue Metro Line	Chennai Fort is close to the commercial hub of Parry's corner and Broadway. It is a common station for MRTS line and South suburban line. High court station of the Blue line of upcoming Metro rail is near Fort suburban railway station
3	Chennai Central	Existing interchange station	North line, West line, MRTS line, South line, Green and Blue Metro Lines	Chennai Central's main building is a terminal for outstation express trains and mails. Chennai Central's Moore Market Complex is a terminal for suburban trains on North and West lines. Park station of South line and Park Town station of MRTS line lie opposite to Chennai Central on the Poonamalle High Road. Both the lines of the upcoming metro rail passes through Chennai Central Metro station which is underneath the Poonamalle High Road.
4	Park	Existing interchange station	MRTS,South line, North Line, West line, Green and Blue Metro Lines	Park is a suburban station on the south line while Park Town is a station on the MRTS line. Both stations are nearby and are also opposite to Chennai Central.
5	Guindy	Existing interchange station	Blue Metro Line, South suburban line	The Guindy metro station lies abutting the Guindy suburban railway station
6	St. Thomas Mount	Existing interchange station	South Suburban line, MRTS line, Green Metro Line	The MRTS line and Metro line 2 is housed in different floors of a common station complex, which lies abutting the existing south line suburban railway station. MRTS is being extended from Velachery to St Thomas Mount
7	Chengalpet Junction	Existing interchange station		Chengalpet is beyond the suburbs of Chennai, 60 kilometres (37 mi) away from the urban precinct or downtown. Three lines from Melmaruvathur, Tambaram and Thirmalpur converge at Chengalpet Junction. Chengalpet Junction is also a halt for long-distance express trains and mails.
8	Arakkonam junction	Existing interchange station		Arakkonam is located about 68 kilometres (42 mi) west of Chennai and marks the western terminus of the Chennai Suburban Railway's West Line. Four railway lines towards Chennai, Katpadi, Renigunta, and Chengalpattu converge at Arakkonam Junction, making it one of the busiest railway junctions in Tamil Nadu. Arakkonam Junction is also an important halt for numerous long-distance express and mail trains connecting southern, western, and northern India.
9	Egmore	Existing interchange Station		Egmore is also an interchange station for metro and mainline express southbound station.

== New lines ==
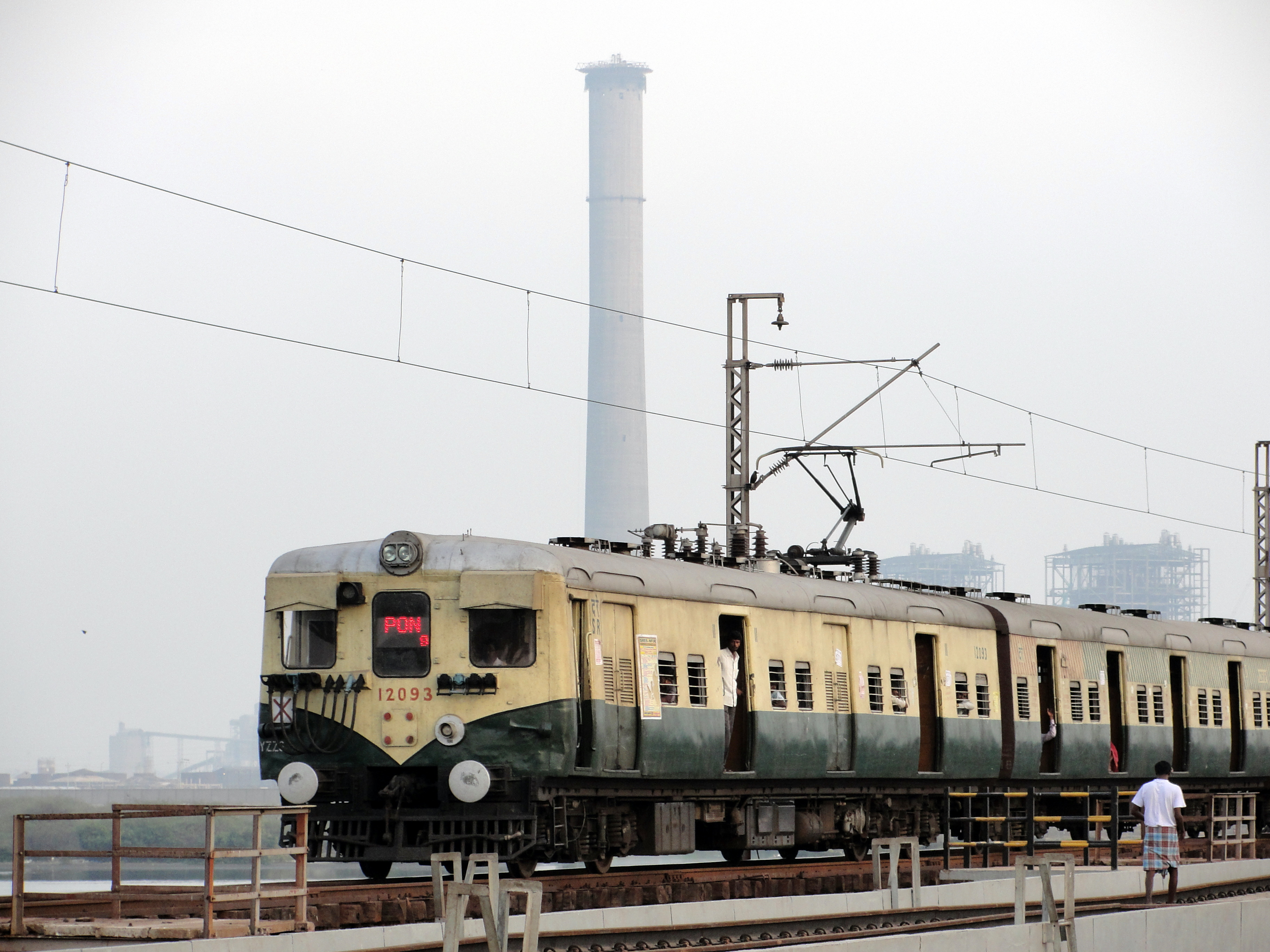
Unrefurbished EMU passing bridge over Ennore Creek

The following new lines have been proposed in the Second Master Plan by CMDA as a long-term urban transportation scheme.

- Avadi – Sriperumbudur – Kanchipuram
- Saidapet – Sriperumbudur – Kanchipuram (Partly Elevated)
- Sriperumbudur – Oragadam – Chengalpattu
- Kelambakkam – Vandalur
- St.Thomas Mount – Porur
- Avadi - Sriperumbudur - Irugattukottai - Guduvancheri ( DRP under preparing )

The Avadi–Sriperumbudur line will cover a distance of 26.65 kilometres (16.56 mi) at a cost of ₹ 2,550 million. The railways also plan to lay a 179-kilometre (111 mi) Perungudi–Cuddalore railway line via Mahabalipuram.

=== Comprehensive Transportation Study ===
The following new lines have been proposed in the Comprehensive Transportation Study of the Chennai Metropolitan Development Authority. These lines will provide a circumferential travel network for the city.

- Perungudi – Sholinganallur – Scrapped due to metro rail project
- Mamallapuram – Chengalpattu – Pending
- Chengalpattu – Tindivanam – Considering extending some Chengalpattu bound EMUs to Tindivanam
- Korattur – Sholinganallur – Scrapped due to metro rail project

== Fares and ticketing ==
Per the 2013 Railway Budget, the railway increased the Chennai suburban ticket fare by eight paise per kilometre, although the railway ministry has hiked it by two paise per kilometre. The number of fare schedules has also been reduced to four—₹5 (5.3¢ US),₹10 (11¢ US), ₹15 (16¢ US) and ₹20 (21¢ US)—from the eight tables earlier. Also ticket denominations have been rounded off to multiples of ₹5 (5.3¢ US). As per the revised rates, a person traveling up to 20 kilometres (12 mi) will have to pay ₹5 (5.3¢ US), between 21 and 45 kilometres (13 and 28 mi) ₹10 (11¢ US), between 46 and 70 kilometres (29 and 43 mi) ₹15 (16¢ US) and between 71 and 100 kilometres (44 and 62 mi) ₹20 (21¢ US).

In 2012 (January–December), the Chennai division of Southern Railway zone generated ₹142.9 million (US$1.5 million) through penalties imposed on ticketless and irregular travellers, which is marginally higher than ₹136 million (US$1.5 million) generated during the previous fiscal (April 2011–March 2012).

== Rolling stock ==
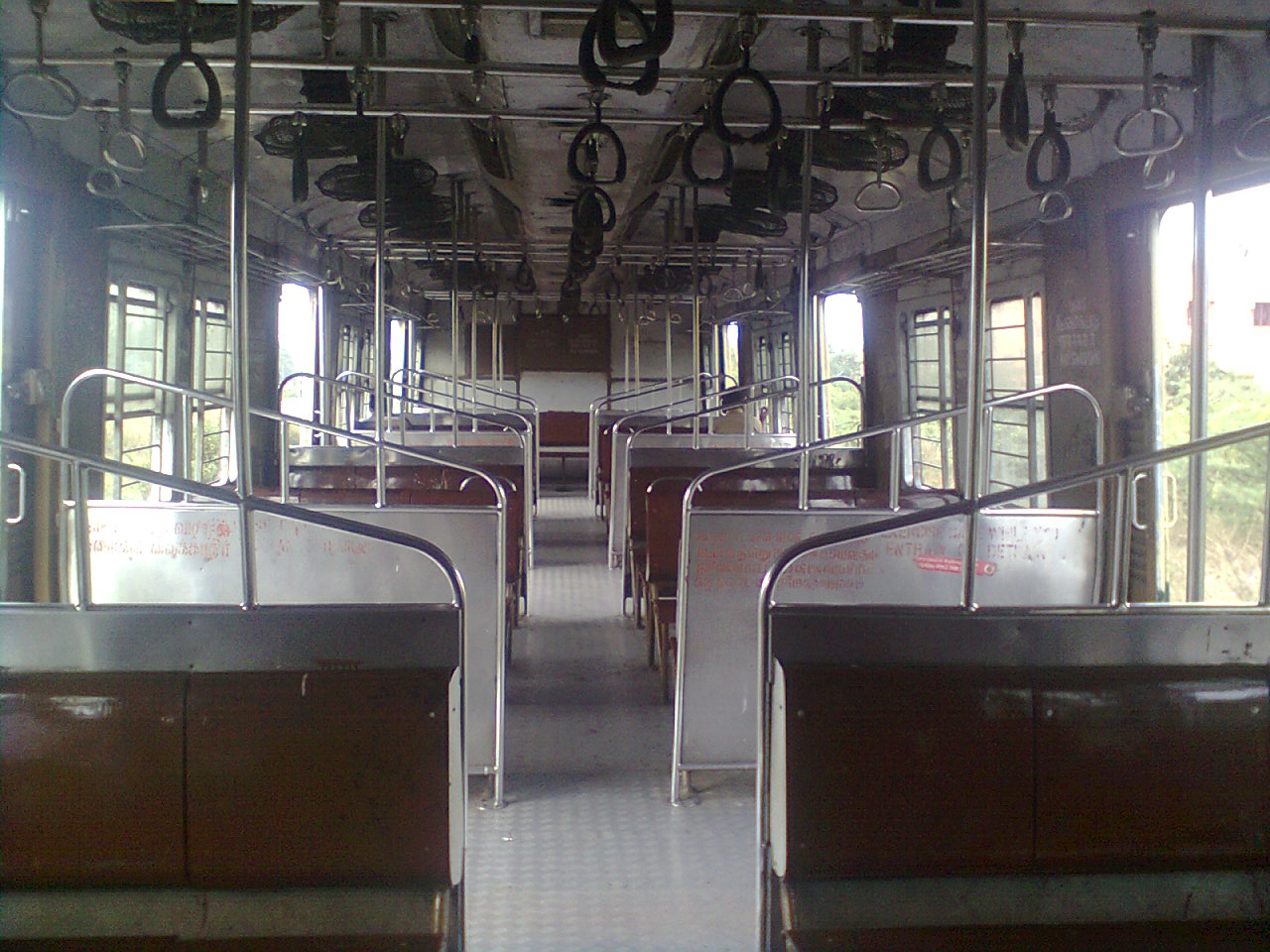
Interior of a non Air Conditioned Chennai Suburban train

The current rolling stock is the broad-gauge WAU-4 built in the Integral Coach Factory of Chennai, to replace the YAU-x (x=1, 2, 3, 4) series meter gauge EMUs that ran till 2004 (on the South Line; they were also built by the ICF), which in turn were made to replace wooden-bodied rakes built by the British manufacturer Metro-Cammell. Electrical equipment and motors were provided by the Japanese manufacturers Toshiba and Hitachi. All trains have a maximum speed of 100 kilometres per hour (62 mph) and typically run with 12-coach formations with exceptions only at MRTS section where only at 9 coaches were operated. They were originally delivered in a cream and brown livery though they have been modernised in recent years. Most notably the brown stripe has been changed to green and the front end design has changed on some trains, as well as the addition of electronic destination displays. Like most suburban trains around India, they have manually operated sliding doors which are often left open. As with most suburban railways around India, trains have designated women's cars and compartments. There have also been women-only trains which run occasionally. Trains do not have gangways/vestibules between cars. Modernised versions of the WAU-4 stock also run on the suburban rail systems of other notable cities like Mumbai, Delhi, Kolkata, Pune and Hyderabad.

The current WAU-4 rolling stock includes ICF rakes, BEML rakes and Siemens rakes (MRVC look-alikes). However, newer 3-Phase Medha EMUs have also been introduced to ply along the routes. On April 19, 2025, after extensive research and planning, Southern Railways introduced Air-Conditioned Suburban Trains to ply on the South (MSB-CGL) Line. These trains are based on the Medha rakes (Similar to Mumbai's AC Local), but with Automatic doors and Air-Conditioned and interconnected (articulated) carriages.

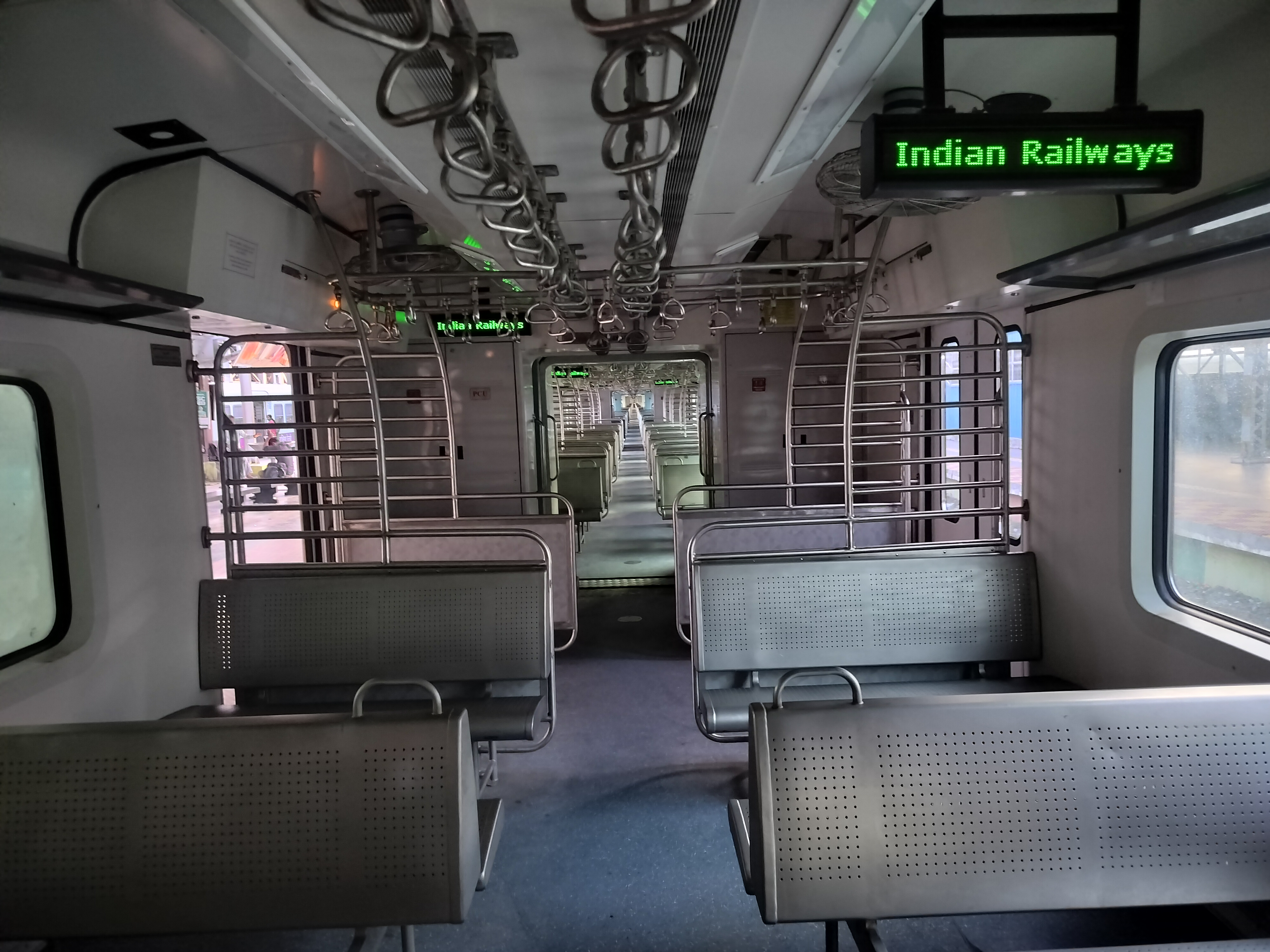
Chennai's Air Conditioned EMU vestibule coach interior view with Automatic doors

== Maintenance ==
The suburban network has EMU car sheds at Avadi, Tambaram and Velachery where maintenance of EMUs is done. Electrical loco sheds of the Southern Railway are located at Royapuram, Arakkonam and Erode where maintenance of electrical locomotives is done. It also has workshops at Perambur Carriage Works and Perambur Loco Works where periodical overhauling of coaching stock is done. Periodical overhauling of electrical rolling stock is done at Perambur Loco Works and the EMU car sheds at Avadi and Tambaram.

== Accidents and incidents ==
On 29 April 2009, a suburban EMU train from Chennai Central suburban terminal was hijacked by an unidentified man, who rammed it with a stationary goods train at Vyasarpadi Jeeva railway station, killing four passengers and injuring 11 others. A major portion of the platform at the station, a footbridge and the railway track were damaged by the collision. The train was scheduled to start at 5:15 am but started at 4:50 am by the perpetrator. The speed of the EMU train at the time of the collision was estimated to be 92 kilometres per hour (57 mph). There were approximately 35 passengers on board at the time of the accident.

=== Accident rates ===
Of the entire stretch of the South line, the Guindy–Chengalpet suburban section, comprising 17 stations, suffers from more fatal accidents with about 30 people a month, peaking at the Chromepet–Tambaram stretch with at least 15 accidents a month as of 2011. Of the 181 people killed on the tracks between Guindy and Chengalpet in 2011, one-fourth were killed on the tracks between Chromepet and Tambaram stations. Almost all of these accidents took place at rail-road crossings. Measures are being taken to prevent these accidents. Several projects are already under way to convert all the rail-road crossings into Subways or overpasses.

== Security ==
In 2013, seven important stations, including MGR Chennai Central, Chennai Egmore, Chennai Beach, Tambaram, Mambalam, Tiruvallur and Basin Bridge Junction, in the suburban section were brought under the Integrated Security System (ISS) of the Southern Railway.

== See also ==
- Transport in Chennai
- Railway stations in Chennai
- Chennai MRTS
- Arakkonam Junction railway station
- Mumbai Suburban Railway
