= Tondiarpet (disambiguation) =

Tondiarpet is a northern neighbourhood of Chennai, India.

Tondiarpet may also refer to these related to the Chennai neighbourhood:

- Tondiarpet division, a revenue division of Chennai district
- Tondiarpet taluk, a subdistrict of Chennai district
- Tondiarpet metro station, Chennai Metro
- Tondiarpet railway station
- Tondiarpet marshalling yard
