= Tondiarpet railway station =

Railway station in Chennai, India

Tondiarpet Tondiarpettai
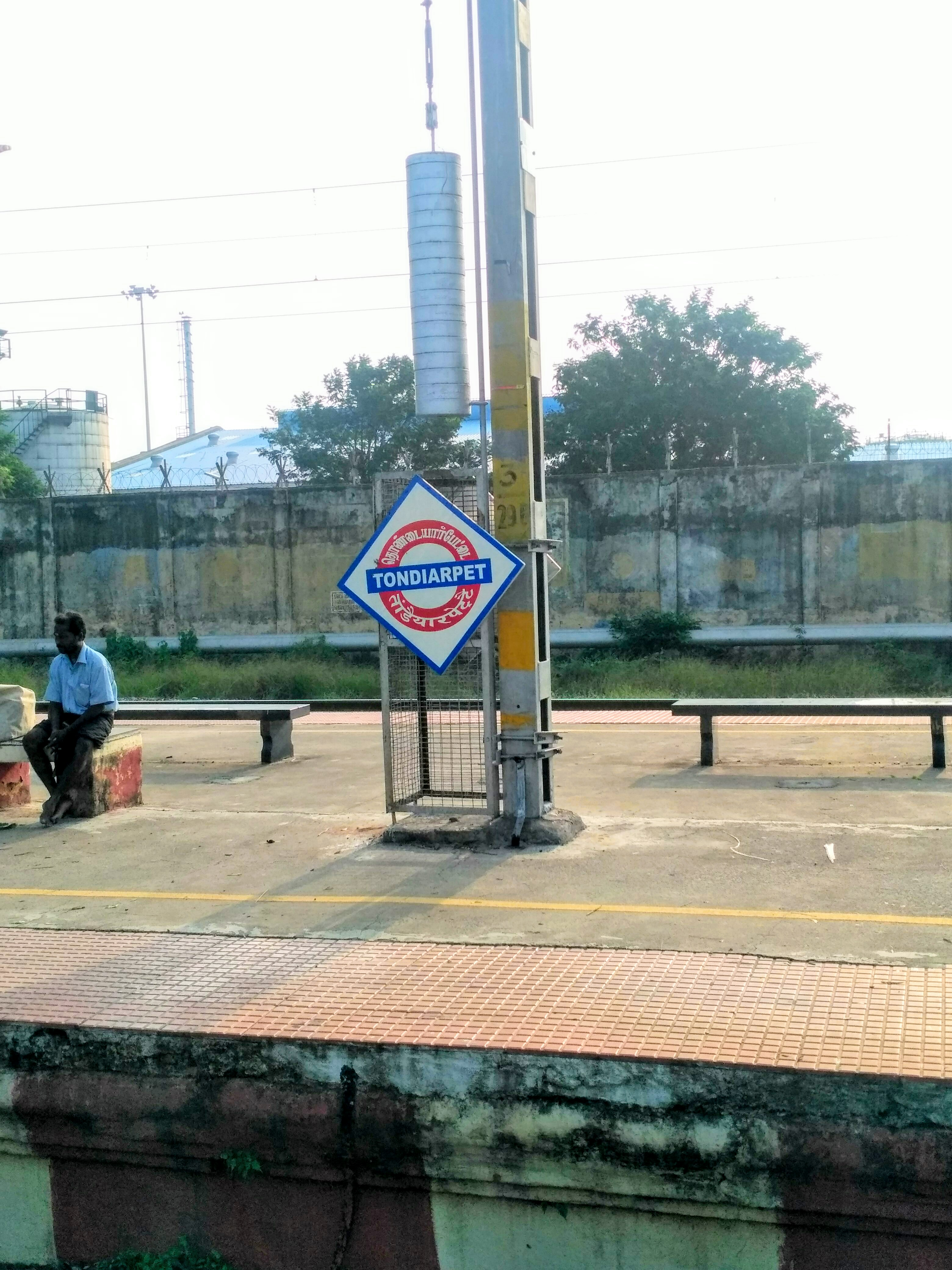

General information
- Location: Tondiarpet, Chennai, Tamil Nadu, India
- Coordinates: 13.1268328°N 80.2814769°E
- System: Indian Railways and Chennai Suburban Railway station
- Owner: Ministry of Railways, Indian Railways
- Line: North line of Chennai Suburban Railway

Construction
- Structure type: Standard on-ground station
- Parking: Available

Other information
- Status: Active
- Station code: TNP
- Fare zone: Southern Railways

History
- Electrified: 13 April 1979
- Former names: South Indian Railway
Location

Tondiarpet railway station is one of the railway station of the Chennai Central–Gummidipoondi section of the Chennai Suburban Railway Network. It serves the neighbourhood of Tondiarpet, a suburb of Chennai, and is located 5 km north of Chennai Central railway station. It has an elevation of 5 m above sea level.

== History ==
The lines at the station were electrified on 13 April 1979, with the electrification of the Chennai Central–Gummidipoondi section.

== Diesel loco shed ==
Tondiarpet diesel loco shed is located to the north of the station. Established in 1972 with the induction of a WDS4B-model diesel locomotive (WDS4B #19202), the shed was built to cater the shunting requirements of the marshalling yard at Tondiarpet, the goods sheds at Royapuram and Salt Cotaurs, and the coaching depot at Basin Bridge in Chennai division. With the augmentation of the fleet of WDS4B locos to 64, they were used in other locations in other divisions. In 2001, these were replaced with the WDM7-model main-line locomotives for passenger and yard shunting work. In April 2007, mainline WDM2-model locomotives were additionally inducted for hauling goods. As of June 2010, the total stock at the shed is 66, including 33 WDS4B locomotives, 4 WDS4D locomotives, 15 WDM2 locomotives and 14 WDM7 locomotives. In 2005, the shed registered the maximum holding of 74 locomotives. The shed has a total area of 75,000 sq m, including a covered area of 6,652 sq m, has a capacity of 50 locomotives. The shed employs about 378 persons.

== See also ==
- Chennai Suburban Railway
- Railway stations in Chennai
