= Ranipet railway station =

Railway station in Tamil Nadu, India

Ranipet

General information
- Location: Ranipet, Tamil Nadu, India
- Coordinates: 12.9307°N 79.3268°E
- System: Indian Railways station
- Owner: Indian Railways
- Operator: South Central Railway Zone
- Line: Active
- Platforms: 6
- Tracks: 12

Other information
- Status: Active
- Station code: RPT
- Zone(s): South
- Division(s): Chennai
- Website: http://www.indianrailways.gov.in
Location
- Location within Tamil Nadu

Ranipettai railway station, station code: RPT (TAMIL: இராணிப்பேட்டை தொடர்வண்டி நிலையம்), is a terminal railway station which falls under the Southern Railway zone of the Indian Railways. It belongs to Chennai division. It is the oldest railway station in India. It serves the cities of Ranipet, Arcot and Walajapet.

It is constructed under British rule in 1858. It was constructed as a siding railway station at that time. This railway station is used to transport goods from Ranippettai town to Royapuram railway station. Currently this station is used as a goods terminal for Ranipettai.

== History ==
It is the first train that ran in India. Later, India's first passenger train started running in 1853 from Bori Bunder To thane. Now Royapuram railway station is the oldest surviving railway station in India.

== Current situation ==
Train services were stopped in Ranippettai railway station after gauge conversion from metre gauge to broad gauge due to poor patronage. There are plans to operate this railway station as a freight terminal due to increasing demands of cargo movement to nearby railway stations around Ranippettai town. But plans are made by railways to operate this railway station as a goods terminal. On 20 January 2021, this railway station becomes operational once again by transporting goods from Ranipet railway station to Dwarapudi in Andhra Pradesh. This railway station became operational after 25 years.
