= Korukkupet railway station =

Railway station in Tamil Nadu, India

Korukkupet Korukkupettai
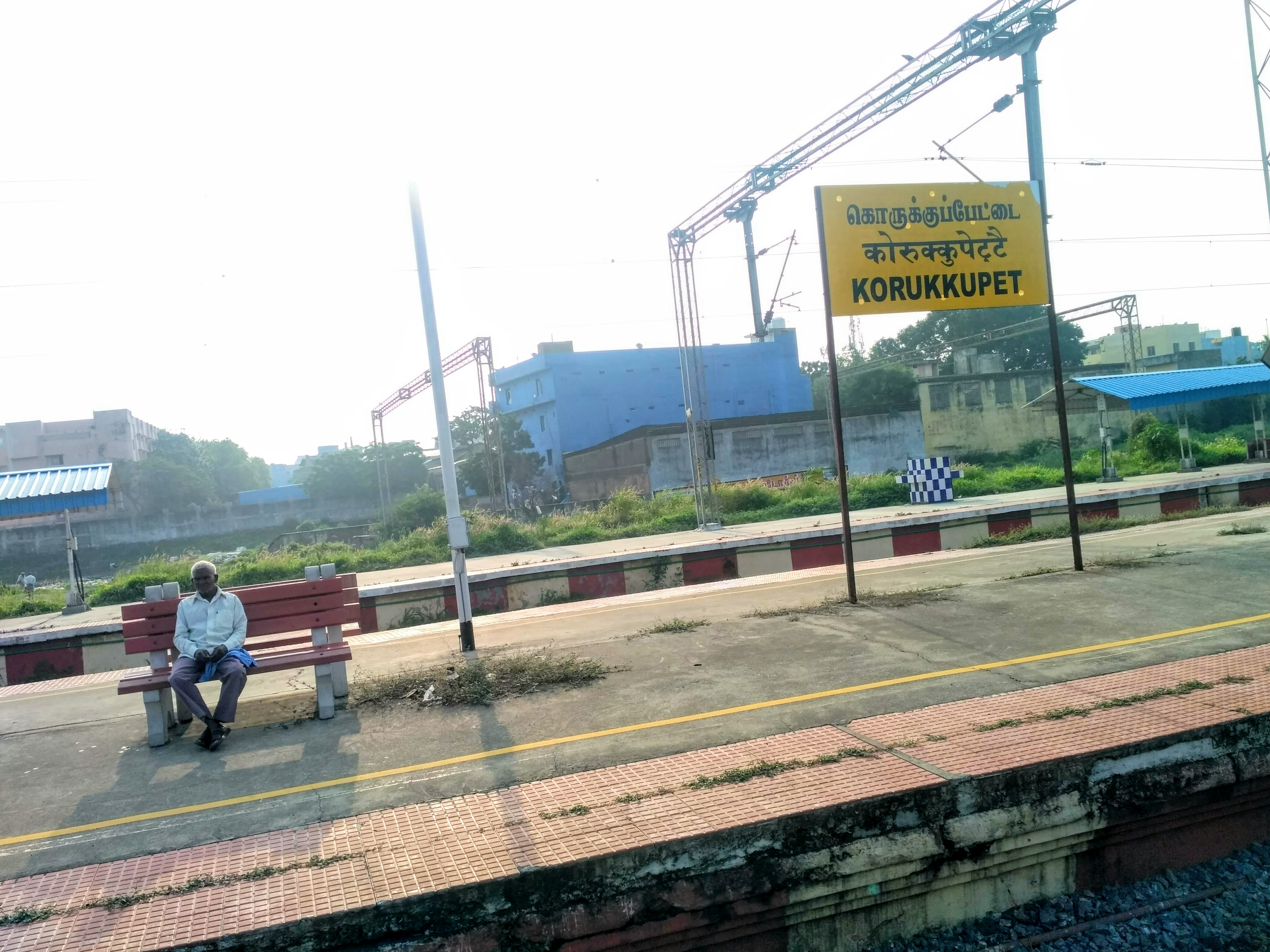

General information
- Location: Korukkupet, Chennai, Tamil Nadu, India
- Coordinates: 13°7′14″N 80°16′42″E
- System: Indian Railways and Chennai Suburban Railway station
- Owner: Ministry of Railways, Indian Railways
- Line: North line of Chennai Suburban Railway
- Platforms: 3
- Tracks: 5

Construction
- Structure type: Standard on-ground station
- Parking: Available

Other information
- Station code: KOK
- Fare zone: Southern Railways

History
- Electrified: 13 April 1979
- Former names: South Indian Railway
Location
- Location within India Location within Tamil Nadu

Korukkupet railway station is one of the railway station of the Chennai Central–Gummidipoondi section of the Chennai Suburban Railway Network. It serves the neighbourhood of Korukkupet, a suburb of Chennai, and is located 4 km north of Chennai Central railway station. It has an elevation of 7 m above sea level.

== History ==
Korukkupet railway station is the first railway station located north of the diamond junction of the city's railway network. The lines at the station were electrified on 13 April 1979, with the electrification of the Chennai Central–Gummidipoondi section.

== Developments ==
In 2007, a road overbridge project to replace the level crossing No. 1 was sanctioned at a cost of ₹ 140 million. Work commenced in 2009, and is expected to be completed by end 2012.

However, the station lacks several basic facilities.

== See also ==
- Chennai Suburban Railway
- Railway stations in Chennai
