= Minjur railway station =

Railway station in Tamil Nadu, India

Minjur

General information
- Location: Minjur, Chennai, Tamil Nadu, India
- Coordinates: 13°16′54″N 80°15′36″E
- System: Indian Railways and Chennai Suburban Railway station
- Owner: Ministry of Railways, Indian Railways
- Line: North line of Chennai Suburban Railway

Construction
- Structure type: Standard on-ground station
- Parking: Available

Other information
- Station code: MJR
- Fare zone: Southern Railways

History
- Electrified: 13 April 1979
- Former names: South Indian Railway

Passengers
- 2013: 20,000
Location

Minjur railway station is one of the railway stations of the Chennai Central–Gummidipoondi section of the Chennai Suburban Railway Network. It serves the neighbourhood of Minjur, a suburb of Chennai, and is located 26 km north of Chennai Central railway station. It has an elevation of 8 m above sea level.

== History ==
The lines at the station were electrified on 13 April 1979, with the electrification of the Chennai Central–Gummidipoondi section.

== Traffic ==
About 20,000 people uses the station every day.

== See also ==
- Chennai Suburban Railway
- Railway stations in Chennai
