= Arakonam–Jolarpettai Express =

The Arakkonam–Jolarpettai MEMU Express is an Indian daily train that runs between Jolarpettai and Arakkonam. The train departs from Arakkonam Junction railway station daily at 18:05 and arrives at Jolarpettai Junction railway station at 21:15. This train stops at 14 stations, importantly Sholinghur, Walajah Road, Katpadi Junction, Ambur, and Vaniyambadi. This train was referred to as the "workers' special" during the COVID-19 pandemic. It is mostly used by workers commuting from Chennai Ambattur, Avadi, Thiruvallur, Arakkonam, Katpadi.

This train operates with train no. 16085 in the up direction towards Jolarpettai and no. 16086 in the down direction towards Arakkonam Junction.

== History ==
The Arakkonam-Jolarpettai MEMU service was introduced on 22 May 2000.^{[2]} This MEMU was the first to be introduced for long-distance routes in Southern Railway.

== Coaches ==
This train carries an 8 car MEMU rack OF ICF or RCF. The train has rake sharing with 66011 Chennai central-Arakkonam MEMU Express. Even though it is classified as Express, this train stops in many stations. According to railway rules, trains running more than 200 km are included in express category. This train travels only 146 km, but collects express (higher) fares.

== See also ==
- Yelagiri Express
- Brindavan Express
