= Royapuram railway station =

Railway station in Chennai, Tamil Nadu, India

Royapuram
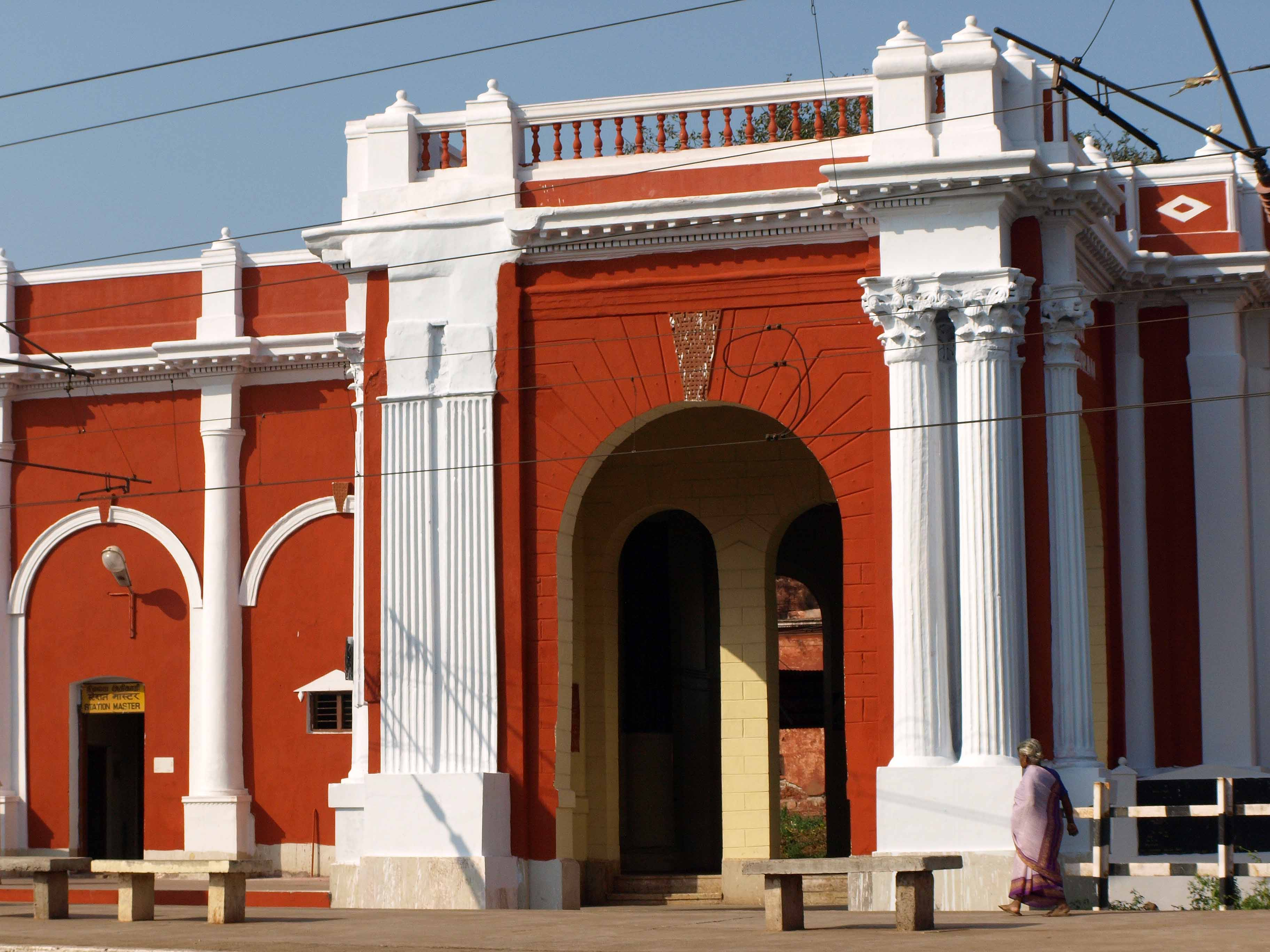
- Royapuram station

General information
- Coordinates: 13.10403°N 80.29366°E
- System: Indian Railways and Chennai Suburban Railway station
- Owner: Ministry of Railways, Indian Railways
- Lines: North, West, West North and West South lines of Chennai Suburban Railway
- Platforms: 4
- Tracks: 26

Construction
- Structure type: Standard on-ground station
- Parking: Available

Other information
- Status: Active
- Station code: RPM
- Fare zone: Southern Railways

History
- Opened: 28 June 1856
- Electrified: 9 August 1979
- Former names: Madras and Southern Mahratta Railway
Location
- Location within India Location within Tamil Nadu

Royapuram railway station (station code: RPM) is a railway station at Royapuram, on the Chennai Beach–Walajapet section of the Chennai Suburban Railway network in Chennai, India. It is the second oldest railway station currently operational in India after Howrah railway station situated in Howrah, West Bengal (the original structures of the two older stations, Bombay and Thane, are no longer operational) and the first railway station of South India. The first train of South India started operating in June 1856 from Royapuram railway station. The station also remained the headquarters of the Madras and Southern Mahratta Railway till 1922, when the headquarters was shifted to Egmore. Since the original structures of Bombay and Thane stations no longer exist, Royapuram station remains the oldest railway station in the entire subcontinent.

Owing to lack of maintenance, Royapuram railway station building was degraded to a dilapidated condition over the decades. One end of the station, which was formerly used as a military platform, became a playground with most of the area covered with overgrown scrub vegetation. The other end of the station is being used for the transport of goods trains and the platform adjacent the main building is utilised for passenger trains. In 2005, the building was refurbished at an estimated cost of ₹ 3.5 million and was re-opened to the public on 2 October 2005 by the then union minister of state for railways, R. Velu. It is the oldest surviving railway station structures of the Indian Railways, as well as the Indian subcontinent.

The Justice Padmanabhan committee, constituted by the Tamil Nadu state government, has identified the station as among the 800 heritage structures. As per the city's list of heritage structures, the station is under the Grade I category.

== History ==
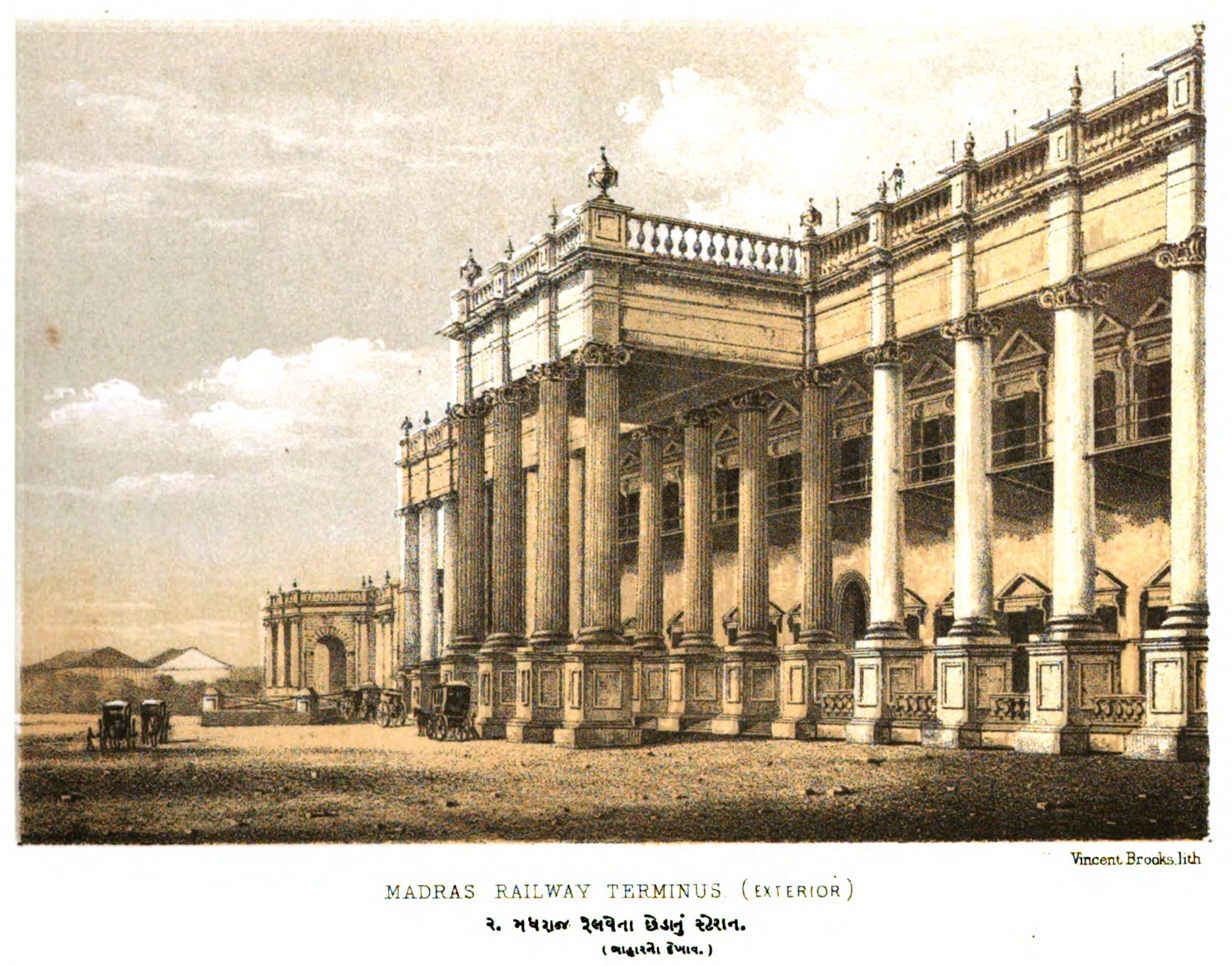
The original structure c. 1870

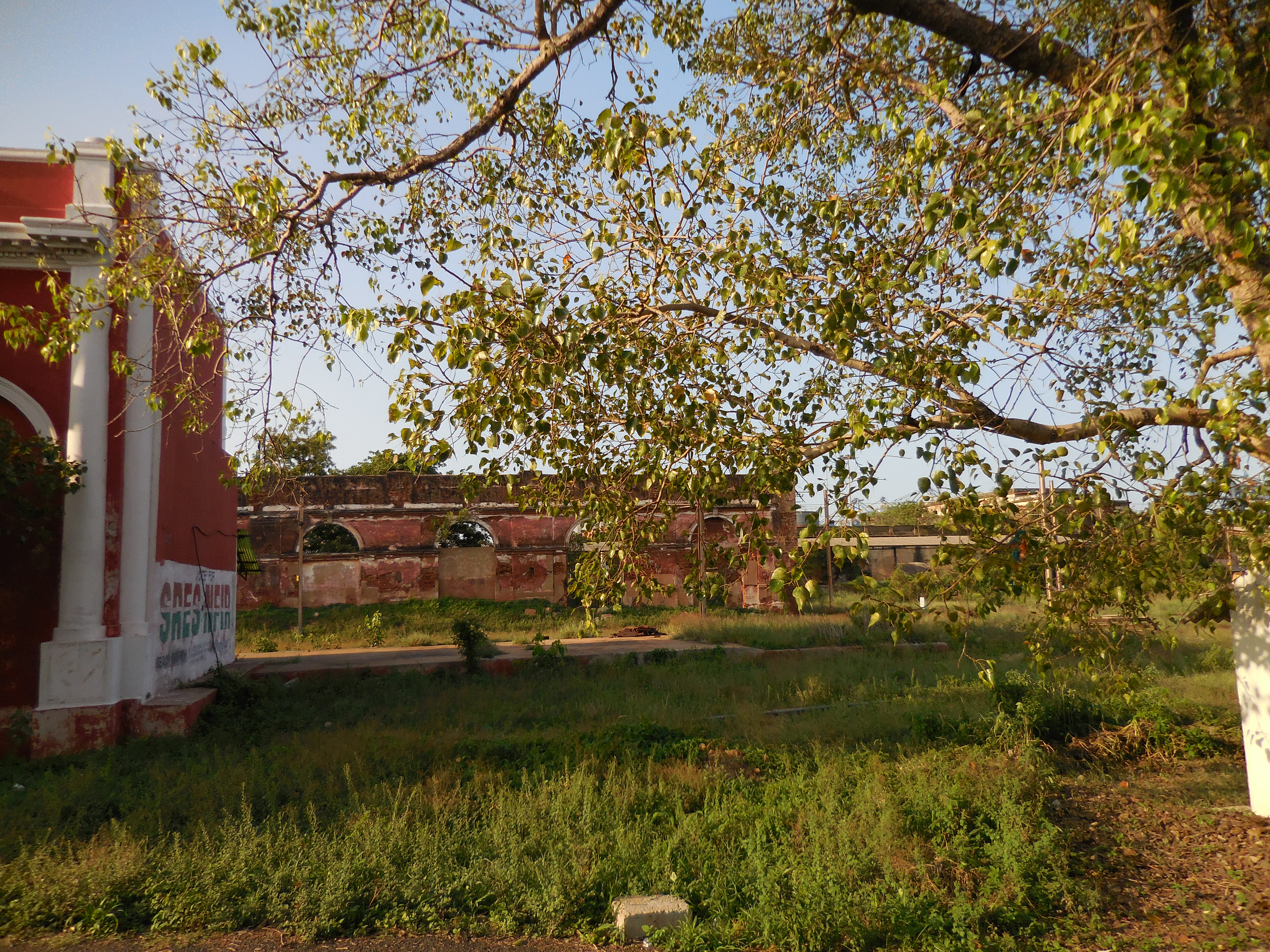
Ruins of the original structures at the station

Royapuram railway station is the place from where the laying down of the second railway line of the South Asia commenced in 1853. The idea of a railway in South India long predated any other railway lines in the Indian subcontinent when a railway line for Madras was proposed in 1832. In the early 1840s, about 15 years after Stephenson's steam engine undertook that historic Stockton–Darlington journey with its passenger coach, laying of a railway line in South India was discussed in London. In 1845, the Madras Railway Company was formed and the plan was still under discussion. Four years later, the Great India Peninsula Company was formed in 1849, which built a 21-mile-long route from Bori Bunder (later the Victoria Terminus) in Bombay to Thane, becoming India's first railway line opened for traffic on 16 April 1853. With the Madras Railway Company reconstituting itself in 1849, the plans for a railway line in the south was revived further to the efforts by the mercantile community of Madras Presidency, which lobbied for rail connectivity. Work on the southern line began in 1853 and the railway line was extended from Royapuram (Madras) to Arcot, then titular capital of the Nawab of the Carnatic (the present day Walajapet, near Ranipet in Tamil Nadu). Royapuram was selected as the location for the new station as it was on the edge of a settlement of British traders and natives near Fort St. George. With the opening of the main terminus, the Royapuram station, on 28 June 1856 by the then Governor Lord Harris, the railway line was opened for traffic on 1 July 1856. On the inaugural day, two services—Royapuram to Ambur and Royapuram to Tiruvallur—were operated. The first train, manufactured by Simpson and Company, started its journey with the Governor and 300 European people from Royapuram to Walajapet and a stately dinner was arranged in Ambur. The second train carried Indian invitees to a shorter distance till "Triveloor" (the present day Thiruvallur). However, it is not known whether dinner was arranged for the people in the second train.

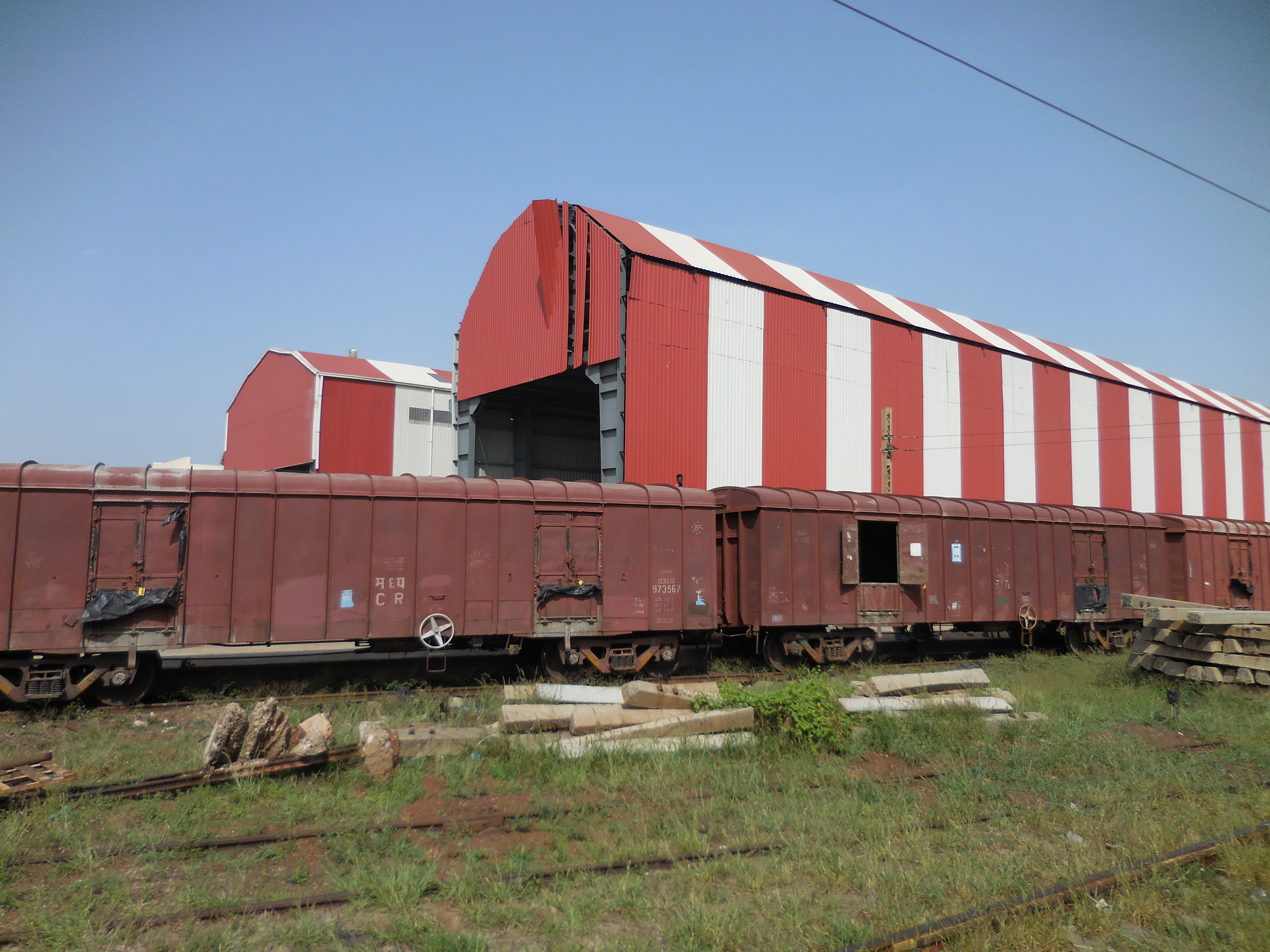
Loco shed at the Royapuram railway station

On 6 September 1856, The Illustrated London News depicted the regal inauguration of the palatial railway station in Madras, in which the journal also described the second railway line in India:

As the train proceeded across the arid plain of the Carnatic, it brought to view the counless number ... who thronged the route ... The train dashed by the masses of colours, here clustered by a bridge, there collected under the deep shade of a tope, crowded round a station house, or fringing the edges of a cutting, cheering loudly as the train flew by them. Now and then too, a hearty laugh broke forth when in passing some pasture ground, the lazy cattle, startled by the rushing shriek of the train, flew frantically away, sometimes followed by the scared herdsman himself, who, thinking that the fiery-fiend whom he saw approaching might crush him also, took to his heels with all his speed.

William Adelpi Tracey designed the heritage building of the Royapuram Railway station. According to the journal, Captain Barnett Fort described the rooms in the Royapuram station as being "very elegant and most superbly furnished with handsome punkahs & c." Governor Lord Harris, in his speech, congratulated the Madras Railway company, its manager Major Jenkins and all who had worked on the railway and said that the cost of £5,500 a mile was well worth the investment and looked forward to equally expeditious completion of the additional 450 miles of track to the west coast, a little south of Calicut.

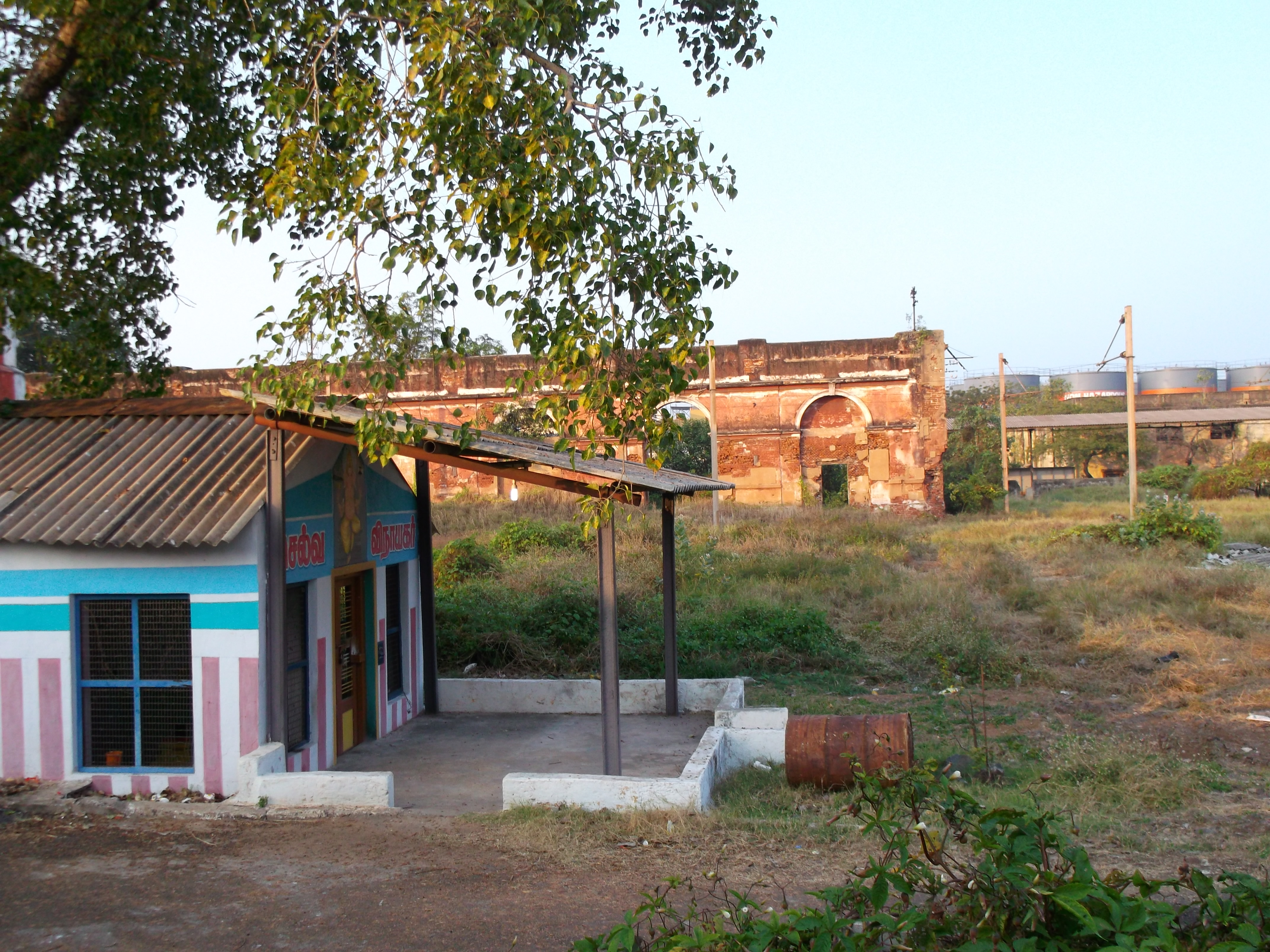
A small temple at the station, with the heritage buildings at the background

Since then, Royapuram was the only railway station in the city for about 17 years till Madras Central Station became functional in 1873. From 1873, trains towards the northern regions of the country were operated from Chennai Central and those towards the southern regions of the state were operated from Royapuram station.

With the development of the Chennai Port, the cargoes from the port were transported via Royapuram station. This resulted in Egmore railway station becoming the terminus for southbound trains in 1907. On 9 August 1979, the lines at the station were electrified with the electrification of the Chennai Beach–Basin Bridge section. The lines from Royapuram to Korukkupet were electrified on 26 September 1987. With the Korukkupet railway station becoming functional as the container terminus, the Royapuram station started functioning as one of the suburban stations in the Chennai Beach-Arokkonam section of the Chennai Suburban Railway network. A building adjacent to the station built around the same time as that of the station, which was functioning as the headquarters of the Madras Railway Company, was demolished a few years ago.

== Layout ==
Royapuram railway station ranks second in India in terms of space availability with 246,000 sq m, next to the Howrah station in Kolkata. The station, with an elevation of 7 m above sea level, is 1,015 m long and 420 m wide and covers about 72 acres. Located at about 2 km from Chennai Central station, the station has about 28 tracks. An island platform serves the suburban traffic in the station. The station building, marked by arches, ionic pillars and high-rise ceilings, is a heritage building. However, the station has only 450 m track length, against the 1,000 m needed for a terminal. The station has a goods shed attached to it.

== Developments ==
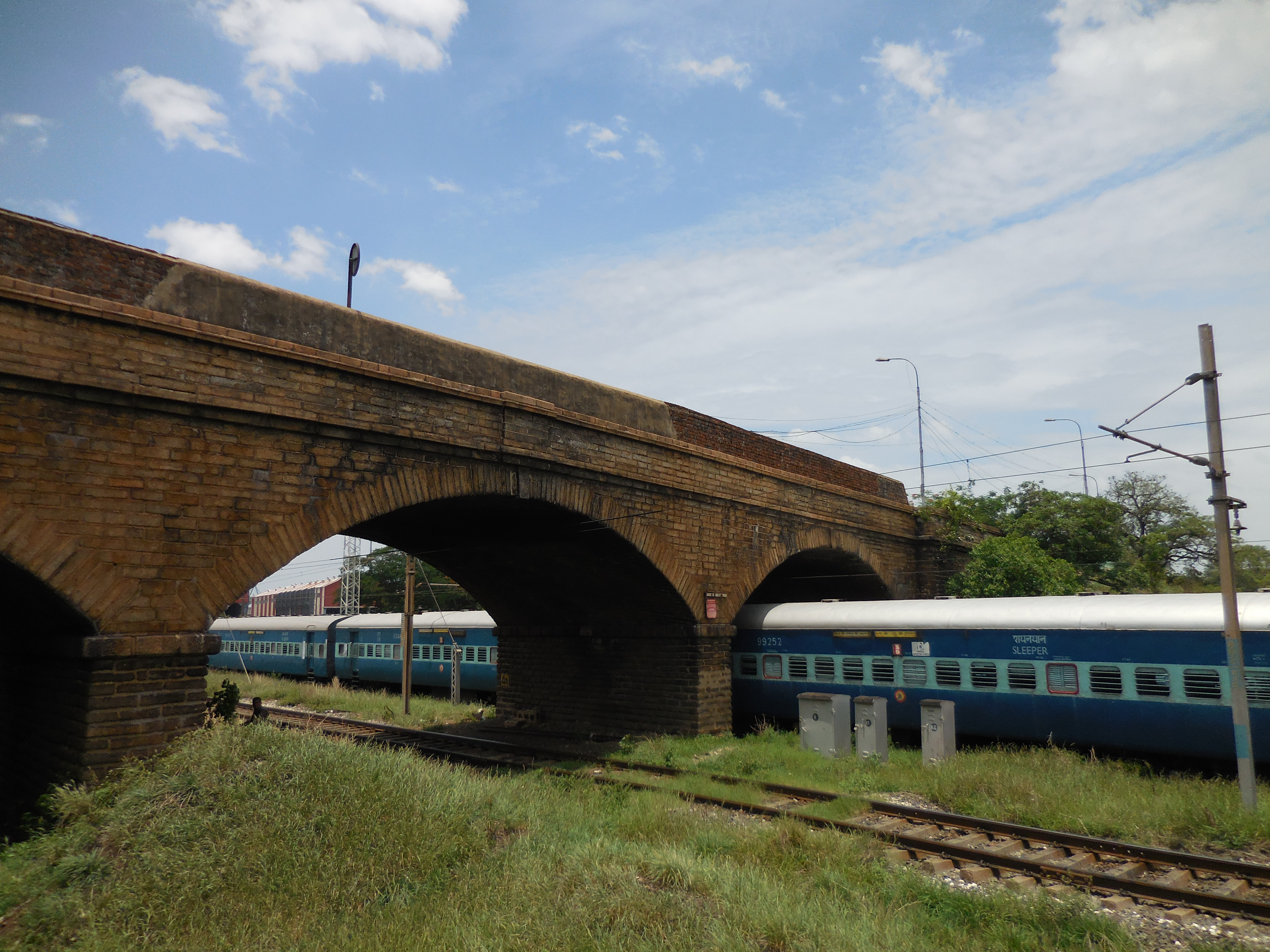
Arched road over-bridge near the western end of the station

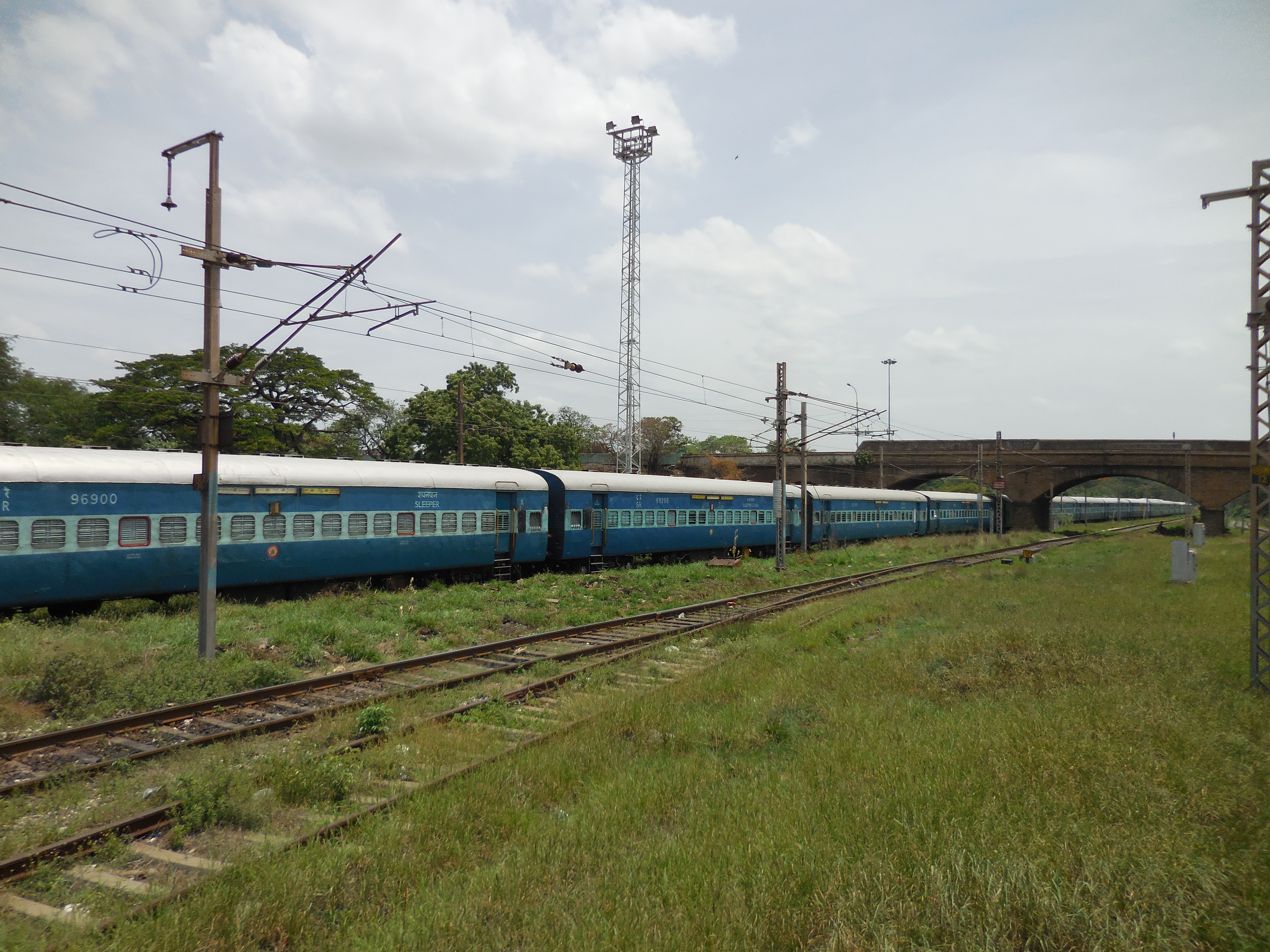
A view of the arched over-bridge towards west

In 2006, the Southern Railway planned to lease a portion of the terminus to the corporate sector for developing cement and fertilizer depots. When this move was opposed, the railway allotted ₹ 155.5 million for locomotive maintenance shed in 2007. The foundation stone for the electric loco shed, which will be the Southern Railway's third one after Arakkonam and Erode, was laid on 25 January 2007. The loco shed was planned with an initial capacity of 50 locos, which would be augmented to 100 and then to 150 in phases with an investment of ₹ 450 million, and would have an inspection bay for undertaking scheduled inspections and lifting bay for undertaking both minor and major repairs. A service building for maintenance of various equipments of locos was planned, which will have testing and overhauling facilities. In addition, the loco shed was to have a stores depot for day-to-day maintenance. The plan also included a foot overbridge and a godown facility for grains. The project was targeted for completion by June 2008. However, this project is yet to be materialised.

Southern Railway, which initially planned to make the station a hub for freight operations, has now started a feasibility study to convert the heritage structure into a passenger terminal. The station has large swathes of land spread across 72 acres, in which 16 platforms can be constructed. Parking bays for both public and private transportation can be created in north and south blocks. Presently, 16 long-distance express trains bound for northern, eastern and western parts of the country are passing through the railway station and electric multiple units to Gummidipoondi and Arakkonam are operated from Chennai Beach railway station, along the same line. There are demands from the public to develop the station into the third terminal of the city after Central and Egmore.

== See also ==
- Chennai Suburban Railway
- Railway stations in Chennai
- Heritage structures in Chennai
