= Kanchipuram railway station =

Railway station in Tamil Nadu, India

Kanchipuram

General information
- Location: Konnerikuppam, Kanchipuram, Kanchipuram district, Tamil Nadu; India
- Coordinates: 12.8484°N 79.7051°E
- Elevation: 85 metres (279 ft)
- System: Indian Railways and Chennai Suburban Railway station
- Owner: Indian Railways
- Operator: Southern Railway zone
- Platforms: 3
- Tracks: 3
- Connections: Auto rickshaw stand

Construction
- Structure type: Standard (on ground station)
- Parking: Yes

Other information
- Status: Functioning
- Station code: CJ
- Zone(s): Southern Railway
- Division(s): MGR Chennai

History
- Opened: 2004; 22 years ago
Location
- Location within Tamil Nadu Location within India

Kanchipuram railway station (station code: CJ) is an NSG–4 category Indian railway station in Chennai railway division of Southern Railway zone. It serves as the principal railway station of the temple city of Kanchipuram in Tamil Nadu.

== History ==
The station code can be retraced to a time as early as the 1860s when a 3 ft 6in wide gauge line was laid between Arakkonam and Kanchipuram (then known as Conjeevaram – thus CJ) by Indian Tramway Company. Southbound services towards Chengalpattu were then inaugurated, much later in the 1880s, when the Chengalpattu–Walajabad section was commissioned, after which in 1891, Arakkonam–Chengalpattu and Chengalpattu–Arakkonam passenger services began, post conversion of the entire section to broad gauge. Although, the resident folklore of Kanchipuram are more accustomed to calling this station as "New railway station", the station code CJ has been taken from the old railway station, about 1.5 km away, that is now referred to as "Kanchipuram East" – CJE.

== Location and layout ==
Kanchipuram railway station is located at the entrance to the town on the Western banks of the Ponneri Eri. Situated about 2.6 kilometres from the entry arch of Kanchipuram on the Chennai–Bangalore highway, it is near the Kanchi Sri Ekambareswarar Temple and the nearest airport from here is the Chennai International Airport, located at a distance of 72 km from the station.

The station is on the Arakkonam–Chengalpattu branch line which is a major route for local and suburban traffic.

Kanchipuram railway station is one of the stations in the Chennai Suburban Railway on the Chennai Beach–Tambaram—Chengalpattu–kanchipuram–Tirumalpur–Arakkonam route (South-West line) now fully electrified and commissioning as a circular route with two circular service as electric multiple unit running in each direction.
