= V. O. C. Nagar railway station =

Railway station in Chennai, India

V. O. C. Nagar
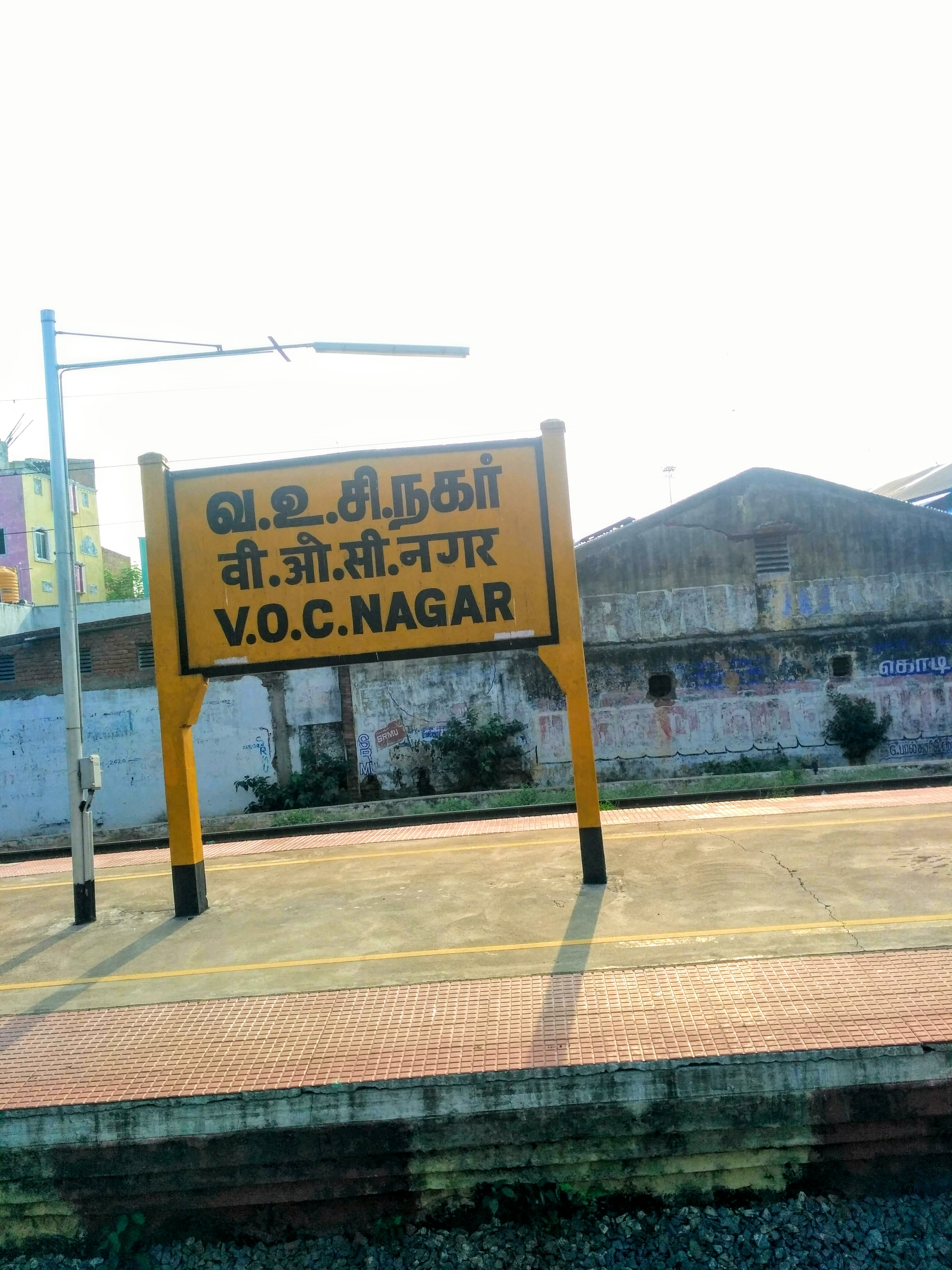
- V.O.C Nagar Railway Station

General information
- Location: Tondiarpet, Chennai, Tamil Nadu, India
- Coordinates: 13°8′28″N 80°17′16″E
- System: Indian Railways and Chennai Suburban Railway station
- Owner: Ministry of Railways, Indian Railways
- Line: North line of Chennai Suburban Railway

Construction
- Structure type: Standard on-ground station
- Parking: Available

Other information
- Station code: VOC
- Fare zone: Southern Railways

History
- Electrified: 13 April 1979
- Former names: South Indian Railway
Location

V. O. C. Nagar railway station is one of the railway stations of the Chennai Central–Gummidipoondi section of the Chennai Suburban Railway. It was previously known as Tondiarpet Marshalling Yard railway station. It serves the neighbourhood of Tondiarpet, a suburb of Chennai, and is located 6 km north of Chennai Central railway station. It has an elevation of 5 m above sea level.

The railway station is mostly used by railway employees since it is very close to many railway establishments. This station is mostly visited by rail fans for rail fanning since it has a big railway yard. Chennai Port Trust ground is close to this railway station. However, it lacks several basic amenities.

== History ==
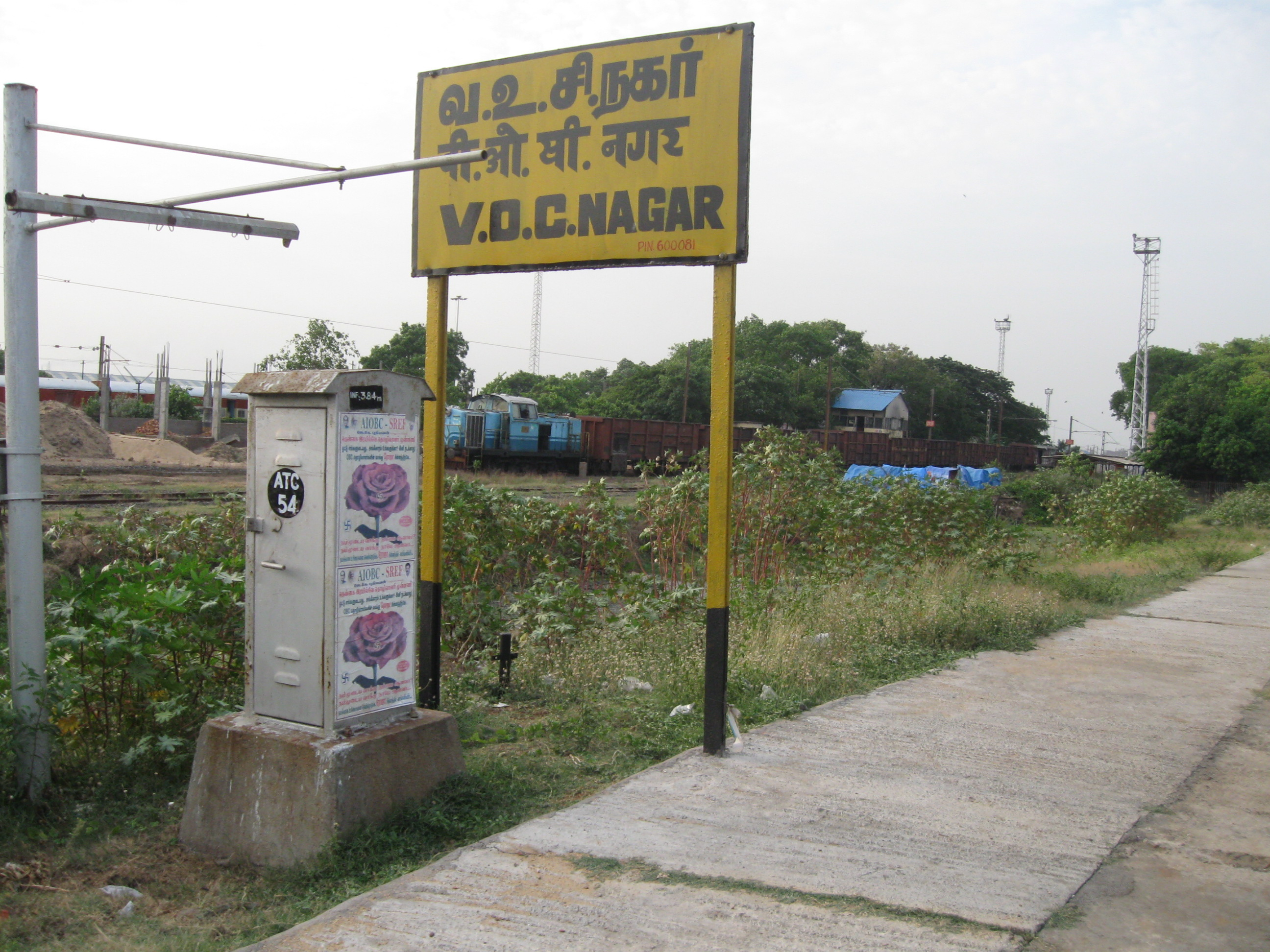

The railway station was initially known as Tondiarpet marshalling yard railway station and later renamed to V. O. C. Nagar. The lines at the station were electrified on 13 April 1979, with the electrification of the Chennai Central–Gummidipoondi section.

== See also ==
- Chennai Suburban Railway
- Railway stations in Chennai
