= Tada railway station =

Railway Junction in Andhra Pradesh, India

General information
- Location: Tada, Andhra Pradesh
- Coordinates: 13.5889°N 80.03608°E
- Elevation: 10 metres (33 ft)
- System: rail station
- Owner: Indian Railways
- Operator: Southern Railway zone
- Line: Chennai–Gudur
- Platforms: 3 side platforms

Construction
- Parking: Available
- Accessible: Yes

Other information
- Status: Functional
- Station code: TADA
- Zone(s): Southern Railway zone
- Division(s): Chennai
Location
- Location within Andhra Pradesh
- Interactive map

Tada railway station (station code: TADA) is a railway station located in Tada, Tirupati district in the Indian state of Andhra Pradesh. It is located on the Gudur–Chennai section of the Howrah-Chennai main line and comes under the jurisdiction of Chennai railway division of Southern Railway zone. It is classified as a NSG-6 station (annual revenue less than 10 million rupees and less than 1 million passengers handled).
