= Akkampeta railway station =

Railway Junction in Andhra Pradesh, India

General information
- Location: Akkampeta, Tirupati district, Andhra Pradesh
- Coordinates: 13.6481°N 80.0189°E
- Elevation: 10 metres (33 ft)
- System: rail station
- Owner: Indian Railways
- Operator: Southern Railway zone
- Line: Chennai–Gudur
- Platforms: 2 side platforms

Construction
- Parking: Available
- Accessible: Yes

Other information
- Status: Functional
- Station code: AKAT
- Zone(s): Southern Railway zone
- Division(s): Chennai
Location
- Location within Andhra Pradesh
- Interactive map

Akkampeta railway station (station code: AKAT) is a railway station located in Akkampeta, Tirupati district in the Indian state of Andhra Pradesh. It is located on the Gudur–Chennai section of the Howrah-Chennai main line and comes under the jurisdiction of Chennai railway division of Southern Railway zone. It is classified as a HG-2 station (annual revenue between 0.5 and 5 million rupees and between 0.1 and 0.3 million passengers handled).
