= Vaniyambadi railway station =

Railway station in the town of Vaniyambadi

Vaniyambadi வாணியம்பாடி
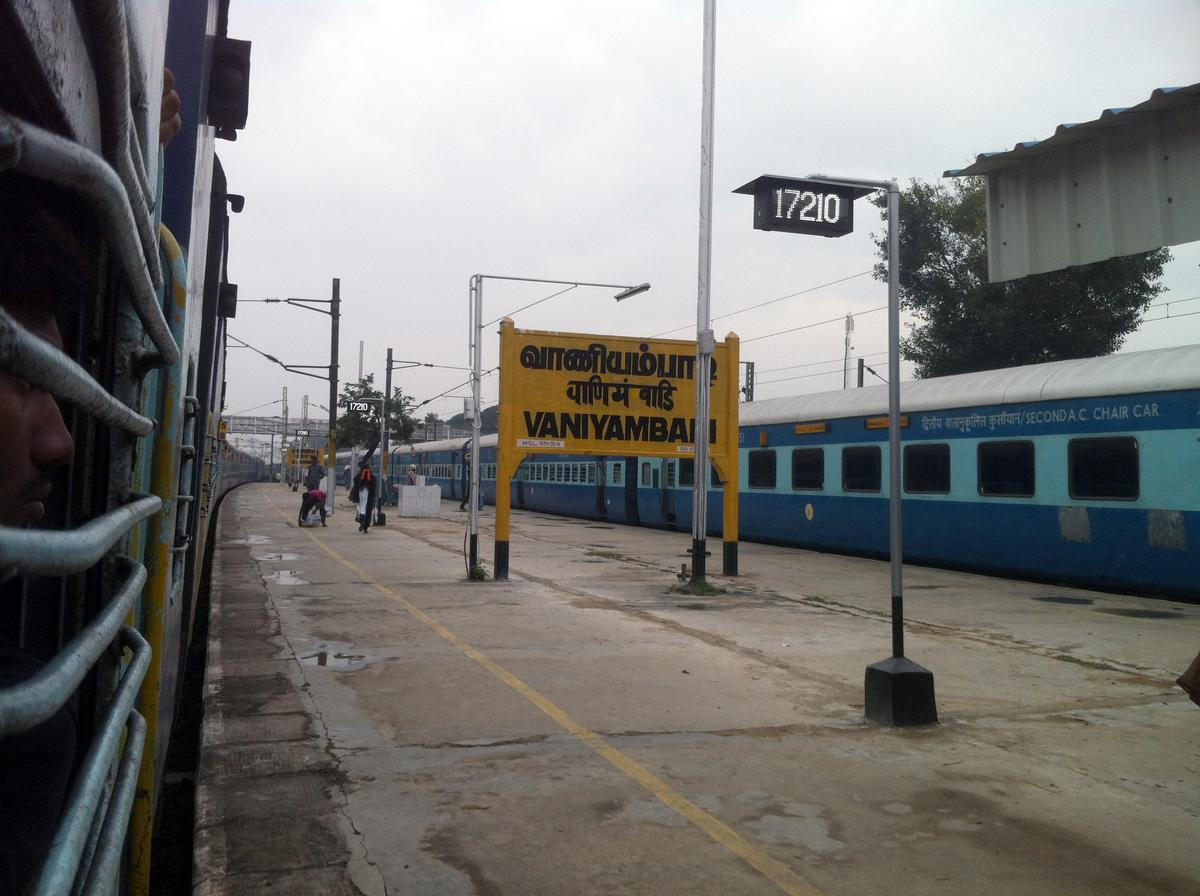
- Vaniyambadi railway station board

General information
- Location: India
- Coordinates: 12.67849°N 78.62165°E
- Elevation: 355 metres (1,165 ft)
- System: Indian Railways station
- Owner: Indian Railways
- Line: Chennai Central–Bangalore City line
- Platforms: 3

Other information
- Status: Active
- Station code: VN
- Zone(s): Southern Railway zone
- Division(s): Chennai

Services
Preceding station	Indian Railways	Following station
Kettandapatti towards Bangalore City	Chennai Central–Bangalore City line	Vinnamangalam towards Chennai Central
Location
- Location within Tamil Nadu Location within India

Chennai Central MMC
— Jolarpet

Vaniyambadi railway station (station code: VN) is an NSG–5 category Indian railway station in Chennai railway division of Southern Railway zone. It is a railway station in the town of Vaniyambadi, Tamil Nadu, India.

The station is close to a bus stand.

It belongs to the southern railway Chennai division. The station is located 198 Km from Chennai.

Twenty-five trains visit this station.

== Design ==
It has three platforms. The second platform is used for trains toward Katpadi Junction, Arakkonam Junction, and Chennai Central railway station. The third platform is used for trains toward Jolarpettai Junction.

== Crash ==
On February 12, 1981, three trains -- Trivandrum Mail, Yercaud Express and a goods train were involved in a crash that left 20 dead and at least 50 injured. According to news reports, the couplings of a goods train had snapped and the loose wagons slipped onto a second line. The Trivandrum Mail (No 20 Madras Mail) crashed into the wagons and derailed.

== See also ==
- List of railway stations in India
