= Venkatanarasimharajuvaripeta railway station =

Railway station in Andhra Pradesh, India

Venkatanarasimharajuvaripeta

General information
- Location: Thadukupeta, Chittoor district, Andhra Pradesh; India
- Coordinates: 13°16′14″N 79°34′54″E
- System: Indian Railways station
- Line: Renigunta–Arakkonam
- Platforms: 2
- Tracks: 5 ft 6 in (1,676 mm) broad gauge

Construction
- Structure type: Standard (on ground station)
- Parking: Available

Other information
- Status: Functioning
- Station code: VKZ
- Zone(s): Southern Railway
Location
- Location within Andhra Pradesh Location within India

Venkatanarasimharajuvaripeta railway station or Venkata Narasimha Rajuvaripet railway station or V N Rajuvaripeta railway station (station code: VKZ) is a railway station in Andhra Pradesh on the border with Tamil Nadu, India. It is on the Renigunta–Arakkonam section of Southern Railway, with the distinction of having the second longest name among all stations on the Indian Railways, following the renaming of Chennai Central to Puratchi Thalaivar Dr. M.G. Ramachandran Central railway station in Chennai, Tamil Nadu.

== Trains ==
In railway parlance, it is a flag station. It is unsignalled and passenger trains halt here, but mail trains and express trains do not halt here.

== See also ==
- Ib – the railway station in Odisha on Indian Railways with the shortest name.
