= Kettandapatti railway station =

Coordinates: 13.125028°N 79.966079°E

Kettandapati

General information
- Location: Thekkupattu, Tamil Nadu

Construction
- Parking: Available

Other information
- Status: Functional
- Station code: KDY
- Zone(s): Southern Railway zone
- Division(s): Chennai
Location
- Location within Tamil Nadu

Kettandapati (station code: KDY) is an NSG–6 category Indian railway station in Chennai railway division of Southern Railway zone. It is a railway station located in the suburb of Chennai. Its nearest town is Jolarpet.
