= Gummidipoondi =

- Suburb of Chennai
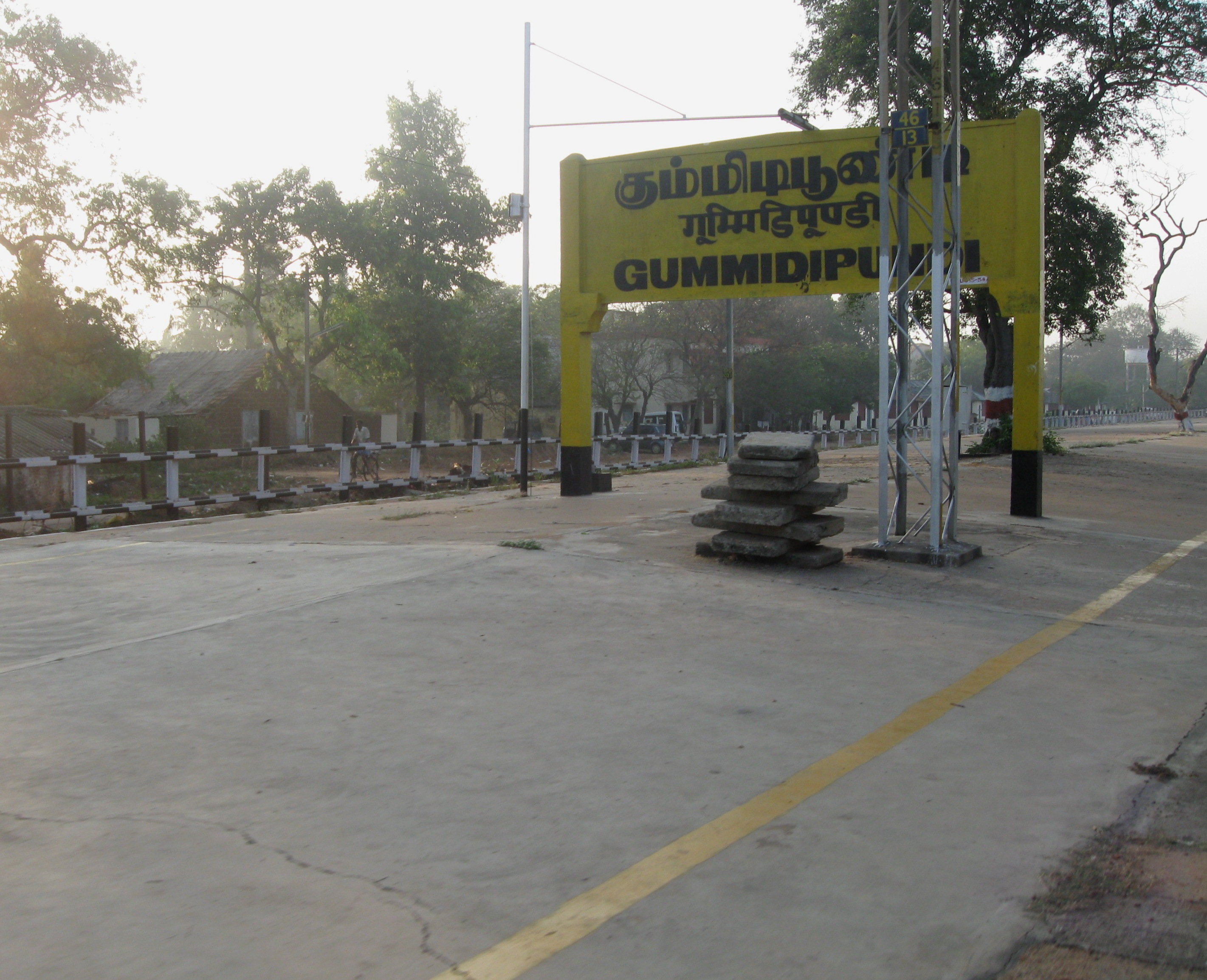
- Gummidipoondi Railway Station

- Gummidipoondi, Tamil Nadu
- Coordinates: 13.411000°N 80.117000°E
- Country: India
- State: Tamil Nadu
- District: Thiruvallur
- Metro: Chennai

Area
  - Total: 10 km^{2} (3.9 sq mi)
- Elevation: 43 m (141 ft)

Population (2011)
  - Total: 18,891
  - Density: 1,900/km^{2} (4,900/sq mi)

Languages
  - Official/Other: Tamil/Telugu
- Time zone: UTC+5:30 (IST)
- PIN: 601 201
- Vehicle registration: TN-18-AZ

Gummidipoondi is an industrial town in Chennai Metropolitan Region of Thiruvallur district in the Indian state of Tamil Nadu. Notably, it is the northernmost assembly constituency and settlement in the state of Tamil Nadu.

== Demographics ==
As of 2001 India census, Gummidipoondi had a population of 32,665. Males constitute 52% of the population and females 48%. Gummidipoondi has an average literacy rate of 86.5%, higher than the national average of 74.5%: male literacy is 89.7%, and female literacy is 83.4%. In Gummidipoondi, 12% of the population is under 6 years of age.

== Languages ==
Tamil is the official language for the people of Gummidipoondi town.Minority people also speak telugu and urdu in the town.

== Transport ==
Gummidipoondi lies on the National Highway 16 (India) from Chennai to Calcutta, which is a part of Golden Quadrilateral project. It is located at 24 km from Tada, Andhra Pradesh, 110 km from Nellore, 27 km from Satyavedu, 45 km from Chennai and 114 km from Tirupati. Gummidipoondi has a large bus stand near Gummidipoondi market. There are bus routes that connects to various rural areas and to Chennai. Various buses pass through GNT road from Tirupathi, Nellore, Sulurpet to Madhavaram inter city bus terminus. Gummidipoondi railway station has trains towards Chennai Central railway station.
