= Mandaveli railway station =

Railway station in Tamil Nadu, India

Mandaveli
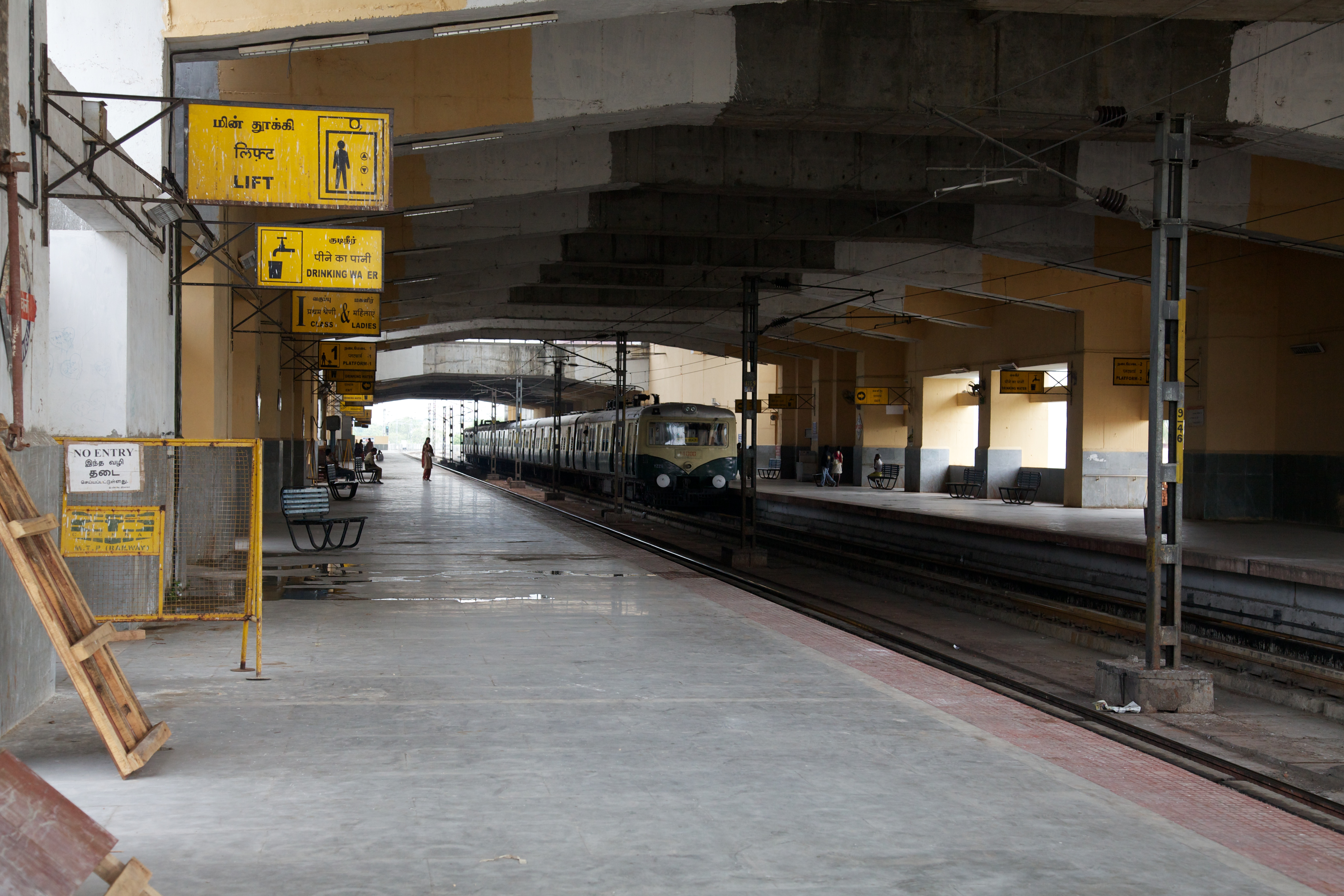
- Platform – Mandaveli commuter railway station – Chennai, India in 2011

General information
- Coordinates: 13°01′41″N 80°15′38″E
- System: Chennai MRTS
- Platforms: Side platform Platform-1 → St. Thomas Mount; Platform-2 → Chennai Beach
- Tracks: 2

Construction
- Structure type: Elevated

Other information
- Station code: MNDY

History
- Opened: 26 January 2004

Services
Preceding station	Chennai MRTS	Following station
Thirumayilai towards Chennai Beach	Line 1	Greenways Road towards St. Thomas Mount
Location

Mandaveli is a railway station on the Chennai MRTS. Located across the Venkatakrishna Road at Mandaveli, it exclusively serves the Chennai MRTS.

== History ==
Mandaveli station was opened on 26 January 2004, as part of the second phase of the Chennai MRTS network.

== Structure ==
The station is elevated and is built along the Buckingham Canal, covering both its banks. The station features two side platforms, and each are 280 metres long. The station building consists of 1,900 sq m of parking area in its basement.

=== Station layout ===
G	Street level	Exit/Entrance
L1	Mezzanine	Fare control, Station ticket counters and Automatic ticket vending machines
L2	Side platform | Doors will open on the left
L2	Platform 2 Northbound	Towards → Chennai Beach; Next Station: Thirumayilai
L2	Platform 1 Southbound	Towards ← St. Thomas Mount; Next Station: Greenways Road
L2	Side platform | Doors will open on the left
L2

== Service and connections ==
Mandaveli station is the ninth station on the MRTS line to St. Thomas Mount and twelfth station in the return direction from St. Thomas Mount.

== See also ==
- Chennai MRTS
- Chennai suburban railway
- Chennai Metro
- Transport in Chennai
