= Greenways Road railway station =

Railway station in Tamil Nadu, India

Greenways Road Pasumaivazhi Salai

General information
- Coordinates: 13°01′14″N 80°15′07″E
- System: Chennai MRTS
- Platforms: Side platform Platform-1 → St. Thomas Mount; Platform-2 → Chennai Beach
- Tracks: 2

Construction
- Structure type: Elevated

Other information
- Station code: GWYR

History
- Opened: 26 January 2004

Services
Preceding station	Chennai MRTS	Following station
Mandaveli towards Chennai Beach	Line 1	Kotturpuram towards St. Thomas Mount
Location

Greenways Road is a railway station on the Chennai MRTS. Located on Greenways Road, it exclusively serves the Chennai MRTS.

== History ==
Greenways Road station was opened on 26 January 2004, as part of the second phase of the Chennai MRTS network.

== Structure ==
The elevated station is built on the eastern bank of Buckingham Canal adjacent to the junction of the Buckingham Canal with Adyar River. Like most other stations along the Chennai MRTS route, Greenways Road features 2 side platforms, which the length of each platform being 280 metres. The station building consists of 3,300 sq m of parking area in its basement.

=== Station layout ===
G	Street level	Exit/Entrance
L1	Mezzanine	Fare control, Station ticket counters and Automatic ticket vending machines
L2	Side platform | Doors will open on the left
L2	Platform 2 Northbound	Towards → Chennai Beach; Next Station: Mandaveli
L2	Platform 1 Southbound	Towards ← St. Thomas Mount; Next Station: Kotturpuram
L2	Side platform | Doors will open on the left
L2

== Service and connections ==
Greenways Road is the tenth station on the MRTS line to St. Thomas Mount. In the return direction from St. Thomas Mount, it is currently the eleventh station towards Chennai Beach station.

== See also ==
- Chennai MRTS
- Chennai suburban railway
- Chennai Metro
- Transport in Chennai
