= Thiruvanmiyur railway station =

Railway station in Tamil Nadu, India

Thiruvanmiyur
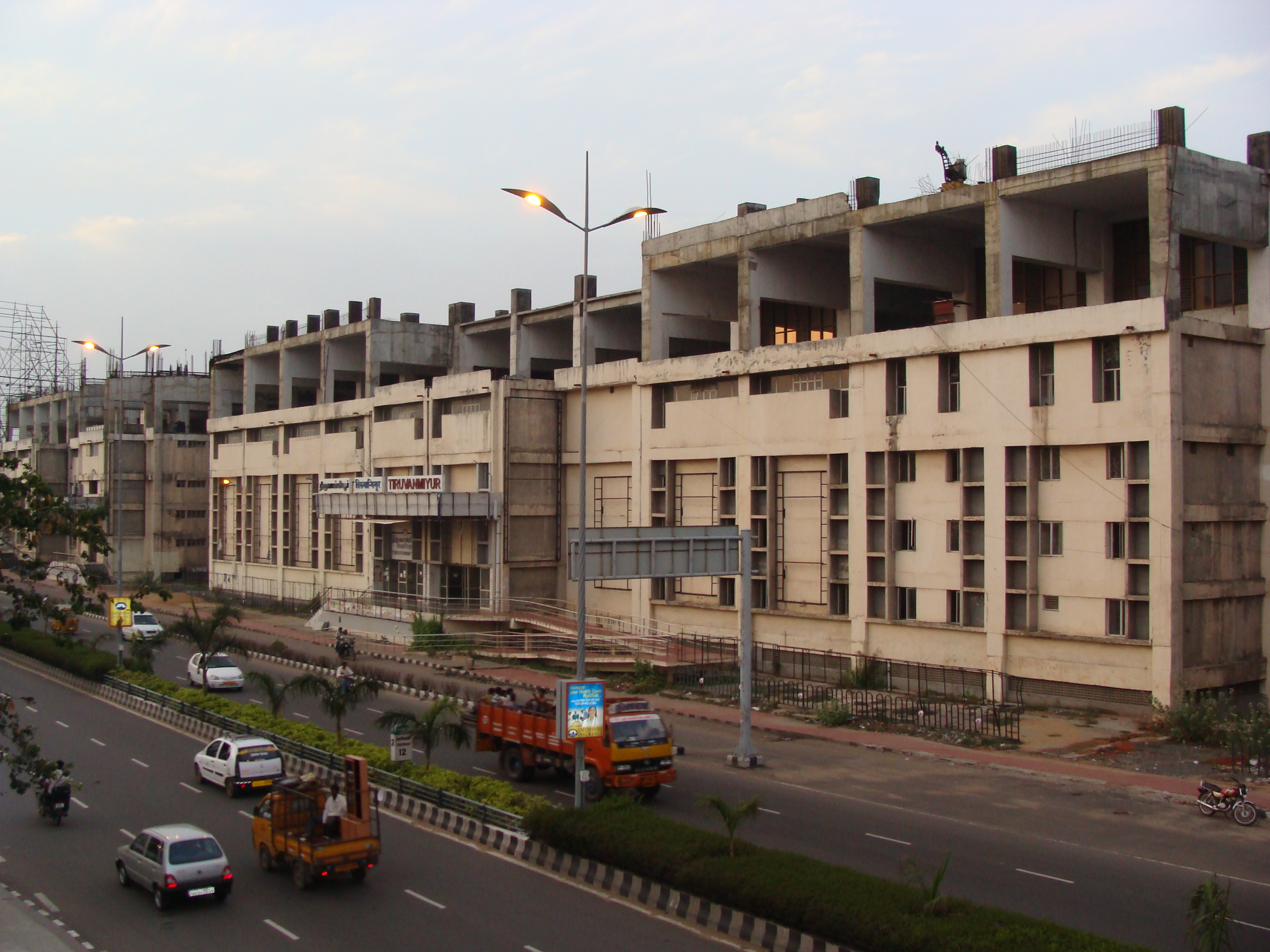
- Thiruvanmiyur MRTS station

General information
- Coordinates: 12°59′22″N 80°15′05″E
- System: Chennai MRTS
- Platforms: Side platform Platform-1 → St. Thomas Mount; Platform-2 → Chennai Beach
- Tracks: 2
- Connections: Purple Line Thiruvanmiyur metro station

Construction
- Structure type: Elevated

Other information
- Station code: TYMR

History
- Opened: 26 January 2004

Services
Preceding station	Chennai MRTS	Following station
Indira Nagar towards Chennai Beach	Line 1	Taramani towards St. Thomas Mount
Location

Thiruvanmiyur is a station on the Chennai MRTS in India. Located opposite the Tidel Park on Rajiv Gandhi Salai at Taramani, it exclusively serves the Chennai MRTS.

== History ==
Thiruvanmiyur station was opened on 26 January 2004, as part of the second phase of the Chennai MRTS network. Since it was the terminal station at the time of its opening, a crossover was initially planned at the station to divert the trains between up and down directions. However, this was never realised as the project administration failed to include this requirement in the revised proposal for ballastless track. The up and down lines between Tirumailai and Tiruvanmiyur (a station before Velacheri) were completed during 2003. Execution of the balance portion of work beyond Tiruvanmiyur had been delayed due to the sinkage of earth. Owing to this, trains moving in the 'up' direction from Thirumailai to Thiruvanmiyur were required to be moved to the 'down' line for the return trip. In addition, safety was also in question with the operation of trains in both lines without the crossover. This led to operating trains only in the 'up' line for a long time until the construction of stations till Velachery. The 'down' line created at a cost of ₹ 1,850 million had been idling for several months.

== Structure ==
The elevated station is on the western banks of the Buckingham Canal. The platform length is 280 metres (920 ft). The station building consists of 1,392 square metres (14,980 ft^{2}) of parking area in its basement.

=== Station layout ===
G	Street level	Exit/Entrance
L1	Mezzanine	Fare control, Station ticket counters and Automatic ticket vending machines
L2	Side platform | Doors will open on the left
L2	Platform 2 Northbound	Towards → Chennai Beach; Next Station: Indira Nagar
L2	Platform 1 Southbound	Towards ← St. Thomas Mount; Next Station: Taramani
L2	Side platform | Doors will open on the left
L2

== Service and connections ==
Thiruvanmiyur station is the fourteenth station on the MRTS line to St. Thomas Mount. In the return direction from St. Thomas Mount, it is currently the seventh station towards Chennai Beach station.

== Developments ==
In September 2013, the Indian Railway Catering and Tourism Corporation (IRCTC) invited tenders for setting up a food plaza in the station, along with two other stations, namely, Thirumayilai and Velachery.

== See also ==
- Chennai MRTS
- Chennai suburban railway
- Chennai Metro
- Transport in Chennai
