= Kasturba Nagar, Chennai =

Region

Kasturba Nagar, or Kasturibai Nagar, is a neighborhood in Adyar, in the southern part of the Indian city of Chennai. It is bordered by Gandhi Nagar, Indira Nagar, Buckingham Canal and Tharamani.

== History ==
Kasturba Nagar was established in 1949 by Daniel Thomas, Local Administration Minister in the Omandur Ramaswamy Reddiar cabinet. Thomas' original plan was to construct a large middle-class housing colony in the city. His efforts led to the establishment of Gandhi Nagar which had 332 housing plots. However, the demand for housing in the neighborhood was so high that Thomas decided to acquire another 130 acres towards the south to establish Kasturba Nagar.

== Present Day ==
Kasturba Nagar today is a thriving neighborhood that serves as a gateway to the 45 kilometer long IT corridor along Rajiv Gandhi Salai. The Chennai branch of UNICEF is located in Kasturba Nagar along with several commercial establishments, hospitals and banks. The Kasturba Nagar railway station was opened in 2004 and serves the Chennai MRTS network.
