= Mundagakanniamman Koil railway station =

Railway station in India

Coordinates: 13.0407°N 80.2698°E

Mundakakanniamman Koil Mundakakanniamman Temple

General information
- System: Chennai MRTS
- Platforms: Side platform Platform-1 → St. Thomas Mount; Platform-2 → Chennai Beach
- Tracks: 2

Construction
- Structure type: Elevated

History
- Opened: 2014; 12 years ago

Services
Preceding station	Chennai MRTS	Following station
Light House towards Chennai Beach	Line 1	Thirumayilai towards St. Thomas Mount
Location

Mundagakanniamman Koil is a railway station on the Chennai MRTS, located near Brindavan Street and Mundakakanni Amman Koil Street in Mylapore, along the Buckingham Canal. The station exclusively serves the Chennai MRTS, and serves the neighbourhood of northern Mylapore, Santhome and Royapettah.

== History ==
Mundakakanniamman Koil station is the 18th MRTS station to be operational. Work on the station began in 2002, at an initial estimated cost of ₹ 85.5 million. The station has been built as an additional one in the first phase of the Chennai MRTS network completed much earlier. Initially slated to be completed in April 2009 at a cost of ₹ 350 million, the construction was delayed due to land-acquisition issues. The next deadline was set as 2012 and again it was delayed due to getting approval for the name. The cost of construction was ₹ 100 million. The station was opened to public on 14 May 2014.

=== Unnecessary Controversy in station's name ===
The station name had been courting unnecessary controversy ever since it was slated to be completed. The construction cost had run to ₹ 100 million.

The station's name ran into unnecessary controversy in June 2013 when over 80 per cent work was over, since some local non Hindu residents and organisations opposed the naming of the station after the Hindu goddess Mundakakanniamman though there are stations in India like Masjid in Mumbai suburban railway and St.Thomas Mount in Chennai suburban railway. A temple of Goddess Mundakakanniamman is almost in the vicinity of the station, which covers Ganeshapuram and Slatterpuram that have a good number of Christian and Muslim population. The station's name boards were whitewashed by some miscreants, and the inauguration of the station, which was earlier scheduled for 15 May 2013, was deferred by a year. Later the Tamil Nadu government decided to retain the name since the station is located on the very street where the temple is situated, and the station was named " Mundakakanniamman Koil."

== Structure ==
The station is an elevated one built on the banks of the Buckingham Canal like most other MRTS stations. The station building consists of 2,400 sq m of parking area in its basement. The design of the station is similar to that of the Thirumailai station. The station has only one entrance as the Buckingham Canal runs alongside.

=== Station layout ===
G	Street level	Exit/Entrance
L1	Mezzanine	Fare control, Station ticket counters and Automatic ticket vending machines
L2	Side platform | Doors will open on the left
L2	Platform 2 Northbound	Towards → Chennai Beach; Next Station: Light House
L2	Platform 1 Southbound	Towards ← St. Thomas Mount; Next Station: Thirumayilai
L2	Side platform | Doors will open on the left
L2

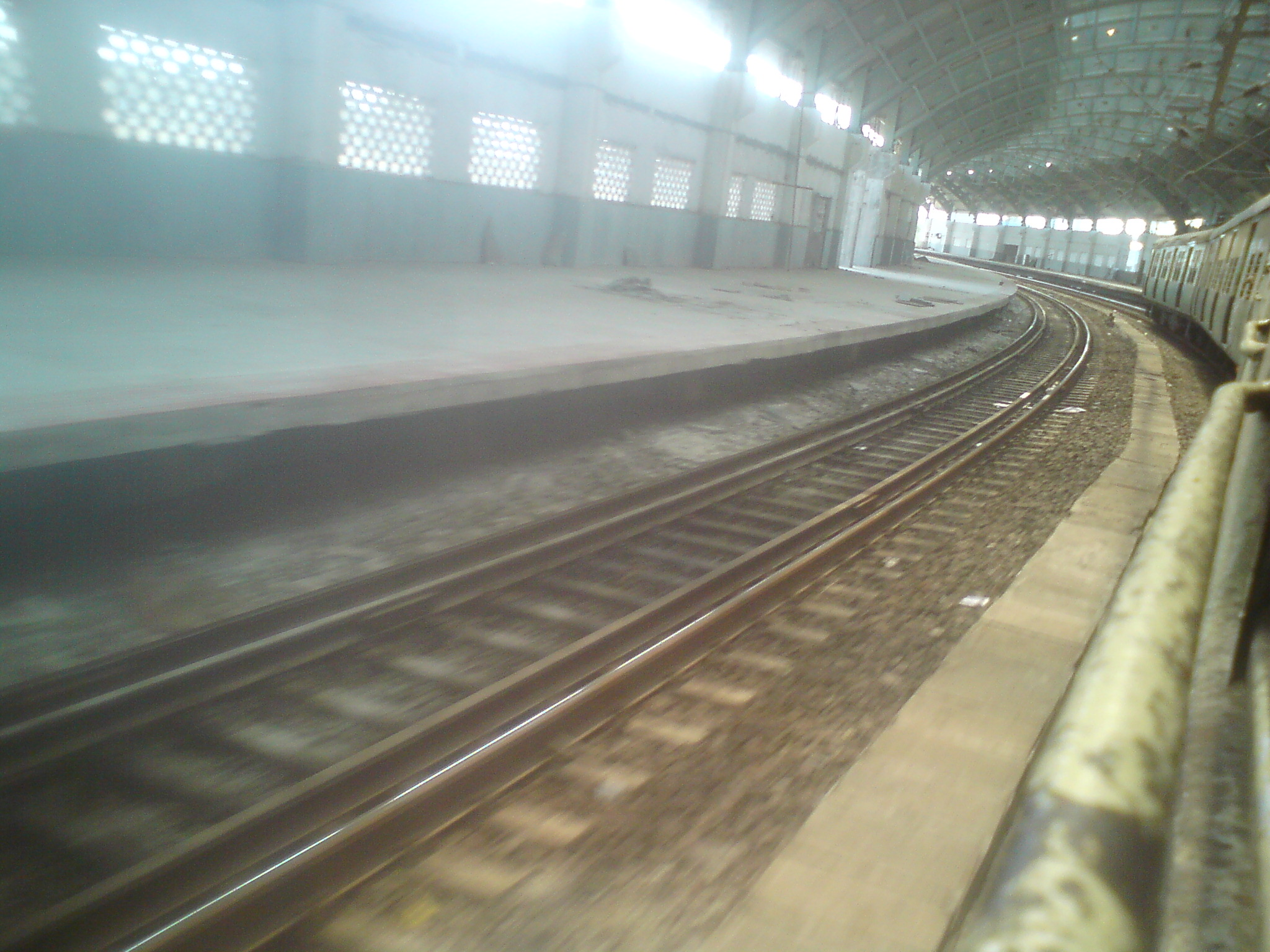
Mundakakanniamman Koil MRTS station under construction as seen from an MRTS train in November 2012.

== See also ==
- Chennai MRTS
- Chennai suburban railway
- Chennai Metro
- Transport in Chennai
