= Thirumayilai railway station =

Railway station in Tamil Nadu, India

Thirumayilai Mylapore
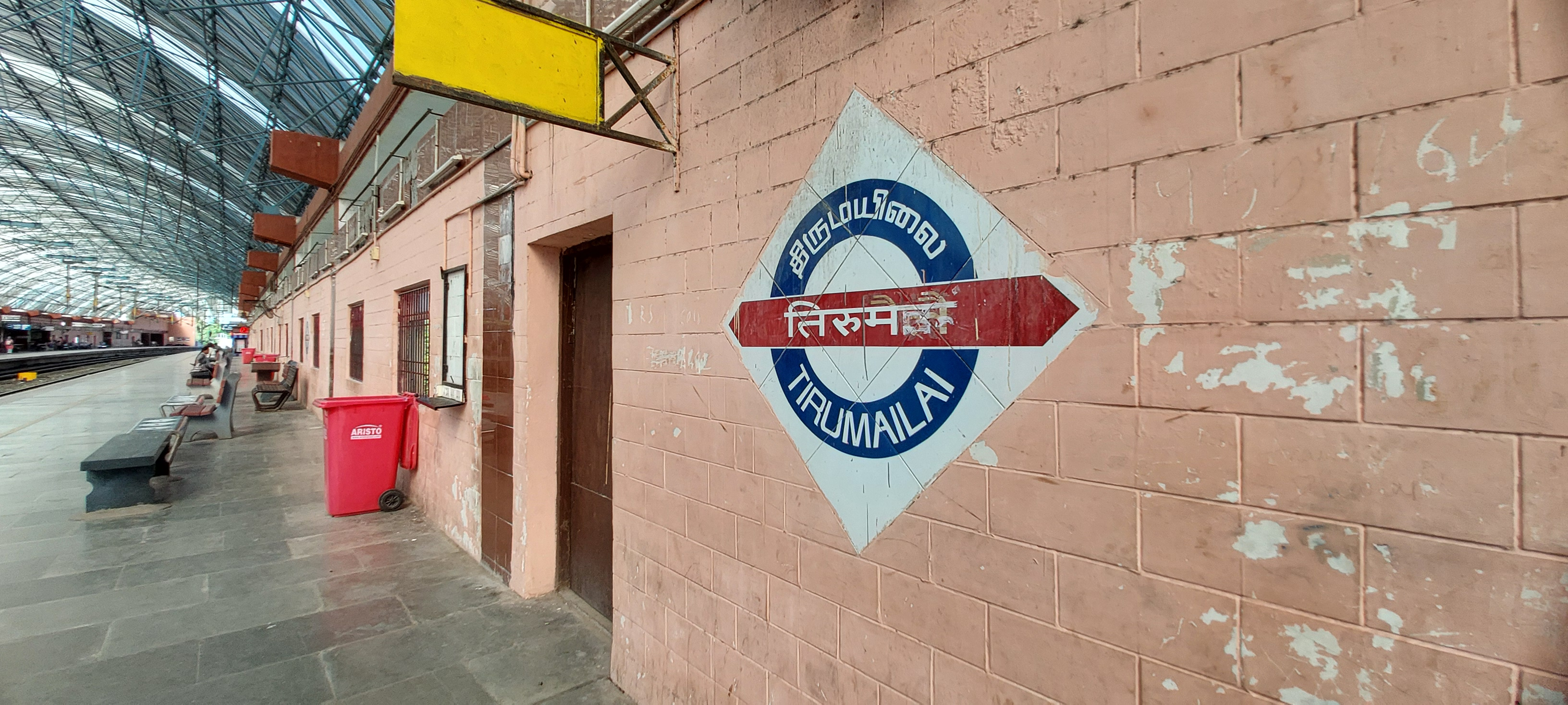
- Thirumayilai MRTS station

General information
- Coordinates: 13°02′06″N 80°16′02″E
- System: Chennai MRTS
- Platforms: Side platform Platform-1 → St. Thomas Mount; Platform-2 → Chennai Beach
- Tracks: 2
- Connections: Yellow LinePurple Line Thirumayilai

Construction
- Structure type: Elevated

Other information
- Station code: MTMY

History
- Opened: 19 October 1997

Passengers
- 2009–10: 3,235 per day (average)

Services
Preceding station	Chennai MRTS	Following station
Mundagakanniamman Koil towards Chennai Beach	Line 1	Mandaveli towards St. Thomas Mount
Location

Thirumayilai MRTS station, or simply Mylapore railway station, is a railway station on the Chennai MRTS line. It was started in 1997 which marked the completion of Phase I of the Chennai MRTS project. The station is located on the bank of Buckingham Canal, accessible from Ramakrishna Mutt road near Luz Corner. The Station building also comprises the Rail Vikas Nigam Limited (RVNL) office and Southern Railway's Computerized Ticket Reservation Centre. The Station building consists of 1050 sq.m of parking area in its basement.

The station is about 13.540 metres from mean sea level.

== Station layout ==
G	Street level	Exit/Entrance
L1	Mezzanine	Fare control, Station ticket counters and Automatic ticket vending machines
L2	Side platform | Doors will open on the left
L2	Platform 2 Northbound	Towards → Chennai Beach; Next Station: Mundagakanniamman Koil
L2	Platform 1 Southbound	Towards ← St. Thomas Mount; Next Station: Mandaveli
L2	Side platform | Doors will open on the left
L2

== Developments ==
In September 2013, the Indian Railway Catering and Tourism Corporation (IRCTC) invited tenders for setting up a food plaza in the station, along with two other stations, namely, Thiruvanmiyur and Velachery.

== See also ==
- Chennai MRTS
- Chennai suburban railway
- Chennai Metro
- Transport in Chennai
