= Chepauk railway station =

Urban train station in Chennai, India

Chepauk Chepakkam
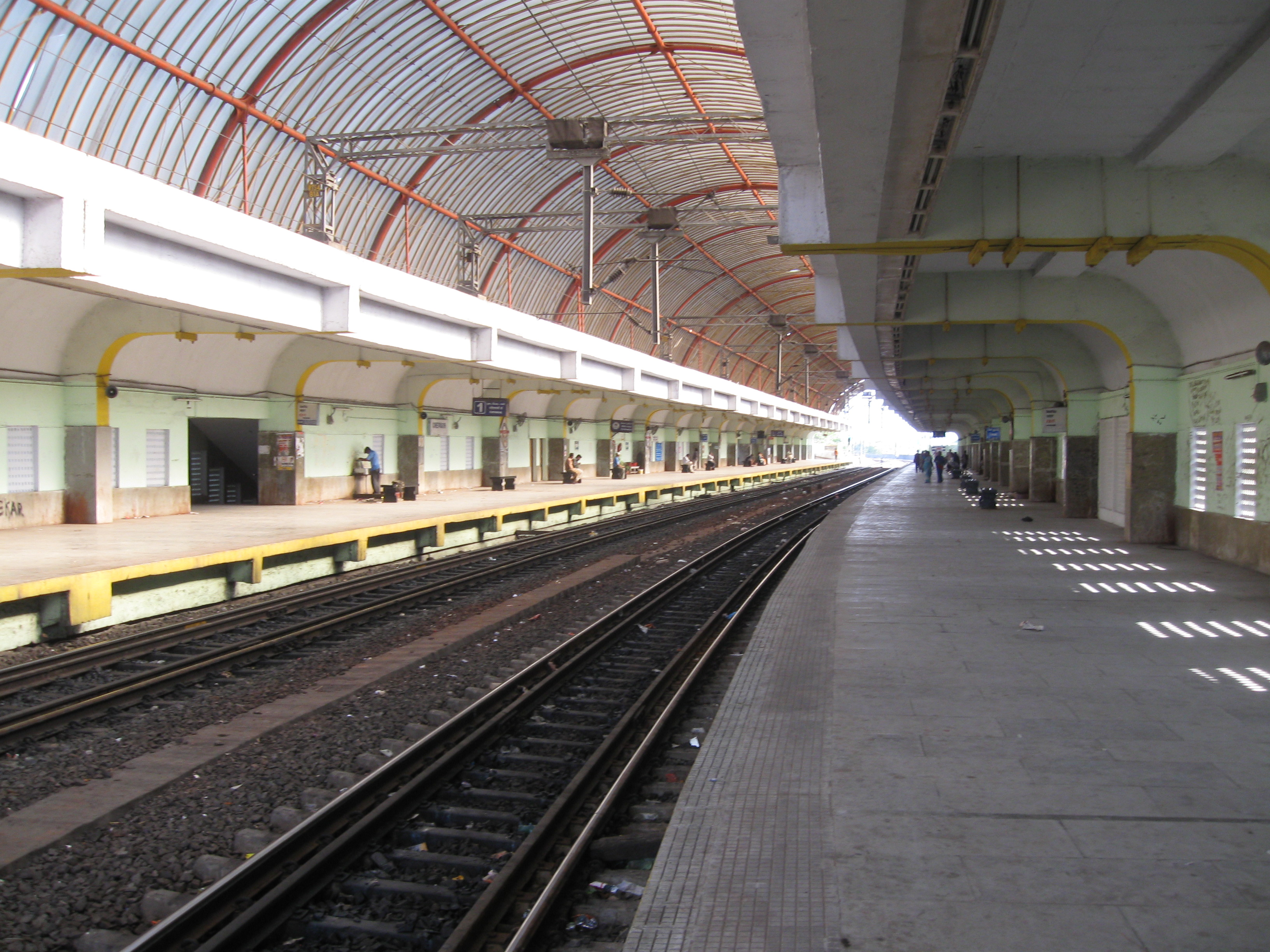
- Chepauk MRTS station

General information
- Coordinates: 13°03′44″N 80°16′50″E
- System: Chennai MRTS
- Platforms: Side platform Platform-1 → St. Thomas Mount; Platform-2 → Chennai Beach
- Tracks: 2

Construction
- Structure type: Elevated

History
- Opened: 1 November 1995

Services
Preceding station	Chennai MRTS	Following station
Chintadripet towards Chennai Beach	Line 1	Thiruvallikeni towards St. Thomas Mount
Location

Chepauk is a station on the Chennai MRTS railway line. It is located in the eastern Chennai neighbourhood of Chepauk near the M. A. Chidambaram Stadium. The station is built on the bank of Buckingham Canal. The station was opened in November 1995 as a part of the first phase, when services were operated from Chennai Beach station to Chepauk. As it is adjacent to the government offices in the area, such as Kuralagam and Doordarshan, the station sees many commuters who work in these offices.

== Station layout ==
G	Street level	Exit/Entrance
L1	Mezzanine	Fare control, Station ticket counters and Automatic ticket vending machines
L2	Side platform | Doors will open on the left
L2	Platform 2 Northbound	Towards → Chennai Beach; Next Station: Chintadripet
L2	Platform 1 Southbound	Towards ← St. Thomas Mount; Next Station: Thiruvallikeni
L2	Side platform | Doors will open on the left
L2

== Services and connections ==
It is currently the fifth station from Chennai Beach station heading towards St. Thomas Mount railway station, and is the sixteenth station from St. Thomas Mount towards Chennai Beach station. The station building contains a 1500 square meter car park in its lower level.

== Nearby landmarks ==
M. A. Chidambaram Cricket Stadium is located adjacent to the station. The station thus offers a "vantage view" of the matches played in the stadium. The University of Madras, Chepauk campus and the Tamil Nadu Public Works Department main building are also located near the station; the station itself serves as a commute to a large number of students, professors and government officials working in these premises.

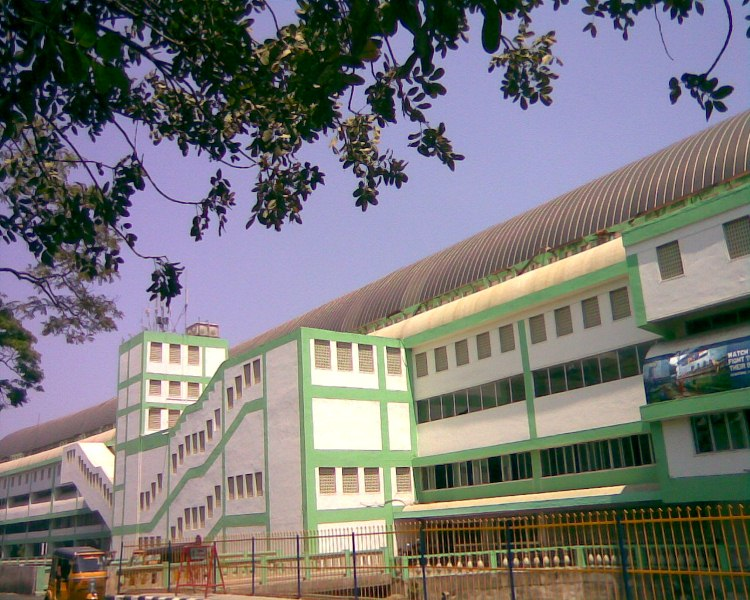
Facade of the station

== See also ==
- Chennai MRTS
- Chennai suburban railway
- Chennai Metro
- Transport in Chennai
