= Thiruvallikeni railway station =

Railway station in Tamil Nadu, India

Tiruvallikeni Triplicane

General information
- Coordinates: 13°03′19″N 80°16′50″E
- System: Chennai MRTS
- Platforms: Side platform Platform-1 → St. Thomas Mount; Platform-2 → Chennai Beach
- Tracks: 2

Construction
- Structure type: Elevated
- Parking: Yes

History
- Opened: 19 October 1997

Services
Preceding station	Chennai MRTS	Following station
Chepauk towards Chennai Beach	Line 1	Light House towards St. Thomas Mount
Location

Thiruvallikeni is a station on the Chennai MRTS. Located just behind the Marina Campus of the University of Madras along the Marina Beach, it exclusively serves the Chennai MRTS. The station serves the neighbourhood of Triplicane.

== History ==
Thiruvallikeni station was opened on 19 October 1997, as part of the first phase of the Chennai MRTS network.

== Structure ==
The station is an elevated one built on the banks of the Buckingham Canal like most other MRTS stations. The station building consists of 940 sq m of parking area in its basement.

=== Station layout ===
G	Street level	Exit/Entrance
L1	Mezzanine	Fare control, Station ticket counters and Automatic ticket vending machines
L2	Side platform | Doors will open on the left
L2	Platform 2 Northbound	Towards → Chennai Beach; Next Station: Chepauk
L2	Platform 1 Southbound	Towards ← St. Thomas Mount; Next Station: Light House
L2	Side platform | Doors will open on the left
L2

== Service and connections ==
Thiruvallikeni station is the sixth station on the MRTS line to St. Thomas Mount. In the return direction from St. Thomas Mount, it is the fifteenth station towards Chennai Beach station.

== See also ==
- Chennai MRTS
- Chennai suburban railway
- Chennai Metro
- Transport in Chennai
