= Light House railway station =

Railway station in Chennai, India

Light House Kalankarai Vilakkam
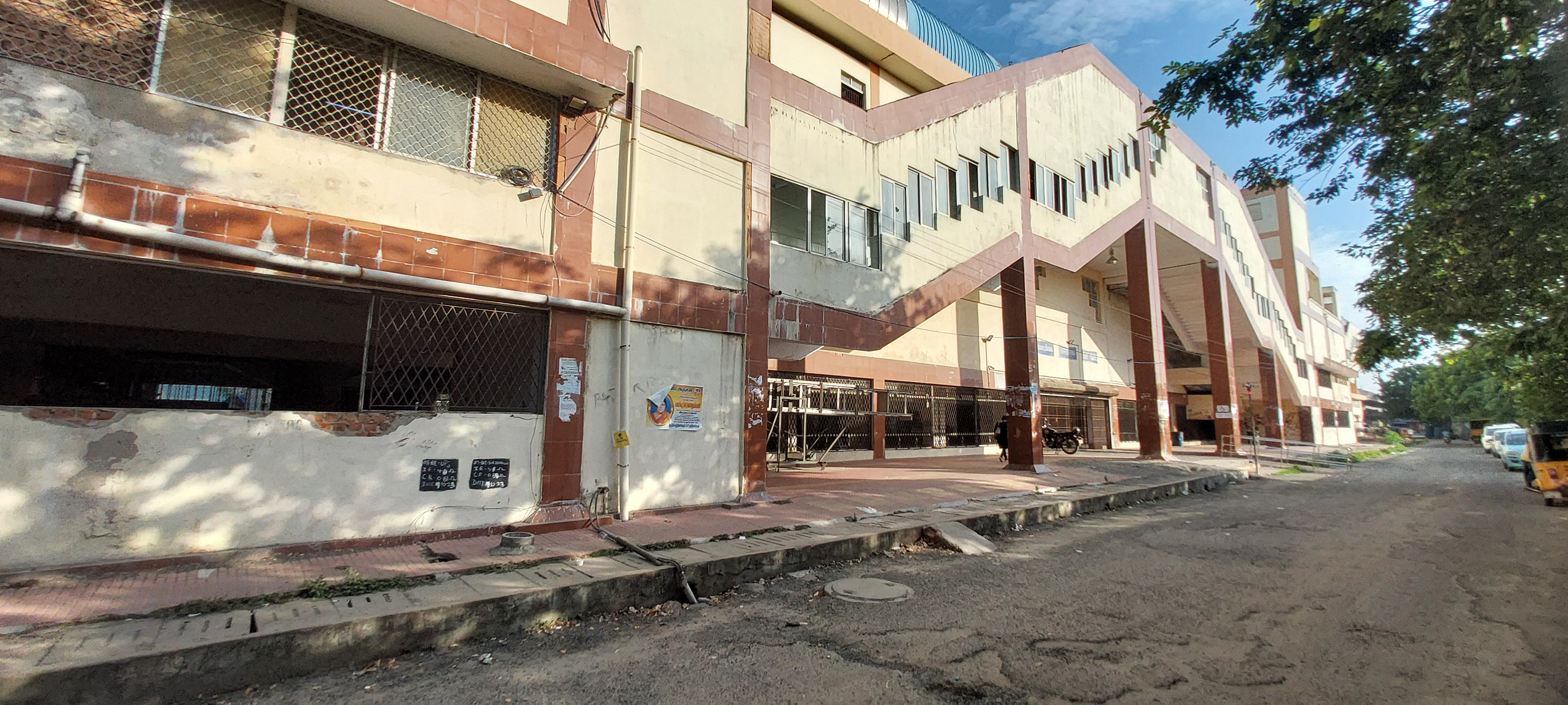
- Light House railway station building

General information
- Coordinates: 13°02′43″N 80°16′37″E
- System: Chennai MRTS
- Owner: Indian Railways
- Platforms: Side platform Platform-1 → St. Thomas Mount; Platform-2 → Chennai Beach
- Tracks: 2

Construction
- Structure type: Elevated
- Parking: Yes

Other information
- Station code: MLHS
- Fare zone: Chennai

History
- Opened: 19 October 1997; 29 years ago

Services
Preceding station	Chennai MRTS	Following station
Thiruvallikeni towards Chennai Beach	Line 1	Mundagakanniamman Koil towards St. Thomas Mount
Location

Light House is a railway station on the Chennai MRTS. It is located behind the Queen Mary's college, between Avvai Shanmugam Salai in Triplicane and Radha Krishnan Salai at Mylapore. It is the MRTS station for the Chennai Lighthouse.

== History ==
Light House station was opened on 19 October 1997, as part of the first phase of the Chennai MRTS network.

== Structure ==
The station is elevated and built on the eastern banks of the Buckingham Canal. The Station building consists of 1010 sq.m of parking area in its basement, which is largely unused.

=== Station layout ===
G	Street level	Exit/Entrance
L1	Mezzanine	Fare control, Station ticket counters and Automatic ticket vending machines
L2	Side platform | Doors will open on the left
L2	Platform 2 Northbound	Towards → Chennai Beach; Next Station: Thiruvallikeni
L2	Platform 1 Southbound	Towards ← St. Thomas Mount; Next Station: Mundagakanniamman Koil
L2	Side platform | Doors will open on the left
L2

== Service and connections ==
Light House station is the seventh station on the MRTS line to St. Thomas Mount. In the return direction from St. Thomas Mount, it is currently the fourteenth station towards Chennai Beach station.

== See also ==
- Chennai MRTS
- Chennai suburban railway
- Chennai Metro
- Transport in Chennai
