= Indira Nagar railway station =

Railway station in Tamil Nadu, India

Indira Nagar

General information
- Coordinates: 12°59′47″N 80°14′59″E
- System: Chennai MRTS
- Platforms: Side platform Platform-1 → St. Thomas Mount; Platform-2 → Chennai Beach
- Tracks: 2

Construction
- Structure type: Elevated

Other information
- Station code: INDR

History
- Opened: 26 January 2004; 22 years ago

Services
Preceding station	Chennai MRTS	Following station
Kasturba Nagar towards Chennai Beach	Line 1	Thiruvanmiyur towards St. Thomas Mount
Location

Indira Nagar is a railway station on the Chennai MRTS. Located opposite the Institute of Chemical Technology on Rajiv Gandhi Salai (OMR), it exclusively serves the Chennai MRTS. The station can also be accessed through canal bank road, Indira Nagar.

== History ==
Indira Nagar station was opened on 26 January 2004, as part of the second phase of the Chennai MRTS network.

== Structure ==
The elevated station is built on the western banks of Buckingham Canal. The length of the platform is 280 m. The station building consists of 1,350 sq m of parking area in its basement.

=== Station layout ===
G	Street level	Exit/Entrance
L1	Mezzanine	Fare control, Station ticket counters and Automatic ticket vending machines
L2	Side platform | Doors will open on the left
L2	Platform 2 Northbound	Towards → Chennai Beach; Next Station: Kasturba Nagar
L2	Platform 1 Southbound	Towards ← St. Thomas Mount; Next Station: Thiruvanmiyur
L2	Side platform | Doors will open on the left
L2

== Service and connections ==
Indira Nagar station is the thirteenth station on the MRTS line to St. Thomas Mount. In the return direction from St. Thomas Mount, it is currently the eighth station towards Chennai Beach station

== See also ==
- Chennai MRTS
- Chennai suburban railway
- Chennai Metro
- Transport in Chennai
