= Kotturpuram railway station =

Railway station in Tamil Nadu, India

Kotturpuram
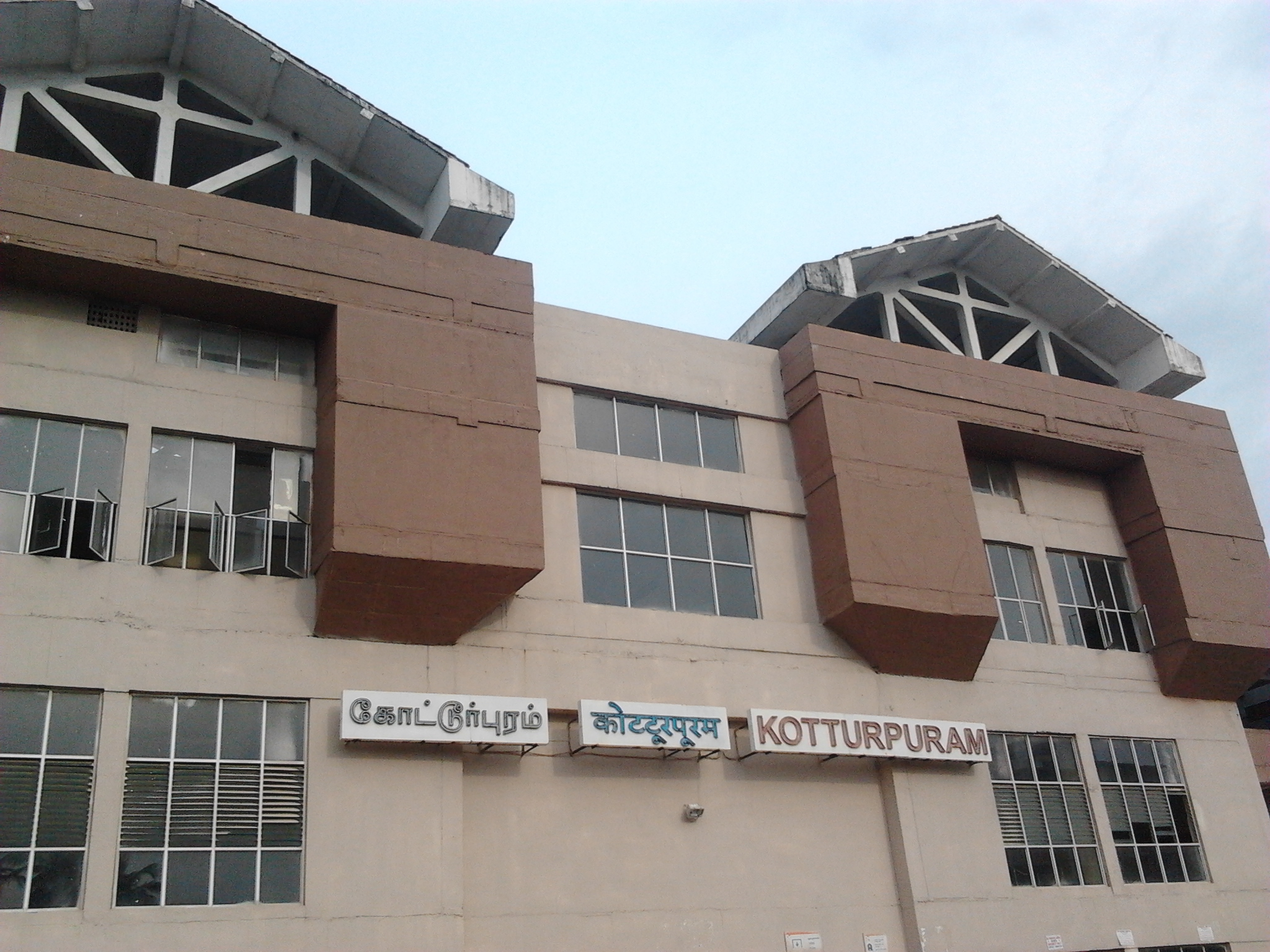
- Kotturpuram railway station

General information
- Coordinates: 13°00′50″N 80°14′54″E
- System: Chennai MRTS
- Platforms: Side platform Platform-1 → St. Thomas Mount; Platform-2 → Chennai Beach
- Tracks: 2

Construction
- Structure type: Elevated

Other information
- Station code: KTPM

History
- Opened: 26 January 2004

Services
Preceding station	Chennai MRTS	Following station
Greenways Road towards Chennai Beach	Line 1	Kasturba Nagar towards St. Thomas Mount
Location

Kotturpuram is a railway station on the Chennai MRTS. Situated on the banks of the Buckingham canal, the station is accessible through Ponniamman Koil Road in Kotturpuram.

== History ==
Kotturpuram station was opened on 26 January 2004, as part of the second phase of the Chennai MRTS network.

== Structure ==
The elevated station is built on the eastern banks of Buckingham Canal south of Adyar river. The length of the platform is 280 m. The station building consists of 4,312 sq m of parking area in its basement.

=== Station layout ===
G	Street level	Exit/Entrance
L1	Mezzanine	Fare control, Station ticket counters and Automatic ticket vending machines
L2	Side platform | Doors will open on the left
L2	Platform 2 Northbound	Towards → Chennai Beach; Next Station: Greenways Road
L2	Platform 1 Southbound	Towards ← St. Thomas Mount; Next Station: Kasturba Nagar
L2	Side platform | Doors will open on the left
L2

== Service and connections ==
Kotturpuram station is the eleventh station on the MRTS line to St. Thomas Mount. In the return direction from St. Thomas Mount, it is currently the tenth station towards Chennai Beach station

== See also ==
- Chennai MRTS
- Chennai suburban railway
- Chennai Metro
- Transport in Chennai
