= Taramani railway station =

Railway station in Chennai, India

Taramani
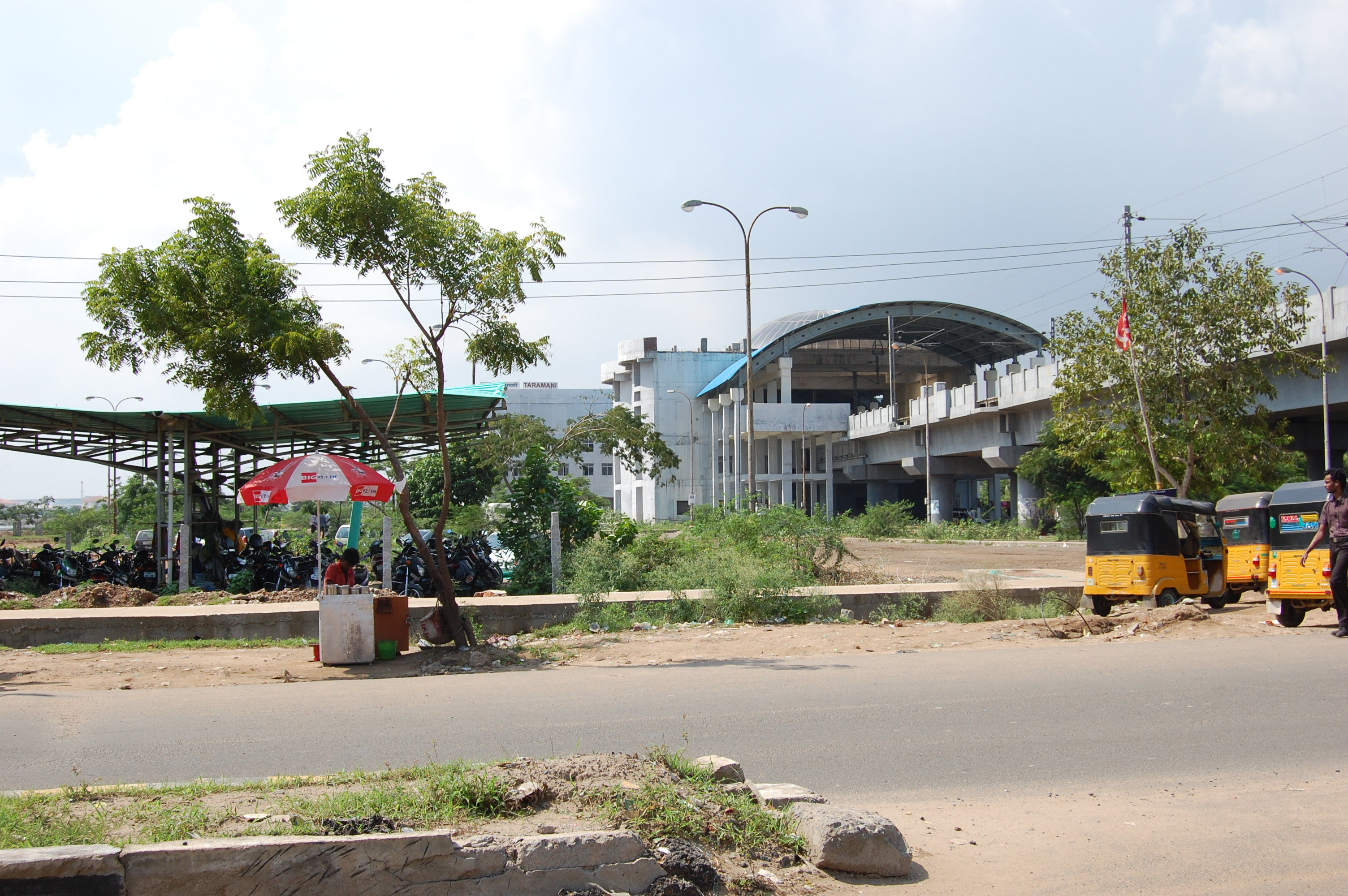
- MRTS station at Tharamani

General information
- Coordinates: 12°58′43″N 80°14′27″E
- System: Chennai MRTS
- Platforms: Side platform Platform-1 → St. Thomas Mount; Platform-2 → Chennai Beach
- Tracks: 2

Construction
- Structure type: Elevated

Other information
- Station code: TRMN

History
- Opened: 19 November 2007; 18 years ago

Services
Preceding station	Chennai MRTS	Following station
Thiruvanmiyur towards Chennai Beach	Line 1	Perungudi towards St. Thomas Mount
Location

Taramani is a railway station on the Chennai MRTS in Chennai, India. Located off MGR Main Road in Taramani, it exclusively serves the Chennai MRTS.

== History ==
Taramani station was opened on 19 November 2007, as part of the second phase of the Chennai MRTS network.

== Structure ==
The length of the platform is 280 m. The station premises includes 9,080 sq m of open parking area.

=== Station layout ===
G	Street level	Exit/Entrance
L1	Mezzanine	Fare control, Station ticket counters and Automatic ticket vending machines
L2	Side platform | Doors will open on the left
L2	Platform 2 Northbound	Towards → Chennai Beach; Next Station: Thiruvanmiyur
L2	Platform 1 Southbound	Towards ← St. Thomas Mount; Next Station: Perungudi
L2	Side platform | Doors will open on the left
L2

== Service and connections ==
Taramani station is the fifteenth station on the MRTS line to St. Thomas Mount. In the return direction from St. Thomas Mount, it is currently the sixth station towards Chennai Beach station A 3.4 km-long, 18 m-wide access road to Perungudi station and Taramani station is being constructed along the MRTS line from Velachery to Taramani.

== See also ==
- Chennai MRTS
- Chennai suburban railway
- Chennai Metro
- Transport in Chennai
