= Chennai Mass Rapid Transit System =

Metropolitan elevated railway line in Chennai, India

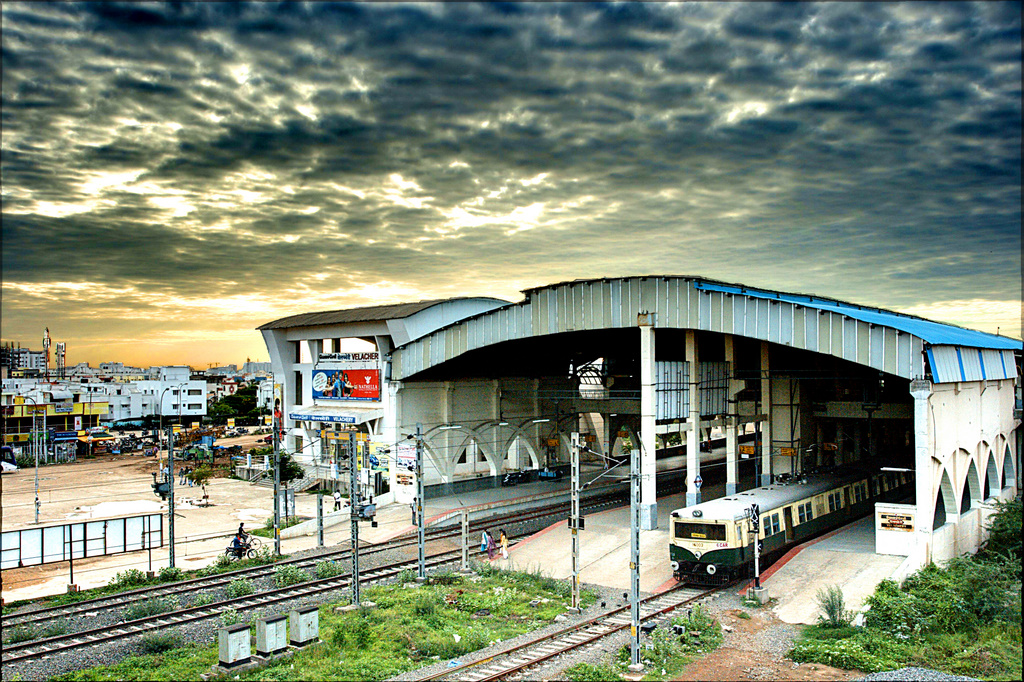
- Velachery MRTS station

Overview
- Owner: Southern Railway
- Locale: Chennai, Tamil Nadu, India
- Transit type: Rapid Transit
- Number of lines: 1
- Number of stations: 21
- Daily ridership: 200,000 (2023)
- Headquarters: Chennai
- Website: www.sr.indianrailways.gov.in

Operation
- Began operation: 16 November 1995; 31 years ago
- Operator: Southern Railway
- Train length: 9 coaches

Technical
- System length: 24.245 km (15.065 mi)
- No. of tracks: 2
- Track gauge: 5 ft 6 in (1,676 mm)
- Electrification: 25 kV 50 Hz AC overhead catenary

The Chennai Mass Rapid Transit System, commonly referred to as Chennai MRTS, is a metropolitan rail transit system in Chennai, India. It is operated by Southern Railway of the state-owned Indian Railways. Opened in 1995, it was the first elevated railway line in India. The railway line runs from Chennai Beach to St. Thomas Mount, covering a distance of 23.98 km (14.90 mi) with 21 stations and is integrated with the wider Chennai suburban railway network.

While the suburban railway has been operational in Madras since 1931, the Planning Commission of Government of India formed a research group to recommend development of transportation in major cities including Madras in 1965. The Madras Area Transportation Study Unit identified eight transport corridors including the 39 km (24 mi) north–southeastern rail corridor along the Buckingham Canal. The Government of India approved a Mass Rapid Transit System for the southern section in 1983–84 with the project to be implemented in four phases. The project was implemented by the Ministry of Railways and construction began in 1991. The first phase from Madras Beach to Chepauk was completed in 1995 with further extension to Thirumayilai in 1997. Part of second phase from Thirumayilai to Thiruvanmiyur was completed in 2004 with further extension to Velachery in 2007. The planned extension from Velachery to St. Thomas Mount was completed in March 2026, after repeated delays.

The Chennai MRTS line is largely elevated with at-grade sections at its terminals. The line runs at-grade initially till Park Town, parallel to the suburban railway network. It becomes elevated thereon, roughly following the course of the Buckingham Canal and running parallel to the Coromandel Coast till Thiruvanmiyur before deviating west towards Velachery. It uses the same broad gauge (5 ft 6in) as the suburban system, thus allowing the movements of trains between the existing suburban lines and the MRTS. The Chennai MRTS uses 9-car electrical multiple unit (EMU) train sets. The trains use 25 kV overhead catenary for traction. The coaches are manufactured by the Integral Coach Factory, Chennai. The coaches are not air-conditioned and are equipped with first-class and second-class passenger seating.

As of 2023, the system has a daily ridership of 100,000. With the implementation of the Chennai Metro Rail starting in 2015 and planned expansion of the same, further expansion of the MRTS system was put on hold in 2017, with the plans for the MRTS system to be taken over by Chennai Metro Rail Limited. In 2022, the Southern Railway of Indian Railways gave an in-principle approval for the take-over under which the coaches, stations and other infrastructure will be upgraded on par with the Chennai Metro.

== Background ==
The Chennai Suburban Railway started operations in 1931 on a single electrified line from Chennai Beach to Tambaram. Suburban services commenced on the second line between Chennai Central and Gummidipoondi in 1985 the third line from Central towards Arakkonam was added later. In 1965, the Planning Commission formed a group to study the suitability of the existing transportation network, to ascertain the viability of various ways of transportation and advocate plans for the expansion of transportation in metropolitan cities including Madras.

=== Planning ===
Surveys were conducted to supplement the existing transport infrastructure in Madras, such as the Madras Area Transportation Study (1968), Integrated Transport Plan (1977) and Madras Route Rationalisation Study (1986). The Madras Area Transportation Study Unit (MATSU) identified eight important transport corridors including the north–southeastern rail corridor connecting Kasturba Nagar and Manali Road. The study suggested the implementation of a rail-based Mass Rapid Transit System (MRTS) on the southern section of the line along the Buckingham Canal, connecting to the existent suburban system. The system was envisaged as a 59.38 km (36.90 mi) loop line connecting Chennai Beach and Tiruvottiyur.

Since the planned railway line would pass through congested parts of the city, an elevated rail system was selected, to avoid land acquisition problems. The project was intended to be implemented in four phases: Chennai Beach to Thirumayilai, Tirumayilai to St. Thomas Mount, St. Thomas Mount to Villivakkam and Villivakkam to Ennore.

== Construction and opening ==
Railway map of the Chennai showing the MRTS line in olive green

=== Phase I ===
The project was sanctioned for implementation by the Ministry of Railways, Government of India in 1983-84. After multiple delays, construction began in 1991 and part of the first phase from Chennai Beach to Chepauk was completed in 1995. It became operational on 16 November 1995 and was the first operational elevated railway line in India. The line was extended to Thirumayilai in 1997. The cost of construction of the first phase between Chennai Beach and Thirumayilai, estimated to be ₹2.8 billion (equivalent to ₹16 billion or US$170 million in 2026), was fully financed by the Government of India. The first phase was projected to serve about 600,000 passengers per day.

=== Phase II ===
RITES conducted further studies in 1987 and 1994 on the effectiveness of the existing public transport system for the growing population. The studies proposed further expansion of the MRTS line. In 1998, the Railway Board sanctioned Phase II of the project from Thirumayilai to Velachery. Part of the Phase II line from Thirumaylai to Thiruvanmiyur was opened on 26 January 2004. It initially consisted of a single line of track for both forward and return journeys. On 19 November 2007, the network was extended from Thiruvanmiyur to Velachery. While the state government gave only the required land for the first phase, it contributed two-thirds of the total project cost of ₹6.91 billion (US$74 million) for the second phase.

=== Phase II extension ===
The construction for the extended second phase of the project connecting Velachery with St. Thomas Mount started in 2008. It was planned at an estimated cost of ₹7.33 billion (US$78 million) with the central government bearing two-thirds of the cost and the state government bearing the rest. The initial planned alignment was altered subsequently and necessitated the demolition of over 70 residential units, which led to protests by the locals. In the Government of India's annual Railway Budget of 2012, it was announced that the line would be commissioned in 2013. In October 2012, Chennai Metropolitan Development Authority (CMDA) resumed the land acquisition for the proposed extension after the Madras High Court vacated its earlier stay order on the same. While land acquisition was completed for the construction of majority of the line by April 2013, there were further delays in acquiring land for about 0.5 km (0.31 mi) of the stretch and the construction of Puzhuthivakkam station. As of 2014, the construction of about 3.7 km (2.3 mi) of the proposed extension was complete.

In May 2014, the High Court ruled that compensation be paid as per newly enacted Land Acquisition Act 2013 on the cases filed by the land owners. In March 2016, the Southern Railway stated that the final phase of the MRTS would take at least 18 months after the state government handed over land to Indian Railways and that it had not yet done so. In 2018, further discussion between the CMDA and the land owners on the compensation to be paid for the land acquisition failed. As of 2019, the Indian Railways had completed the construction of Adambakkam and Puzhuthivakkam elevated stations, with about 0.5 km (0.31 mi) of the line pending for construction. In 2019, the Madras High Court directed the CMDA to pay higher compensation to the land owners. However, the CMDA filed a review petition against the order in the Indian Supreme Court.

The Supreme Court ordered fair compensation for the land owners and directed the CMDA to complete the land acquisition by 8 January 2021. In June 2022, officials announced that the land acquisition for the final stretch would be completed in the next three months. In July 2023, the authorities said that the construction will be completed by the end of the month and the line will be commissioned for use within the end of the year. On 18 January 2024, a concrete girder on the stretch collapsed, which was expected to further delay the opening of the line. Multiple revised deadlines to complete the construction of the final phase were not met. After the construction was completed, trial runs were conducted in the first week of March 2026. Commercial service began on the extended section from 14 March 2026.

=== Future plans ===
The third and fourth phases of the MRTS were initially planned to connect St. Thomas Mount with Villivakkam and Villivakkam with Ennore. The plans have been shelved after the lines overlapped with the proposed extension of the Chennai Metro Rail. In early 2024, a feasibility report was submitted to the state government for a new line from Poonamallee and the planned new airport at Parandur. The 43.63 km (27.11 mi) line would have 19 stations and is expected to cost ₹107.12 billion (US$1.1 billion).

With the Chennai Metro operational since 2015, the Indian Railways proposed for the MRTS system to be taken over by Chennai Metro Rail Limited in 2017. In July 2018, PwC said that the merger would be expensive, costing around ₹30 billion (US$320 million) to replace the train-sets and establish other facilities. On 11 May 2022, the Southern Railway zone of the Indian Railways granted in-principle approval for the takeover. As of July 2024, the take over was still pending as the Indian Railway Board had not approved the same.

== Infrastructure ==
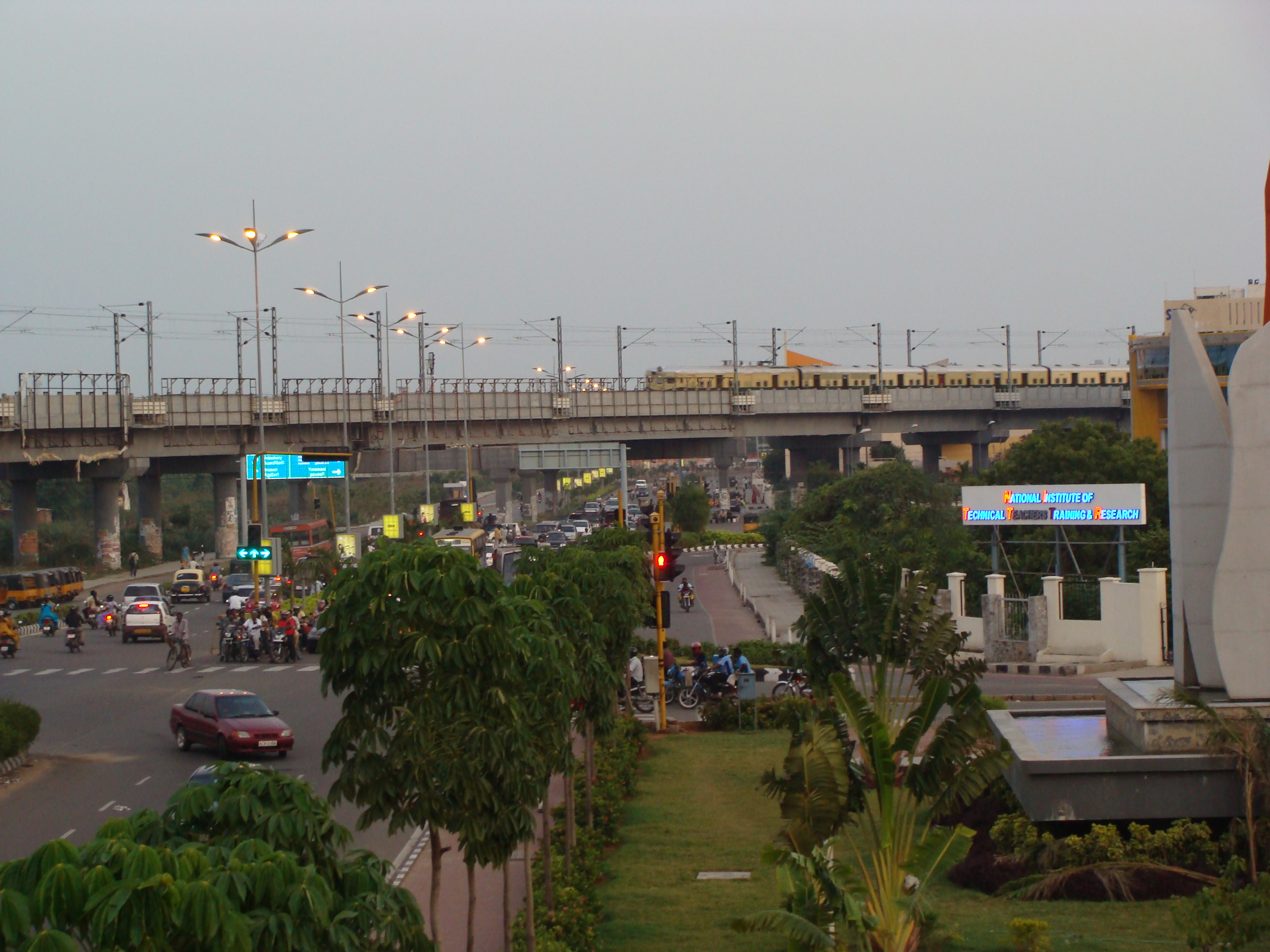
MRTS runs on an elevated course for most of its length. Pictured is the crossing over OMR highway

=== Network and lines ===
Interactive map - Chennai MRTS

The 23.98 km (14.90 mi) line from Chennai Beach to St. Thomas Mount is largely elevated, with a few at-grade sections along the line. The line runs at-grade for 2.4 km (1.5 mi) from Chennai Beach to Park Town, alongside the suburban railway line. From the Park Town station, the line becomes elevated and roughly follows the course of the Buckingham Canal, which runs parallel to the Coromandel Coast. The line remains elevated for the alignment of the second phase up to Perungudi, after which it returns to an at-grade section at the Velachery station, after which the final section of the line from Velachery to St. Thomas Mount is again elevated.

Chennai MRTS network
Phase	Length	Route	Stations	Opening Date
Phase I-A	5.10 km (3.17 mi)	Chennai Beach–Chepauk	5	16 November 1995
Phase I-B	3.63 km (2.26 mi)	Chepauk–Thirumayilai	4	19 October 1997
Phase II-A	5.99 km (3.72 mi)	Thirumayilai–Thiruvanmiyur	6	26 January 2004
Phase II-B	4.62 km (2.87 mi)	Thiruvanmiyur–Velachery	3	19 November 2007
Phase II-B Extension	4.64 km (2.88 mi)	Velachery–St. Thomas Mount	3	14 March 2026

The route taken by the MRTS line has resulted in the pillars of the elevated section of the railway encroaching the Buckingham Canal. Although the pillars were placed basis the approval of the state government, the government later proposed plans to restore the canal to make it navigable. However, as the MRTS pillars have reduced the canal width, a section of the canal is not navigable, and the pillars block the flow of rainwater discharge.

=== Track ===
The Chennai MRTS line bears greater resemblance to the suburban railway than a rapid transit line as it uses the same broad gauge (5 ft 6in) as the Chennai Suburban Railway system, allowing the usage of same train-sets across the existing suburban lines and the MRTS. Ballastless track is used in the elevated sections between Tirumayilai and St.Thomas Mount stations. The trains use 25 kV overhead catenary for traction.

=== Rolling stock ===
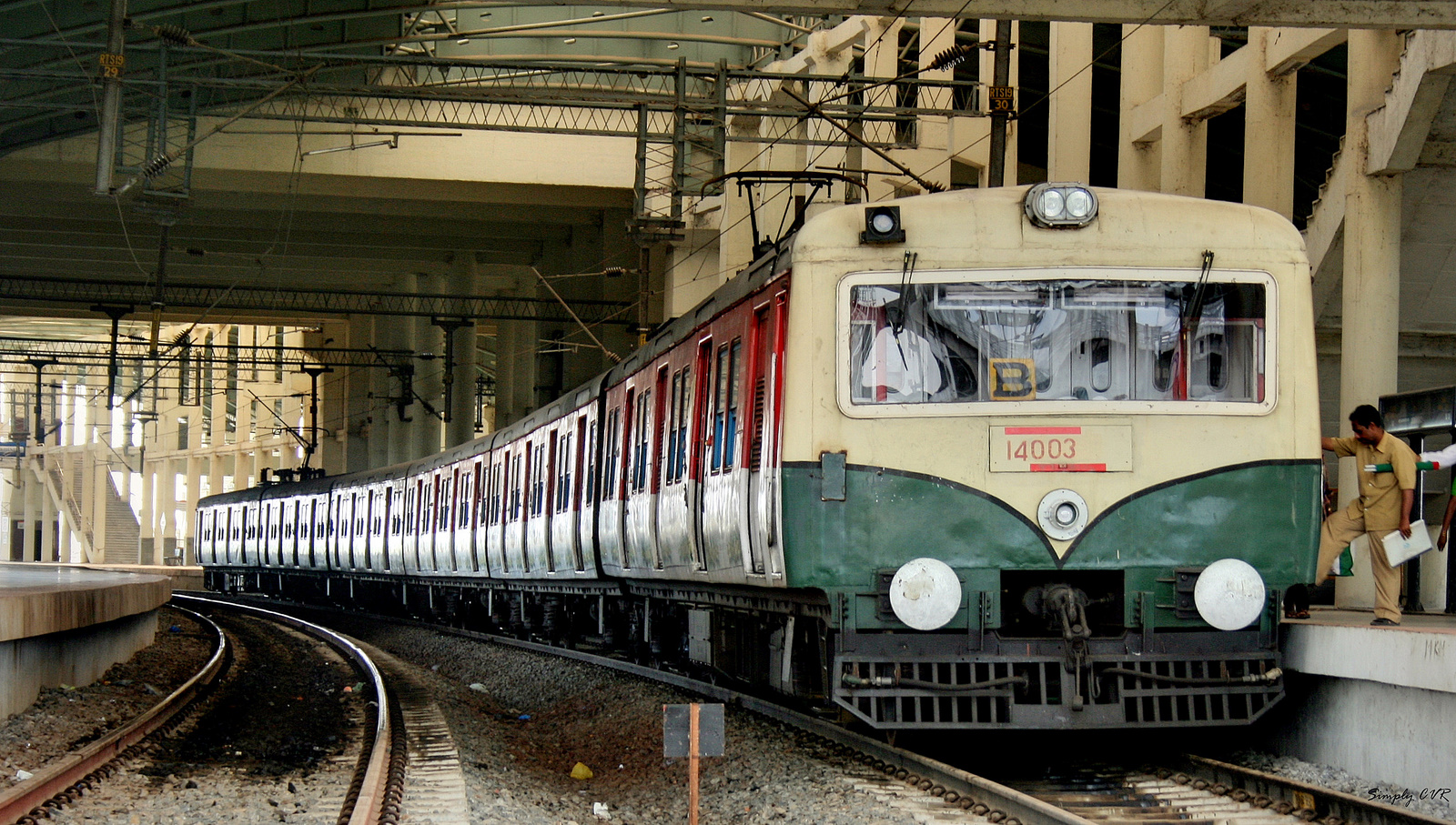
A six car EMU at Velachery station

The Chennai MRTS earlier used six-car electrical multiple unit train sets, which was replaced by nine-car train sets in 2021. A nine-car rake typically has three sets of three motor coaches each at the front, the middle and the last with electric motors used to drive the wheels of the train at a stipulated speed. The EMU coaches are manufactured by the Integral Coach Factory in Chennai. The coaches are not air-conditioned and are equipped with two-class (first and second class) passenger seating configuration.

=== Stations ===
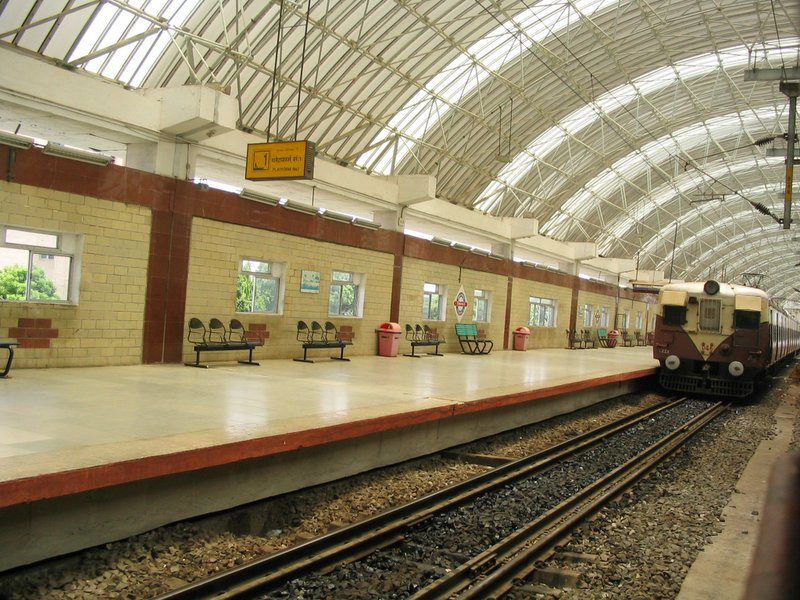
Chintadripet station, one of the stations on the MRTS line

The MRTS line has 21 stations, and the stations are designed to accommodate six and nine-car train rakes.

The Chennai Beach station, one of the termini, is a hub for several suburban trains. Along with the Chennai Fort station, it offers connectivity to the commercial area of Broadway. The Park Town station is located near the Chennai Central station, which is a hub for other suburban lines and for long-distance express trains. The St. Thomas Mount station at the southern end of the line, serves as the intersection of various railway networks. The suburban and long-distance express trains ply on the conventional tracks at ground level, the elevated MRTS line is located at the first level, and the Chennai Metro operates at the second level.

Places of interest such as Parthasarathy Temple, Kapaleeshwarar Temple and Mundagakanniamman Koil are located close to the MRTS railway line. Marina Beach spans along a stretch of the line close to Thiruvallikeni station. The Chepauk station is located close to the M. A. Chidambaram Stadium. The MRTS passes along the Old Mahabalipuram Road (OMR), which also forms part of the information technology corridor where many companies are located.

#	Station name			Distance (km)	Opening	Connections	Layout
#	English	Tamil	Transliteration	Distance (km)	Opening	Connections	Layout
1	Chennai Beach	சென்னை கடற்கரை	Cennaī Kadarkarai	0	16 November 1995	Chennai Beach (South Line)	At-Grade
2	Chennai Fort	சென்னை கோட்டை	Cennaī Kottai	1.70	16 November 1995	Chennai Fort (South Line); Broadway bus terminus	At-Grade
3	Chennai Park Town	சென்னை பூங்கா நகர்	Cennaī Poonga Nagar	2.54	16 November 1995	Chennai Central Park (South Line); Moore Market (North Line) (West Line); Central Blue Line Green Line	At-Grade
4	Chintadripet	சிந்தாதிரிப்பேட்டை	Chinthathrippettah	3.43	16 November 1995	Government Estate Blue Line	Elevated
5	Chepauk	சேப்பாக்கம்	Chepakkam	5	16 November 1995	—N/a	Elevated
6	Thiruvallikeni	திருவல்லிக்கேணி	Thiruvallikeni	5.74	19 October 1997	—N/a	Elevated
7	Light House	கலங்கரை விளக்கம்	Kalangarai Vilakkam	6.95	19 October 1997	—N/a	Elevated
8	Mundagakanniamman Koil	முண்டகக்கண்ணியம்மன் கோவில்	Mundagakanniamman Kovil	7.925	14 May 2014	—N/a	Elevated
9	Thirumayilai	திருமயிலை	Thirumayilai	8.66	19 October 1997	—N/a	Elevated
10	Mandaveli	மந்தைவெளி	Mandaiveli	9.699	26 January 2004	—N/a	Elevated
11	Greenways Road	பசுமைவழிச் சாலை	Pasumaivazhi Salai	11.02	26 January 2004	—N/a	Elevated
12	Kotturpuram	கோட்டூர்புரம்	Kottoorpuram	11.892	26 January 2004	—N/a	Elevated
13	Kasturba Nagar	கஸ்தூரிபாய் நகர்	Kasturibhai Nagar	12.824	26 January 2004	—N/a	Elevated
14	Indira Nagar	இந்திரா நகர்	Indira Nagar	13.796	26 January 2004	—N/a	Elevated
15	Thiruvanmiyur	திருவான்மியூர்	Thiruvanmiyur	14.655	26 January 2004	—N/a	Elevated
16	Taramani	தரமணி	Tharamani	16.57	19 November 2007	—N/a	Elevated
17	Perungudi	பெருங்குடி	Perungudi	17.713	19 November 2007	—N/a	At Grade
18	Velachery	வேளச்சேரி	Velacherry	19.34	19 November 2007	—N/a	At Grade
19	Puzhuthivakkam	புழுதிவாக்கம்	Puzhutivakkam	21.19	14 March 2026	—N/a	Elevated
20	Adambakkam	ஆதம்பாக்கம்	Adambakkam	22.19	TBD	—N/a	Elevated
21	St. Thomas Mount	பரங்கிமலை	Parangimalai	23.98	14 March 2026	St. Thomas Mount Green Line	Elevated

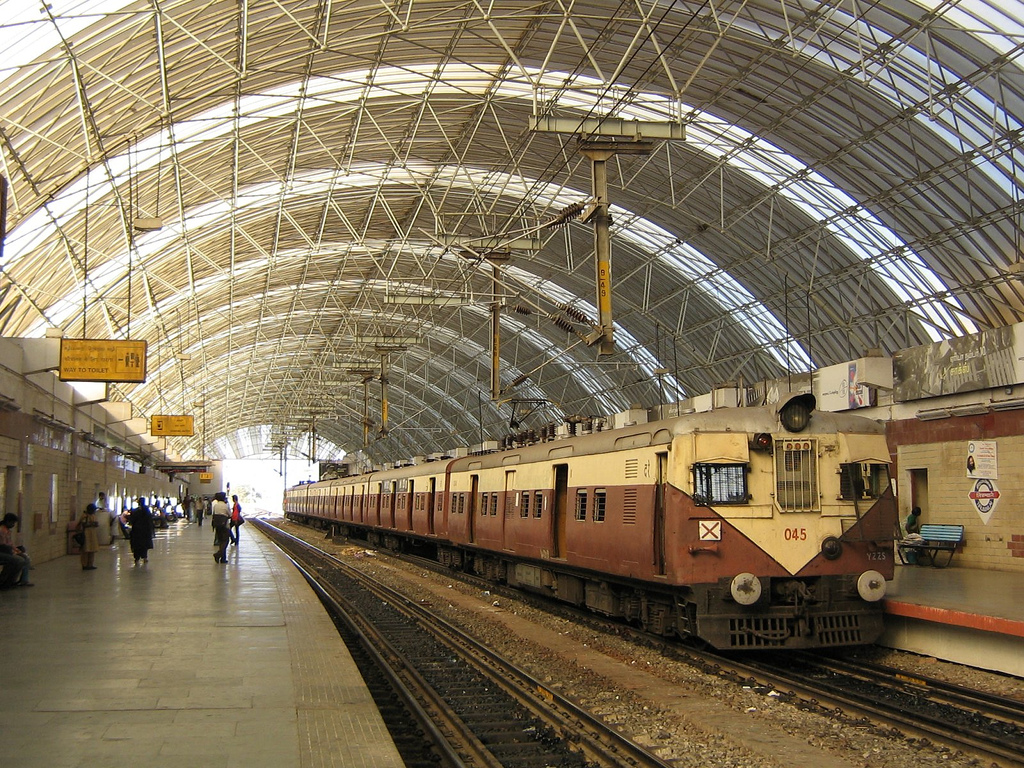
MRTS coaches have open doors on both sides. Pictured is an EMU at Thirumayilai

Indian Railways has made various plans to use the empty space in the MRTS stations. In February 2009, Indian Railway Catering and Tourism Corporation (IRCTC) announced plans to set up food stalls at MRTS stations with the first such stall inaugurated in April 2018 at Thiruvanmiyur station.

MRTS has been criticised by the public for poor maintenance of the stations, lack of inter-modal transport facilities and security issues. The director of Chennai Metro called for the various government agencies to work together to improve the connectivity to the stations. The stations often face issues such as seepage of rainwater and no access to clean drinking water. A 2006 report by the Comptroller and Auditor General of India cited delays in installation of station amenities such as escalators.

In 2012, there was a shortage of the Railway Protection Force personnel at MRTS stations, which raised security concerns. In 2013, to improve the security for the passengers using the network, Indian Railways declared that the MRTS stations would have a single designated entry and exit point as it was difficult for the existing RPF personnel to monitor multiple gates at the same time. If the planned takeover by Chennai Metro is completed, the existing line is planned to be upgraded to be compatible with the metro system. Plans to modernise infrastructure include improved facilities at stations and single integrated ticketing system among others.

== Operations ==
The operational route length between Chennai Beach and St.Thomas Mount is 23.98 km (14.90 mi) with a journey time of more than 65 minutes one way. The system handles about 70 trains on weekdays and reduced capacity on Sundays. In 2012, Indian Railways made the schedule for the MRTS services available on Google Maps on Android smartphones. The trains can be tracked in real time and the users are provided with updates through an automated SMS system.

=== Fares and ticketing ===
The minimum fare for a second class is ₹5 (5.3¢ US). A second class ticket from Beach to St. Thomas Mount is priced at ₹10 (11¢ US). First class tickets cost about five times higher than the second class fare. In addition to one-time tickets, the Southern Railway issues monthly tickets and quarterly season tickets for frequent travelers. Short validity tickets are available for tourists. The tickets can be bought at the railway ticket counters or booked through a mobile application.

=== Patronage ===
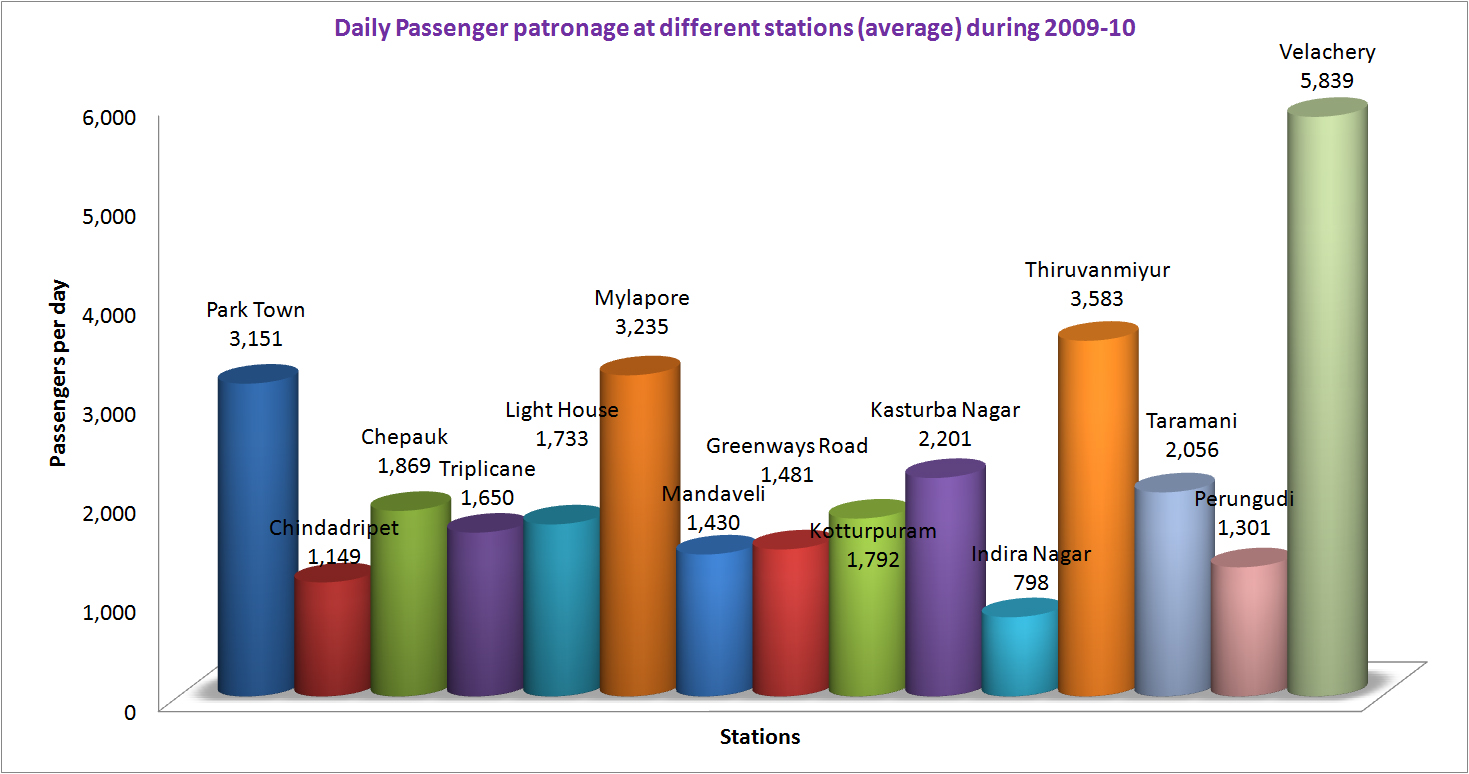
Average daily patronage by station (2009–10)

The ridership of the Chennai MRTS system increased from approximately 9,000 in 2003 to 66,518 passengers per day in 2008. When the line was extended up to Velachery in 2007, the daily ridership increased and it saw a three-fold increase in the revenue. As of 2023, the daily ridership is about 100,000. Three stations—Beach, Thirumayilai, and Velachery—accounted for nearly 40 percent of the ridership in 2012.

In 2010, the Indian Railways rolled out dedicated trains for women, which saw poor patronage. In 2023, Chennai Unified Metropolitan Transport Authority (CUMTA) introduced new plans to improve last-mile connectivity to the stations. Indian Railways operates special trains on certain occasions to boost revenue. As the route passes close to some popular religious sites, the MRTS operates special trains during popular religious festivals such as the Vaikunta Ekadashi at Parthasarathy Temple in Thiruvallikeni and the Arupathumoovar festival at the Kapaleeshwarar Temple in Thirumayilai. Special trains are run when cricket matches are hosted at the M. A. Chidambaram Stadium in Chepauk, during Kaanum Pongal festival at Marina Beach, and during bus strikes.

As the MRTS system is not fully integrated with other modes of transportation in the city, access to the stations is an issue. As per a survey conducted in 2012, the public called for special focus on pedestrian facilities that would provide access to MRTS stations from nearby roads and bus stops, as well as identifying new feeder routes for the network. Post the completion of the under construction extension, the MRTS system will be connected to the Suburban Railway and the Metro. This would enable commuters to access the railway grid of the different operational rail systems and facilitate improved connectivity from the stations on the MRTS network. The proposed extension up to St. Thomas Mount was expected to increase patronage from people working in the IT establishments, residences and other offices located close to the MRTS network, and the ridership increased following the opening of the extended section from Velachery to St. Thomas Mount in March 2026, as it provided access to metro and suburban lines.

=== Finances ===
In a 10 month period in 2009–10, the MRTS earned a revenue of ₹127.6 million (US$1.4 million) with ₹122.1 million (US$1.3 million) coming from ticketing sales. It had operating expenses of about ₹230 million (US$2.5 million), which translated to net loss of more than ₹100 million (US$1.1 million). As of 2023, the MRTS registered revenues of ₹200 million (US$2.1 million) annually. With estimated operational expenses of about ₹1.05 billion (US$11 million), the annual loss widened to ₹0.85 billion (US$9.1 million). A major contributor to the losses is the revenue deficit due to subsidised cheaper fares offered by the Southern Railway, which runs the service.

== See also ==
- Chennai Metrolite
- Rapid transit in India
- Transport in Chennai
