= Kasturba Nagar railway station =

Railway station in Tamil Nadu, India

Kasturibai Nagar Kasturba Nagar
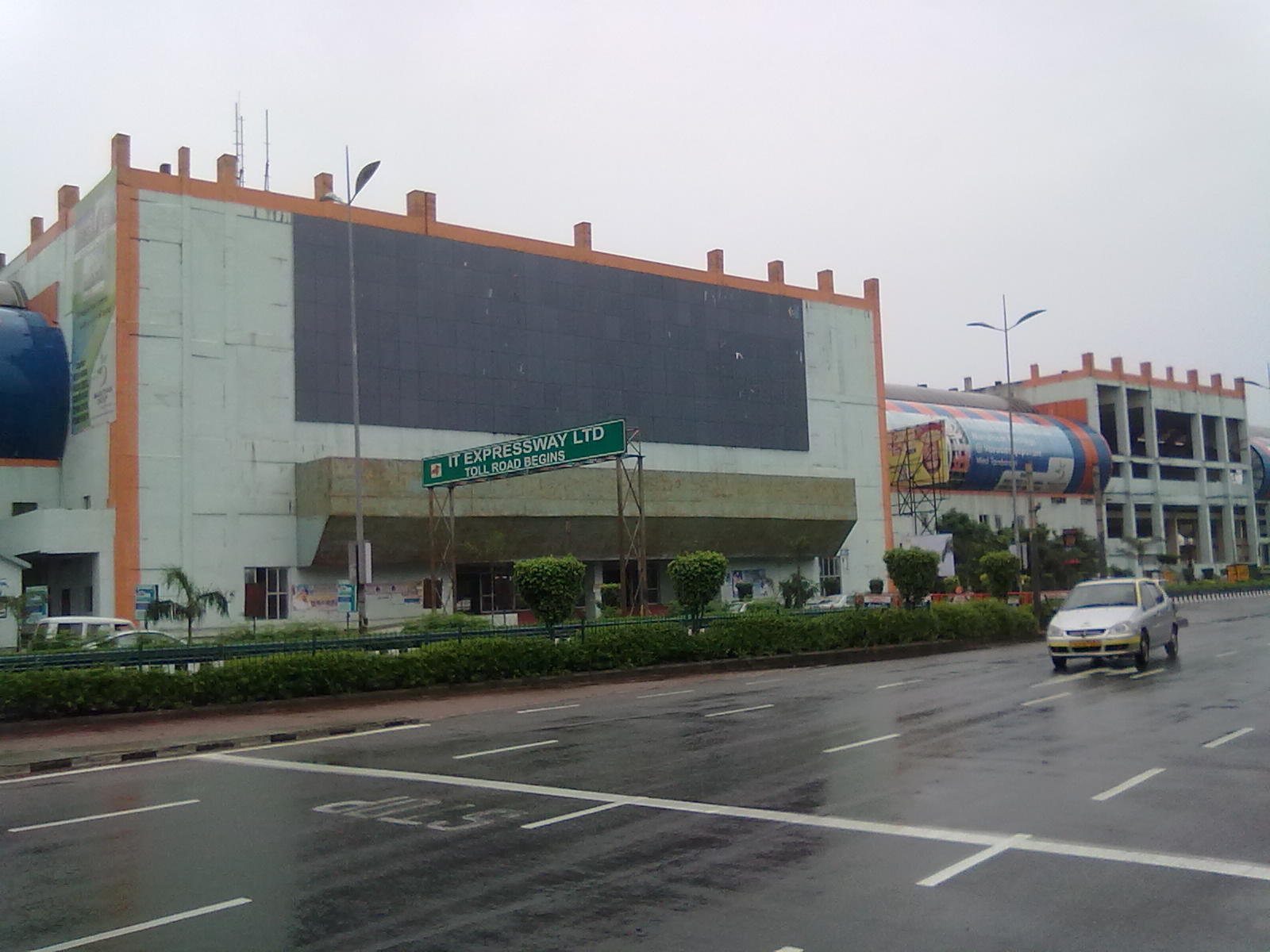
- Kasturba Nagar railway station

General information
- Coordinates: 13°00′20″N 80°14′52″E
- System: Chennai MRTS
- Platforms: Side platform Platform-1 → St. Thomas Mount; Platform-2 → Chennai Beach
- Tracks: 2

Construction
- Structure type: Elevated

Other information
- Station code: KTBR

History
- Opened: 26 January 2004; 22 years ago

Services
Preceding station	Chennai MRTS	Following station
Kotturpuram towards Chennai Beach	Line 1	Indira Nagar towards St. Thomas Mount
Location

Kasturibai Nagar or Kasturba Nagar is a railway station on the Chennai MRTS. Located near the Madhya Kailash junction on Rajiv Gandhi Salai, it exclusively serves the Chennai MRTS.

== History ==
Kasturiba Nagar station was opened on 26 January 2004, as part of the second phase of the Chennai MRTS network. The station was built by Larsen & Toubro.

== Structure ==
The elevated station is built on the western banks of Buckingham Canal. The length of the platform is 280 m. The station building consists of 3,200 sq m of parking area in its basement.

=== Station layout ===
G	Street level	Exit/Entrance
L1	Mezzanine	Fare control, Station ticket counters and Automatic ticket vending machines
L2	Side platform | Doors will open on the left
L2	Platform 2 Northbound	Towards → Chennai Beach; Next Station: Kotturpuram
L2	Platform 1 Southbound	Towards ← St. Thomas Mount; Next Station: Indira Nagar
L2	Side platform | Doors will open on the left
L2

== Service and connections ==
Kasturiba Nagar station is the twelfth station on the MRTS line to St. Thomas Mount. In the return direction from St. Thomas Mount, it is currently the ninth station towards Chennai Beach station.

== See also ==
- Chennai MRTS
- Chennai suburban railway
- Chennai Metro
- Transport in Chennai
