= Sathya Studios =

Indian film studio

Sathya Studios, formerly known as Neptune Studios, was an Indian film studio based in Chennai, Tamil Nadu. It was one of the oldest film studios and was formerly known as "Neptune Studio". The studio was bought by the former Indian actor and Chief Minister of Tamil Nadu, M. G. Ramachandran, who later renamed it Sathya Studios.

== History ==
=== as Lalitha Cinetone and National Theaters Limited ===
Originally started by C. V. Raman, who leased approximately 25 acres of land from the Nawab of Arcot. The property was situated in Adayar with Greenways Road to the north and the Adayar River to the south, bordering Broody Castle.

The monthly rent was Rs. 150, and the purpose was to establish a studio floor for 'Lalitha Cinetone.' However, the production company faced financial troubles and did not produce any movies. Subsequently, the premises were transferred to C. V. Raman's newly established 'National Theaters Limited,' with Kasi Chettiar and R. Prakash as partners. The first production of the studio was the silent film `Vishnu Leela' in 1932 directed by R. Prakash. Later NTL too would plunge into problems and C. V. Raman would launch another production company "Meenakshi Cinetone" to which the studio premises was part of.

=== as Meenakshi Cinetone ===
Meenakshi Cinetone was founded by C. V. Raman with noted Indian businessman and philanthropist AL. RM. Alagappa Chettiar as in the 1930s of the silent movie era the place was bought by noted film maker K. Subrahmanyam who set up Neptune Studios. His other venture Motion Picture Producers Combine. (a.k.a. MPCC) would become Gemini Studios under S. S. Vasan. In 1934, the studio released the Tamil talkie movie "Pavalakodi" marking the debuts of M. K. Thyagaraja Bhagavathar, the first superstar of South India, and its director lawyer-turned-filmmaker, K. Subramaniam and the star-actress, S.D. Subbulakshmi.

=== Under Jupiter Pictures ===
The movie was renamed to "Neptune Studios" and in the mid-1950s the Coimbatore-based Jupiter Pictures leased the studio and relocated their base to Chennai after the lease of Central Studios were over and its owners ceased movie production.

=== As Sathya Studios ===
Neptune Studios was later acquired by the family of M. G. Ramachandran who renamed it Sathya Studios Private Limited. Now a college for Women in the name of Dr. MGR Janaki College of Arts and Science for Women functions there.
