= Greenways Road =

Greenways Road பசுமைவழிச்சாலை
- Neighbourhood
- Location within Chennai Location within Tamil Nadu Location within India
- Coordinates: 13.0219°N 80.2529°E
- Country: India
- State: Tamil Nadu
- District: Chennai District
- Metro: Chennai
- Talukas: Mylapore-Triplicane

Government
  - Body: Chennai Corporation

Languages
  - Official: Tamil
- Time zone: UTC+5:30 (IST)
- PIN: 600028
- Lok Sabha constituency: South Madras
- Vidhan Sabha constituency: Mylapore
- Planning agency: CMDA
- Civic agency: Chennai Corporation
- Website: www.chennai.tn.nic.in

Greenways Road (Tamil: பசுமைவழிச்சாலை) is a road in Chennai, India.

It is lined with the official residences of ministers of Tamil Nadu state government and judges of Chennai High Court. It also houses the Tahsildar district magistrate office of the Mylapore-Triplicane taluk.

A park and memorial named after B. R. Ambedkar, the Tamil Nadu Dr. Ambedkar Law University, Tamil Nadu Judicial Academy, Jesus Calls Prayer Tower, Kutchipudi Art Academy, Tamil Nadu Government Music College (Broodies Castle), Tamil Nadu Human Rights Commission, Anna Institute of Management, Dr. MGR Janaki College of Arts and Science for Women are located on this road.

Part of this road is now renamed after D. G. S. Dinakaran. After the Eliphanstone Bridge (and later Thiru Vi Ka Bridge) was built a new road connecting Adyar to Greenways Road named Adyar Bridge Road (now Dr. Durgabai Deshmuk Road) was formed.

Meenakshi Cinetone, one of the oldest cinema studios in Chennai (later Neptune (Sathya Studios now Sathyabama MGR Maligai)) and Jupiter Studios was also located on this road.

== Transport ==
Greenways Road also boasts a MRTS station on the Beach–Velachery MRTS Line. The Chennai metro rail will pass through the road.
