= Buckingham Canal =

Canal that runs in Andhra Pradesh and Tamilnadu in India

Coordinates: 12.98490°N 80.25270°E

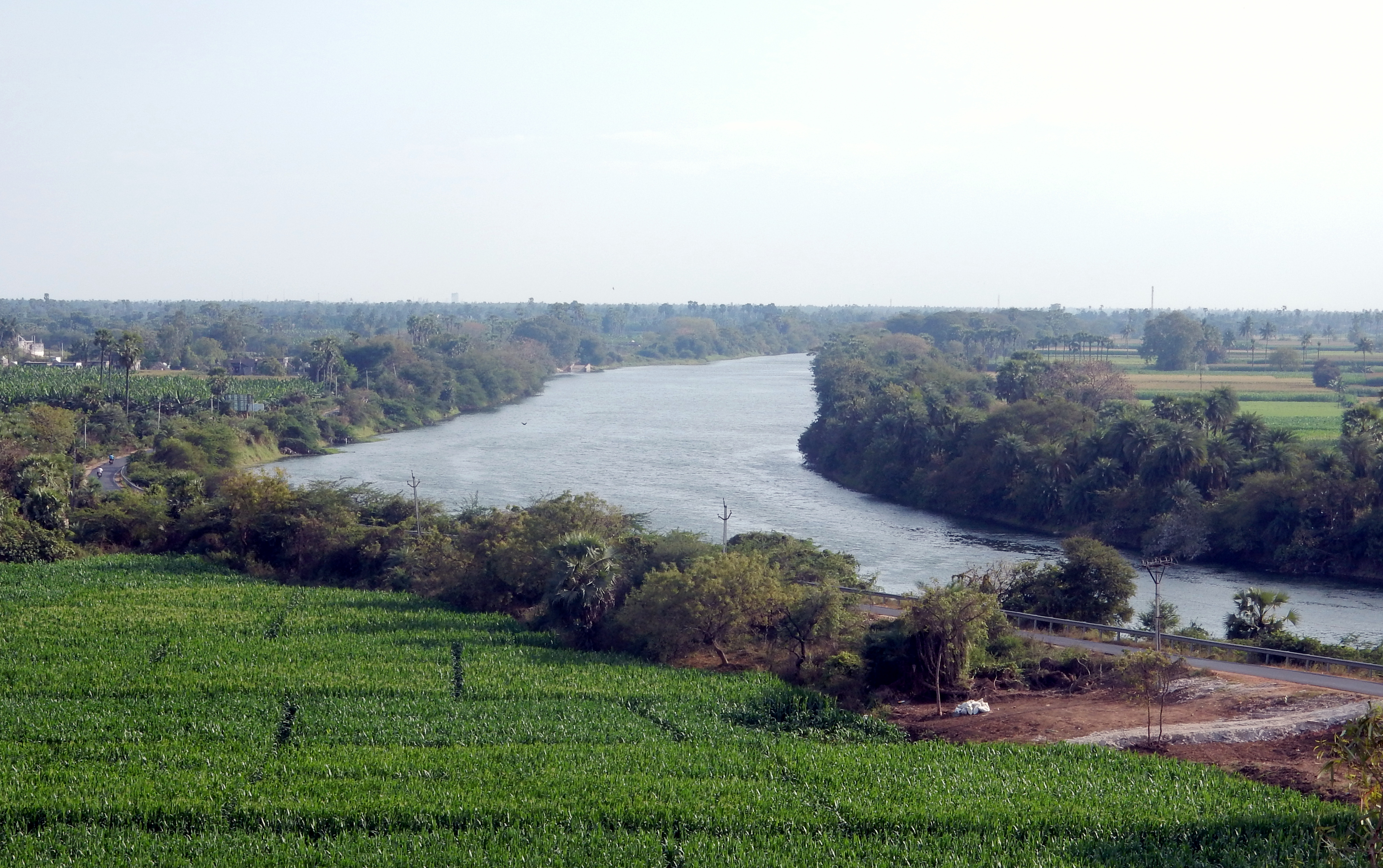
Buckingham Canal near Vijayawada, Andhra Pradesh

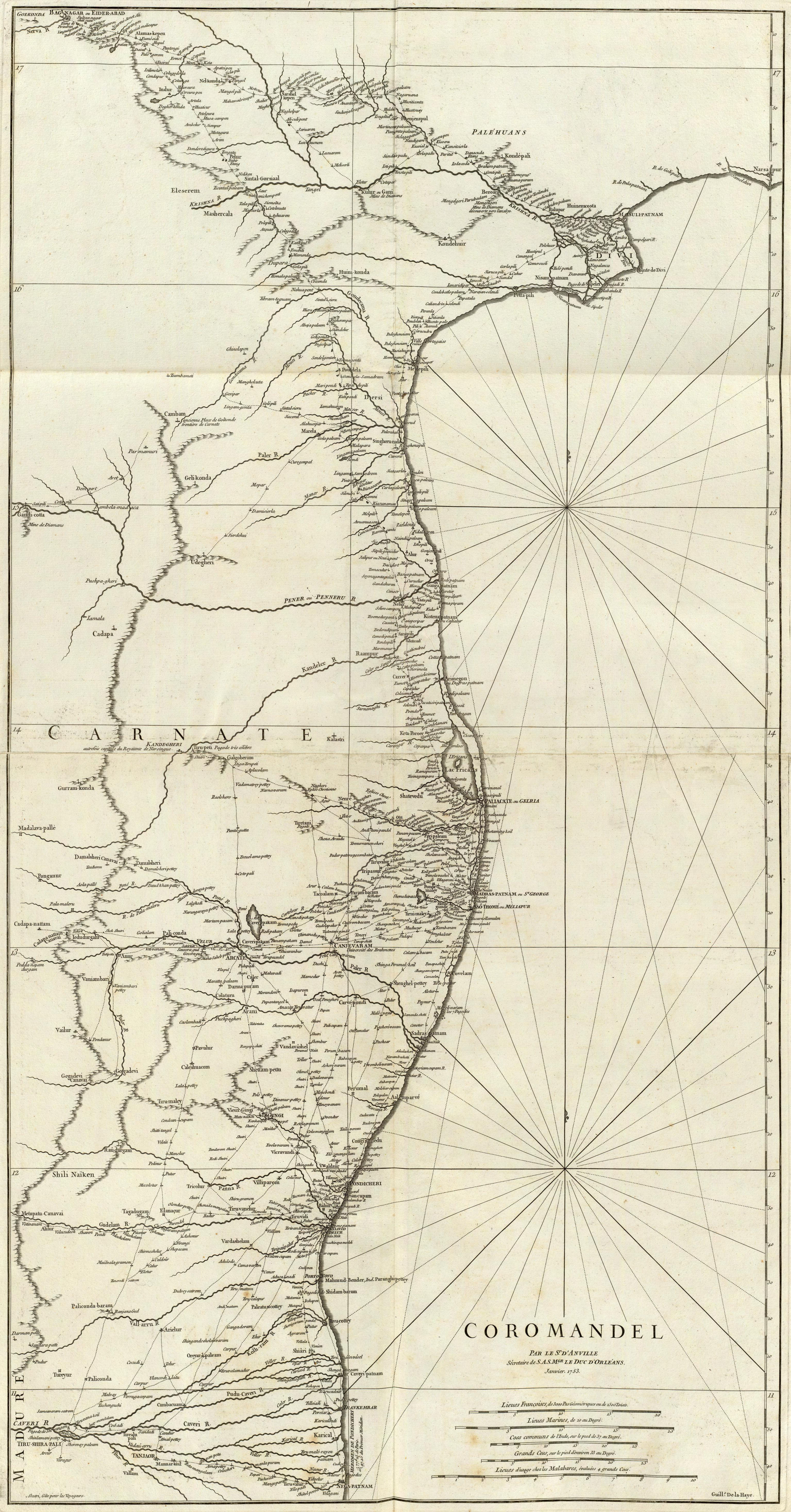
Map of the Coromandel Coast with the Buckingham Canal (French)

The Buckingham Canal is a 796 kilometres (494.6 mi)-long fresh water navigation canal, that parallels the Coromandel Coast of South India from Kakinada of Andhra Pradesh to Pichavaram near Chidambaram of Tamil Nadu. The canal connects most of the natural backwaters along the coast to Chennai (Madras) port.

The canal was constructed during British rule, and was an important waterway during the late nineteenth and early twentieth centuries. Competition from rail and later road transport diminished its importance, and during the 20th century portions became unusable and badly polluted. More recently there is increased interest in the canal's potential to protect coastal communities from flooding by tsunamis and cyclones as well as provide a navigable waterway, and projects have been undertaken to restore and improve the canal.

In the Dravida Munnetra Kazhagam party's 2021 election manifesto, the party promised that the canal will be rehabilitated.

== Construction ==
The first segment of the canal was a saltwater navigation canal, constructed in 1806 from Madras to Ennore for a distance of 18 km (11 mi). It was initially called Cochrane's Canal, after its principal financier Basil Cochrane. Subsequently, it was extended north to Pulicat Lake, 40 km (25 mi) north of Chennai. The canal was taken over by the government of Madras Presidency in 1837 and further extended, ultimately reaching 315 km (196 mi) north of Chennai to Gudivada Kalava on the banks of the Krishna River in Andhra Pradesh, and 103 km (64 mi) south of Chennai to Marakkanam in Tamil Nadu. It was briefly renamed Lord Clive's Canal. However, the section in Chennai was known as Cochrane's Canal for much of the 19th century.

During 1877 and 1878, the people of Chennai suffered from the terrible Great Famine and more than six million people perished. The 8 km (5 mi) stretch, linking the Adyar and Cooum rivers, was built in 1877–78 at a cost of ₹3 million (equivalent to ₹1.1 billion or £8.7 million in 2026) as a famine relief work. The canal was named the Buckingham Canal in 1878 because the link, was built on the orders of the then Governor, the Duke of Buckingham and Chandos.

The canal lost its importance for many years as a result of the competition of the railways, and regained its importance after the Second World War. One of the works undertaken in the Second Five Year Plan was the development of the Buckingham Canal, including linking the canal with Madras harbour, with a contribution of Rs. 115 lakhs by the Central Government. This work was considered necessary to conserve an existing asset serving as an inter-state waterway supplementing the railway capacity and providing a useful means of transport for large quantities of goods between the States of Andhra and Madras.

== Course of the canal ==
The canal runs approximately 1 km (0.62 mi) back from the coastline. It joins up a series of natural backwaters, and fed by tidal waters from the sea through rivers and creeks. The Cooum River connects the canal to the Bay of Bengal in the center of Chennai. The portion north of the Cooum is known as the North Buckingham Canal, and the portion south of the Cooum as the South Buckingham Canal. 257 km (160 mi) of the canal is in Andhra Pradesh, and 163 km (101 mi) is in Tamil Nadu. Approximately 31 km (19 mi) is within the city limits of Chennai. In Andhra Pradesh it joins the Cammamar Canal at the Krishna delta, just north of Pallipalem which in turn is connected with the canals of the Godavari delta. The complete inter-connected system presents a continuous 400 miles of navigable channel along the coast.

Variations in canal width between Cooum and Adyar rivers (Source: HSCTC feasibility report)
Stretch	Original (survey) width (m)		Existing width (m)	
Stretch	Minimum	Maximum	Minimum	Maximum
Adyar River–Greenways Road	107	116	25	31
Greenways Road–Kamaraj Salai	115	123	25	33
Kamaraj Salai–Venkatakrishna Road	98	123	33	48
Venkatakrishna Road–St. Mary's Road	122	123	37	38
St. Mary's Road–Agraharam Road	133	143	28	38
Agraharam Road–Kutchery Road	113	117	33	37
Kutchery Road–P.V.Koil Street	114	134	34	39
P.V.Koil Street–Radhakrishna Street	117	133	25	38
Radhakrishna Street–Avvai Shanmugam Salai	120	122	30	32
Avvai Shanmugam Salai–Besant Road	100	109	25	34
Besant Road–Barathi Salai	89	110	24	25
Barathi Salai–Wallaja Road	80	111	30	36
Wallaja Road–Swami Sivanandha Salai	42	73	32	36
Swami Sivanandha Salai–Cooum River	80	93	25	28

== Decline in usage ==
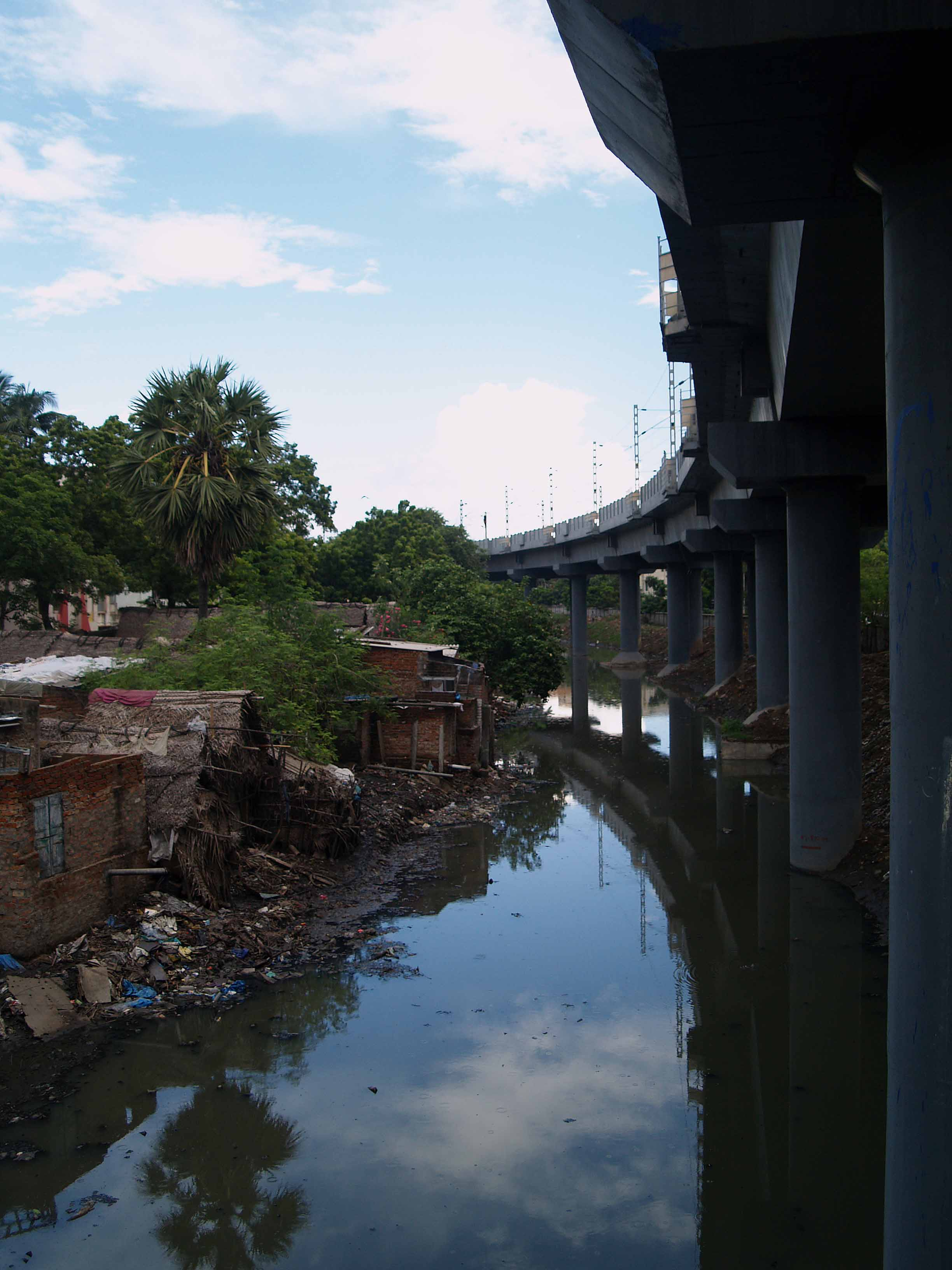
Section of the Canal near RA Puram with MRTS

The canal was used to convey goods up and down the coast from Vijayawada to Madras (now Chennai). The cyclones of 1965/1966 and 1976 damaged the canal, and it is little used and no longer well maintained. Within the city of Chennai the canal is badly polluted from sewage and industrial effluents, and the silting up of the canal has left the water stagnant, creating an attractive habitat for malaria-spreading mosquitoes. The North Chennai Thermal Power Station (NCTP) discharges hot water and fly ash into the canal. In agricultural areas south of Chennai, the former tow path along the scenic areas is used for light motorcycle and bicycle traffic. On 1 January 2001 the Government of India launched a project to prevent sewage discharge into the canal and Chennai's other waterways, and to dredge the canal to remove accumulated sediment and improve water flow.

Within the city limits of Chennai much of the canal has been used as the route of the elevated Chennai Mass Rapid Transit System (MRTS). MRTS stations such as Kotturpuram, Kasturba Nagar and Indira Nagar have encroached on the canal and narrowed the width of the canal to less than 50 meters in a few places.

Buckingham Canal is the most polluted of the three major waterways in the city with nearly 60 per cent of the estimated 55 million litres of untreated sewage being let into it daily, including by Chennai Metropolitan Water Supply and Sewerage Board.

== Effect of the 2004 tsunami ==
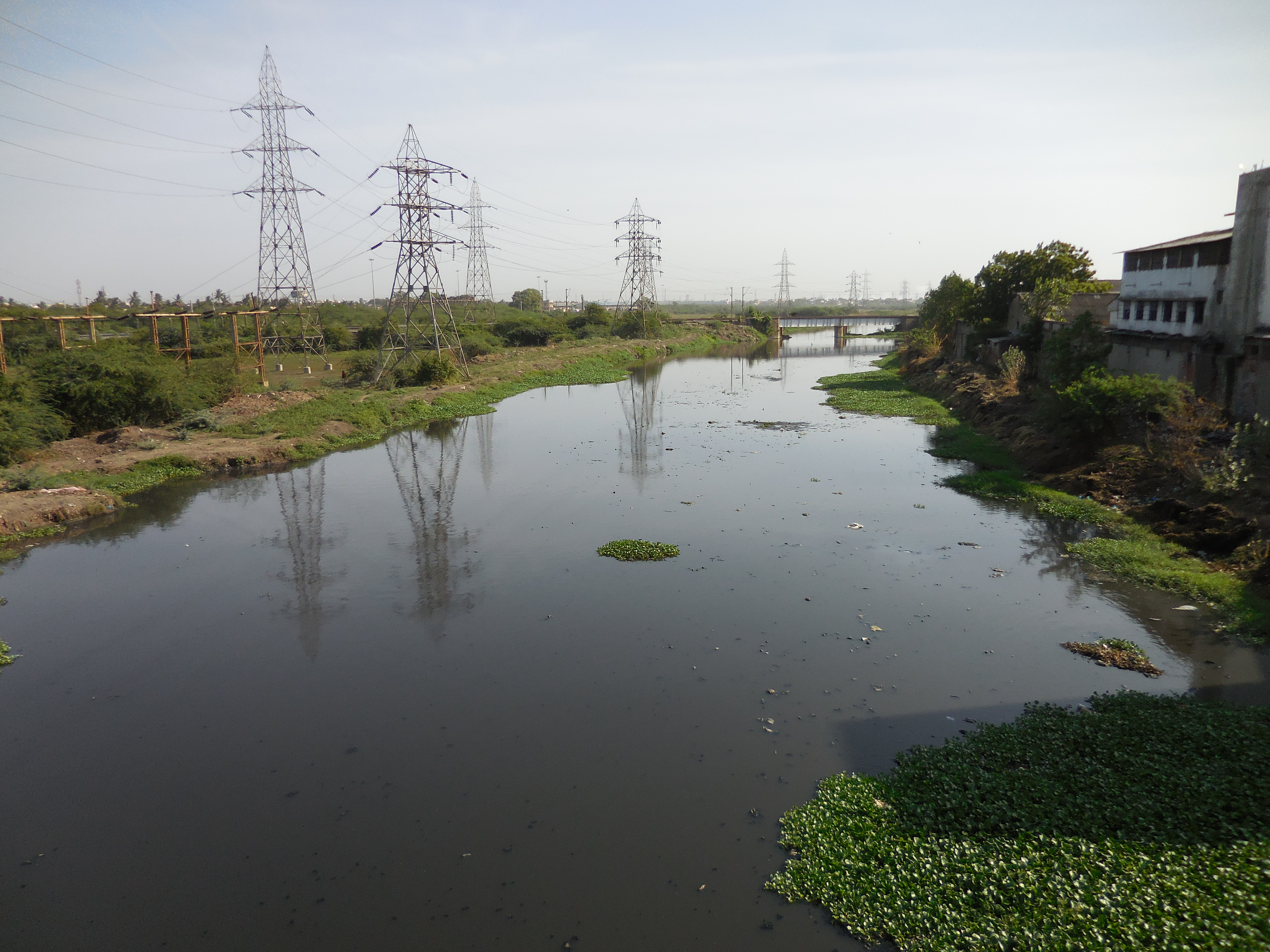
The canal at one of its most polluted forms, near Korukkupet

Dr. B. Ramalingeswara Rao first identified the buffer zone action of the Buckingham Canal when he visited the coastal areas of 300 kilometres (186.4 mi). He recommended to the Government to renovate it to mitigate tsunami hazards in the future. Further, he reported in 2005, during the 2004 Indian Ocean tsunami or also known as the 2004 Boxing Day Tsunami, the Buckingham Canal acted as a buffer zone and regulated the tsunami waves on the coastal region over nearly 310 kilometres (192.6 mi) from Pedda Ganjam to Chennai. The canal all along the coast was filled with tsunami water, which overflowed at a few places and receded back to sea within 10-15 min. This helped save the lives of several fishermen, especially in coastal Andhra Pradesh and parts of Chennai city and also helped in clearing of the aquaculture debris. The natural growth of vegetation on either side of the canal, has had an effect in tsunami mitigation; for example in Vakadu Mandal at villages like Pudikappam, Srinivasapuram and Tudipalem, the damage was minimal.

Dr. B. R. Rao further stressed on the extension of the Buckingham Canal up to Vedaranyam in order to protect the Tamil Nadu coast from the fury of tsunamis in future. The maximum magnitude M_{W} 8.5 may occur in future in Sumatra because of its continuous subduction activity.

== Cause of 2015 floods ==
Buckingham canal drains water from south Chennai. A 2014 CAG report revealed that a diversion channel from Buckingham canal near Okkiyum Maduvu to the sea (drain project under JNNURM scheme) could have saved south Chennai from flooding. But the government dropped the 100 crore JNNURM scheme, which if completed, would have drained flood water at 3,500 cubic feet per second from southern neighborhoods. The 2014 CAG report said defective planning of flood control projects caused delay and increased cost, defeating the objective of the scheme. "The fact is that alleviation of inundation of flood water in Chennai city remains largely un-achieved," it said.

== Revamp of the canal ==
Map of Chennai City showing the Buckingham Canal. The Canal runs perpendicular to Coovum and Adayar rivers.

Revival of Buckingham Canal took shape by government's National Waterway 4 (NW-4) declaration in November 2008. Both North Buckingham (Peddaganjam, Ongole-Chennai) and south Buckingham (basin bridge, Chennai - Marakkanam) canal will be developed under the proposed National Waterway 4 by Inland Waterways Authority of India. Periodically, government of Tamil Nadu also takes up dredging and widening of the canal through Water Resources Department, Public Works Department (PWD). With the provisions of State-Center shared Jawaharlal Nehru National Urban Renewal Mission (JNNURM), PWD has started widening the South Buckingham Canal from Okkiyam Madu to Muttukadu for a stretch of 13.5 kilometres (8.4 mi) About ₹1,447.91 crore (US$150 million) has been allocated under the JNNURM for integrated development of waterways and macro drainages like Buckingham canal, Otteri Nullah, Virugambakkam – Arumbakkam drain, Cooum and Adyar river. Despite the development, the central section of the canal running through the most congested areas of Chennai, a length of 7.1 kilometres (4.4 mi) will remain unnavigable due to severe encroachments and construction of the Chennai Mass Rapid Transport System.

On 22 January 2010, Government of Tamil Nadu has reconstituted the Adayar Poonga Trust as Chennai River Restoration Trust for restoration of Chennai rivers (Adayar river, Cooum river) including the Buckingham Canal.

In 2011 improvements were being undertaken on the 13 km (8.1 mi) stretch between Okkiyam Madu and Muttukadu under the Jawaharlal Nehru National Urban Renewal Mission. The canal was being widened to 100 m (330 ft) and a U.S.A.-built dredge was being used to deepen the canal to 2.4 m (8 ft). Also under this project, six small causeways across the canal would be reconstructed into single-lane bridges.

== Bridges connecting ECR and OMR ==
In 2018, the Chennai Corporation proposed to construct six bridges across the canal, linking East Coast Road and Old Mahabalipuram Road, along a length of 4.5 kilometers of the canal. They include Venkatesapuram–Elango Nagar (costing ₹46.3 million), Venkatesapuram–Gandhi Road (costing ₹46.2 million), Kamarajar Salai–Veeramani Salai (costing ₹60 million), Maniammai Street–Dr. Ambedkar Salai (costing ₹96.6 million), Pandian Street–Anna Nagar (costing ₹62.1 million), and Gandhi Nagar–Pandian Nagar (costing ₹52.9 million).

== See also ==
- National Waterway 4
- Adyar river
- Cooum river
- Indian Rivers Inter-link
- Kosasthalaiyar river
- Water management in Chennai
- Buckingham Canal, Kollam
- List of most-polluted rivers

== Other sources ==
- "Buckingham canal buffered tsunami fury". The Hindu. Chennai, India. 11 August 2005. Archived from the original on 13 March 2007.
- "The desecrated link". The Hindu Sep 23, 2002. Hindu Group. Archived from the original on 7 May 2005.
- B. Ramalingeswara Rao (2005). Buckingham Canal saved people in Andhra Pradesh (India) from the tsunami of 26 December 2004. Current Science vol. 89, pp. 12–13.
