= Chennai Beach railway station =

Railway station in Chennai, India

Chennai Beach Chennai Kadarkkarai
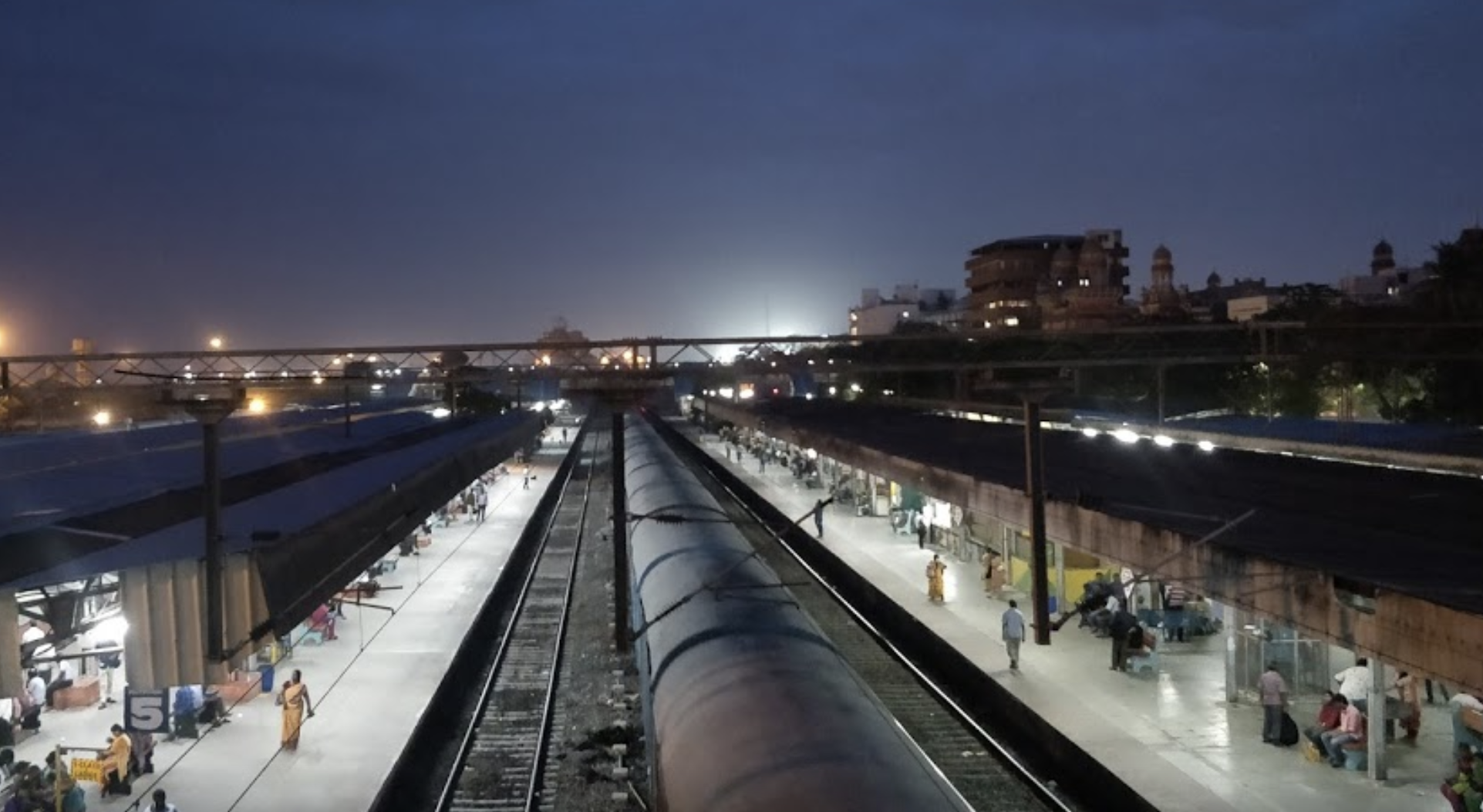
- Passengers waiting for a suburban train at the station

General information
- Location: Rajaji Salai, Chennai, Tamil Nadu 600 001, India
- Coordinates: 13°05′32″N 80°17′31″E
- System: Chennai Suburban Railway; Chennai MRTS
- Owner: Ministry of Railways, Indian Railways
- Lines: South, South West and West South lines of Chennai Suburban Railway; MRTS Line 1; Chennai Egmore–New Delhi
- Platforms: 10
- Tracks: 13

Construction
- Structure type: Standard on-ground station
- Parking: Available

Other information
- Status: Active
- Station code: MSB
- Fare zone: Southern Railways

History
- Opened: 1928
- Electrified: 11 May 1931
- Former names: South Indian Railway (Madras and Southern Mahratta Railway)

Passengers
- 3,00,000 per day

Services
Preceding station	Chennai MRTS	Following station
Terminus	Line 1	Chennai Fort towards St. Thomas Mount
Preceding station	Chennai Suburban	Following station
Terminus	South Line	Chennai Fort towards Tambaram, Chengalpattu Junction or Villupuram Junction
Location
- Location within Chennai Location within Tamil Nadu Location within India

Chennai Beach (formerly known as Madras Beach) (station code: MSB) is a railway terminus of the Southern Railway network in Parry's Corner, Chennai, India. Built on reclaimed land, the station serves the suburban services of the Chennai Suburban Railway and Mass Rapid Transit System (Chennai) and a few passenger trains. It serves as the northern terminus for the Chennai MRTS line. The station is named after High Court Beach, which was later built up as part of Chennai Port, and not after the Marina Beach, which is located a few kilometres away and is served by Chepauk, Triplicane and Lighthouse stations of the MRTS line. The station consists of 1500 square metres of open parking area.

The station is located adjacent to the High Court and Broadway. There is also Burma Bazaar, which sells foreign merchandise in small shops outside of the station. Most of the government offices and headquarters of some banks, and Parry Group's offices are also located near the station.

In addition to being a focal terminus for much of Chennai's rail network, the station is also a major bus transportation hub for passengers destined to north and northwest Chennai. Most of these local buses are situated near the station.

It acts as the access point for Chennai port for the port employees.

== History ==
With the development of the port, the surrounding areas were reclaimed and railway lines to connect the port were laid on the reclaimed land with a station built on it. Until the introduction of the electric trains, the city had the single steam rail line between Harbour and Tambaram, used by both passenger and goods trains. The plan to electrify railway lines in Madras was first initiated in 1923 by Sir Percy Rothera, an agent of the South Indian Railways, who felt the need for such a service. This was in a time when the city was expanding, with largely agricultural areas such as Saidapet, St. Thomas Mount and Tambaram developing into residential quarters. However, the plan was realised only in the following decade. Plan to build a new line between Beach and Egmore and two lines between Egmore and Tambaram was announced as part of the suburban remodelling initiative of South Indian Railways. On 27 December 1930, the first consignment of 25 electric carriages from England was received by the railway. The trains were painted in dull green with a black wheel base and featured wide sliding doors, a better-designed seating arrangement, and thick glass fronts. The new carriages were parked in Tambaram station.

The first electrically operated rail service in Madras began on 2 April 1931 between Madras Beach and Tambaram, which became the earliest metre gauge to be electrified in the country. It was launched by Sir George Fredrick Stanley, the then governor of Madras, who was reported to have said at the opening ceremony that the new train services would transform "desolate south Madras into burgeoning garden cities". However, the service was opened to the public only a month later on 11 May 1931. The Madras Electricity Supply Corporation, which powered the railway lines, was aided by sub-stations in Egmore and Meenambakkam. Soon, the number of trains shuttling passengers was increased to 45 a day, running every 10 minutes at peak hours, and every 30 minutes, otherwise. The running time between Madras Beach and Tambaram stations, which was 2 hours until then, was reduced to 49 minutes. The train service was made available from 4:00 in the morning up to 12:00 at night.

The station was controlled by power-operated signalling from a cabin. When the double metre-gauge line from the station up to Tambaram was electrified in 1931 with the 1,500 V DC overhead system, automatic signalling was provided between the station and Madras Egmore. However, it does not signal the broad-gauge line of the Madras and Southern Mahratta Railway from Rayapuram, which also serves the station. The single line to Rayapuram was controlled by the Theobald's Token instrument, invented by an engineer of the Madras Railway and manufactured locally in the city by a firm named Orr & Co, which was used extensively on the lines of both the Madras and Southern Mahratta Railway and the South Indian Railway. It was housed in the station office. The signalling of the station is controlled from Siemens all-electric power frame of 1935.

A subway connecting South Beach Road with North Beach Road near the station before Parry's Corner was built in 1967. In 1978, the Beach Station subway was built. The cabin was closed and demolished in August 2002 during remodelling of the station layout in view with the gauge conversion of the lines.

== Location ==
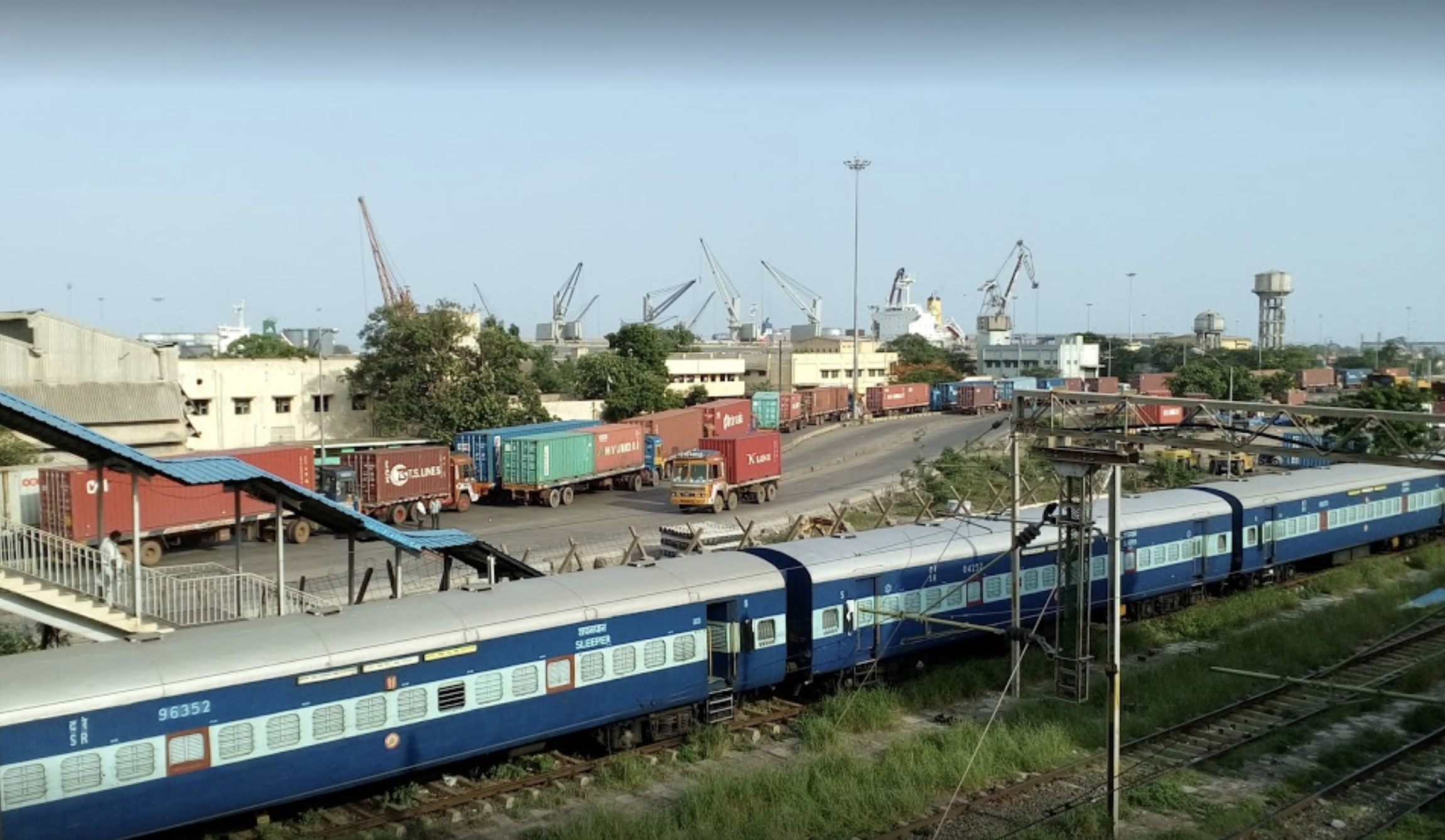
Chennai Beach Station Port

Built on a reclaimed land, the terminus lies on the far-eastern tip of the city, abutting the harbour coast. It is located in the historical neighbourhood of Georgetown and serves as the converging point of the northern and southern lines of the railways, making it the de facto focal point of the Chennai Suburban Railway Network. The terminus is located about 21 km (13 mi) from Chennai International Airport. The station premises is bordered by Rajaji Salai on the west and Chennai Port on the east. The main entrance is located on Rajaji Salai opposite General Post Office. The station is connected with Chennai Port by means of a footbridge.

== Passenger facilities ==
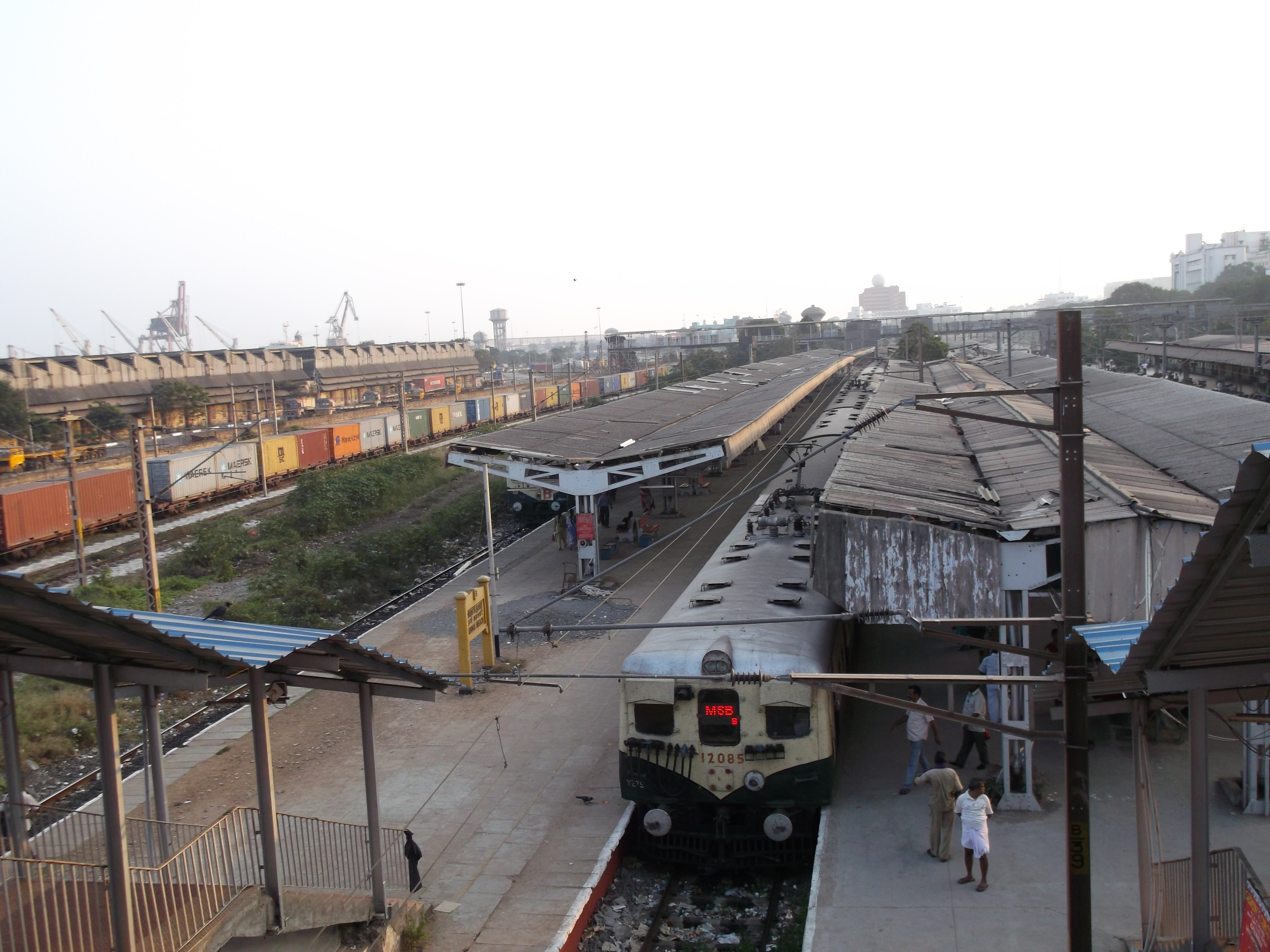
Passenger area of the station

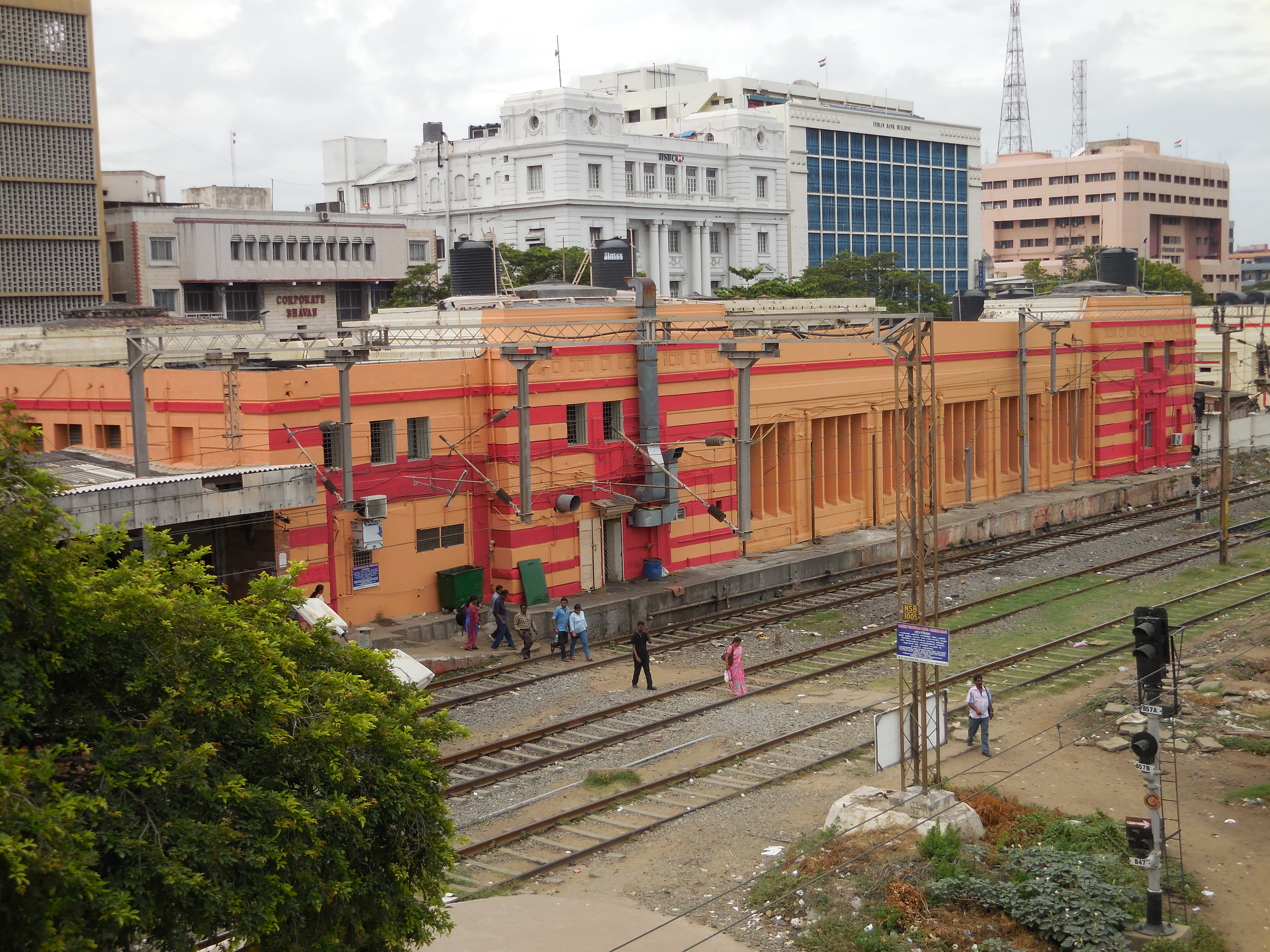
Main Building of Chennai Beach Railway Station in 2014

There are two footbridges in the station, one each at the northern and the southern ends of the station, connecting platforms 4 through 8. The footbridge at the southern end extends into the Chennai Port, connecting the harbour with the railway station.

A project to extend one of the footbridges in the station over the Rajaji Salai on the western side was mooted in 2009–2010 at a cost of ₹5.2 million, and the foundation stone was laid in February 2011. The extension will be 33 metres long crossing the Rajaji Salai to reach the State Bank of India's new building complex.

A new reservation centre with ten reservation counters and a huge visitor's hall was built in 2013 from the general funds under the Railway Scheme. However, the centre has not yet been opened to public.

== Projects and development ==
It is one of the 73 stations in Tamil Nadu to be named for upgradation under Amrit Bharat Station Scheme of Indian Railways. In 2013, Chennai Corporation planned larger bus bays outside the station on Rajaji Salai after evicting about 41 shops along the pavement. The bus bays were being planned to hold at least three buses at a time, inside the existing bus stop. Ten years later, in 2023, a 4.3-km-long 4th line between Chennai Beach and Egmore (doubling work) has been started; it is slated to be completed in 7 months.

== Services ==
Chennai Beach station is one of the busiest railway stations in the city. Around 400 trips are operated from the station every day. This includes close to 250 services in the Beach–Tambaram–Chengalpattu sector and 134 services in the Beach—Velachery MRTS sector, in addition to services to Gummidipoondi and Ennore in the north and Avadi, Pattabiram, Tiruvallur, and Thiruttani in the west, and the less-frequent services to Chennai Central. The station sees close to 100,000 passengers every day using the city's suburban rail network, with more than 40,000 commuters buying tickets from the station every day. On an average, about 1,500 commuters book tickets every day at the passenger reservation counters at the station, with a revenue generation of around ₹250,000 per day.

== Security ==
In 2012, the station was brought under the ₹400-million Integrated Security Surveillance System (ISSS) project, when the first phase of the project was implemented in July 2012. The project, implemented jointly by the Southern Railways and HCL Infosystems, includes installation of CCTV cameras that would record visuals around the clock and store the data for 30 days. A total of 16 CCTV cameras have been installed at the station at a cost of ₹4.557 million, and footage will be transmitted and stored using an Internet Protocol system. The control room is located at the Railway Protection Force inspector's office on the first floor, with two 42-inch high-definition LCD TVs.

== See also ==
- Chennai Suburban Railway
- Railway stations in Chennai
