= Ambattur (disambiguation) =

Ambattur is a neighbourhood of north-west Chennai, Tamil Nadu, India.

Ambattur may also refer to these related to the Chennai neighbourhood:

- Ambattur (state assembly constituency), is a state assembly constituency.
- Ambattur division, a revenue division
- Ambattur taluk, a subdistrict of Chennai
- Ambattur Lake
- Ambattur Industrial Estate, a specially designated industrial area
- Ambattur railway station
