= Thirumullaivoyal =

Neighbourhood in Tiruvallur district, Tamil Nadu, India

Thirumullaivayal
- Neighborhood
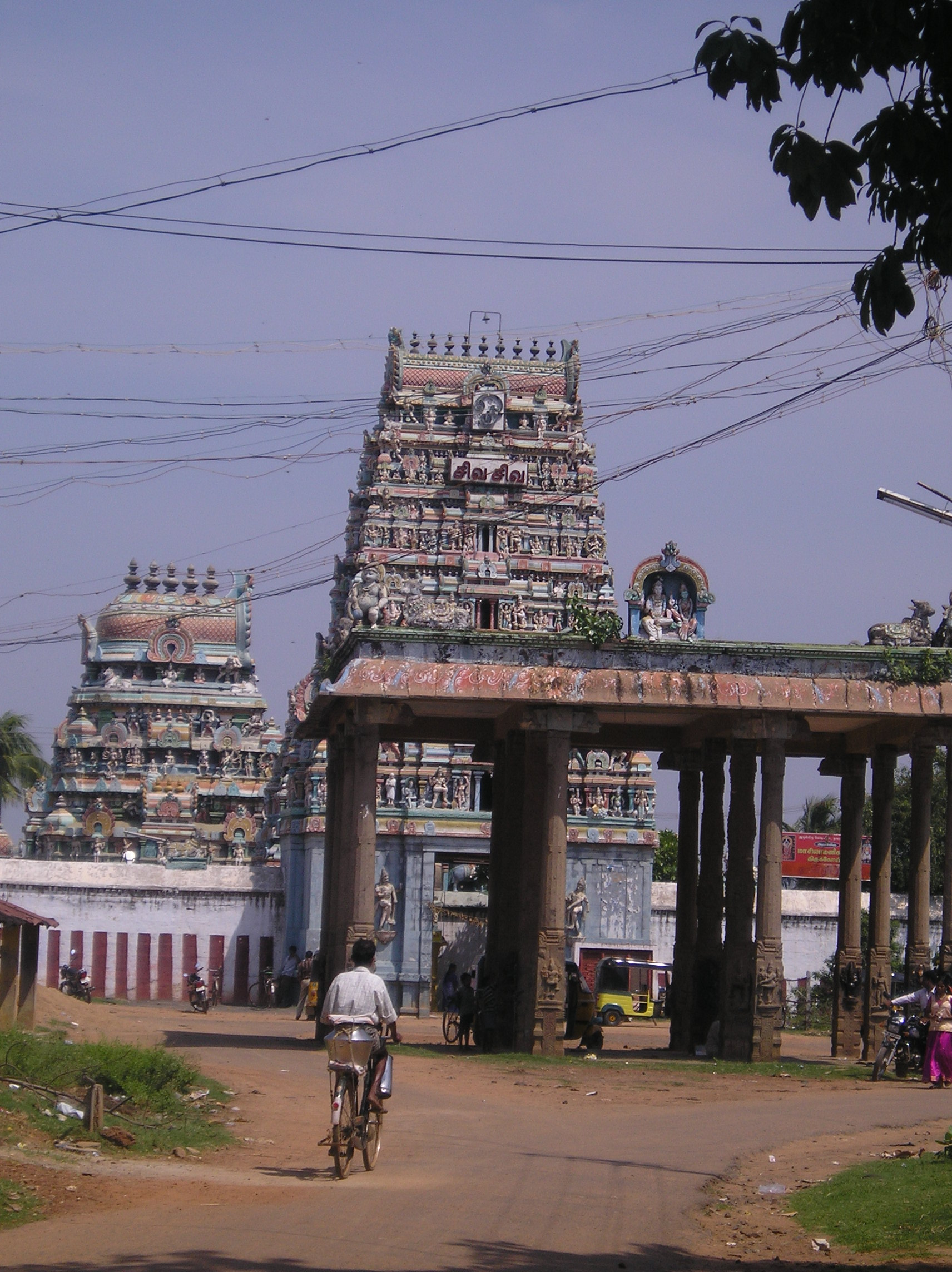

- Location within Chennai Location within Tamil Nadu Location within India
- Coordinates: 13.13183°N 80.13082°E
- Country: India
- State: Tamil Nadu
- District: Tiruvallur
- Zone: Avadi
- Metro: Chennai

Languages
  - Official: Tamil
- Time zone: UTC+5:30 (IST)
- PIN: 600 062
- Vehicle registration: TN 13
- Website: municipality.tn.gov.in/avadi/abs_Municipality.htm

Thirumullaivoyal is a western neighbourhood of Chennai the capital of the India state of Tamil Nadu, under Avadi City Municipal Corporation Limits. It is located in the Chennai Metropolitan Area in Thiruvallur district, 3 km (1.9 mi) from Avadi and 3 km (1.9 mi) from Ambattur O.T Bus depot. The neighbourhood is served by Thirumullaivoyal railway station and Annanur Railway Station. The region was historically part of Thondaimandalam, a region in Chola Empire during 9th century CE.

The place was originally called Mullaivanam, a forest, after which the suburb is named. The history of the suburb revolves around the Masilmaninathar temple. The place is also one of the five revenue firkas under the Avadi Taluk. The place is a pilgrimage location and also houses several other religious and natural tourist destinations.

== Etymology ==
In ancient times, the forest surrounding Tirumullaivayil was ruled by two notorious tribesmen, Vaanan and Onan from the Kurumbar tribe. they are feudal lords of thirumullaivayil. King Thondaiman wanted to the area under his control . All his attempts went futile and finally he decided to defeat them in war. He set out for the war with all his infantry and cavalry with elephants and chariots. En route to the war, they waded through a dense growth of Mullai plants (Jasmine climbers). The foot of the elephant on which he was mounted was entangled in the dense foliage. The king and his men, in an attempt to free the elephant from this mess, went on to cut the wild twines with their swords and daggers. Suddenly they noticed blood gushing out from the leaves and found a 'lingam' bleeding. Shocked, the king was in great distress that he has committed a sin. Seeking mercy and forgiveness from Shiva, he prayed to him. Without any delay Shiva and Parvati appeared before the king lest he indulge in causing self-inflicted injury out of grief. Shiva asked the King to build a temple for him right there and promised that he would reside there as Masilamaniswara, Shiva who is as precious as a gem, but without stains ['maasu' - dirty or stain (caused by the profuse bleeding), 'ila' - without, 'mani' - gem]. It is believed that Shiva also promised to support him in destroying the Kurumbars by sending his holy steed, the Nandi bull. On his orders, the Nandi also gets ready to go and fight for the King. This is why the Nandi in this temple faces outwards, ready to leave for the battle on the orders of Shiva, whereas in all other Shiva temples, it faces inwards facing the sanctum.m.

== History ==
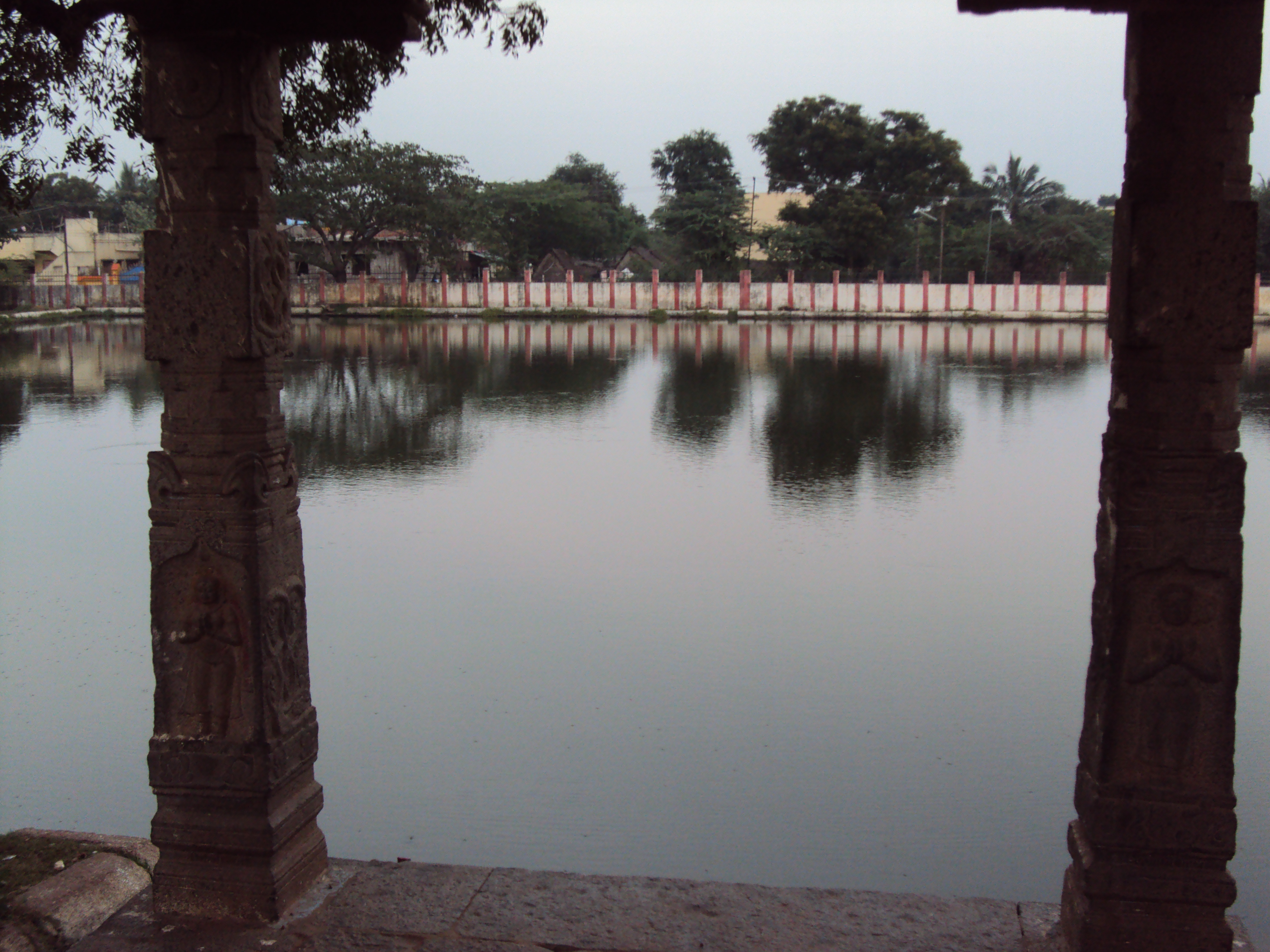
The temple tank

The history of the region is obtained from the inscriptions from the Masilamninathar temple. It has inscriptions from the period of Chola and Pandya, as per which, it was located on the banks of a tributary of river Palar. The temple has inscriptions from the period of Medieval Cholas and has received various architectural additions during their regime. An inscription from the period of Uttama Chola (970-85 CE) recorded as AR 669 of 1904 indicates that Sembiyan Mahadevi, the mother of Uttama bought 9,300 kulis of land for 80 kalanju of gold from the Mahasabha of Ambattur and made a gift to the temple. This is the northernmost of temples where Sembiyan Mahadevi donated for the temple construction. There are also inscriptions from the regime of Parthivendravarman, a feudatory of Uttama Chola, which mentions the reconquest of the regions lost to Rashtrakutas during the Battle of Takkolam fought during 949 CE. Another inscription recorded as 677 and 678 of 1904 from the period of Rajendra I (1012–1044 CE) records gifts to the temple. There are other inscriptions from subsequent Chola kings like Kulothunga III (1178–1218 CE) and Rajaraja III (1216–1256 CE). There are inscriptions from Pandya king Jatavarman Sundara Pandyan I and from kings of Vijayanagara Empire like Harihara Raya II (1377–1404 CE), Harihara Raya II (1377–1404 CE) and Mallikarjuna Raya (1446–1465 CE). The large Nandi Bull statue is believed to have been built to commemorate the victory of king Thondaiman over two demon brothers.

== Administration ==
Avadi is the state assembly constituency in Tamil Nadu, India, formed after constituency delimitation.^{[1]} The areas included are Poonamalle Taluk (partially), Pattabiram, Nemilicheri, Thirunindravur (TP), Tiruverkadu (TP) and Avadi (M). It is included in the Thiruvallur parliamentary constituency.

== Landmark ==
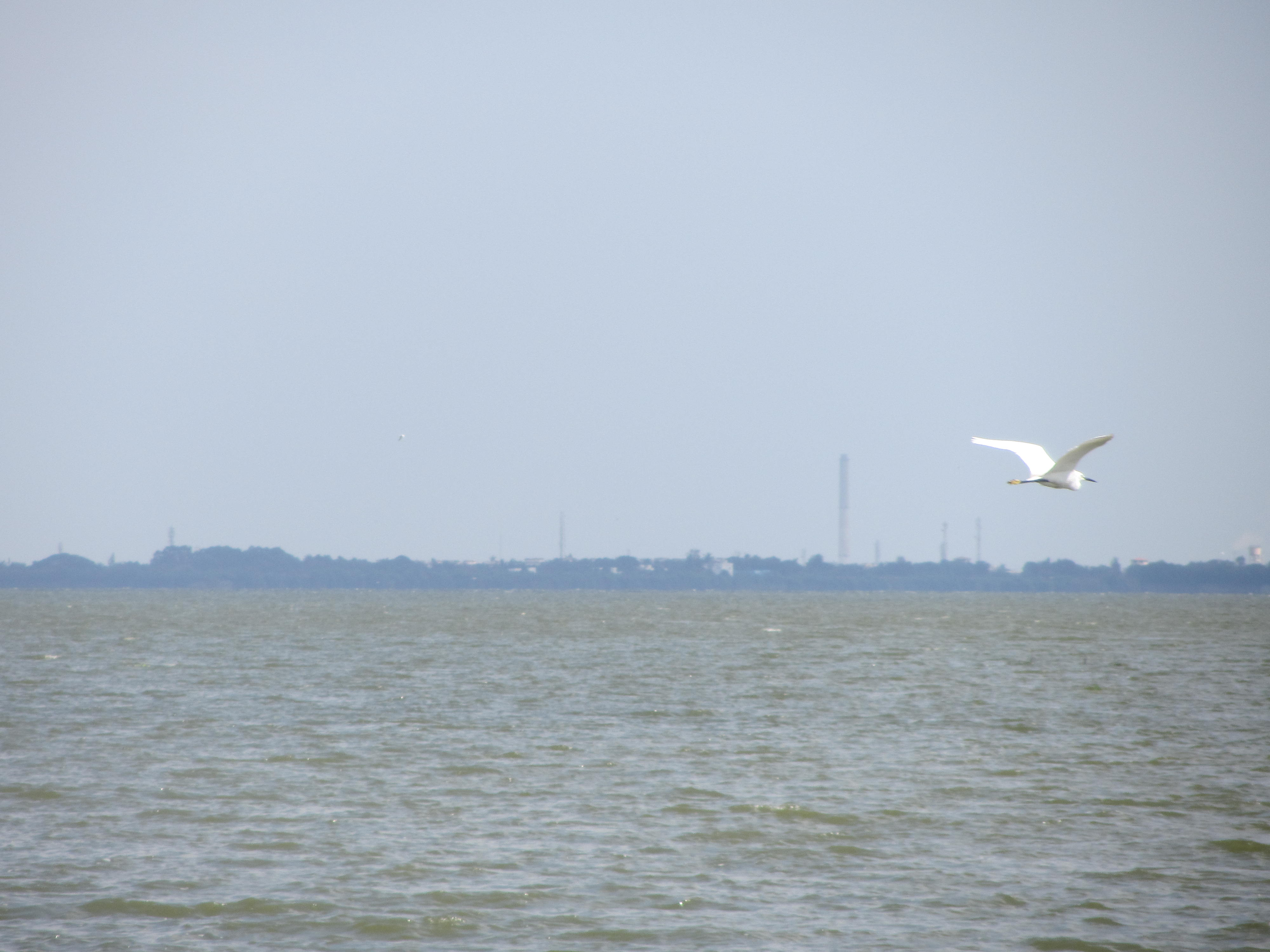
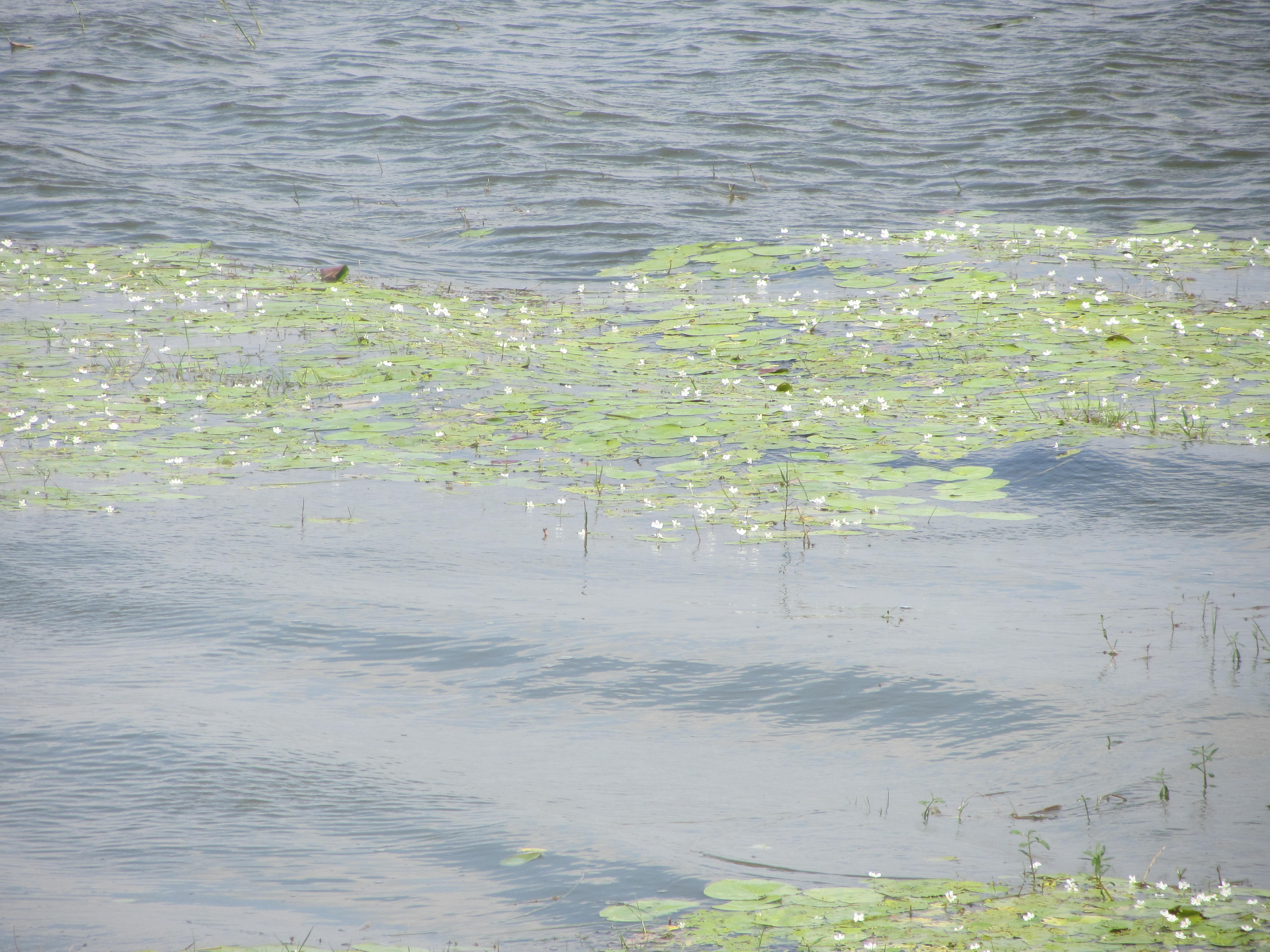
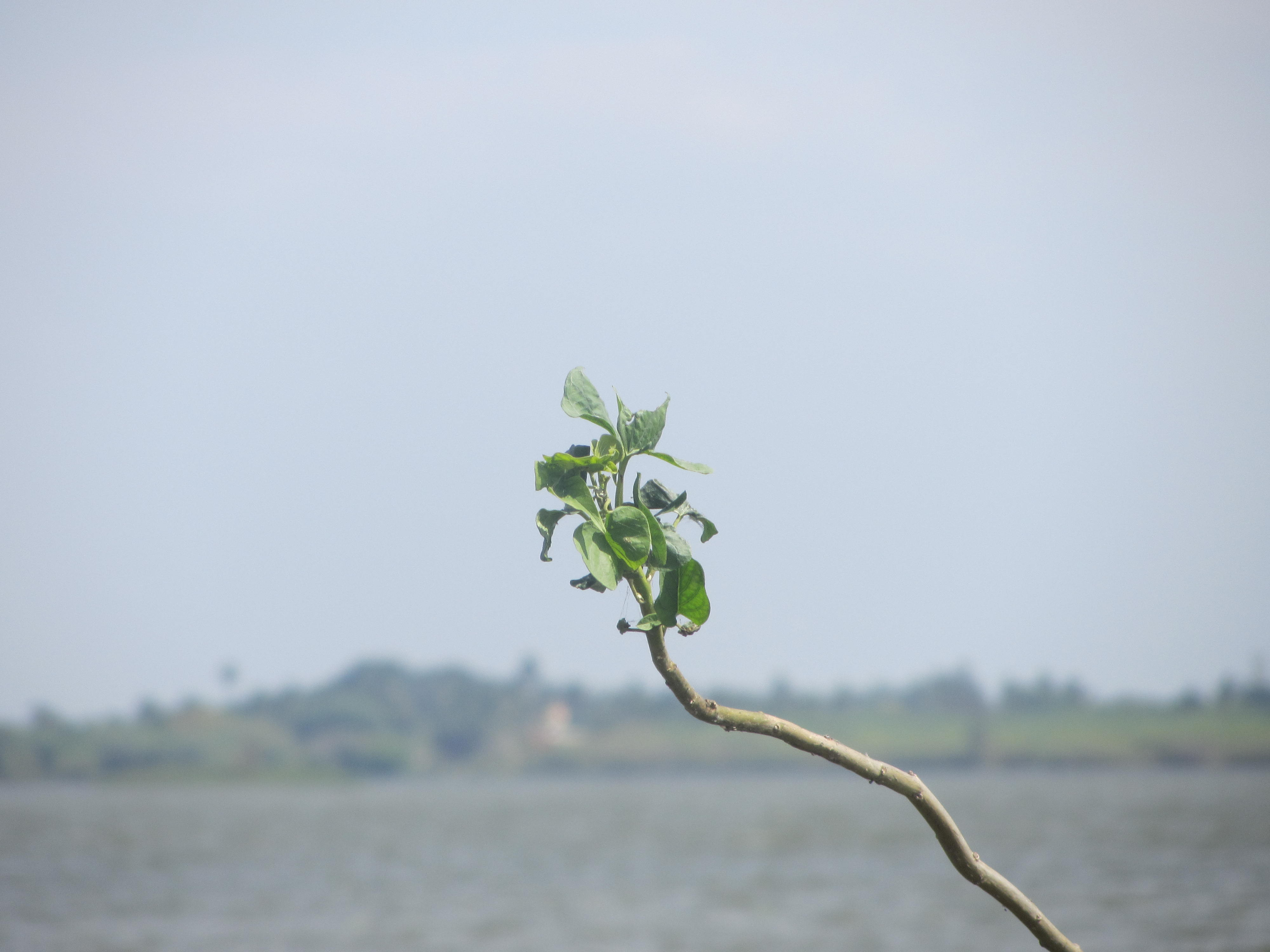

The Puzhal lake extends to the border of Thirumullaivoyal. Tamilnadu SIDCO Women Industrial Park (Estate) is located 5 km to the north of Thirumullaivoyal at Kattur.

== Transport ==
Thirumullaivoyal is connected by both railways and roadways to other parts of Chennai and the Chennai Metropolitan Area. Thirumullaivoyal sits on National Highway 205 (India) and is 25.0 km (15.5 mi) from Chennai International Airport and 20.0 km (12.4 mi) from Chennai Central. The Metropolitan Transport Corporation runs a mixed fleet of regular and deluxe buses through Thirumullaivoyal. All the buses operating in the 70 Route, which runs from Avadi to Tambaram through CMBT serves residents of Thirumullaivoyal. Some of the important routes include 70, 70A, B70, D70 EXTN, and 77.

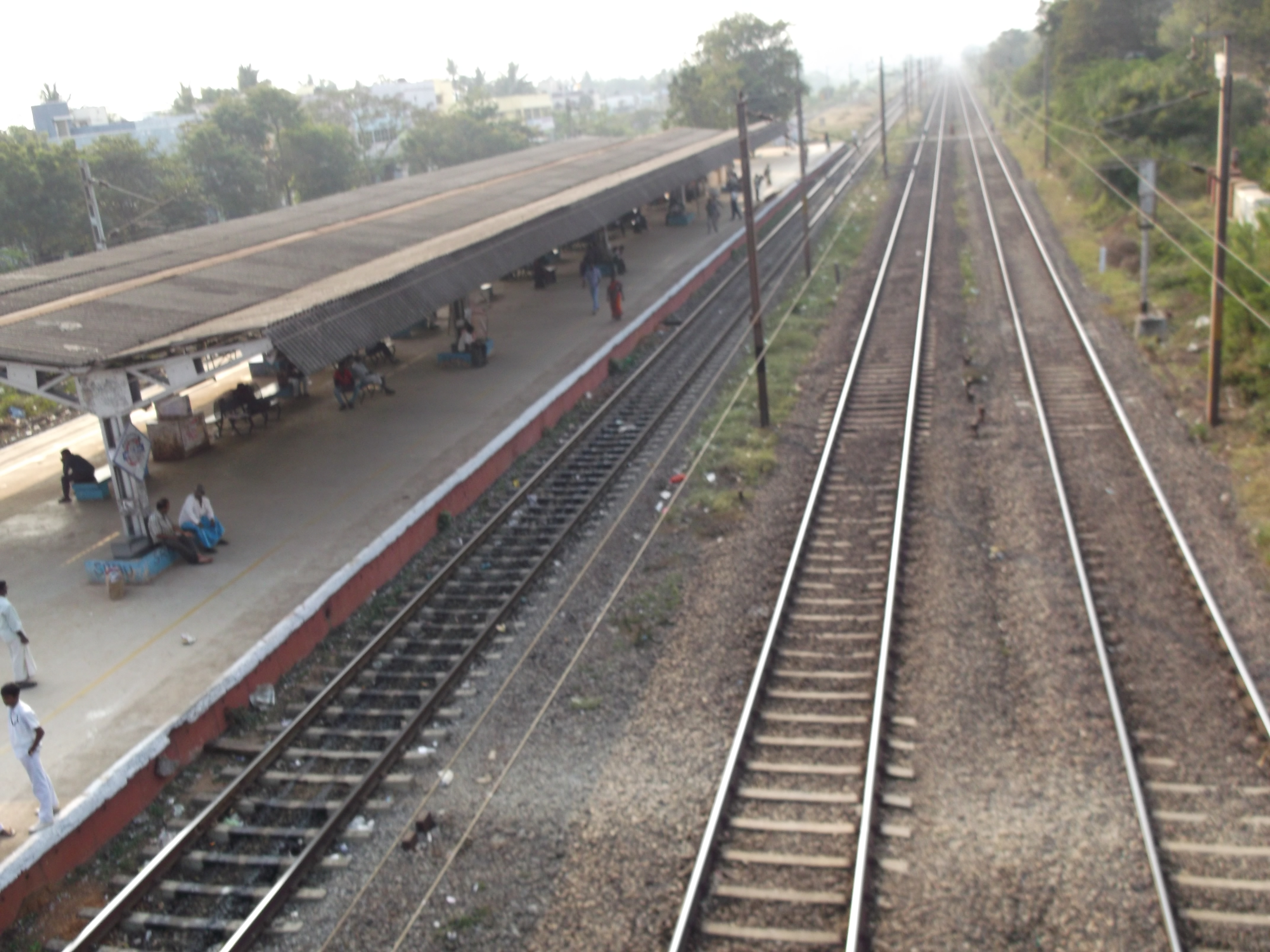
Image of the Thirumullaivoyal railway station

Chennai suburban railway, a commuter rail system operated by the Southern Railway, connects Thirumullaivoyal railway station. It connects the residents of Thirumullaivoyal to various parts of the city by providing access to Chennai's complex railway network. Thirumullaivoyal railway station sits on the rail network, which connects Chennai with Bangalore, Arakonam, West and southern parts of Tamil Nadu and also neighbouring states of Kerala and Karnataka. It is part of West Line in Chennai Railway Network. Senthil Nagar Bus Stand is available next to the Thirumullaivoyal Railway Station.

On 4 October 2013, the Tamil Nadu Highways department issued a GO extending the entire stretch of the road till Tirutani to 6 lanes at a cost of ₹ 1,680 million, by means of land acquisition from 12 villages. In the first phase, the road will be widened to 100 ft (4 lanes) with center median at a cost of ₹ 980 million.
