= Korattur =

- neighbourhood
- Korattur(Chennai) Korattur (Tamil Nadu) Korattur (India)
- Coordinates: 13.111497°N 80.184413°E
- Country: India
- State: Tamil Nadu
- District: Chennai District
- Metro: Chennai
- Zone: Ambattur Zone No 7
- Ward: Korattur (Ward 83,84)

Government
  - Body: Chennai Corporation

Languages
  - Official: Tamil
- Time zone: UTC+5:30 (IST)
- PIN: 600076, 600080, 600050
- Vehicle registration: TN 13(Ambattur)
- Lok Sabha constituency: Sriperumbudur, Chennai Central
- Vidhan Sabha constituency: Ambattur, Villivakkam
- Planning agency: CMDA
- Civic agency: Chennai Corporation
- Neighborhoods: Kolathur, Villivakkam, Ambattur, Anna Nagar, Pattaravakkam, Padi.

Korattur is a neighbourhood situated in the western part of Chennai. It is a part of the Ambattur Zone of Chennai Corporation and located along the Chennai-Bangalore/Mumbai railroad about 12 km from the Chennai Central. It is developed with Tamil Nadu Housing Board layouts similar to Anna Nagar. The southern section of Korattur located near Padi is often considered to be an integral part of Anna Nagar.

The town has developed from being a calm village in the early 20th century to an urban township of today due to the expansion of the Chennai city and the industrial development of west part of Chennai. The neighbourhood is served by Korattur railway station of the Chennai Suburban Railway. The main road (East and Central Avenue) have been laid as four-lane road with a median, such that each side has a two lanes with parking facility.

The Korattur area boasts the largest lake in the Chennai district, spanning approximately 990 acres named as Korattur Lake.

Korattur, nestled within the Ambattur industrial zone in Chennai, serves as a dynamic blend of industrial and residential landscapes. Adjacent to the Ambattur Industrial Estate, Korattur has evolved into an industrial hub hosting a wide array of manufacturing, textile, and engineering industries.

== Educational institutions ==
Korattur has government elementary school and also some CBSE and Matriculation schools, Private Institutes. Korattur also has a women's college.

- Bhaktavatsalam Memorial College
- Bhaktavatsalam Vidyashram
- Dr. Nalli Kuppuswami Vivekananda Vidyalaya Junior College
- Ebenezer Matriculation Higher Secondary School
- Rudrappasamy School
- Little Holy Angels Matriculation Higher Secondary School
- Good Shepherd Matriculation Higher Secondary School
- Christu Raja Matriculation School
- Ghurudev Education and Training Private Limited
- Dr. Ambedkar Institute of Productivity

== Hospitals ==
- Apple Plus Hospital
- Varamm Healthcare Pvt Ltd - Multispecialty Hospital Korattur
- KGJ Hospital
- Dr. R.Kamalakannan
- RPS Hospitals
- Sri Senthil Nursing Home

== Transport ==
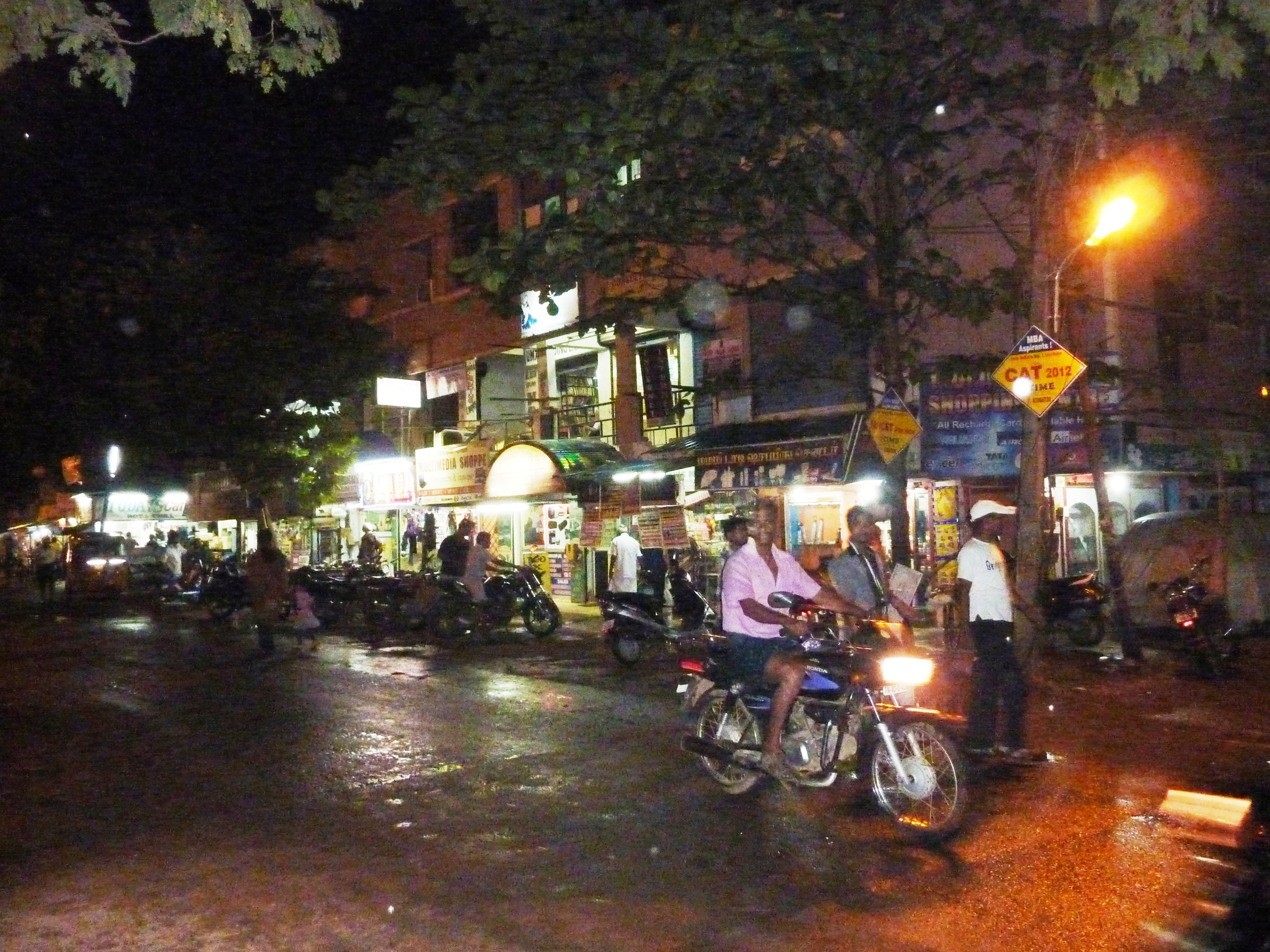
Busy shops on 31st street on a rainy day

Though located around 10–13 km away from many central places in the city, Korattur is well-linked by public transport. Local trains (EMU) starting from Chennai Central /Chennai Beach railway station /Velachery Railway station to Avadi / Tiruvallur / Arakkonam stop at Korattur. Metropolitan Transport Corporation (Chennai) bus services are 35 from Parry's Corner, 70LCT from Guindy, 47DCT from T. Nagar, 41D from Mandaveli to Ambattur via Korattur Central Avenue, S75 from Ambattur to Lucas TVS via Korattur Bus Terminus, S42 from Maduravoyal, S70K from korattur Water Canal road to Thirumangalam Metro Station.

== Places of worship ==
There are a few Hindu temples, the oldest being Jambookeshwar Temple old Earikarai Sri Siyathamman Temple. A mosque and two churches: Holy Trinity Church and Infant Jesus. The other temples are Lakshminarayanan Perumal for Vishnu (adjacent to Jambookeshwarar temple), Vardaraja perumal temple, Sai Baba temple in East Avenue (Main Road), Nagavalli Amman temple (38th main street), Vijayashakthi Vinayakar Temple in north Srinivasapuram, Pillayar Koil (next to police station), Anjaneyar temple (near the bus stand), Sri Vilvanathar temple (Lakshmana Mudali 2nd st), Sri Throwpathy Amman Kovil, Sri Muthumari Amman Temple where one can also find the shrine of Shri Sridi Sai Baba within the temple premises and Yoga Anjaneyar temple with Munishwaran shrine in the same premises along the banks of Korattur Eri. The population is predominantly Hindu, with many Brahmins, but a number of Muslims and Christians also live there.

== Recreational centres ==
Theatres include Green Cinemas (multiplex) near Britannia bus stop. The Korattur Lake present north of the railway line, is an important sightseeing place in this town. Apart from being a water reservoir that is useful to people here, it also acts as a buffer during rains. This lake is also home to a wide variety of animals. Over 50 species of birds can be seen in the wild in this lake, particularly in winter months. This lake is a major attraction to wildlife and bird enthusiasts in north Chennai. Despite major habitat loss in the present decade, the lake still houses a good amount of animal and plant life.

== See also ==
Transport in Chennai
