= Pattaravakkam railway station =

Railway station in Chennai, India

Pattaravakkam
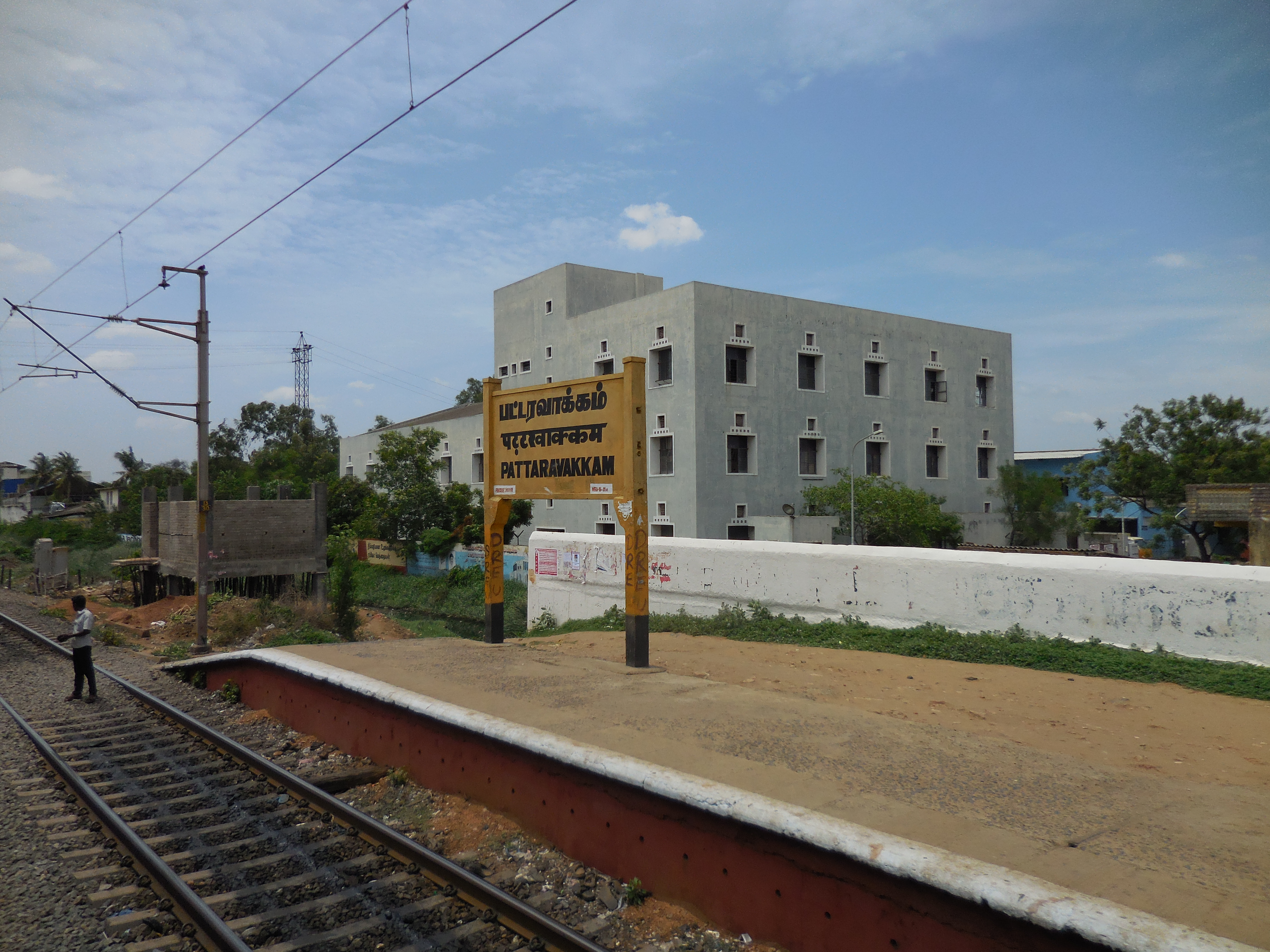
- Eastern end of Pattaravakkam railway station

General information
- Location: Pattaravakkam, Chennai, Tamil Nadu, India
- Coordinates: 13°06′53″N 80°09′58″E
- System: Indian Railways and Chennai Suburban Railway station
- Owner: Ministry of Railways, Indian Railways
- Lines: West, West North and West South lines of Chennai Suburban Railway
- Platforms: 2
- Tracks: 4

Construction
- Structure type: Standard on-ground station
- Parking: Available

Other information
- Station code: PVM
- Fare zone: Southern Railways

History
- Electrified: 29 November 1979
- Former names: South Indian Railway

Services
Preceding station	Chennai Suburban	Following station
Ambattur towards Arakkonam Junction	West Line	Korattur towards Chennai Central MMC
Route map
Chennai Central MMC — Jolarpet
Location

Pattaravakkam railway station is one of the railway stations of the Chennai Central–Arakkonam section of the Chennai Suburban Railway Network. Located about 14 km from Chennai Central railway station, the station serves the neighbourhoods of Pattaravakkam and Ambattur Industrial Estate and other smaller suburbs such as Karukku, Kallikuppam, and Menambedu. It has an elevation of 16.01 m above sea level. It is a suburb of Chennai City.

== History ==
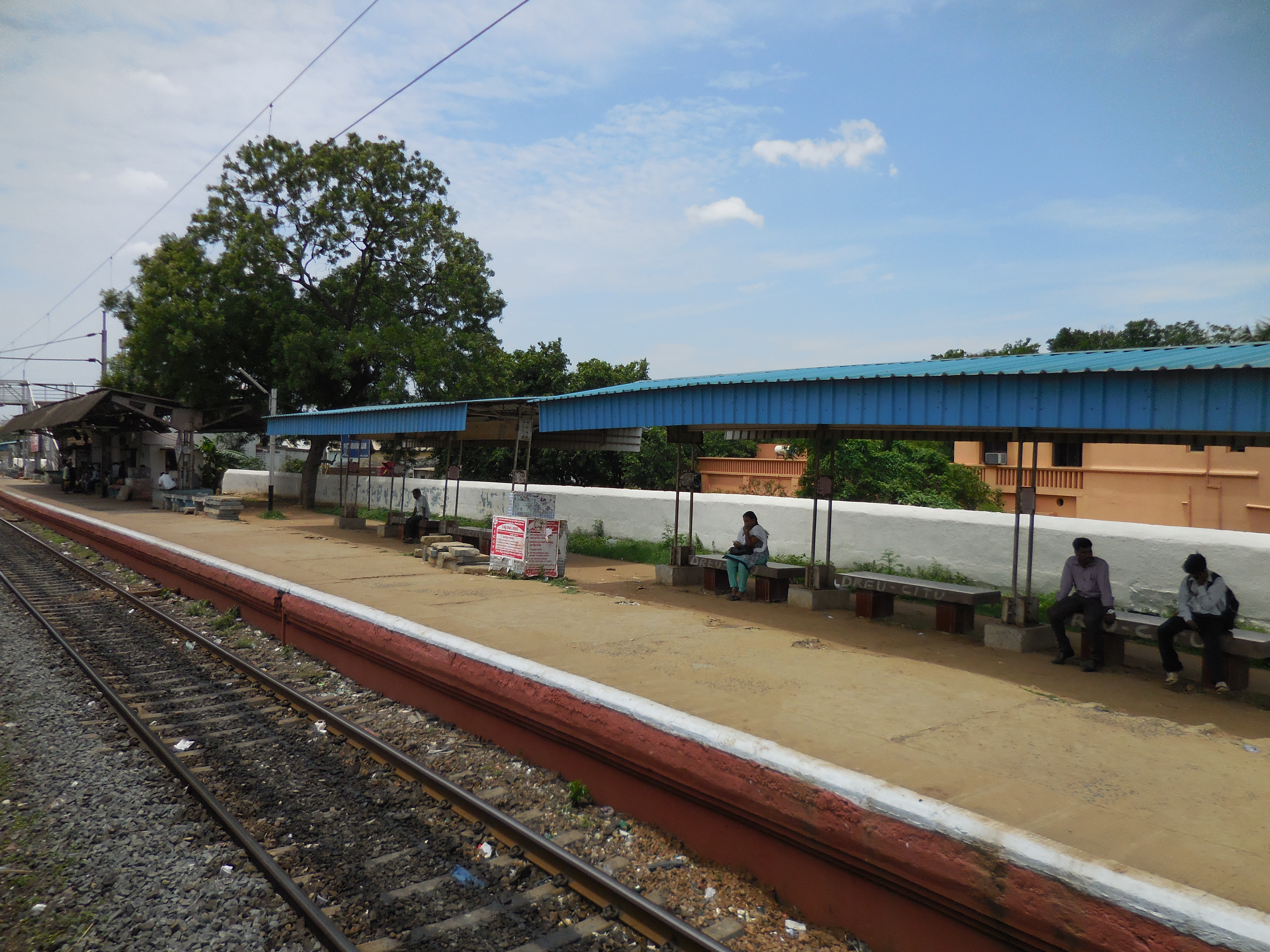
Platform 1 at Pattaravakkam railway station

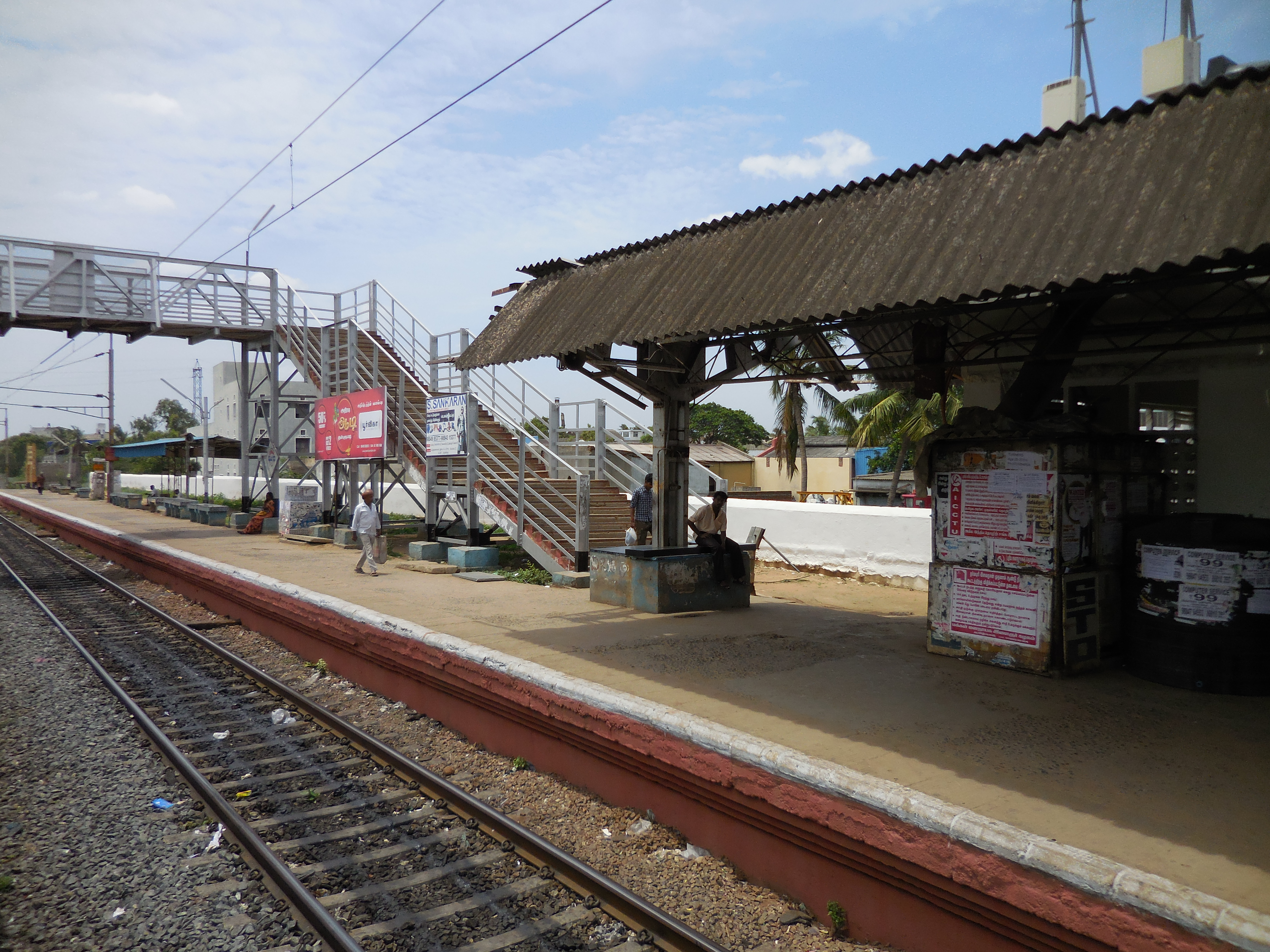
A view of the footbridge at the station

The first lines in the station were electrified on 29 November 1979, with the electrification of the Chennai Central–Tiruvallur section. Additional lines at the station were electrified on 2 October 1986, with the electrification of the Villivakkam–Avadi section.

== Layout ==
The station has four tracks, two exclusively for suburban trains. The suburban tracks are served by a side platform and an island platform. The station's entrance and the ticket counter are located on the side platform. The platforms are connected by means of a footbridge for pedestrians.

=== Station layout ===
G	North Entrance Street level	Exit/Entrance, FOB & ticket counter
P	Track 4	Towards → MGR Chennai Central
P	Track 3	Towards ← Arakkonam Junction / Jolarpettai Junction
P	FOB, Island platform | P2 Doors will open on the left | P3 & P4 – Express Lines
P	Platform 2	Towards → Chennai Central MMC next station is Korattur
P	Platform 1	Towards ← Arakkonam Junction next station is Ambattur
P	FOB, Side platform | P1 Doors will open on the left
G	South Entrance Street level	Exit/Entrance & ticket counter

== Facilities ==
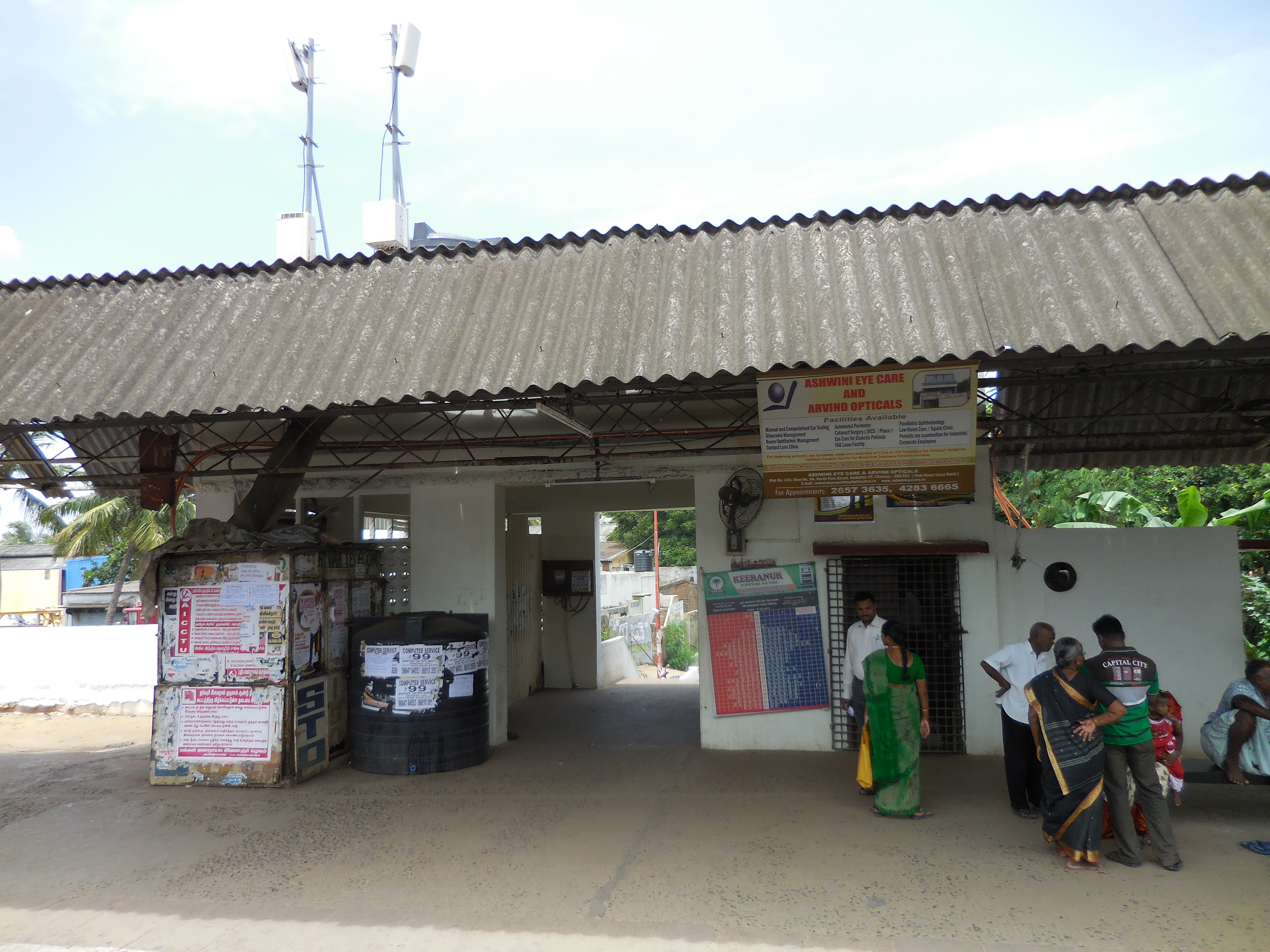
Ticket counter and the main entrance/exit at the station

The station is devoid of several basic amenities for several years now. An odd 48 sq ft room is the sole staff building in the station, which houses the only ticket counter of the station. There is no room for the station master or any other security staff in the station.

== Traffic ==
The station handles at least 5,000 to 6,000 commuters a day, which accounts for a financial turnout of ₹ 50,000 every day.

== Developments ==
A 1.15 km long, two-laned road overbridge with 21 spans serves the level crossing no. 5 near the station. In 2009, the government sanctioned the ₹ 350-million project, which was jointly built by the State Highways and the Southern Railway, but the construction work began in June 2011. It was opened to traffic in June 2014. It connects Aavin Dairy Road in Ambattur with Karukku Main Road.

== See also ==
- Chennai Suburban Railway
- Railway stations in Chennai
