= Korattur Aeri =

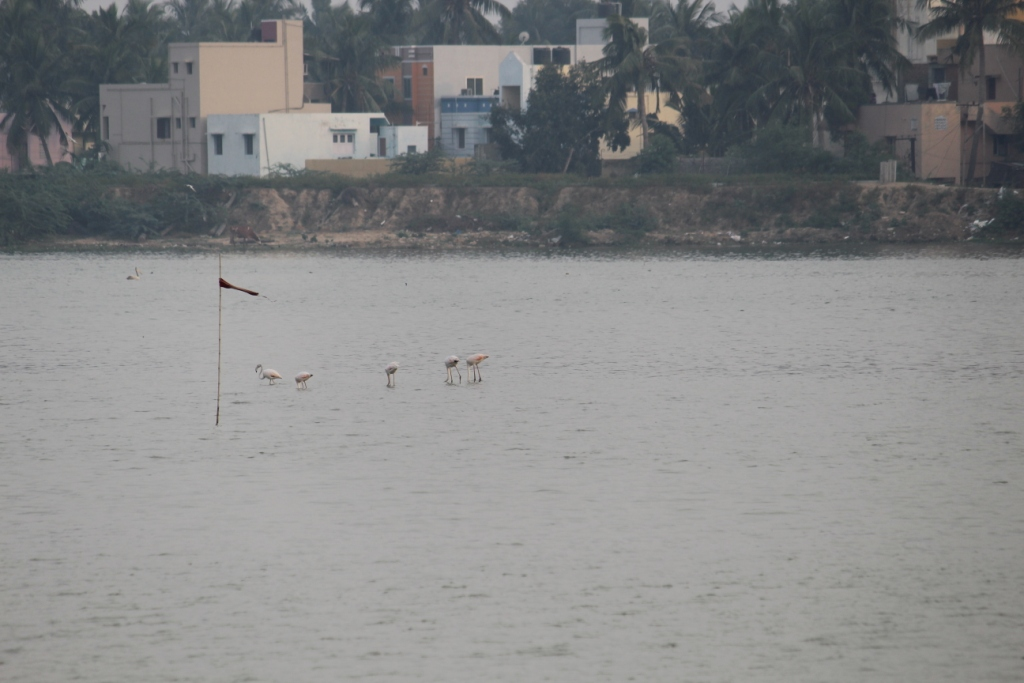
- Korattur Lake

- Location within Chennai
- Location: Korattur, Chennai, India
- Coordinates: 13.12330°N 80.18047°E
- Type: Lake
- Basin countries: India
- Surface area: 990 acres (400 ha) (water spread area: 700 acres (280 ha))
- Islands: Vembu Pasumai Thittu
- Settlements: Chennai

Korattur Aeri, or Korattur Lake, also known as Vembu Pasumai Thittu, is a lake spread over 990 acres in Korattur, Chennai, India. It is located to the north of the Chennai–Arakkonam railway line. It is one of the largest lakes in the western part of the city.

Korattur Aeri is one of a chain of three water bodies, including the Ambattur Aeri and the Madhavaram Aeri, where surplus water from one is transported to another. The water from the lake had been supplied to Chennai residents for a brief period when there was a shortage in the late 1970s. However, over the years, the lake has been contaminated with sewage and industrial effluents from surrounding areas such as Pattaravakkam, Athipet and Ambattur.

== Developments ==
In 2013, the Water Resources Department decided to rejuvenate and beautify the lakes in Ambattur, Madhavaram and Korattur with parks and walkways. The total project costs ₹ 600 million. In 2018, the corporation identified and removed about 550 encroachments along the bank of the lake and the bund will be strengthened to a distance of 3 kilometers.

== Flora and fauna ==
This Lake is an important wildlife refuge in northern and western parts of Chennai, together with the much larger Puzhal Lake and the like-sized Madhavaram Lake and Ambattur Lake. According to the Care Earth Trust, a city-based biodiversity research organisation, nearly 40 bird species are present in these lakes, including common tailorbird, the purple-rumped sunbird, and the migratory Asian openbill stork.

A good part of greenery and natural vegetation was present in this lake, even till the last decade. Much natural vegetation once existed in the lake and its bund. Palmyrah, date palm, umbrella thorn trees dot the bund. Inside the lake, water hyacinth is to be seen. This apart, many aquatic vegetation, water lily and wetland rushes are present in the water body.

The lake has a multitude of birds, and is a major attraction for wildlife enthusiasts.

== See also ==
- Water management in Chennai
