= Korattur railway station =

Railway station in Chennai, India

Korattur
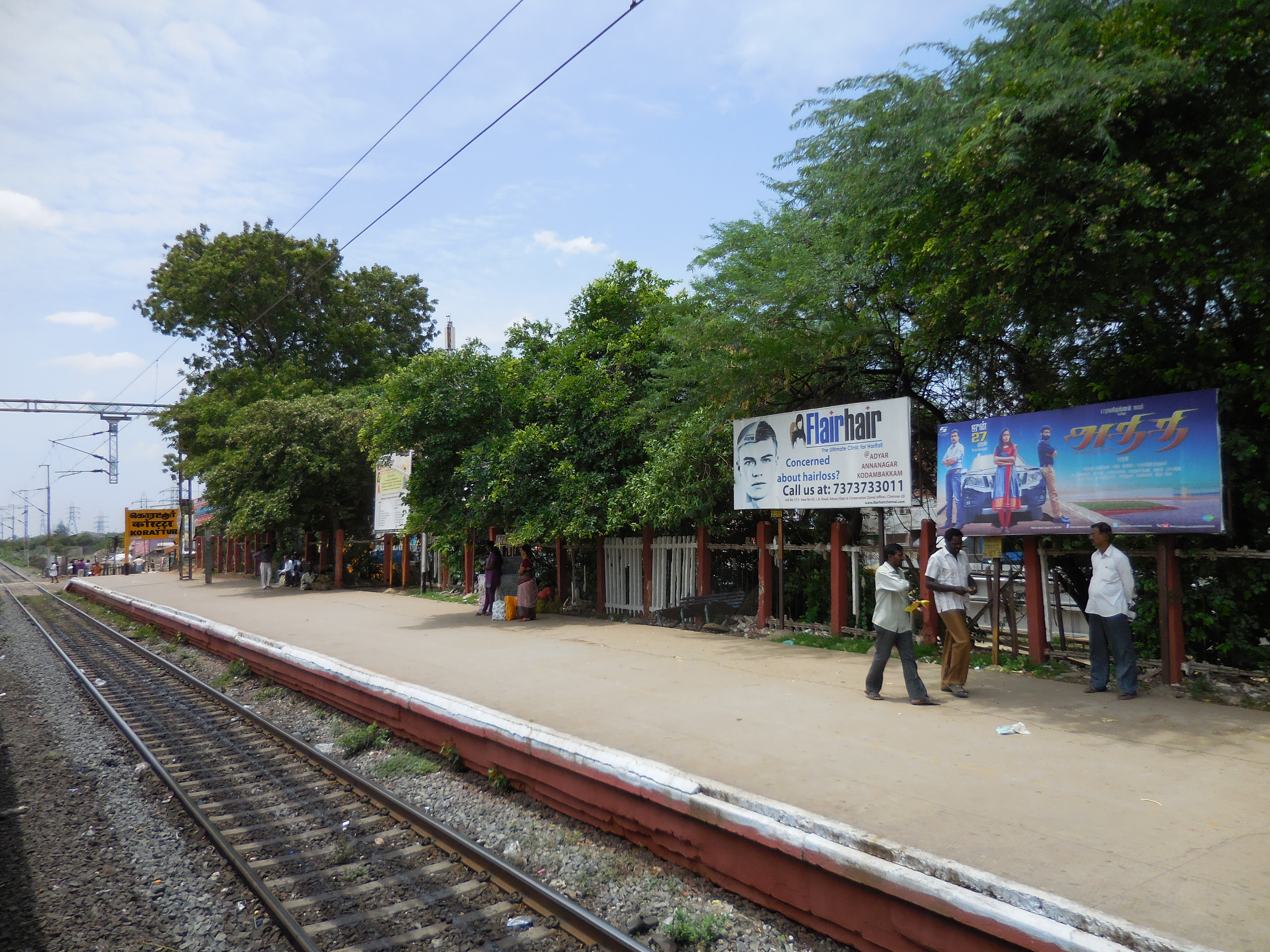
- Korattur railway station

General information
- Location: Korattur, Chennai, Tamil Nadu, India
- Coordinates: 13°6′48″N 80°11′3″E
- System: Indian Railways and Chennai Suburban Railway station
- Owner: Ministry of Railways, Indian Railways
- Lines: West, North West and West South lines of Chennai Suburban Railway.
- Platforms: 2
- Tracks: 4

Construction
- Structure type: Standard on-ground station
- Parking: Available

Other information
- Station code: KOTR
- Fare zone: Southern Railways

History
- Electrified: 29 November 1979
- Former names: South Indian Railway

Passengers
- 2018: 43,000

Services
Preceding station	Chennai Suburban	Following station
Pattaravakkam towards Arakkonam Junction	West Line	Villivakkam towards Chennai Central MMC
Route map
Chennai Central MMC — Jolarpet
Location

Korattur railway station is a railway station on the Chennai Central–Arakkonam section of the Chennai Suburban Railway Network. Located 12 km from the main Chennai Central railway station, the station serves the neighbourhoods of Korattur, Kolathur and Padi. It has an elevation of 12.85 m above sea level. It is situated in the western part of Chennai.

== History ==
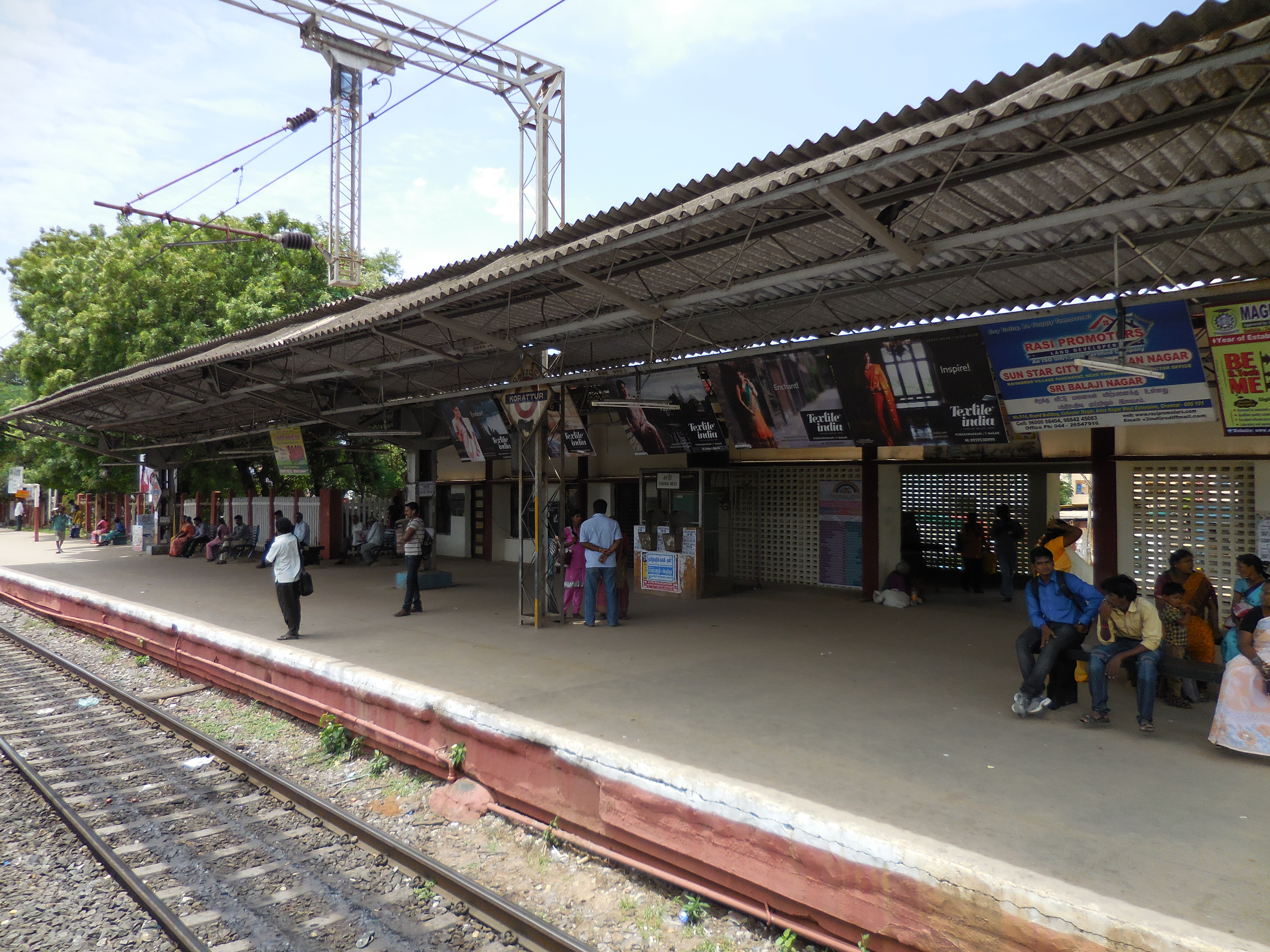
Exit and ticket counter at the station

The first lines in the station were electrified on 29 November 1979, with the electrification of the Chennai Central–Tiruvallur section. Additional lines at the station were electrified on 2 October 1986, with the electrification of the Villivakkam–Avadi section.

== Layout ==
The station has four tracks, two exclusively for suburban trains. The suburban tracks are served by a side platform and an island platform. The station's entrance and the ticket counter are located on the side platform. The platforms are connected by means of a footbridge for pedestrians.

=== Station layout ===
G	North Entrance Street level	Exit/Entrance & ticket counter
P	Track 4	Towards → MGR Chennai Central
P	Track 3	Towards ← Arakkonam Junction / Jolarpettai Junction
P	FOB, Island platform | P2 Doors will open on the right | P3 & P4 – Express Lines
P	Platform 2	Towards → Chennai Central MMC next station is Villivakkam
P	Platform 1	Towards ← Arakkonam Junction next station is Pattaravakkam
P	FOB, Side platform | P1 Doors will open on the left
G	South Entrance Street level	Exit/Entrance & ticket counter

== Traffic ==
On an average, suburban trains on the western rail route between Chennai Central and Arakkonam make about 260 trips through the station. As of 2018, more than 43,000 passengers board trains at the Korattur railway station every day. The Korattur station chiefly serves college students and industrial workers from the Ambattur Industrial Estate.

== Developments ==
A subway to replace level crossing no. 4 at the railway station has been planned at a cost of ₹ 112.5 million, for which tenders have been finalised.

== See also ==
- Chennai Suburban Railway
- Railway stations in Chennai
