= Annanur =

- Neighbourhood
- Location within Chennai
- Coordinates: 13°6′6″N 80°7′42″E
- Country: India
- State: Tamil Nadu
- District: Chennai
- Metro: Chennai

Languages
  - Official: Tamil
- Time zone: UTC+5:30 (IST)
- PIN: 600062
- Telephone code: 044
- Vehicle registration: TN-13 (RTO, Ambattur)
- Civic agency: Chennai Avadi Corporation Zone
- Climate: Tropical (Köppen)

Annanur is a western neighbourhood of Chennai, India. It is located near Ambattur and lies in Tiruvallur District. It comes under the Avadi Municipal Corporation. It is located about 20 km from the city centre.

== Geography ==
Thirumullaivoyal revenue is surrounded by Red Hills Lake, Oragadam, Ambattur, Avadi, Athipet and Ayanambakkam. Within Thirumullaivoyal, there are large area of lakes such as Thirumullaivoyal lake, Arapath Lake, Ambattur Lake, and the like. Airports Authority of India, Southern Railways, temples, and the Tamil Nadu Police own many green-belt areas.

== Transportation ==
=== Rail ===
Annanur has a railway station on the Chennai suburban railway, for the locals to commute.

Annanur Railway Station falls within Avadi Taluk, Tiruvallur District, within municipal limits of Avadi Municipality. Bounded north by Redhills Lake, South By Parithipattu (Avadi), Ayappakkam, Athipet, East by Ambattur Zone West by Parithipattu (Avadi), Thirumullaivoyal has two railway stations (halt), namely, Thirumullaivoyal and Annanur within one kilometer distance.

=== Road ===
Chennai Tirupati National High Way (NH 205) is the main road connectivity to Annanur Railway Station in Thirumulaivoyal, 60 Feet Railway Station Road (Railway Road) is the connecting road from NH 205 to Annanur Railway Station, Avadi Car Shed Complex. Presently NH 205 is under road widening. This project is under taken by Transstroy India.

There is a proposal by Tamil Nadu Highways Department, under Rural Road Scheme, having its office in Chengalpattu, to construct a road over bridge across at Railway Level Crossing No. 7 at 17/34-18/2 in between Ambattur and Avadi (near Annanur Railway Station). A detailed project report has been prepared by the Alps Incorporation Chennai. which will connect to Chennai Bypass, Outer Ring Road, NH. 4.

Bus no -S97 run between Avadi - Ambattur O. T.

== Education ==
St. Peter's Engineering College is located near the Annanur railway station. There are two corporation schools in this area.

== Recreation ==
=== Camp Tonakela Association ===
Camp Tonakela Association is located in the south end of Thirumulaivoyal, north of Ayapakkam.

== Development ==
The recent developments are the 60 feet Railway road which stretches from Railway station to Murugappa Polytechnic and connects to NH-205. 40 feet Railway road is still under the screening. The new Annanur is majorly divided into Sivasakthi nagar subdivided into various sectors (A-F) and Sri Sakthi Nagar is subdivided into old Tamil literature street names.

Major division of Annanur has Jothi Nagar other side of Annanur is subdivided into Flowers and river names as street names. The Annanur has a railway quarters which counts to a considerable amount of population to this area. Also many students from various colleges stay here due to its proximity to both rail and road.
