= Annanur railway station =

Railway station in Chennai, India

Annanur
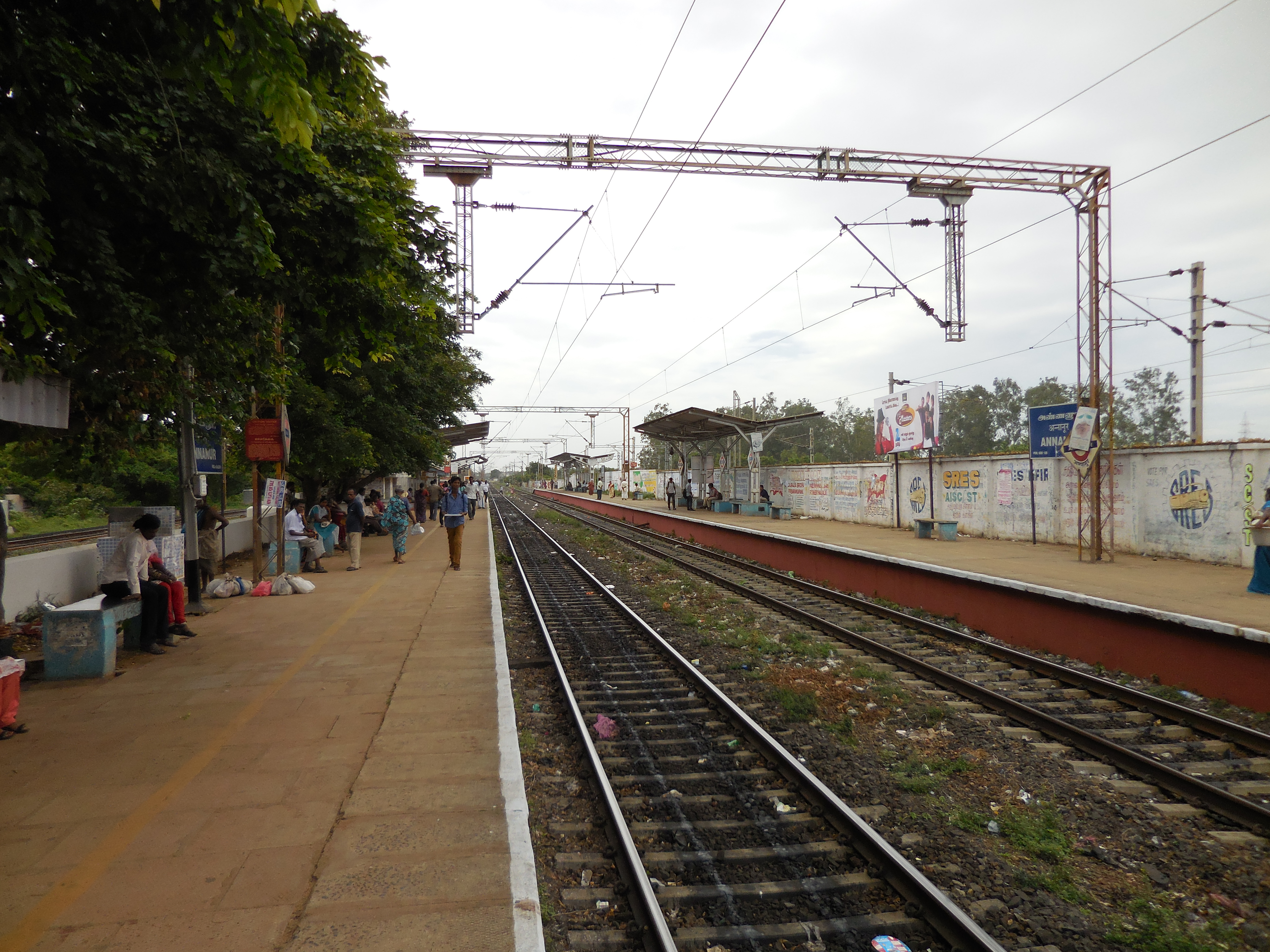
- Annanur railway station

General information
- Location: Annanur, Chennai, Tamil Nadu, India
- Coordinates: 13°6′59″N 80°7′38″E
- System: Indian Railways and Chennai Suburban Railway station
- Owner: Ministry of Railways, Indian Railways
- Lines: West, West North and West South lines of Chennai Suburban Railway
- Platforms: 2
- Tracks: 4

Construction
- Structure type: Standard on-ground station
- Parking: Available

Other information
- Station code: ANNR
- Fare zone: Southern Railways

History
- Electrified: 29 November 1979
- Former names: South Indian Railway

Passengers
- 2016: 20,000/day

Services
Preceding station	Chennai Suburban	Following station
Avadi towards Arakkonam Junction	West Line	Thirumullaivoyal towards Chennai Central MMC
Route map
Chennai Central MMC — Jolarpet
Location

Annanur railway station is one of the railway stations of the Chennai Central–Arakkonam section of the Chennai Suburban Railway Network. Located about 18 km from Chennai Central railway station, the station serves the neighbourhood of Annanur, which is pronounced as 'Annanoor', a suburb of Chennai located west of the city centre. It has an elevation of 24.28 m above sea level. The station also has an EMU car shed complex located on the southern side.

== History ==
The first lines in the station were electrified on 29 November 1979, with the electrification of the Chennai Central–Tiruvallur section. Additional lines at the station were electrified on 2 October 1986, with the electrification of the Villivakkam–Avadi section.

== Layout ==
The station has four tracks and two platforms—a side platform and an island platform. The island platform houses the ticket counter. Unlike most other suburban stations on the network, the station lack several basic passenger amenities such as macadamised road leading to the neighbourhoods. A new footover bridge (FOB) has been constructed and now in use since May 2023. But the passengers are put to hardship as all the direct approaches to the platform has been blocked due to the running of high speed train on this route.Old people and people with luggage find it very difficult.

=== Station layout ===
G	North Entrance Street level	Exit/Entrance, FOB & ticket counter
P	Track 4	Towards → MGR Chennai Central
P	Track 3	Towards ← Arakkonam Junction / Jolarpettai Junction
P	FOB, Island platform | P2 Doors will open on the left | T3 & T4 – Express Lines
P	Platform 2	Towards → Chennai Central MMC next station is Thirumullaivoyal
P	Platform 1	Towards ← Arakkonam Junction next station is Avadi
P	FOB, Side platform | P1 Doors will open on the left
G	South Entrance Street level	Exit/Entrance & ticket counter

== Traffic ==
As of 2016, the railway station serves around 20,000 passengers every day.

== Road overbridge ==
In 2012, the state government approved the construction of a 200 m-long (660 ft) two-lane road overbridge meant for two-wheelers and cars at a cost of ₹ 240 million.

== See also ==
- Chennai Suburban Railway
- Railway stations in Chennai
