= Thirumullaivoyal railway station =

Railway station in Chennai, India

Thirumullaivoyal
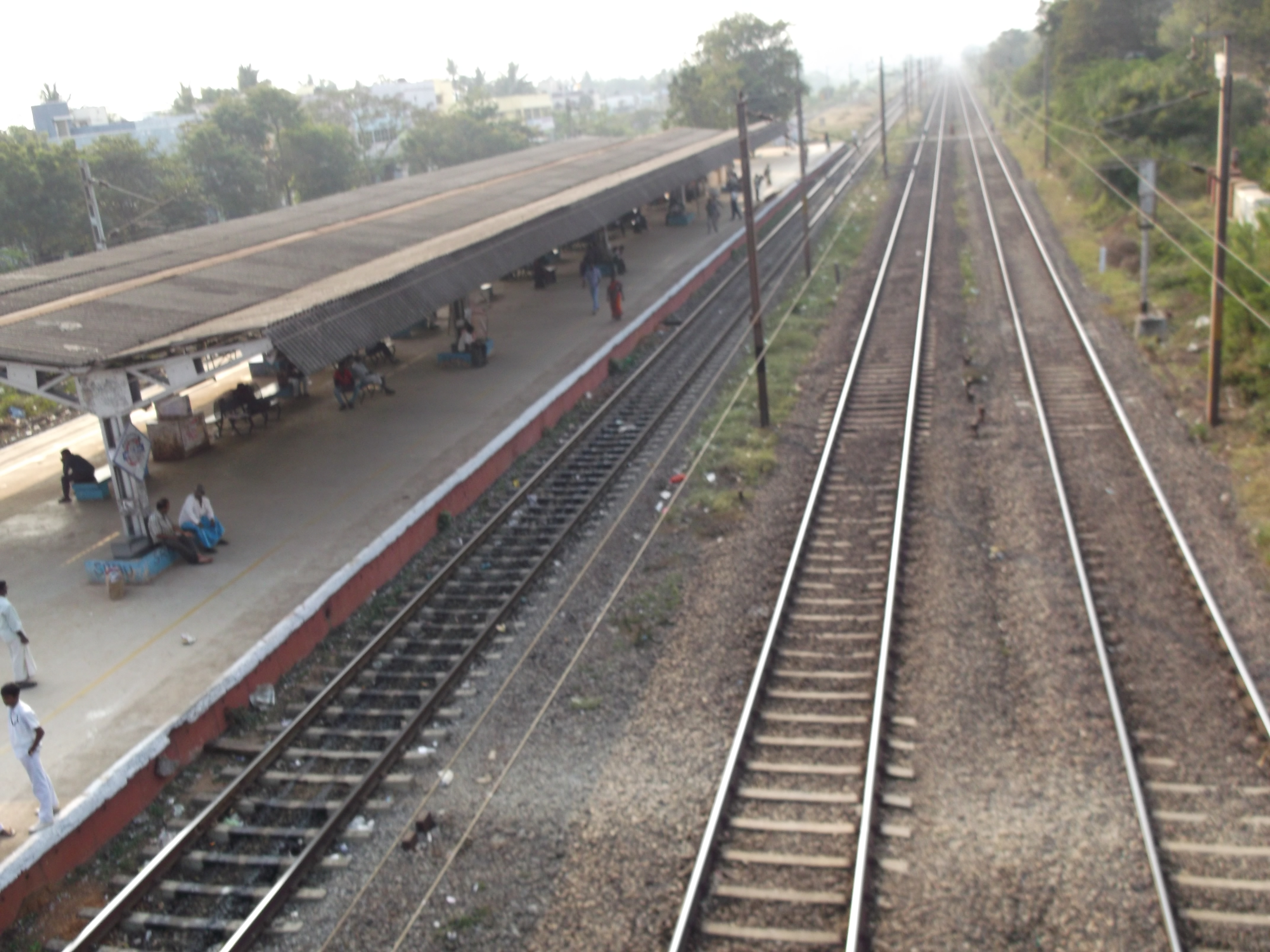
- Thirumullaivoyal railway station

General information
- Location: Thirumullaivoyal, Chennai, Tamil Nadu, India
- System: Indian Railways and Chennai Suburban Railway station
- Owner: Ministry of Railways, Indian Railways
- Lines: West, West North and West South lines of Chennai Suburban Railway
- Platforms: 2 (Island platform)
- Tracks: 4

Construction
- Structure type: Standard on-ground station
- Parking: Available

Other information
- Status: Active
- Station code: TMVL
- Fare zone: Southern Railways

History
- Electrified: 29 November 1979
- Former names: South Indian Railway

Services
Preceding station	Chennai Suburban	Following station
Annanur towards Arakkonam Junction	West Line	Ambattur towards Chennai Central MMC
Route map
Chennai Central MMC — Jolarpet
Location

Thirumullaivoyal railway station is one of the railway stations on the Chennai Central–Arakkonam section of the Chennai Suburban Railway Network. It serves the neighbourhoods of moondru nagar, Jayalakshmi Nagar, Senthil Nagar and Thirumullaivoyal and a suburb of Chennai located 17 km west of the city centre. It is situated at Senthil Nagar near Ambattur and has an elevation of 21.73 m above sea level.

== History ==
The first lines in the station were electrified on 29 November 1979, with the electrification of the Chennai Central–Tiruvallur section. Additional lines at the station were electrified on 2 October 1986, with the electrification of the Villivakkam–Avadi section.

== Layout ==
The station is the newest one in the Chennai Central-Arakkonam section. There are four tracks—two serving exclusively for the suburban trains. The suburban tracks are served by an island platform, on which the station building is situated. A footbridge connects the platform with the neighbourhood.

=== Station layout ===
G	North Entrance Street level	Exit/Entrance & FOB
P	Track 4	Towards → MGR Chennai Central
P	Track 3	Towards ← Arakkonam Junction / Jolarpettai Junction
P	Platform 2	Towards → Chennai Central MMC next station is Ambattur
P	FOB, Island platform | P1 & P2 Doors will open on the right | T3 & T4 – Express Lines
P	Platform 1	Towards ← Arakkonam Junction next station is Annanur
G	South Entrance Street level	Exit/Entrance, FOB & ticket counter

== Gallery ==
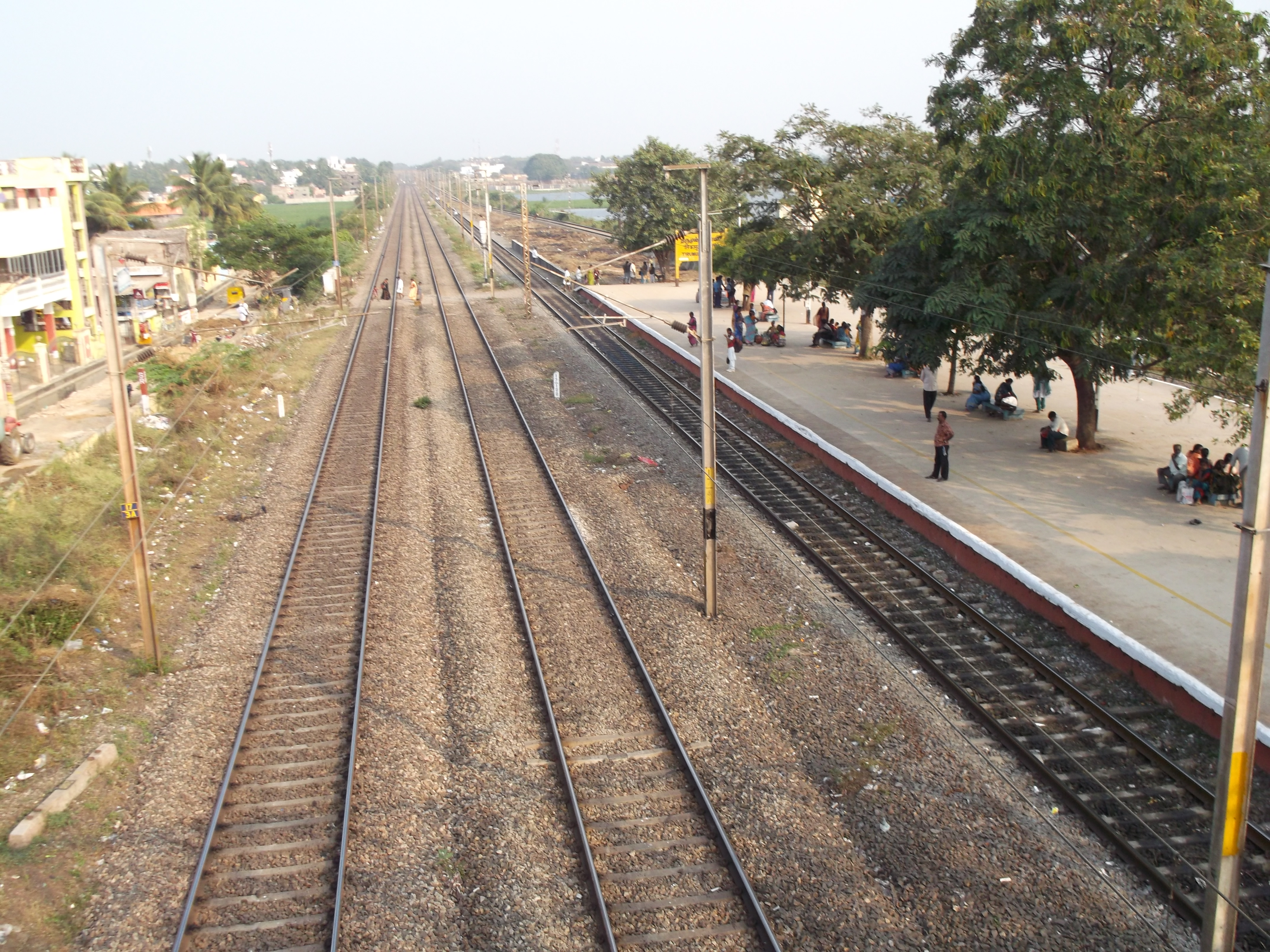
Thirumullaivoyal station towards the eastern side

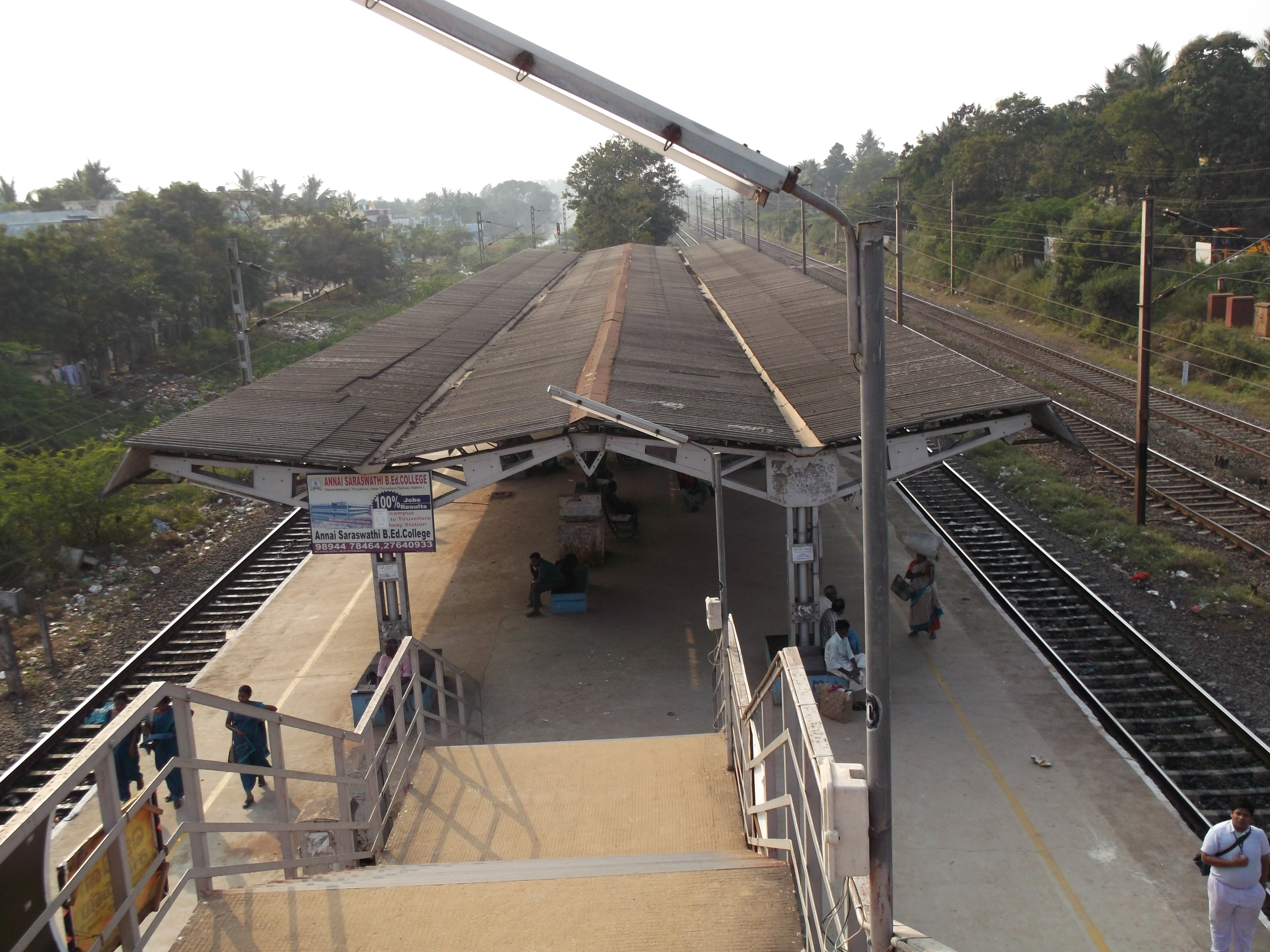
Thirumullaivoyal station towards the western side

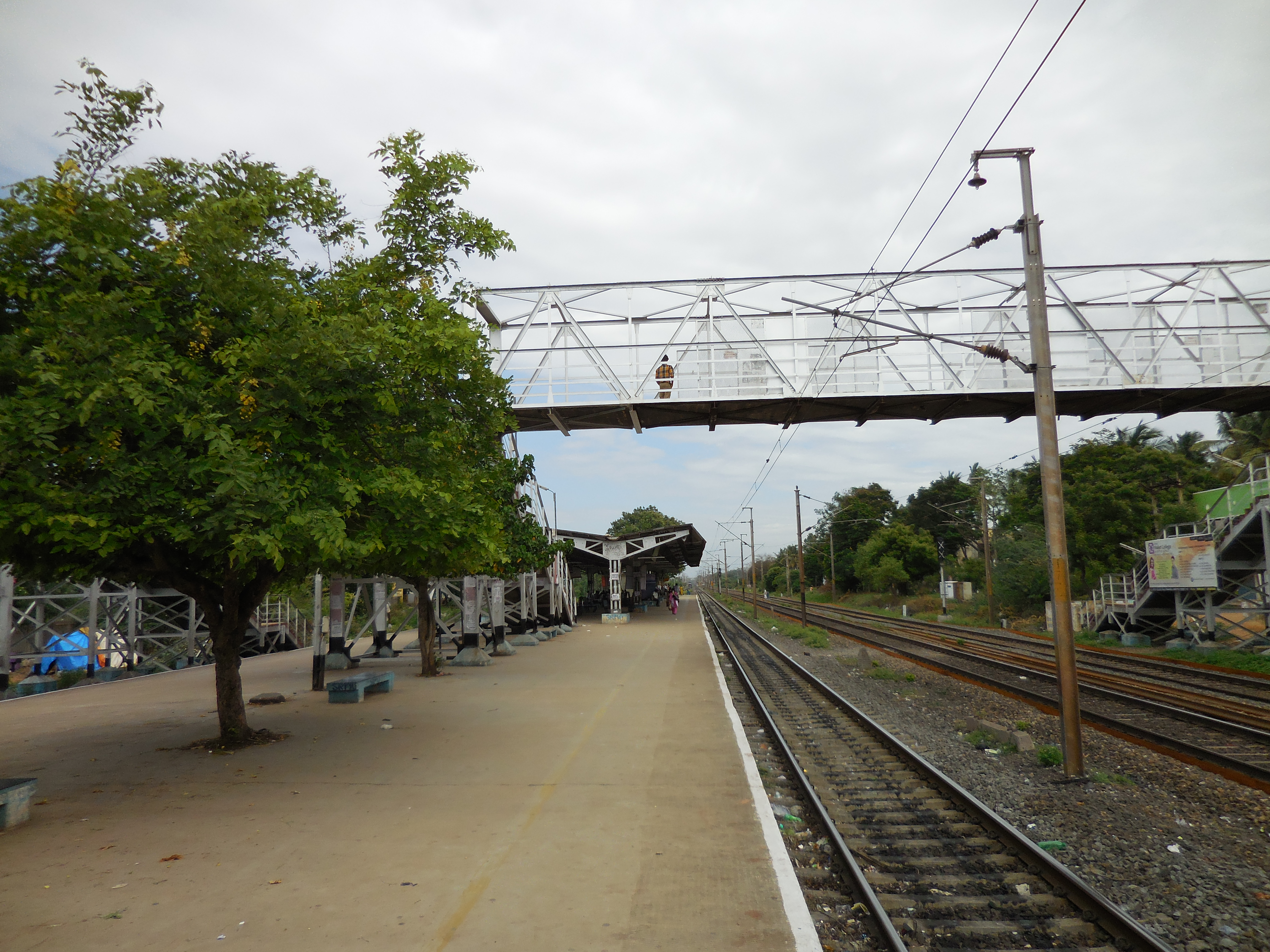
Footbridge at the station

== See also ==
- Chennai Suburban Railway
- Railway stations in Chennai
