= Pattaravakkam =

Neighborhood in Chennai, India

Coordinates: 13.1146°N 80.1658°E

Pattaravakkam is a small sub-urban locality in the north-west part of Chennai, Kanchipuram district, India. It comes under the Ambattur municipality and situated along the Chennai-Mumbai railway. In 2011, the population of Pattaravakkam was 1,441.

Many of the residents are suburban commuters and work in one of major industrial complexes of North Chennai. It also houses all the textile industry. The neighbourhood is served by Pattaravakkam railway station of the Chennai Suburban Railway.located around 3 km away from ambattur bus stand and railway station. It harbour lot of small scale industries like paints, dyes, chemical pharmaceutical, engineering industries. Good road connects to city. Large scale of woman are employed in these industries.
