= Ambattur Lake =

Reservoir in Tamil Nadu, India

Ambattur aeri
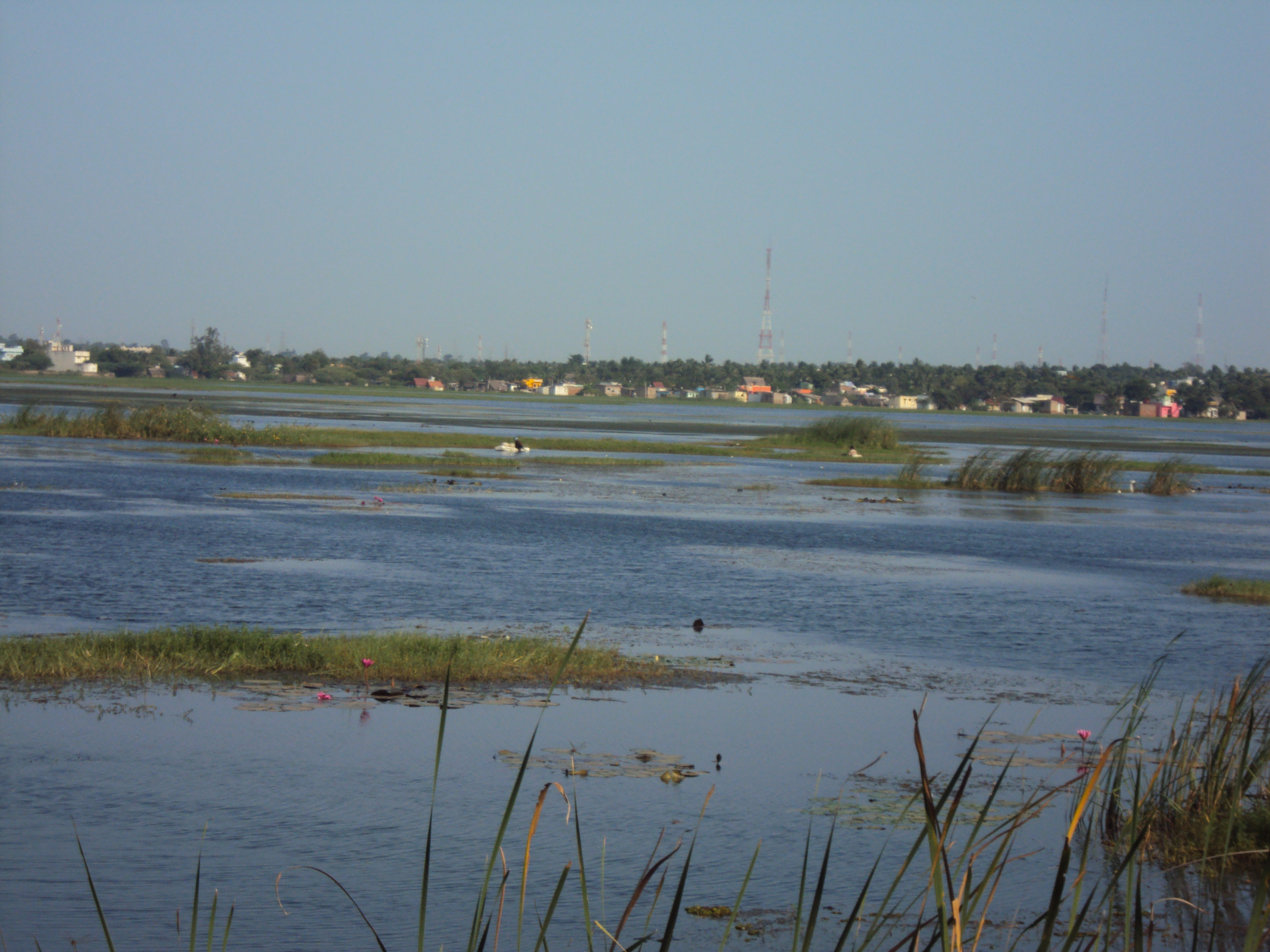
- Ambattur Lake

- Location within Tamil Nadu
- Location: Ambattur, Chennai, Tamil Nadu, India
- Coordinates: 13.10°N 80.14°E
- Type: Reservoir
- Basin countries: India
- Surface area: 440 acres (180 ha) (water spread area)
- Settlements: Chennai

Ambattur Aeri, or Ambattur Lake, is a rain-fed reservoir which reaches top levels during the monsoon seasons. In November 2008, incessant monsoon rain filled the lake and encroachments on the north and south banks of the lake were demolished. It also caters to the drinking water needs of the Chennai city after Poondi and Chembarambakkam Lake.

Ambattur Lake is one of a chain of three water bodies, including Korattur Lake and Madhavaram Lake, where surplus water from one is transported to another.

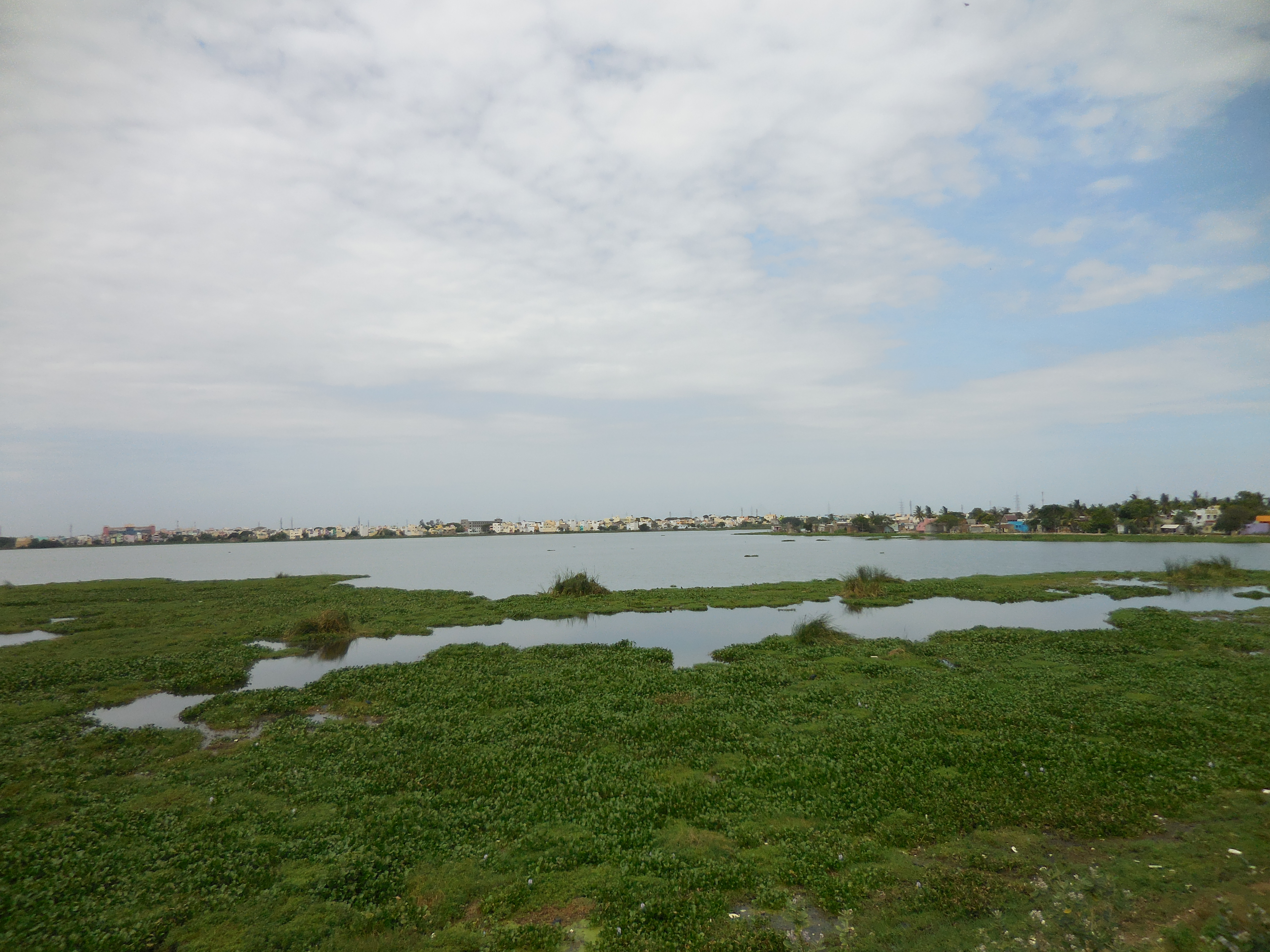
The lake as seen during a dry season

== Pollution ==
This lake is polluted chiefly by sewage waste in the Ayapakkam area.

== Biodiversity ==
Ambattur lake, together with the Korattur lake and the Retteri lake, is an important wildlife refuge in northern and western parts of Chennai. According to the Care Earth Trust, a city-based biodiversity research organisation, nearly 40 bird species are present in these lakes, including common tailorbird, the purple-rumped sunbird, and the migratory Asian openbill stork.

== See also ==
- Water management in Chennai
