= Pudhur =

Pudur
- Neighbourhood
- Location within Chennai Location within Tamil Nadu Location within India
- Coordinates: 13.0983°N 80.1622°E
- Country: India
- State: Tamil Nadu
- District: Chennai district
- Metro: Chennai
- Elevation: 17 m (56 ft)

Languages
  - Official: Tamil
- Time zone: UTC+5:30 (IST)
- PIN: 600 053
- Vehicle registration: TN-13

Pudur is a locality in Chennai, Ambattur (ward 80 of Chennai corporation), which is a large neighbourhood in Chennai City.

== History of Pudur ==
Pudur has developed from being a rural area along the Redhills high road to become one of the important residential localities of Ambattur. It was a part of the erstwhile Ambattur Municipality till October 2011. Now as per a G.O., Pudur (ward no. 80) has become a part of the zone 7, Ambattur, of the Chennai Corporation. Though Pudur has escalated itself from being a less-known suburb to a nominally decent suburban centre it still has not grown on par with the other localities in Ambattur itself. For instance it still lacks proper roads and connectivity albeit the Corporation of Chennai has been carrying on various infrastructure projects in full-swing which are expected to reach completion soon.

== Localities in Pudur ==
- Thirumalai Priya Nagar
- Bharat Ratna Rajiv Gandhi Nagar
- Banu Nagar (East and West)
- Balaji Nagar

== Transport in Pudur ==
Though Pudur has a good number of bus commuters it still does not have its own bus terminus, however there is a pending proposal to set up a bus terminus at Kallikuppam which is a mile away from Pudur. Bus services are there to Poonamallee (62), Avadi (62), Koyambedu, Vallalar Nagar (M248), Vandalur, Broadway, Tambaram (170L) and few private buses to Kanchipuram and Redhills. Share cabs remain the biggest logistics and transport service provider in Pudur.

== Notable establishments in Pudur ==
Tata Communications, Chennai is one kilometre away from Pudur.

== Policing ==
Pudur falls under the jurisdiction of the Greater Chennai Police, West zone, headquartered at Ambattur Industrial Estate.

== See also ==
Ambattur
