= Mangal Lake (Chennai) =

Mangal Aeri
- Location within Chennai
- Location: Mugappair, Chennai, Tamil Nadu, India
- Coordinates: 13°5′15″N 80°10′34″E
- Type: Lake
- Basin countries: India
- Surface area: 5.32 acres (2.15 ha)
- Settlements: Chennai

Mangal Aeri, or Mangal Lake, is a rain-fed reservoir in the neighbourhood of Mugappair in Chennai, India.

== History ==
The lake served as a water source for the village of Mugappair several hundred years ago. However, the lake started deteriorating since the establishment of Ambattur Industrial Estate abutting it owing to letting in of waste water from the industrial units. In 2005, renovation of the lake began at a cost of ₹ 2 million, with building a compound wall around an area of 30 acres. In July 2009, the first phase of the renovated lake was opened to public at a cost of ₹ 6 million.

== Infrastructure ==
The water body is spread over an area of 5.32 acres. In the first phase of renovation, a walkers' track measuring 4.5 m in width and 520 m in length was constructed around the lake and lighting facility was provided. Locations for children's play area was demarcated and a vacant space of about 20,000 sq ft was earmarked for a new park to be set up at a cost of ₹ 2.5 million in the second phase.

There is an Achalathamman temple on the bank of the lake.

The second phase of the project, however, has not yet been started.

== See also ==
- Water management in Chennai
