= Mogappair =

Mogappair முகப்பேர் J. J. Nagar
- Neighbourhood
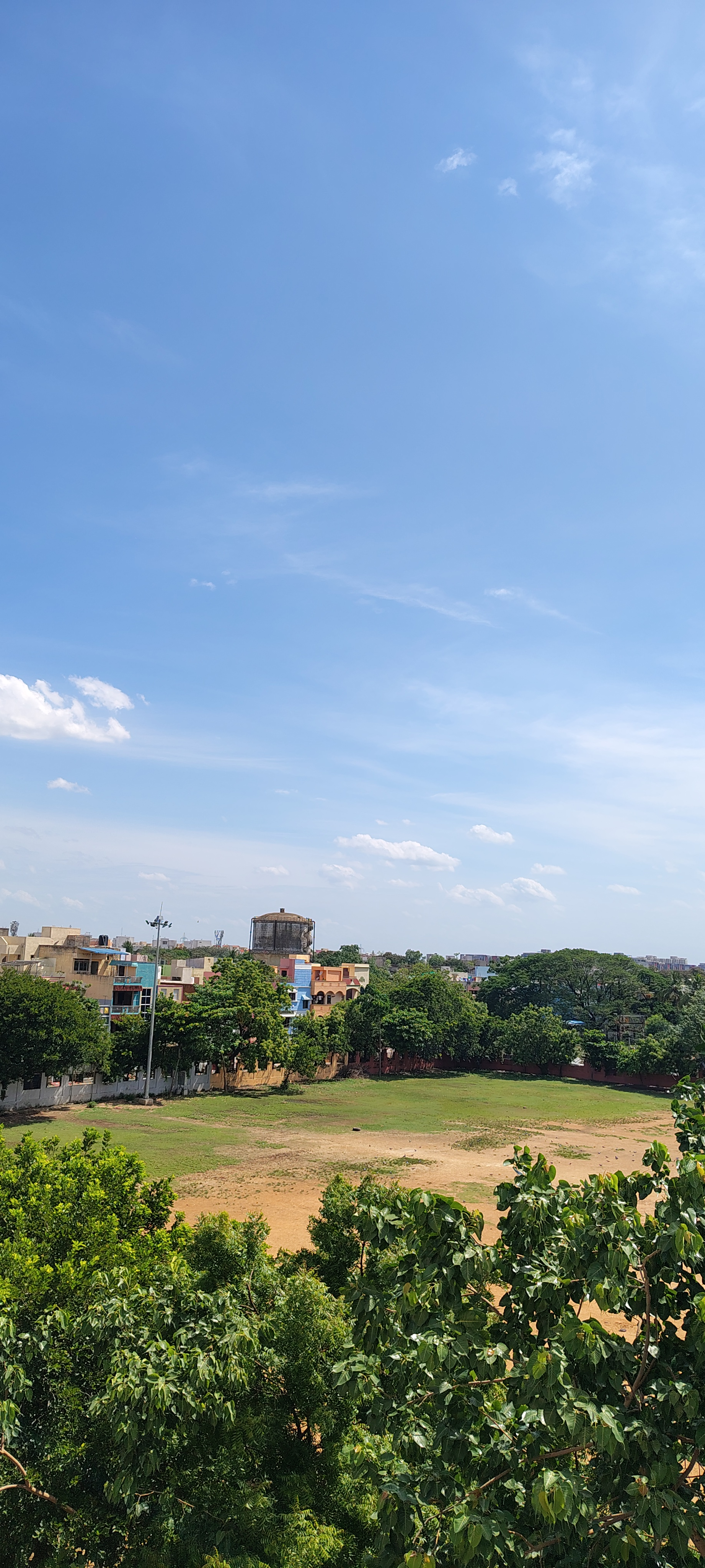
- Ambedkar Playground, Mogappair East

- Mogappair(Chennai) Mogappair (Tamil Nadu) Mogappair (India)
- Coordinates: 13.0805°N 80.1801°E
- Country: India
- State: Tamil Nadu
- District: Chennai
- Metro: Chennai

Government
  - Body: Greater Chennai Corporation

Languages
  - Official: Tamil
- Time zone: UTC+5:30 (IST)
- PIN: 600 037
- Vehicle registration: TN 13 (RTO, Ambattur)
- Vidhan Sabha constituency: Ambattur
- Lok Sabha constituency: Sriperumbudur
- Planning agency: CMDA
- Civic agency: Greater Chennai Corporation
- Website: www.chennai.tn.nic.in

Mogappair (also known as Dr. J. J. Nagar) is a residential neighborhood in north-western Chennai, India. It is located west of the Jawaharlal Nehru Road (Inner Ring Road) and is part of the Ambattur zone (7) of the Greater Chennai Corporation. There are industrial estates to the north and west, namely, Padi and Ambattur. Mogappair is located 3 km from Anna Nagar, 8 km from Avadi and 5 km from Ambattur.

There is an abundance of highly reputed schools, specialized hospitals and there has been a recent influx of IT offices in the industrial estates in and around Mogappair.

The Mangal Lake in the North Western part of Mogappair is the largest park in this region. A few decades ago, Mogappair was a small village, a part of which is still intact in the south-western part of Mogappair. Mogappair is divided into two parts, namely, Mogappair East and Mogappair West.

Notable people from Mogappair Logesh Dayalan and Saravana Balasubramani

== Etymology ==
There was a lake called Mugapeeri, from which the name of the locality was derived. After persistent mispronunciation, the name 'evolved' to its present form (Mogappair). Childless couples visit the temple in the locality and offer their prayers, and it is said that their wishes come true after the visit.The word for people in Tamil is "Makkal" and the fortune to possess anything is described by the word - "Peru". Hence, this place was originally called "Makkal-Peru" meaning "Fortune of begetting children". This name has later undergone linguistic modification to the modern-day name "Mogappair". Till date, many couple visit "Shri Santhana Srinivasa Perumal, temple" located in the west of Mogappair praying to be blessed with progeny.

== History ==
Mogappair in the beginning used to be a forest during the British era. A river used to flow in between the area now called as Eri scheme.

== Location ==
Mogappair is located on SH112 highway between Ambattur and Anna Nagar. Mogappair East and Mogappair West are twin localities which share and complement much of their resources and infrastructures alike. It is well connected by road & rail links. Located close to Ambattur, all west and east bound trains can be boarded from Ambattur, Pattaravakkam and Korattur. Long-distance bus & Indian Railways reservation counters are available in CMBT which is 3 km from Mogappair and Chennai International Airport is around 16 km from here. The nearest Metro Rail Stations are located in Thirumangalam and Koyambedu.

The Chennai bypass road NH4 joins from SH-112 near Ambattur and is Southbound towards Maduravoyal and Perungalathur. An underpass to access NH-4 from Ambattur is open for traffic on SH-112 between Nolambur and Ayappakkam.

Mogappair East was the first to be inhabited followed by Mogappair West and Nolambur.

== Transportation ==
Metropolitan Transport Corporation (MTC) runs passenger buses from Mogappair to major parts of the Chennai City. There are four bus terminals in Mogappair. They are J.J Nagar East, J.J.Nagar West (Mogappair East and Mogappair West), Mogappair Officer's Colony (Elango Nagar) and Mogappair (Mogappair Village). The nearest Metro Rail Station is Thirumangalam and Koyambedu.

=== Bus transport ===
Bus is the major mode of transport for the people of Mogappair. The locality is served by a bus terminus on Third Main Road. The terminus was developed by the Local Area Development Fund, including cementing the entire surface, construction of time keeper's office, water facilities and toilets and erecting two 60-foot-high high-mast lamps, one each at the entrance and at the exit. About 50,000 people use these terminus daily, from where about 50 buses on 15 routes are being operated daily, making about 400 trips daily. Mogappair Officer's Colony (Elango Nagar) is located on the Officer's Colony Road near Ambattur Estate Road. The frequency of buses, however, is very low from this terminal. Mogappair has a small bus stand on Venugopal Street between the east and the west bus terminals.

==== Mogappair East Bus Terminus ====
The Mogappair East terminus was opened in 1990. Located on Paari Salai and spread over a 1.5-acre area, it operates 21 buses a day, serving about 5,000 commuters daily. It was renovated in 2015 at a cost of ₹ 6 million.

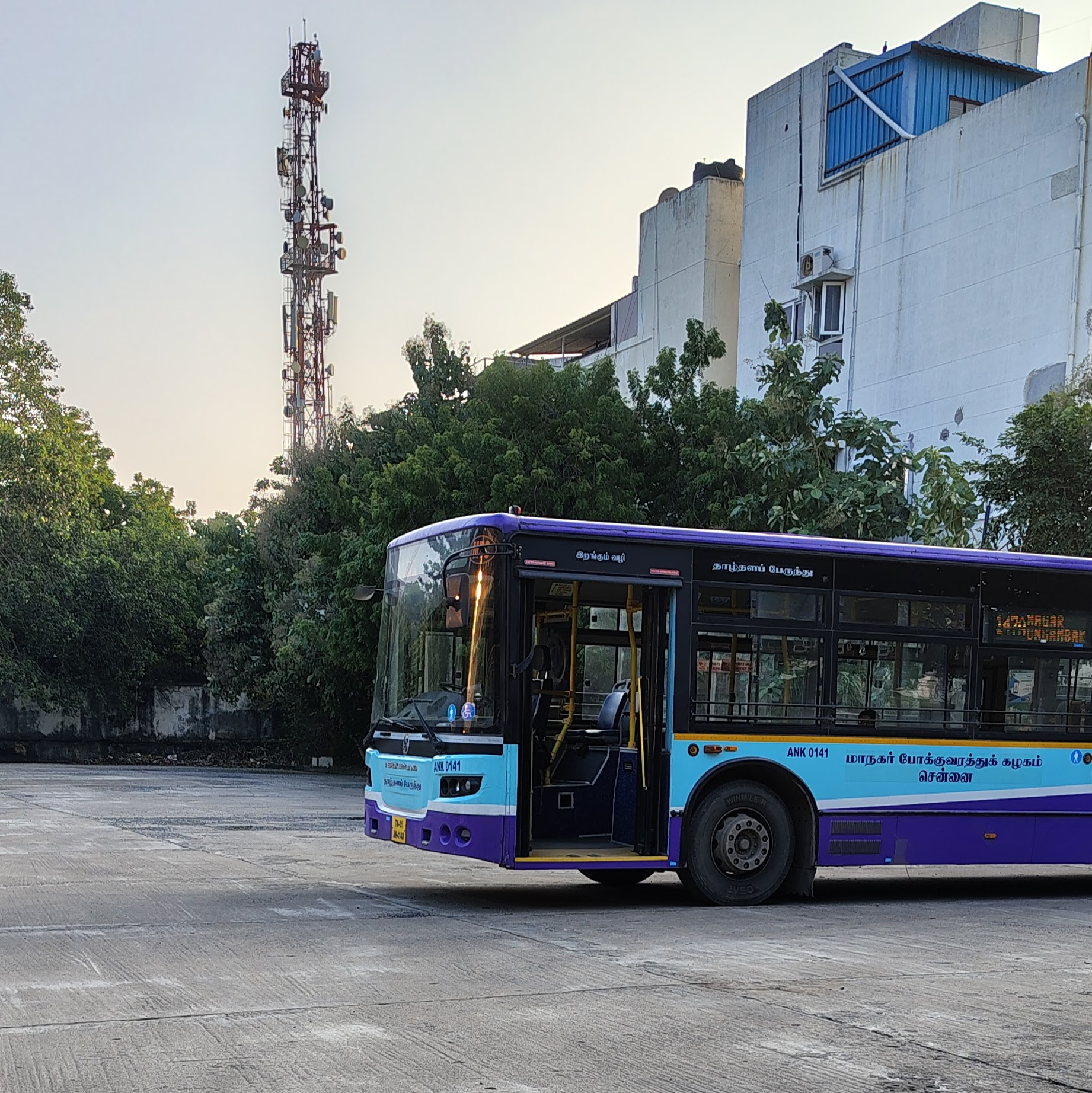
An Ashok Leyland low-floor bus at Mogappair East Bus Terminus

==== Mogappair West bus terminus ====
The terminus at Mogappair West was renovated in 2012. About 39 buses on 12 routes are being operated daily, with the vehicles making about 280 trips on a daily basis. The terminus serves about 30,000 commuters daily.

== Educational institutions ==
=== Schools ===
- Scope Global School (CBSE), Mogappair East
- Chennai Corporation Primary School, Sector-6, Mugappair West,
- Government High School, Mugappair West (TANK School)
- M G R Adarsh Senior Secondary School (CBSE), Mugappair East
- Bethany Nursery and Primary School, Reddy Palayam, Mugappair West.
- Dawn (CBSE) International School, Nolambur
- Ravindra Bharathi Global School (CBSE), Mogappair East
- Priya Matriculation Higher Secondary School, Mogappair West
- D.A.V. Matriculation Higher Secondary School, Mogappair East
- D.A.V. (Girls) Sr. Secondary School (CBSE), Mogappair
- D.A.V. (Boys) Senior Secondary School (CBSE), Mogappair
- Chennai Public School (CBSE), TVS Colony, Anna Nagar West
- Spartan Matriculation Higher Secondary School - Mogappair East
- Spartan Exclusive School - Mogappair East
- The Schram Academy International school (Nolumbur)
- Green Valley Central School (CBSE), Mogappair West
- SBIOA Model Matriculation Higher Secondary School, Mogappair Eri scheme
- Shamrock Matriculation Higher Secondary School, Mogappair East
- Vasantham - School for children with intellectual disabilities
- PMR Matriculation Higher Secondary School, Mogappair East
- Leo Matriculation Higher Secondary School
- Government Boys Higher Secondary School - Mogappair East
- Government Girls Higher Secondary School - Mogappair East
- Amutha Matriculation Higher Secondary School - Mogappair West
- Sri Krishnammal Matric Higher Secondary School- Mogappair East
- Velammal Matriculation Higher Secondary School - Mogappair East
- Velammal Matriculation Higher Secondary School - Mogappair West
- Nethrodaya school for visually challenged
- Velammal Matriculation Higher Secondary School - TS Krishna Nagar
- Sri Chaitanya CSBE School Mogappair west

=== Colleges ===
- Mar Gregorious College of Arts & Science - Mogappair West
- Thai Moogambigai Dental College and Hospital - Golden George Nagar, Mogappair
- Thai Moogambigai Polytechnic - Golden George Nagar, Mogappair
- MMM College of Nursing - Mogappair East
- MMM Academy Of Medical Sciences - Mogappair West

=== Art School/ Pre-School ===
- Eurokids Pre-school Mogappair.
- Kalaikkottam Dance School.
- Mar Gregorious college of arts and science
- EdYou Playschool and Daycare
- Arise 'n' Shine International Preschool

=== Oriental Schools / Schools for Religious and Value Education ===
- Sri Namaami Mutt Oriental School of Western Education, Mogappair East

== Hospitals ==
- Dr. Anji Dental Care, Mogappair West
- Birla Ayurveda
- Shifa health centre
- Kavitha Clinic - Dr. Sampath, Mogappair West
- Holistic Health Center, Mogappair West
- Denticare (Dr.Gnanaraj BDS., MSAID Australia) Dental & implant Clinic
- Annai Clinic - Dr.Sugirtharaj Samuel, Mogappair West
- GBR Clinic - Fertility Centre
- MMM Hospitals (Madras Medical Mission)
- Frontier Lifeline Hospitals (Dr. K. M. Cherian Heart Foundation)
- Vidhya's Eversmile Dental Clinic
- Trinity dental clinic (Dr.Joseph Anand MDS.)
- The Dental and Orthodontic Centre ( Dr. Abdur Rafeeq M.D.S.)
- Take Care Hospital
- Srinivas Eye Hospital
- Raj Nursing Home
- Chennai Hospital
- Apollo Hospital (Vanagaram to Amattur Main Road, Ayanambakkam)
- Vasan Eye Care Hospital
- KURINJI Holistic Health Care Center (Siddha, Ayurvedic, Yoga And Naturopathy Center)
- Vishnu Eye Care Clinic
- Raghavi hospital
- Sundaram Medical Foundation
- Pranav Eye Hospital
- Sam Child Care Centre

== Local newsletters ==
Mogappair Talk, Mogappair Mail, Mogappair Times, Town Express and Town News are some of the local newsletters which are bilingual (English and Tamil).
