= Chennai–Thiruvallur High Road =

Arterial Road in Chennai, India

Chennai - Thiruvallur High Road

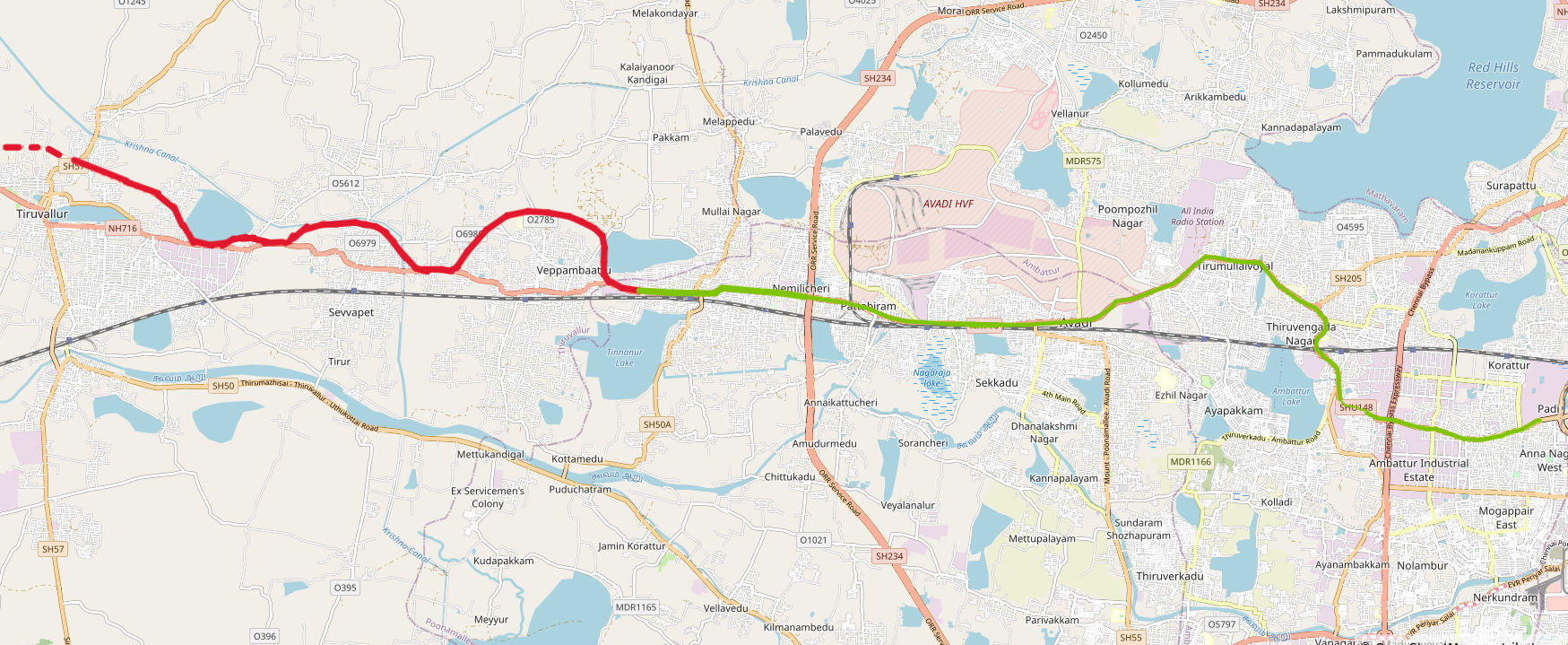
- Map of Chennai-Thiruvallur High Road with NH 716 highlighted in red SH-U 148 highlighted in green

Route information
- Maintained by National Highways Authority of India, Tamil Nadu State Highways Department
- Length: 35 km (22 mi)
- Component highways: NHAI, TN-SH

Major junctions
- East end: Padi Junction, Chennai
- Ambattur Estate Jn; NH 32 Telephone Exchange Jn; Dunlop Jn; Ambattur-Redhills Rd Jn; Avadi-Poonamallee Road Jn; Outer Ring Road Jn, Pattabiram; Peripheral Ring Road Jn, Putlur
- West end: Thiruvallur

Location
- Country: India
- State: Tamil Nadu

Highway system
- Roads in India; Expressways; National; State; Asian; State Highways in Tamil Nadu

Chennai–Thiruvallur High Road (CTH Road), formerly known as Madras–Thiruvallur High Road (or MTH Road), is a major road connecting northwestern suburbs of Chennai, India. Starting from Padi Junction, this arterial road connects the suburbs of Padi, Ambattur, Thirumullaivoyal, Avadi, Pattabiram, Thirunindravur and Thiruvallur. It is one of the four national highways out of Chennai city, part of NH 716 and SH-U 148.

The road, however, is narrow with a width of 8–10 metres. Over 46,000 – 88,000 vehicles use the road every day. The morning Peak Hour per direction (PHPD) traffic of CTH road is 3400 – 7000 vehicles with Peak Hour share of 8%.

== Road Characteristics ==
The road begins at Padi junction in Chennai and runs about 22 km in the Chennai metropolitan area (CMA) up to Thirunindravur, from where it runs a further 59 km to reach Tiruttani. According to official Indian Roads Congress norms, this road is supposed to be 32 m (105 ft) wide, but currently it is only 10 m (33 ft) wide in many stretches.

== Road Transfer and Developments ==
The Chennai–Thiruvallur High Road (CTH Road), originally part of NH-205 (later renumbered NH‑716), was de-notified as a National Highway due to expansion limitations and transferred to the Tamil Nadu State Highways Department in 2013. The stretch for 22 kms from Padi to Thirunindravur, is now classified as State Highway Urban 148 (SH-U 148) and maintained by the State Highways (Construction and Maintenance) Department.

In 2013, the Tamil Nadu government proposed widening the Padi–Thiruninravur stretch into a six-lane road, with the first phase involving four-laning with a center median at a cost of ₹98 crore. However, the plan faced opposition from local traders’ associations, including the Tamil Nadu Vanigar Sangankalin Peravai, leading to project delays for many years.

In May 2025, land acquisition notices were issued to 153 property owners in Thirumullaivoyal for acquiring 3.5 acres as part of the expansion process. Public consultations were scheduled for June 5, 2025. The move marked the formal resumption of the widening project, which had seen limited progress in earlier years.

== Landmarks and Urban Development ==
CTH Road passes through key suburban and industrial areas of Chennai, including Ambattur, Avadi, and Thiruninravur. The road is already home to the well-established Ambattur Industrial Estate, one of South India's largest Small and Medium-scale Industrial Hubs and home to some of the data centers.

In addition, TIDEL Park Pattabiram, a 21-storey IT complex is the tallest building along the stretch. This IT park is expected to enhance employment opportunities and spur commercial growth in the western corridor of the city.

=== Road-over Bridges and Metro Connectivity ===
In 2019, the Tamil Nadu Highways Department planned four flyovers on the 22-km road via key junctions at Padi, Ambattur Estate, Dunlop and Avadi. In 2025, following Chennai Metro's plan to construct a metro corridor from Koyambedu to Pattabiram, the highways department revised its project by planning to integrate three of the four planned flyovers with metro line and additionally expand two railway overbridges.

Flyovers planned along CTH road
Flyover	Junction served	Length	Connectivity
Avadi flyover	Avadi-Mount Poonamallee Road junction	2.2 km (1.4 mi)	To be integrated with metro line
Dunlop flyover	Ambattur-Vanagaram Road junction	1.1 km (0.68 mi)	To be integrated with metro line
Ambattur Estate flyover	Ambattur Industrial Estate Bus Terminus junction	1.1 km (0.68 mi)	To be integrated with metro line
Korattur junction flyover	Padi-East Avenue Road junction	TBD	Standalone

== Gallery ==
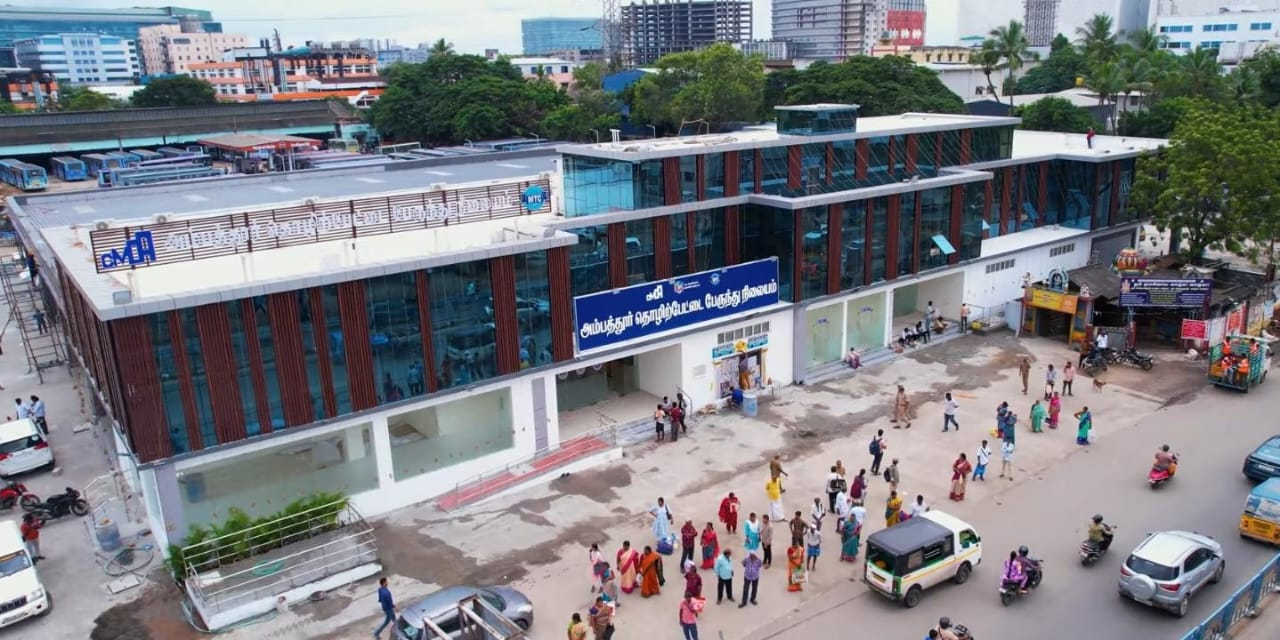
Aerial view of Ambattur Estate Bus stand from CTH road

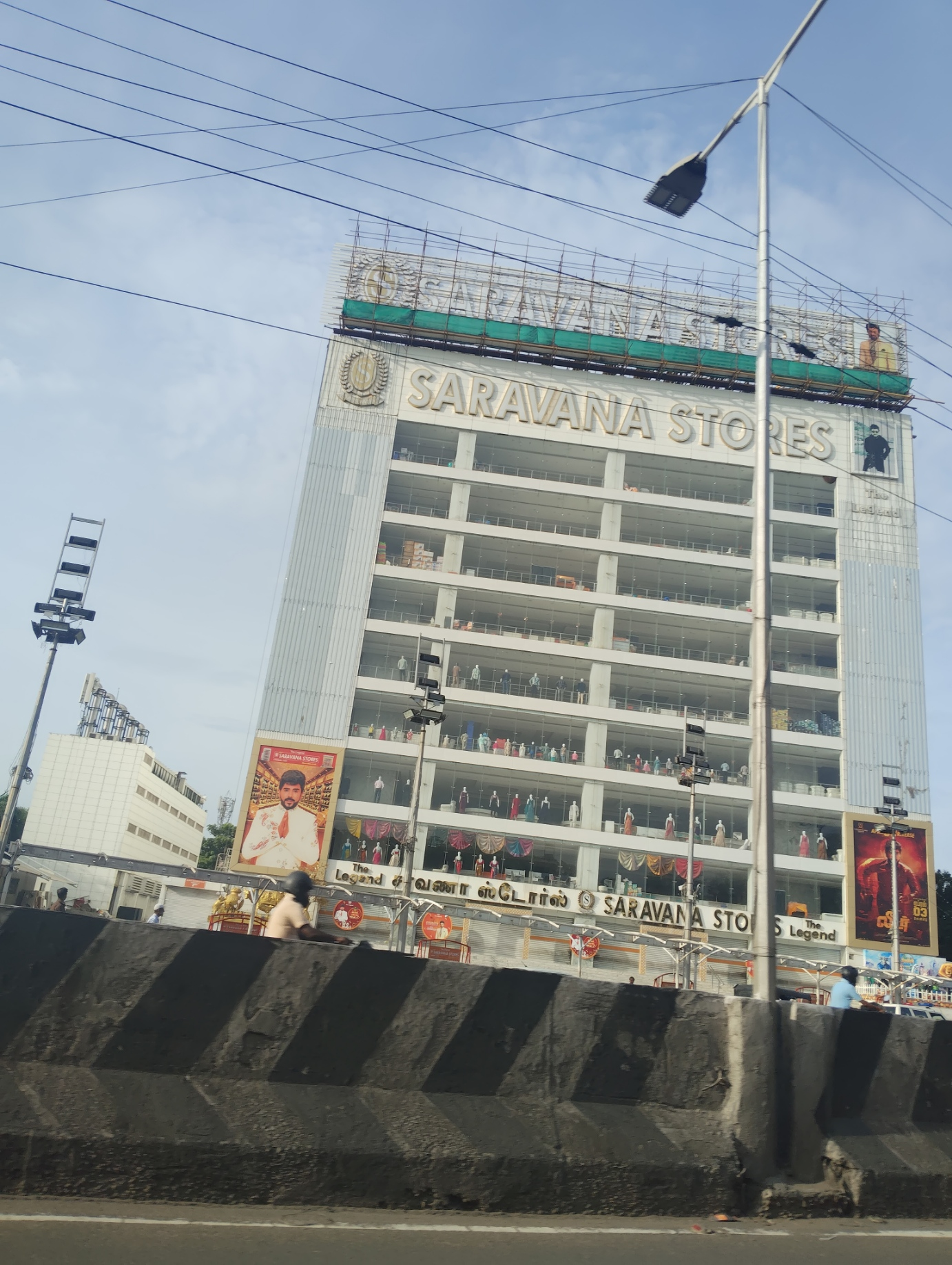
Saravana Stores Padi, viewed from CTH Road

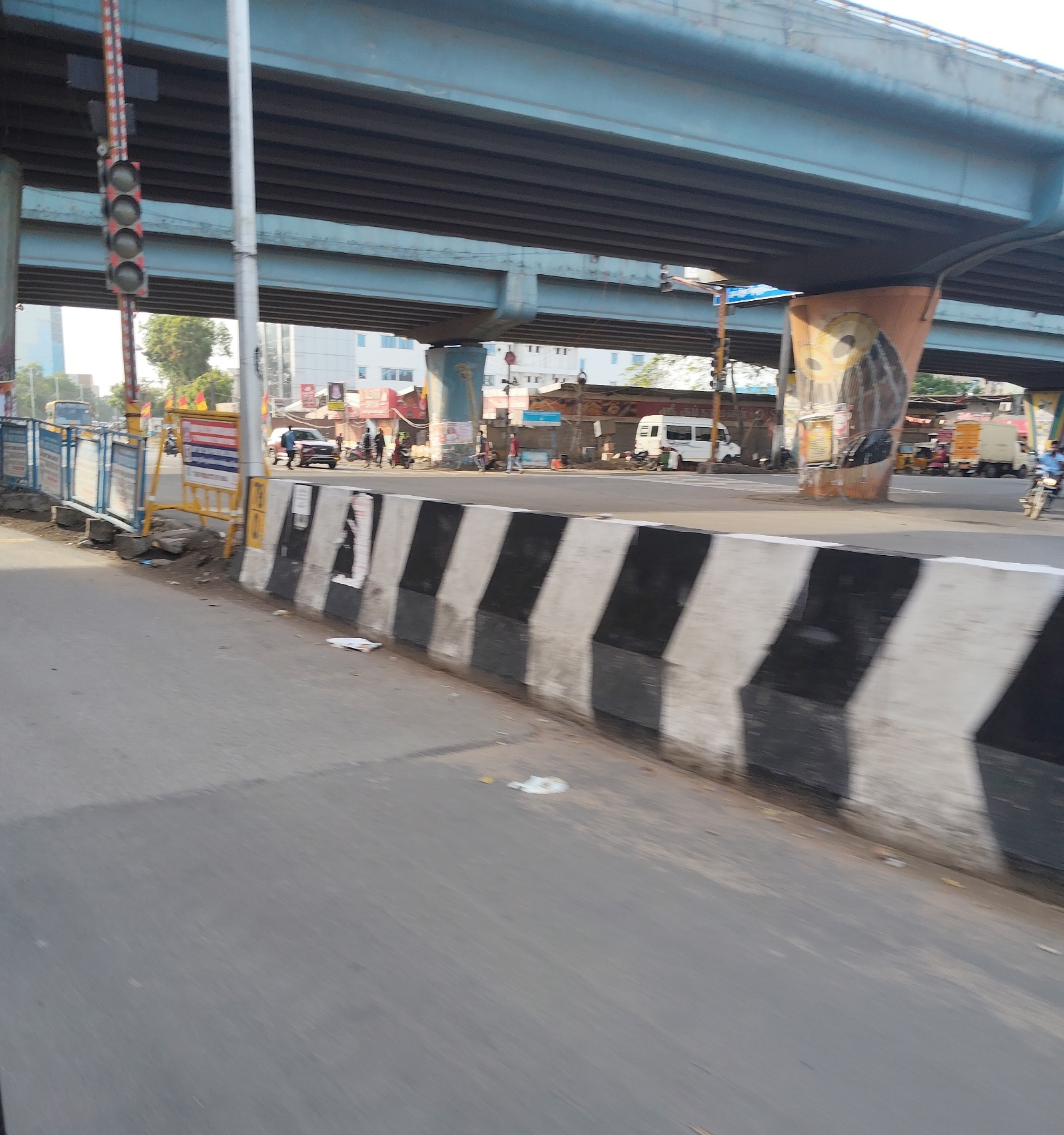
Ambattur Telephone Exchange–Chennai Bypass Road junction

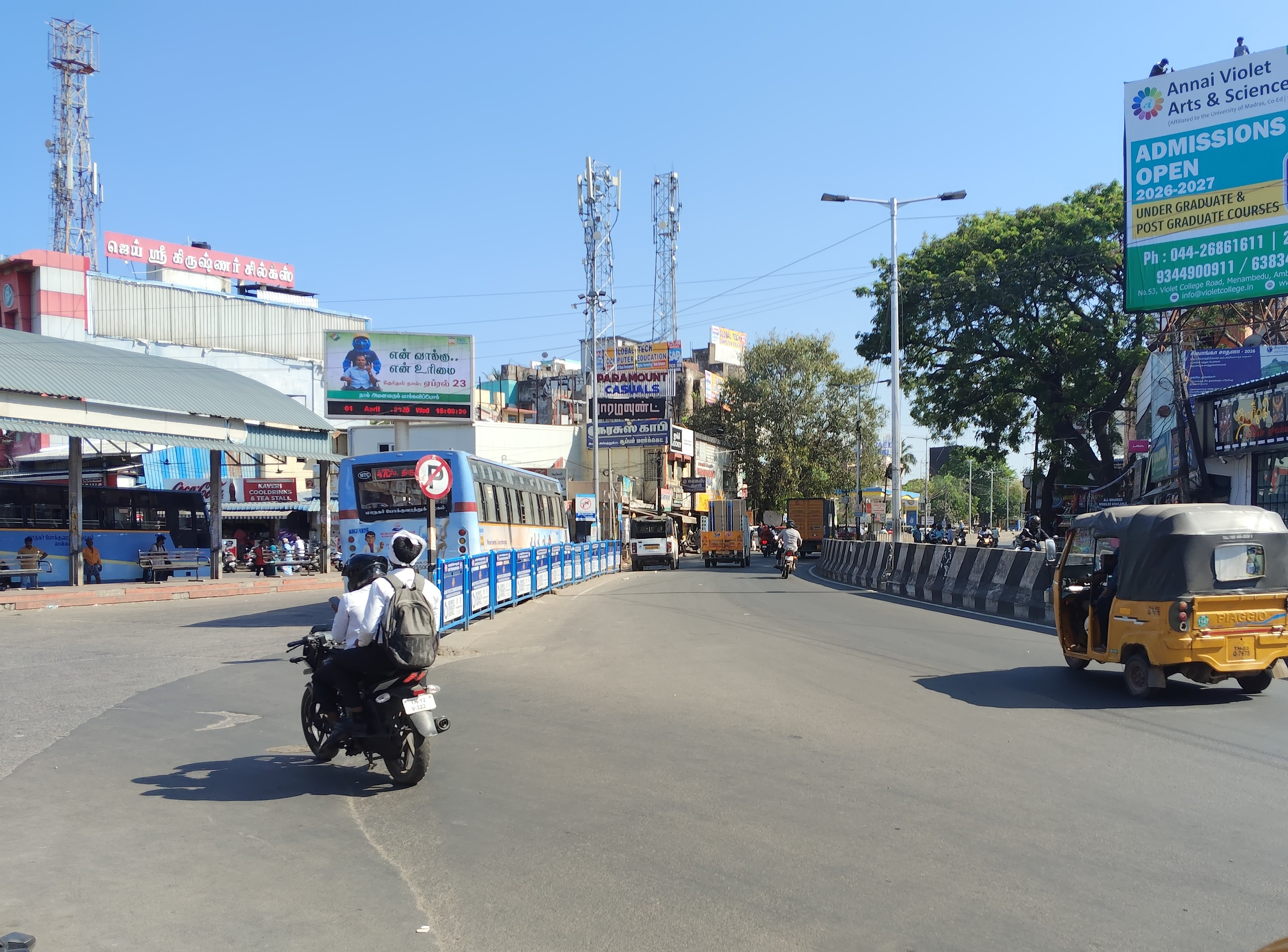
CTH Road stretch at Ambattur OT bus stand

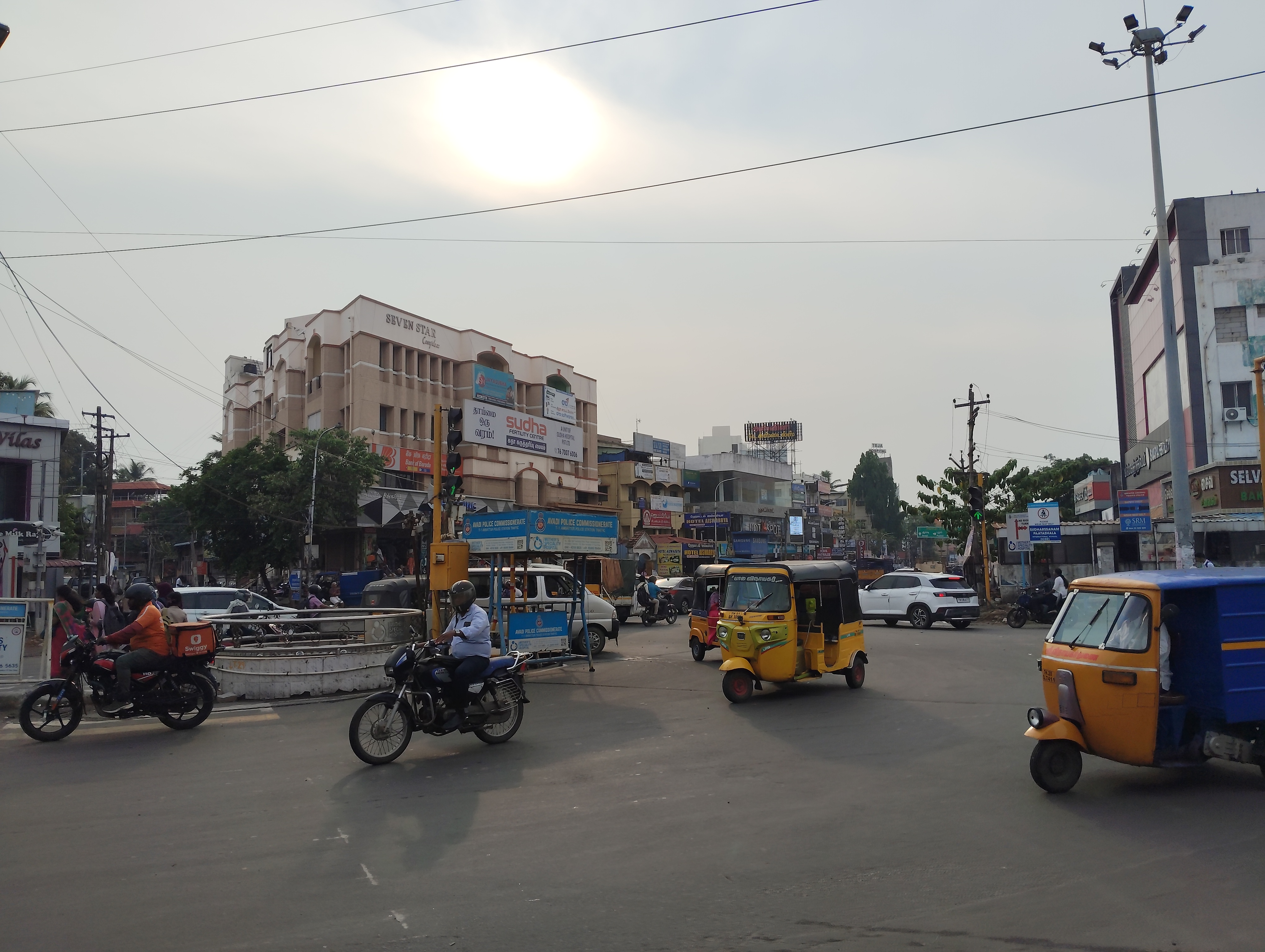
Ambattur OT-Redhills Road junction near Singappore Shopping complex

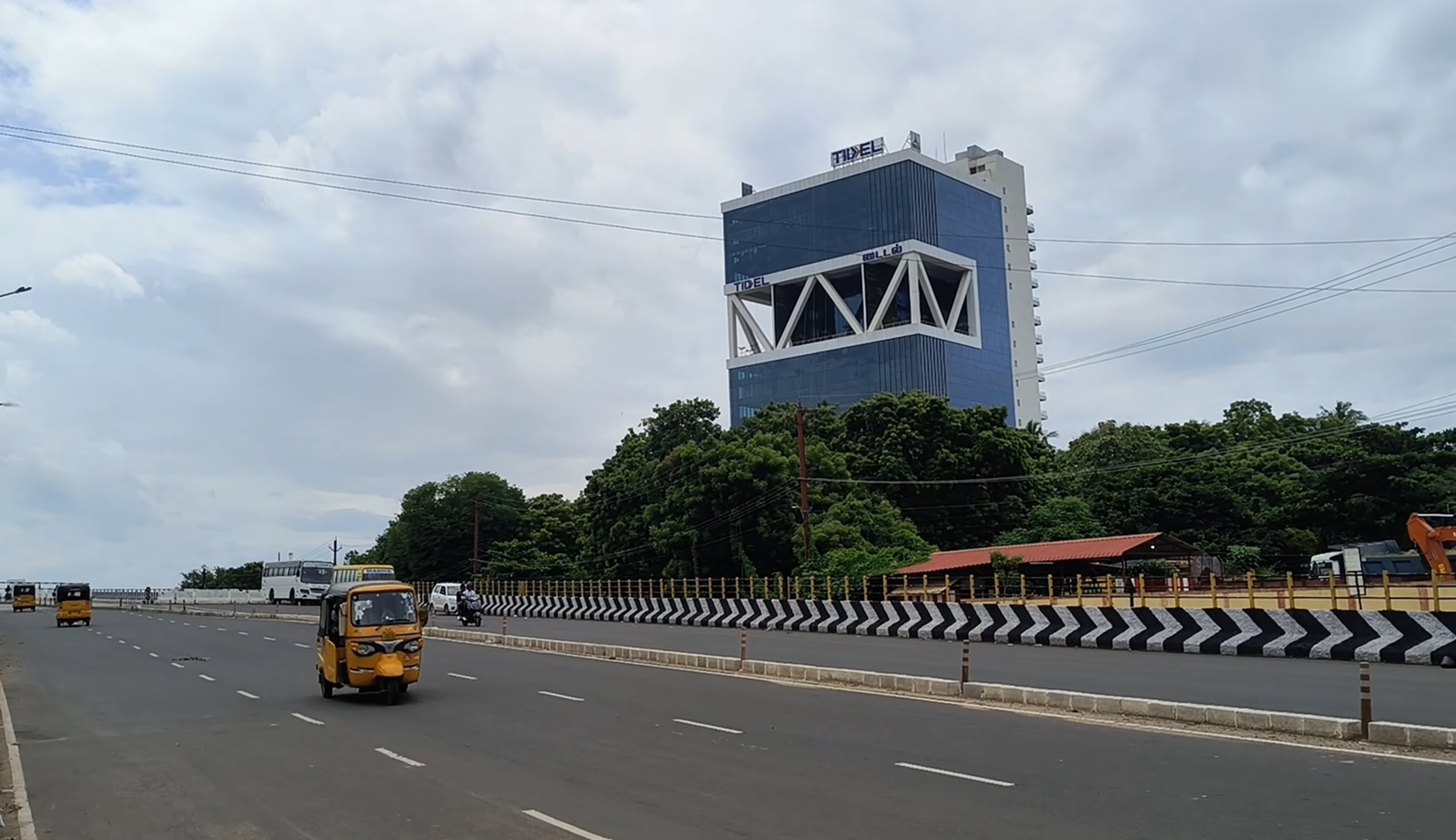
TIDEL Park, Pattabiram seen from CTH Road

== See also ==
- Transport in Chennai
- List of state highways in Tamil Nadu
