= Sir Ivan Stedeford Hospital =

- AMM Foundation

Geography
- Location: No. 7, Chennai–Thiruvallur High Road, Shobha Nagar, Ambattur, Chennai, Tamil Nadu, India
- Coordinates: 13.1255°N 80.1442°E

Organisation
- Care system: For-profit
- Type: Full-service medical center & hospital

Services
- Beds: 212

History
- Opened: 25 February 1966

Links
- Website: http://www.stedefordhospital.org/

Sir Ivan Stedeford Hospital is a multi-speciality hospital in Ambattur, Chennai, India. The hospital is named after Sir Ivan Stedeford, the British industrialist and philanthropist. The hospital was opened on 25 February 1966 and is managed by the AMM Foundation. It is situated 3 km from the Ambattur rail-bridge on the Ambattur–Avadi road, about a kilometer from the Ambattur–Red Hills Road intersection. The hospital has been certified with ISO 9001-2008 for Quality Health Care Service by BVQI, London in 2010.

== History ==
The hospital was named after Sir Ivan Stedeford, chairman of Tube Investments, U.K., who was instrumental in starting the TI factory and TII complex in India. Sir Ivan signed a joint venture agreement with A. M. Murugappa Chettiar of the Murugappa Group, which was then a small business house manufacturing sandpaper and abrasives for the war effort and also trading war surplus. It was the first joint venture agreement to be signed in South India after Independence. This resulted in the establishment of the TI Cycle factory in a mango grove in Ambattur by 1951, and manufacture of the 'Hercules India' bicycle soon began. By 1954, the word 'India' was dropped from the name when international quality standards were met.

In 1954, Sir Ivan signed his second joint venture, Tube Products India, with the Murugappa family. The factory was established on what had been the British Government of Malaya's Immigration Camp. By 1956, production was started in the new factory and soon resulted in the establishment of other TI factories in the Ambattur-Avadi industrial stretch. This led to a rapid growth in population in the region and several public amenities were established in Ambattur by TI company, such as the Sir Ramaswami Mudaliar Higher Secondary School (named after the person who had initially introduced the partners to each other), a post office and a bank. When the growing population demanded a hospital, the company decided to establish one between Ambattur and Avadi.

The other Arcot Twin, Sir Lakshmanaswami Mudaliar, was consulted for the hospital plans who suggested, "Don't give anything free; it will not be appreciated. Charge four or eight annas for an outpatient and Rs. 3 or Rs. 5 for a bed, and they'll not only pay but also appreciate what you are doing for the area."

Upon knowing the plans to build a hospital, Sir Ivan replied, "I'm delighted. And I'll do my bit. It won't be very much. I am not, as many think, a rich man. But I will gladly contribute to the project." He denoted a gift of around £5,000 and also arrived to inaugurate the hospital in 1966. AMM Charities Trust, later known as AMM Foundation, started managing the hospital. The in-patient facility in the hospital was started in 1967 with 100 beds. The bed count was increased to 125 in 1985, to 175 in 1997, and to 200 in 2000.

== The hospital today ==
The hospital receives about 450,000 patients a year and performs nearly 5,000 surgeries every year. The hospital has 10 modern dialysis machines to cater to the needs of patients with kidney diseases. It handles over 1,000 outpatients a day and serves 40 villages around Ambattur–Avadi neighbourhoods.

== See also ==
- Healthcare in Chennai
