= Nolambur =

- Neighbourhood
- Nolambur(Chennai) Nolambur (Tamil Nadu) Nolambur (India)
- Coordinates: 13.0805°N 80.1801°E
- Country: India
- State: Tamil Nadu
- District: Chennai
- Metro: Chennai

Languages
  - Official: Tamil
- Time zone: UTC+5:30 (IST)
- PIN: 600 095
- Vehicle registration: TN 12 (RTO: Poonamallee)

Nolambur is the neighbourhood in the western part of Mogappair West, Chennai. It is near to the Poonamallee High Road near Maduravoyal, Mogappair West, Ambattur, Ayanambakkam, and Athipet. Road access from the north is from Mogappair and Ambattur Industrial Estate. Nolambur is located adjacent to Maduravoyal and Nerkundram, which are situated at its south boundaries. Bharathi Salai and its continuation Nolambur Phase II road are 70 ft wide. They form the primary route of travelling for the residents nearby. The Inner ring road runs in the western fringes of Nolambur making it a place for rapid connectivity from all part of Chennai City. A few buses also ply through this area.

Important Residential units include Casagrand Tudor, Brigade Xanadu, S and P Garden, Jains Sunderbans Apartments, Fomra Tribhuvan, VGN Minerva Apartments, Akshya Pacific City, City Light Meadows, DABC's various apartments and Jains Nakshatra. As of 2026, the tallest building in the neighbourhood is the 22-storied, three-towered Casagrand Crescendo apartment buildings.

== Schools ==
- DAV Group of Schools
- Velammal Group of Schools
- Dawn School
- Maharishi Vidya Mandir
- Green Valley Matriculation & Higher Secondary School
- Schram Academy
- Spartan School
- Sri Chaitanya
- Aachi Global School,
- Birla Open Minds International School

== See also ==
- Ambattur
- Maduravoyal
- Mogappair
- Ayappakkam
