= Padi railway station =

Defunct railway station in Chennai, India

Padi

General information
- Location: Padi, Chennai, Tamil Nadu, India
- Coordinates: 13.103649°N 80.194893°E
- System: Indian Railways and Chennai Suburban Railway station
- Owner: Ministry of Railways, Indian Railways
- Line: West line of Chennai Suburban Railway
- Platforms: 1
- Tracks: 1

Construction
- Structure type: Standard on-ground station

Other information
- Fare zone: Southern Railways

History
- Closed: 2007
- Former names: South Indian Railway
Location
- Location within India Location within Tamil Nadu

Padi railway station is one of the two, now defunct, railway stations of the extended southern arm of the Chennai Central–Arakkonam section of the Chennai Suburban Railway Network, the other one being Anna Nagar railway station. It served the neighbourhoods of Padi, Villivakkam, Korattur and Anna Nagar. The station is located at the junction of 100-feet Inner Ring Road—MTH Road, known as the Padi Junction. The station is being maintained by the Integral Coach Factory (ICF), the premier production unit of the Indian railways.

== History ==
In 2003, a 3.09 km-long railway line, initially used by the Integral Coach Factory (ICF) at Perambur for moving newly built coaches from shell to furnishing division of the factory, was strengthened at a cost of ₹ 72.9 million for operating passenger services. Two new stations, namely, Padi and Anna Nagar, were built and 13 existing bridges were renovated and the work was completed in five months. The railway station and the EMU services were inaugurated by the then Union Minister of State for Railways, A. K. Moorthy. Between 2003 and 2007, five suburban trains were being run from Anna Nagar to Chennai Beach via Villivakkam. In 2007, the service was discontinued due to construction of a rotary at the Padi junction replacing the level-crossing. Though the rotary was completed in 2009, services were not restored. However, in 2011, the railways planned to resume services in this section as a feeder service with six-car EMUs.

The tracks and land on which the station is built were originally owned by the ICF. When the Southern Railway intended to operate trains to Padi and Anna Nagar stations, the ICF handed over the land to the Southern Railway. When the train services were withdrawn in 2007, the ICF reclaimed the land from the zonal railway. The tracks and the stations are now used by the ICF for moving spare parts to the manufacturing unit and back.

== Patronage ==
The service during its operational years, however, had a low patronage.

However, unlike the rest of the Chennai Suburban Railway network, there is only one line in this section. In addition, the traffic congestion resulting due to closure of a gate near the Padi railway station limited the operation to five pairs of EMU services between Chennai Beach and Anna Nagar.

== Upgradations ==
=== Additional lines ===
Three separate tracks, each 500 meters long and accommodating 20 coaches, are being built on the northern side of the station. These lines will be used to park new coaches built by the ICF until they are transported to their destinations. A 2-km long high-speed rail line between the station and the ICF will also be laid at the station for conducting trials. The lines will be used to test semi-high speed coaches running up to 160 km per hour.

=== Conversion to social hub ===
In 2018, the ICF began to convert the defunct station into a social meeting point by building a 500-meter walkers’ path at a cost of ₹ 1.5 million and providing seating arrangements, lightings, security and other amenities. It also planted about 300 saplings at the station. The meeting hub will cater to people from nearby residential areas such as Villivakkam, Padi, Korattur and Anna Nagar. The residents are allowed in the station premises both in the morning and in the evening. The overall cost of the project was ₹ 29 million, funded by the general funds of the ICF.

== See also ==
- Chennai Suburban Railway
- Railway stations in Chennai
