= Kurungaleeswarar Temple =

Shiva temple in Chennai district, Tamil Nadu, India

- Kurungaleeswarar Temple, Koyambedu, Chennai, Tamil Nadu

Religion
- Affiliation: Hinduism
- District: Chennai
- Deity: Kurungaleeswarar

Location
- Location: Koyambedu, Chennai
- State: Tamil Nadu
- Country: India
- Interactive map of Kurungaleeswarar Temple
- Coordinates: 13.0731°N 80.1974°E

Architecture
- Elevation: 31.87 m (105 ft)

Kurungaleeswarar Temple is a historically important Shiva temple in the neighbourhood of Koyambedu, Chennai, India. The temple encloses a large tank and dates from the Medieval Chola period.

== Etymology ==
The name of the neighbourhood comes from ko meaning horse, ambu meaning arrow, and pedu meaning fence, when Lava and Kusha caught the horse sent by Rama in a fence made of arrows.

== Mythology and History ==
This temple was believed to be developed by Valmiki while Sita has come down with heavy heart after separating from Lord Rama. She had been worshipping Siva and she gave birth for Lava and Kusha. Both have been growing well with the support of Valmiki. One day the Aswamedha Yagna was conducted by Lord Rama at Ayodhya and the horse was running away and reached this place, which is presently called Koyembedu. Earlier it was called Kosai. The horse has to be traced and brought back to the place where Yagna was started. But these two children of Rama kept the horse and firmly resisted Lord Rama's battalion. Finally Lakshman also came and he was also defeated. Finally Lord Rama had to enter into the battle and his sons were preparing. Fortunately, Saint Valmiki made the children realise that they are going to fight against their own father and vice versa. After this the Ram family was united and from then on, this temple is known for family unity and togetherness as Shiva was the cause for the re-uniting of Lord Ram's family.

The temple dates back to the 12th-century Kulothunga Chola period.

== Sri Kurungaleewarar (Kusalavapureeswarar) ==
Kurungaleeswarar Temple is a Hindu Temple dedicated to Lord Shiva located in the neighbourhood of Koyambedu in Chennai City of Tamil Nadu. This temple is situated on the banks of river Cooum at Koyambedu. The presiding deity is called Kurungaleeswarar or Kuchalavapureeswarar and the goddess is called Dharmasamvardhini or Aram Valartha Nayagi. Sthalavriksham (the divine tree of the temple) is a jack tree.

== See also ==
- Heritage structures in Chennai
- Religion in Chennai
