= Kallikuppam =

- Neighbourhood
- Location within Chennai Location within Tamil Nadu Location within India
- Coordinates: 13.130973°N 80.174862°E
- Country: India
- State: Tamil Nadu
- District: Chennai
- Metro: Chennai
- Zone: Ambattur Zone No 7
- Ward: kallikuppam (Ward 82)
- Elevation: 15 m (49 ft)

Languages
  - Official: Tamil, English
- Time zone: UTC+5:30 (IST)
- PIN: 600053
- Telephone code: 044
- Vehicle registration: TN-13
- Planning agency: CMDA
- City: Chennai
- Lok Sabha constituency: Sriperumbudur
- Vidhan Sabha constituency: Ambattur

Kallikuppam is a locality in Ambattur (Ward 82 of Chennai corporation), which is a large neighbourhood in Chennai City.

== Government and politics ==
Kallikuppam is part of the Ambattur (state assembly constituency) and Sriperumbudur (Lok Sabha constituency).
