= Ivan Stedeford =

British industrialist

Sir Ivan Stedeford GBE
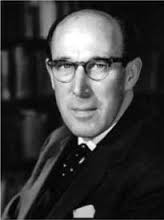
- Family photograph of Sir Ivan Stedeford
- Born: Ivan Arthur Rice Stedeford; 28 January 1897
- Died: 9 February 1975 (aged 78)

Sir Ivan Arthur Rice Stedeford GBE, (28 January 1897 – 9 February 1975) was a British industrialist and philanthropist.

Stedeford was chairman and managing director of Tube Investments (T.I.) and one of Britain's leading 20th-century industrialists.

== Education ==
Stedeford was the son of the Reverend Charles Stedeford, who served as President of the United Methodist Conference in 1928.

Stedeford began his education at Shebbear College in North Devon. The family frequently moved as Charles Stedeford's ministry took him to different parts of the country and Stedeford finished his education at the King Edward VI Aston in Birmingham.

== Early career ==
Stedeford left school in 1913 to become an engineering apprentice at Wolseley Motors Ltd.

In 1917, he decided to play a more active role in the First World War and was commissioned in the Royal Naval Air Service, tasked as a balloon forward air observer, a somewhat static and highly dangerous assignment, even by the standards of other First World War military duties.

At the end of the war, he returned to Birmingham and went into partnership to form a motor dealership called Reeve and Stedeford. It had premises in Broad Street, which was then the main route to Edgbaston, where the wealthiest citizens had their homes. It specialised in limousines and sports cars, rapidly becoming successful.

== Industrialist ==
In 1928, Stedeford was persuaded to join Tubes Ltd, the precursor of the small Midlands company Tube Investments Ltd, as sales director. His progress in T.I. was rapid. In three years he became joint managing director of Tubes Ltd., and two years later (1933) was elected to the T.I. board. He was elected Group managing director of T.I. in 1935 and in 1944 added the Chairmanship. He held the combined posts for the next 19 years, during which time T.I. developed from a small local engineering company into one of the biggest companies in the world.

He was invited to sit on the boards of the National Provincial Bank (subsequently National Westminster Bank), as Deputy chairman; the Atlas Assurance Company; the Rank Organisation; and the District Bank.

During his time running T.I., the company diversified from its reliance on steel tubes into the manufacture of bicycles (Raleigh), domestic products and appliances, aluminium products, precision engineering equipment, motor control equipment and electrical switchgear (Simplex-GE), gas cookers and water heaters, among many other products.

One interesting but short-lived operation was the development of the Swallow Doretti sports car. Only about 275 vehicles were made before complaints were received from T.I. clients in the car manufacturing business. Although it was a superior product to its competition, T.I. felt it might be politic not to aggravate some of the larger clients of its steel and aluminium business. Despite recognising the Doretti's qualities, Stedeford showed his legendary toughness and shut the operation down, transferring the employees to other parts of the T.I. group.

Internationally, operations were started in Asia, the Americas and Europe. One of these, TI of India Ltd – a joint venture with the Murugappa Group – led to a highly successful partnership and to one of the largest industrial groups in India.

He donated around £5,000 as a contribution to build a hospital to serve the people, and it is named as Sir Ivan Stedeford Hospital in his honour. He inaugurated the hospital in 1966, now it is a major hospital serving the Ambattur region near Madras now called as Chennai in southern India, The Sir Ivan Stedeford Hospital, was a direct result of this close partnership.

In 1954, he was created a Knight Commander of the Order of the British Empire (KBE).

== The Aluminium War ==
By 1958, Tube Investments had become a huge company with interests worldwide – in 1960 it had profits of £27 million. In 1958 Stedeford conducted the first hostile takeover of a public company in the United Kingdom, in the Aluminium War, when Tube Investments, allied with Reynolds Metals of the United States and advised by Siegmund George Warburg, won the battle for British Aluminium, headed by Lord Portal.

Ranged against Stedeford were the vast majority of the blue chip investment houses of the City of London. The battle for British Aluminium was won in the end by Tube Investments/Reynolds Metals' superior bid; the totally inept way Portal and his backers (Hambros Bank and Cazenove among nearly 30 others) handled the press, and Portal's high-handedness with his own investors (secretly trying to sell British Aluminium at a fraction of the price Stedeford had offered), made this a defining moment in the City's history.

At one critical meeting between T.I. and British Aluminium late on a Friday, Portal stood up and declared, "My bankers will take over from here". Stedeford shot back, "If you leave, Lord Portal, I leave!" Portal sat back down. On another occasion, while rebuffing the T.I. bid, Portal bizarrely referred to "people unaware of the mysteries of negotiations between great companies..."

Harold Macmillan's Government was encouraged to become involved on British Aluminium's side (he knew both Portal and Stedeford well), but declined, realising that change was needed and that any intervention on the side of British Aluminium would be politically disastrous, in light of Portal's total disregard of his investors' best interests.

The Aluminium War rewrote the way the City conducted its business in relation to shareholders and investors, resulting in a more open and competitive landscape. It was the first stage in a process that led to the Big Bang reform of 1986, allowing the City to dominate the international finance markets.

== Public service ==
He was a Governor of the BBC, having been a member of the Beveridge Committee on its structure. He was also a member of the board of the UK Atomic Energy Authority. He was on the council of the Department of Scientific Research and a member of the board of the Commonwealth Development Finance Company.

He was invited in 1960 by the Prime Minister, Harold Macmillan, to become the Chairman of an Advisory Group on the state of British transport, which became known as the Stedeford Committee. Also on the Committee was Dr Richard Beeching, and the two men clashed on a number of issues connected with Beeching's proposals to reduce drastically the rail infrastructure of Great Britain. In spite of questions being asked in Parliament, Sir Ivan's report was not published at the time. A set of proposals for the future of the railways that came to be known as the "Beeching Plan" (more usually known as the "Beeching Cuts" or "Beeching Axe") was adopted by the Government, resulting in the closure of a third of the rail network and the scrapping of a third of a million freight wagons, much as Stedeford had foreseen and fought against.

Stedeford's knighthood was advanced to Knight Grand Cross (GBE) in 1961 for public service.

== Character ==
Sir Ivan was described in his 1975 Times obituary as an energetic individual with an interest in scholarly discussion and debate.

Though he always looked upon the welfare of all employees as a major charge there was no paternalism in his attitude. He expected every employee to make his or her own effort. When this was done, they were given every encouragement to develop to the full extent of their ability. This encouragement took the form of many schemes sponsored by him, such as comprehensive training up to free university for the outstandingly talented. T.I.'s residential training centre was the first of its kind in the country. He also sponsored pensions and free life assurance for all employees, at a time when such benefits were rare." (The Times obituary – 11 February 1975)

== Retirement ==
He retired from active management of T.I. in 1963, assuming the title of Life President, having run the company for over 25 years, and having built it into a global industrial powerhouse.

Stedeford married Gwendoline Aston in 1923, and they had three daughters. He enjoyed country pursuits, especially fox hunting. He was an Honorable Kentucky Colonel.

He died near Stratford-upon-Avon, aged 78.

Post Script

Sir Ivan was the architect of the sale of Hercules Cycle and Motor Company Ltd to TI in the forties. He was a close neighbour of Sir Edmund Crane at Lapworth and it is said that the deal was done over the garden fence! Sir Edmund later claimed his company had been 'given away'.

Hercules information is on www.madeinbirmingham.org
