= Ayappakkam =

Ayapakkam
- Neighbourhood
- Ayapakkam(Chennai) Ayapakkam (Tamil Nadu) Ayapakkam (India)
- Coordinates: 13°06′16″N 80°07′58″E
- Country: India
- State: Tamil Nadu
- District: Thiruvallur
- Taluka: Avadi taluk
- Metro: Chennai

Population (2011)
  - Total: 28,630
- Demonym: Chennaities

Languages
  - Official: Tamil
- Time zone: UTC+5:30 (IST)
- PIN: 600 077
- Telephone code: 91-044
- Vehicle registration: TN 12 (RTO, Poonamallee)
- Parliamentary constituency: Sriperumbudur
- Assembly constituency: Maduravoyal (state assembly constituency)
- Planning agency: CMDA

Ayappakkam is a Western suburb of Chennai in Thiruvallur district in the Indian state of Tamil Nadu. Ayapakkam is currently a village panchayat surrounded by Thiruverkadu municipality, Avadi corporation and Greater Chennai Corporations.

== Location ==
Situated between Ambattur Industrial Estate, Avadi and Thiruverkadu, Ayappakkam developed as a residential area from 1990, after Tamil Nadu Housing Board quarters came up. Unlike Ambattur (houses more industrial units), Ayappakkam is predominantly a residential area and it connects with the city, via Anna Nagar, Mogappair, Nolambur, Athipet and Maduravoyal, through Poonamallee High Road, Chennai-Tiruvallur High (CTH) Road and Ambattur Industrial Estate Road.There is a famous temple named sri panchanmuga anjaneyar temple in ayappa nagar of ayappakkam.

== Demographics ==
=== Population ===
In the 2011 census, Ayappakkam had a population of 28,630.

== Important Landmarks ==
A branch of the ICMR (Indian Council Of Medical Research) is located here. Adjacent to it is a branch of the NCB (Narcotics Control Bureau) of India.

== Transport ==
=== Railways ===
Annanur railway station is connected with the northern part of Ayapakkam. There are suburban trains that cross this station which travel between Chennai Central, Chennai Beach, Arakonam, Thiruvallur, Tiruthani and Velachery. Some trains that originate from Avadi have an EMU Shed, which handles the majority of the suburban train operations on the Northern and Western line.

=== Roadways ===
==== Chennai–Tiruttani highway ====
It is about 1.5 km from Dunlop - Ambattur Police station junction via Chennai–Thiruvallur High Road, which is accessible from EVR Periyar Salai via Vanagaram - Ambattur, Athipet Road.

Chennai Bypass is located about 3 km from Ayapakkam and can be reached via Athipet Ambattur.

==== MTC Bus Terminus ====
A small number of buses run from Ayapakkam. It connects it to Chennai Mofussil Bus Terminus (Koyambedu), Thiruverkadu and Ambattur Industrial Estate nearby.

== Recreation ==
Camp Tonakela Association, formed in the year 1938, is located in South end of Thirumulaivoyal, North of Ayapakkam.

Paruthipattu Lake, which has been restored as eco-park and opened to public on 21 June 2019, is nearby.

In addition, Maharaja Royal Club at the adjacent area Ayanambakkam, which is a paid recreation facility which has sports courts and swimming pools.
