= Sir Ramaswami Mudaliar Higher Secondary School =

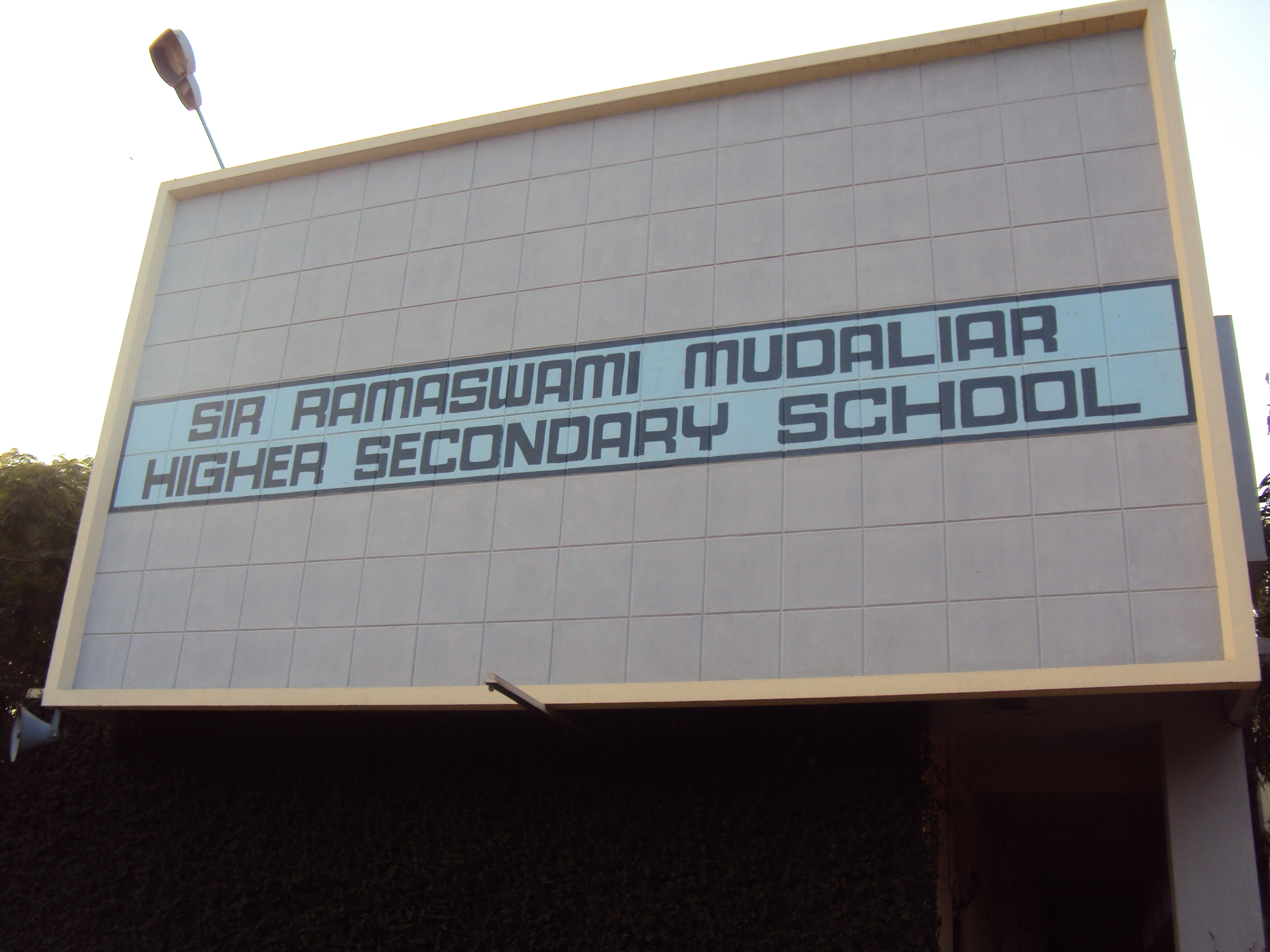

Location
- Ambattur, Chennai, Tamil Nadu; India; 13.1168°N 80.1493°E

Information
- Type: State secondary
- Motto: Strive and Thrive
- Established: 1958
- Founder: AMM Foundation
- School district: Chennai (North)
- Educational authority: Chief Educational Officer, Chennai; District Educational Officer, Chennai (North)
- School code: 33010907103 [UDISE code]
- Headmaster: Vijayakumar. S
- Grades: Sixth to twelfth
- Gender: Co-education
- Education system: Tamil Nadu State Board

Sir Ramaswami Mudaliar Higher Secondary School is a government-aided higher secondary school in Ambattur. This school was established to preserve the memory of Sir Arcot Ramaswami Mudaliar, who was closely associated with the birth and growth of Tube Investments of India as its founder, chairman and later as the first president of the company. Hence the first school of the AMM Charities Trust started in 1958 was named after him. The initial infrastructure of the school was created at a cost of Rs. 60 lakhs on a 13-acre plot in Ambattur. The school was later upgraded into a co-educational higher secondary school in 1978. Today the school has a strength of about 1,879 pupils (as of June 2023) including 87 qualified teachers and other staff members. If offers education through Tamil and English mediums.

== History ==
=== Initial seeds ===
The primary school, started by Natesa Iyer, Deivasigamani Mudaliar and Muthukrishna Iyer in Venkatapuram, Ambattur may be regarded as the nucleus of the present school.

== Chief minister's visit ==
The construction of the permanent buildings for the high school was entrusted to M/s.Coromondal Engineering Company - pioneers in building construction - and this was completed by K. Kamaraj, C Subramaniam and Sir Ramaswami Mudaliar June 1960 in a record time.

The management took a progressive step by introducing English medium in one section of each standard. Bifurcated courses of study with secretarial and engineering sections were also introduced in order to give equal importance to vocational education and training.

The school was named a Higher Secondary school on 12 July 1978.

The school now has a big, renovated auditorium where 3000 students can gather at a time.

== Golden Jubilee Celebration ==
The school celebrated its golden jubilee in October 2008; the chief guest for the occasion was A. P. J. Abdul Kalam.

== Library and laboratories ==
The school has a large library with a collection of nearly 12,000 books with open access system to students. The school has separate laboratories for physics, chemistry, botany and zoology. It has a junior laboratory too, for high school and middle school students. The school has a computer lab, a junior computer lab and a multimedia library with Internet facility.

== Governing authority ==
The school comes under the control of Chennai (North) Chief Educational Officer and as far as Revenue department is concerned, Ambattur falls under the Chennai district; the sanctioning of leave in times of disaster, heavy rain or cyclone etc. comes under the authority of the Chennai district collector.

== Playground ==
The school has a 5-acre playground with a 200-metre track, courts for basketball, ball badminton, volleyball, tennikoit, throwball and khokho.

== Management ==
- M.A.Algappan, Managing Trustee—AMM Foundation

=== Managing Committee ===
- A.A. Alagammai, Chairperson
- H. Narayanan, Senior Associate Vice President & Chief Executive—AMM Foundation
- S. Sundar, Correspondent & Secretary
- R. Kamakshi, Advisor - Schools
- S. Vijayakumar, Headmaster

=== 2021-2022 ===
The school is one of the top schools in the government-aided schools category, as is evidenced by this year's Tenth Standard performance; some statistics:

- Highest Mark— 458 (English Medium)
- Pass percentage—91%

== Achievements in sport ==
An old student of the school, R. Mohan Kumar will be representing the Indian athletics 4 × 400 m relay team in the 2016 Summer Olympics in Rio de Janeiro. He is the fifth member of the relay team.

== Co-curricular and extra curricular activities ==
The school has many clubs and other programs for the co-curricular and the extra-curricular activities of the children. Foremost among them are the NCC, NSS, Film club, Nature club, Little Drops.

=== Film Club ===
The school has a new club called the SRM Film Club (குறும்பட மன்றம்) inaugurated by the AMMF Managing Trustee. Short films carrying important values are shown to the club members after which they discuss and interact freely; this may lead to the imbibing of certain values in the young minds.

== Education Minister's Visit ==
The incumbent Minister for School Education Anbil Mahesh Poyyamozhi visited the school on the reopening day of the academic year (12-Jun-2023) and inspected the various functions of the school.
