= Koyambedu =

Neighborhood of Chennai, India

Koyembedu
- Neighbourhood
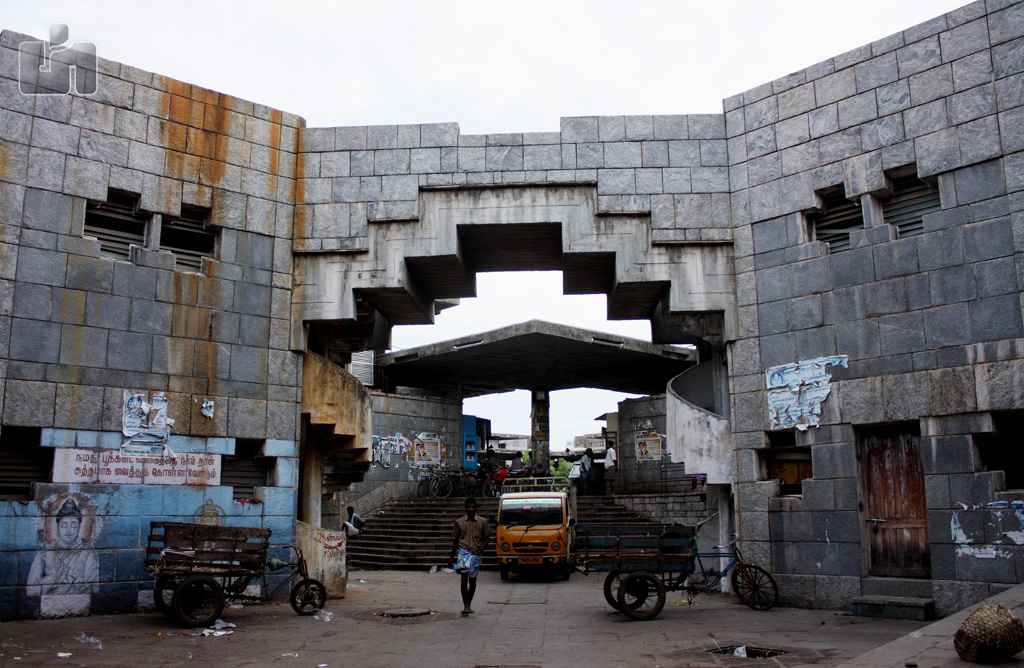
- Entrance of Koyambedu Market

- Koyambedu (Chennai) Koyembedu (Tamil Nadu) Koyembedu (India)
- Coordinates: 13.0694°N 80.1948°E
- Country: India
- State: Tamil Nadu
- District: Chennai
- Metro: Chennai

Government
  - Body: CMDA
- Elevation: 31.8 m (104 ft)

Languages
  - Official: Tamil
- Time zone: UTC+5:30 (IST)
- PIN: 600107
- Vehicle registration: TN-02
- Planning agency: CMDA

Koyambedu is a neighbourhood in Chennai, India. Situated in the western part of Chennai city, the Koyambedu area has become a major hub of activity in Chennai after the inauguration of the Koyambedu market in 1996 and the Chennai Mofussil Bus Terminus (CMBT) in 2002. The area is active round the clock owing to the movement of people and goods through the day, with uninterrupted transport facilities such as long-route buses, autos, share autos, vegetable goods carriers and so forth.

== Etymology ==
The name of the neighbourhood comes from ko meaning horse, ambu meaning arrow, and pedu meaning fence, when Lava and Kusha caught the horse sent by Rama in a fence made of arrows.

== Access ==
Koyambedu is connected to both the Chennai Central Railway Station in Park Town and the Chennai International Airport in Tirusulam. The Poonamallee High Road (NH4) connects Koyambedu to the Chennai Central Railway Station, while the Jawaharlal Nehru Road (also known as Inner Ring Road or 100 feet (30 m) road connects Koyambedu to Chennai Airport.

Recently, property prices have shot up in and around Koyambedu. Koyambedu is surrounded by localities like Vadapalani, Anna Nagar, Arumbakkam, CMDA (of Arumbakkam), Aminjikarai, Virugambakkam and Nerkundram.

== Places of worship ==
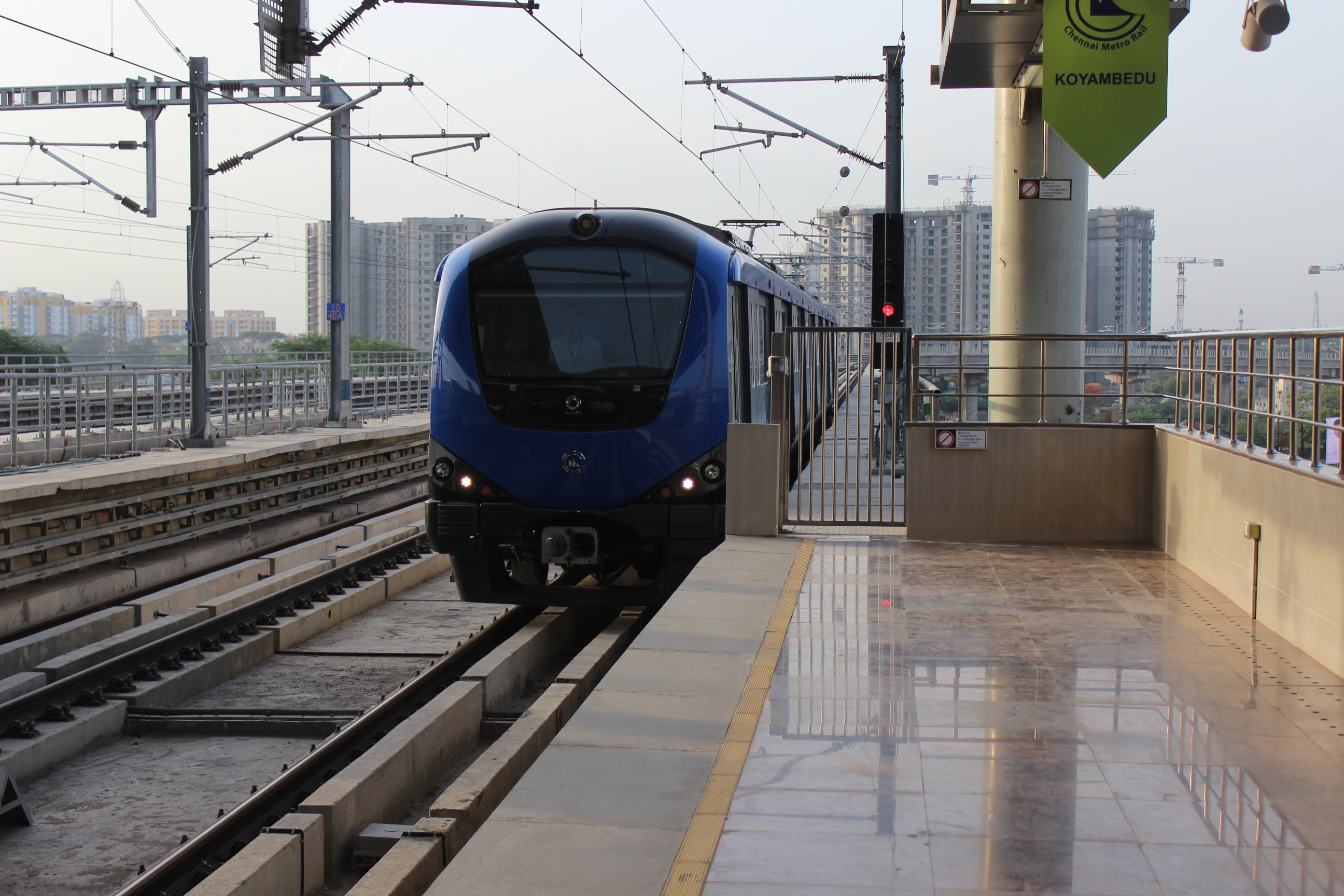
Chennai Metro Rail at Koyambedu

Major temples in the neighbourhood include Kurungaleeswarar Temple, Sri Vaigundavaasa Perumal Temple, Sri Vinayagar Temple, and Sri Saemathamman Temple.

== Koyambedu Wholesale Market Complex (KWMC) ==
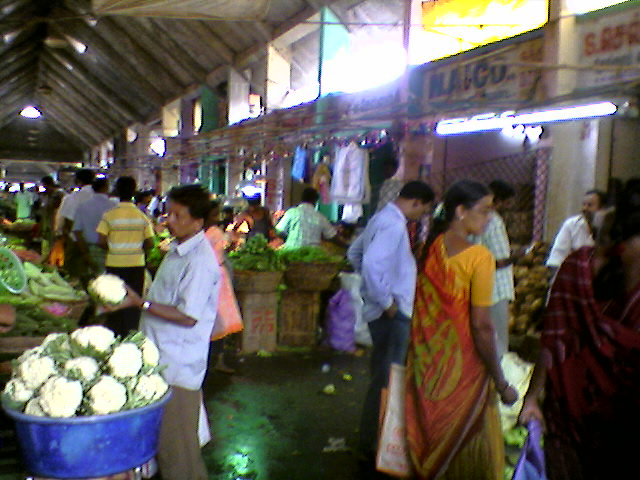
A view of the Koyambedu Market

Koyambedu Wholesale Market Complex (KWMC), popularly known as the Koyambedu Market, is a wholesale fruit and vegetable market. It was established in 1996, when the city's principal wholesale fruit and vegetable market in Kothawal Chavadi had to be closed. The market is one of the largest of its kind in Asia.

In 2013, construction of an exclusive foodgrains market, the first such facility in the state, began at the market complex at a cost of ₹ 690.7 million. Constructed in an area of 14.41 acres, next to the existing wholesale vegetable market, it was to be opened by mid-2014.

== Koyambedu Roundtana ==
Koyambedu Junction, otherwise known as the Koyambedu Roundabout, is an important road junction in Chennai. It is located north of the Chennai Mofussil Bus Terminus at the junction of the Inner Ring Road and the NH4. The junction is a part of the Golden Quadrilateral project taken up under the National Highways Development Project.

== Sewage treatment plants ==
There are two sewage treatment plants at Koyambedu and they jointly have the capacity to treat 94 million litres a day (mld) of sewage generated in localities such as T. Nagar, Kodambakkam, Anna Nagar, Virugambakkam and Mogappair. The sewage treatment capacity of the city is set to be enhanced with Chennai Metrowater preparing to float tenders for construction of another plant to treat 20 mld at Koyambedu. The new plant will facilitate treating of more sewage - generated in the neighboring suburbs. The ₹1,160-million project, which was sanctioned under Jawaharlal Nehru National Urban Renewal Mission, will come up at a 25-acre site in the existing facility at Koyambedu. The new plant will take in the additional volume from suburbs such as Maduravoyal, Ambattur, Nerkundram and Nolambur that are being provided with sewerage network. Unlike the existing facilities, the infrastructure to generate electricity from sewage will be provided during the construction of the plant. The project will be commissioned in two years. This will add to the existing nine facilities having a capacity of 486 mld in Kodungaiyur and Nesapakkam. The two upcoming STPs will have a treatment capacity of 114 mld.

== Chennai Mofussil Bus Terminus or CMBT ==
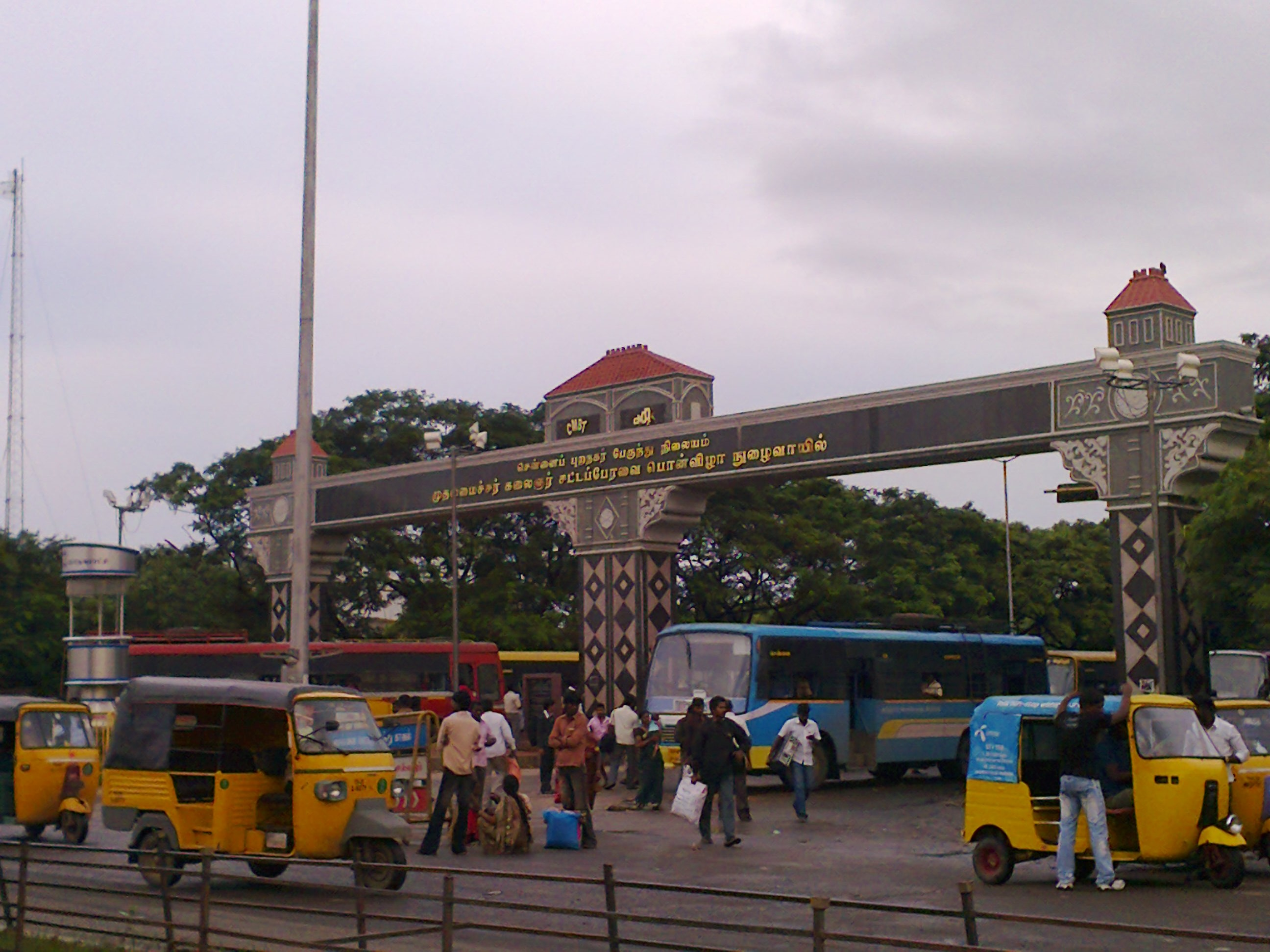
CMBT

Spread over an area of 37 acre in Koyambedu is the largest bus terminus in Asia and is accredited with the ISO 9001:2000 quality certification.

Mofussil stands for service throughout the Tamil Nadu state and also the neighboring states of Andhra Pradesh, Karnataka, Kerala and Pondicherry. This station is also abbreviated as 'CMBT' and now it is renamed as 'Puratchi Thalaivar Dr. MGR Bus Terminus'.

It can simultaneously station 270 buses and handle over 2,000 buses and 200,000 passengers a day. The 36.5 acres (0.148 km^{2}) bus terminus has an 18,000 sq ft (1,700 m^{2}) waiting facility for passengers, a 25,000 sq ft (2,300 m^{2}) parking space for auto rickshaws, cabs & private cars and a 16,000 sq ft (1,500 m^{2}) parking space for two-wheelers.

== Chennai Contract Carriage Bus Terminus or CCCBT ==
Koyambedu has another bus terminus, for private-owned (Omni) buses which operate throughout Tamil Nadu and the neighboring states. The CCCBT bus terminus is close to CMBT. It has over 80 bus bays and 100 idle parking spaces - catering to around 200 buses per day.

== SAF Games Village ==
The South Asian Federation (SAF) Games Village at Koyambedu is a large residential complex with 760 flats. Of these, some flats come under the Government rental scheme and the others belong to individuals and institutions including Indian Oil, the Reserve Bank of India, the Punjab National Bank, Union Bank of India, Annapurna, Food Corporation of India, Canara Bank and the State Bank of India.

It was built by the Government of Tamil Nadu to provide accommodation during the seventh South Asian Federation Games (or SAF Games) event held in Chennai (then Madras) in 1995 to the sportspersons who participated in it. Later, the flats were taken over by Government institutions under various projects of the Tamil Nadu Government and promoted as a large residential complex.

Approximately 100 officers belonging to the IAS, IPS, IFS, IRS, IA&AS, IPoS, etc. reside here. The dwelling units coming under the control of organizations such as the RBI, Indianoil and SBI, Income tax and central excise departments present a pretty picture. The infrastructure development in the area led to a sharp increase in commercial and residential land values, with property prices along major arterial corridors rising upwards of ₹1.5 crores per ground by the 2010s. South Asian Federation (SAF) Games Village is famous for its greenery, even though it is close to the Chennai Mofussil Bus Terminus. It has beautiful parks, which form an ideal place for kids to enjoy and for morning walkers and joggers.

== Landmarks ==
- Koyambedu Roundtana.
- Chennai Mofussil Bus Terminus (CMBT), the largest bus terminus in Asia.
- Chennai Contract Carriage Bus Terminus (CCCBT), a separate bus terminus for private-owned (Omni) buses.
- St. Thomas College, Koyambedu.
- Arihant Majestic Towers, a multi storey residential complex.
- The Koyambedu market, the largest market in Asia.
- SAF Games Village, a large residential complex with several apartments.
- Rohini Silver Screen, one of the famous and best cinema theatre with iconic landmark in Chennai
