= Ambattur =

Neighbourhood in Chennai district, Tamil Nadu, India

- Suburb of Chennai
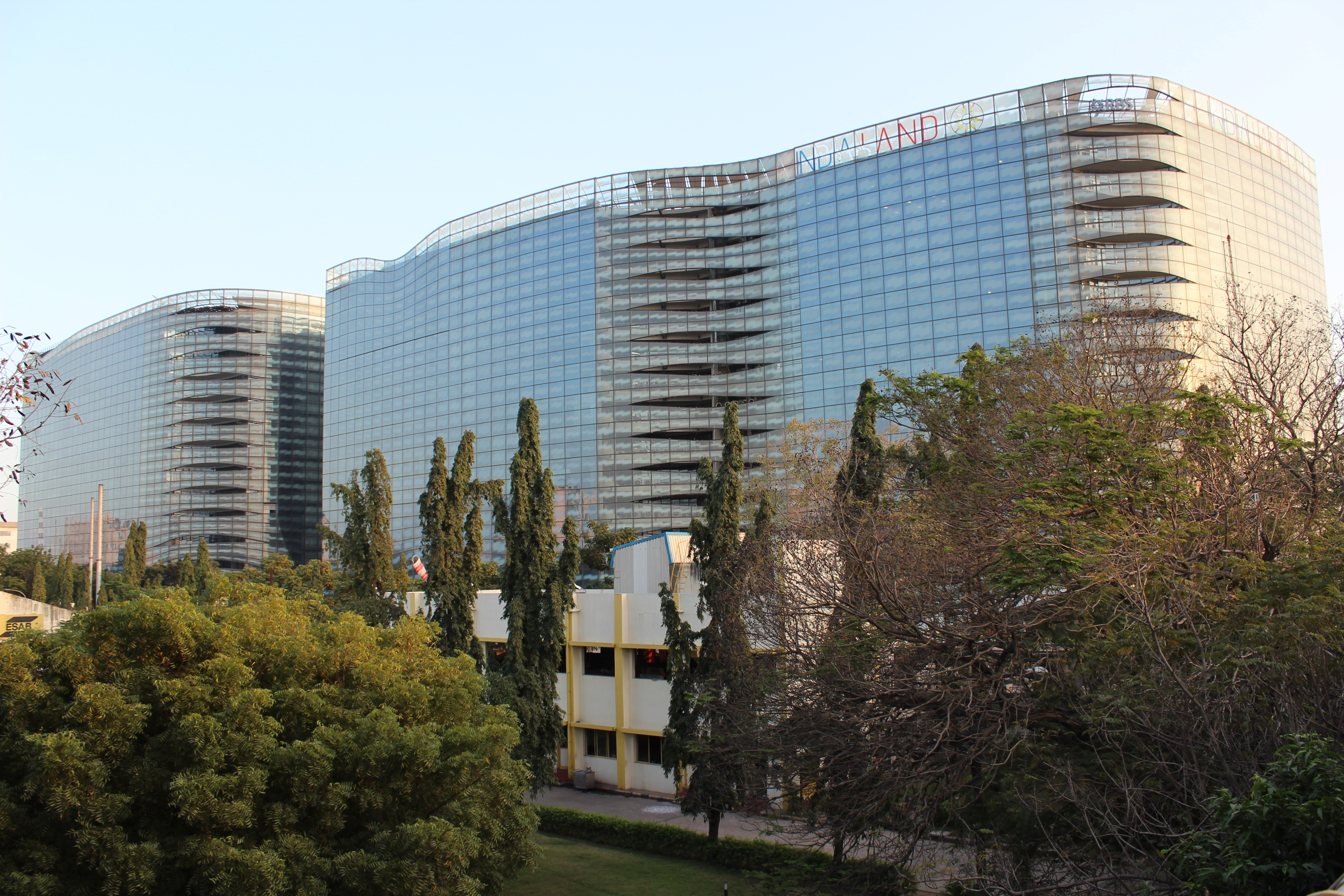
- One Indiabulls IT Park, Ambattur
- Interactive map of Ambattur
- Ambattur (Chennai)
- Coordinates: 13.114300°N 80.154800°E
- Country: India
- State: Tamil Nadu
- District: Chennai District
- Metro: Chennai
- Zone: Central Chennai
- Ward: 79-93

Government
  - Body: Greater Chennai Corporation

Area
  - Total: 40.36 km^{2} (15.58 sq mi)
- Elevation: 44 m (144 ft)

Population (2011)
  - Total: 478,134
  - Rank: 96th
  - Density: 11,551/km^{2} (29,920/sq mi)

Languages
  - Official: Tamil
- Time zone: UTC+5:30 (IST)
- PIN: 600053, 600058, 600062, 600098
- Vehicle registration: TN 13 (RTO, Ambattur)
- Railway station code: ABU
- MP: T.R. Baalu, DMK
- MLA: G. Balamurugan, TVK
- Parliamentary constituency: Sriperumbudur
- Assembly constituency: Ambattur
- Planning agency: CMDA

Ambattur is a northwestern part of Chennai, India. It is located in Ambattur taluk of the Chennai District, surrounded by Avadi, Anna Nagar, Korattur, Padi, Mogappair, Kallikuppam, Surapet, Ayappakkam, Athipet and Thiruverkadu. It covers an area of 40.36 km^{2} (15.58 sq mi). The suburb is served by Ambattur railway station. Ambattur was once a village with large extents of farmlands irrigated by Ambattur Lake. Today, the area is a bustling urban hub engaged with industrial and commercial activity.

== Etymology ==
This place is one of 108 Shakthi Sthals in the country. The Amman temple (for the Hindu deity Durga) here is the fifty-first in the order, giving the locality the Tamil name "aimbaththu onraam oor" (ஐம்பத்து ஒன்றாம் ஊர்), meaning fifty-first place/temple village, which later transmuted as Ambattur. The goddess is worshiped in the form of Vaishnavi.

Ambattur is also called so because it was a collaboration of 51 small towns (ambathu onraam oor in Tamil), from which the name Ambattur was derived.

== History ==
Along with Avadi, Sembium, Ennore and Tiruvottriyur, Ambattur is part of the "auto belt" in the city's industrial north and west regions that developed when the automobile industry developed in Madras, in the early post-World War II years. Sir Ivan Stedeford, chairman of Tube Investments, United Kingdom, was instrumental in starting the TI factory and TII complex in the country. Sir Ivan signed a joint venture agreement with A. M. Murugappa Chettiar of the Murugappa Group. It was the first joint venture agreement to be signed in South India post-independence. This resulted in the establishment of the TI Cycles of India factory in Ambattur in 1951, and manufacture of bicycles under 'Hercules India' brand began.

In 1954, Sir Ivan signed his second JV, Tube Products India, with the Murugappa family. The factory was established on what had been the British Government of Malaya's Immigration Camp. By 1956, production was started in the new factory and soon resulted in scaling-up of other TI factories in the Ambattur-Avadi industrial stretch. This led to the rapid growth of population in the region. Several public amenities were established in Ambattur by TI company, such as the Sir Ramaswami Mudaliar Higher Secondary School, a post office and a bank. The company also established a hospital between Ambattur and Avadi in 1966, from a gift of around £5,000 from Sir Ivan. The hospital was named the Sir Ivan Stedeford Hospital in his honour.

== Geography ==
=== Waterbodies, Flora and Fauna ===
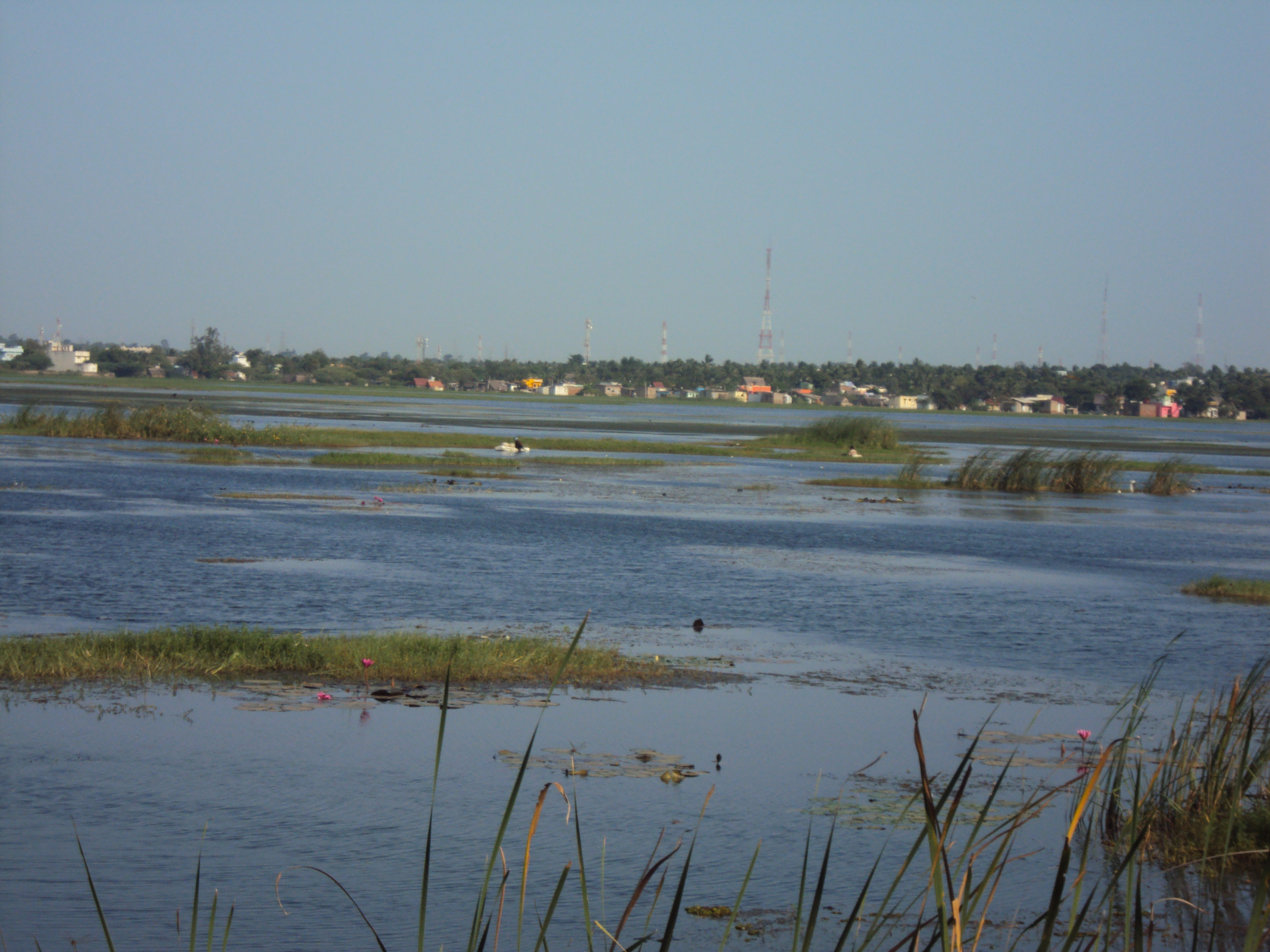
A section of the Ambattur Lake

Ambattur has two main waterbodies, namely the Ambattur Lake, Korattur Lake and the bigger Puzhal Eri on the outskirts. The upkeep of the Ambattur Lake is plagued by problems such as dumping of garbage, water mining and construction of buildings. The local body generates nearly 250 tonnes of garbage daily.

Several species of birds reside and frequent the places in and around Ambattur Lake. Woodland birds, water birds and many more visit here.

Ambattur has a stormwater drain network of 177.95 km, the largest of the eight zones newly added to the Corporation of Chennai in 2011.

== Demographics ==
Religious census
Religion	Percent(%)
Hindu	86.53%
Muslim	3.68%
Christian	8.95%
Sikh	0.05%
Buddhist	0.04%
Jain	0.17%
Other	0.57%
No religion	0.01%

Historical population
Year	Pop.	±%
1971	45,586	—
1981	115,901	+154.2%
1991	215,424	+85.9%
2001	310,967	+44.4%
2011	466,205	+49.9%

According to the 2011 census, Ambattur had a population of 466,205 with a sex-ratio of 985 females for every 1,000 males, much above the national average of 929. A total of 48,444 were under the age of six, constituting 24,829 males and 23,615 females. Scheduled Castes and Scheduled Tribes accounted for 11.49% and 0.33% of the population, respectively. The average literacy of the town was 82.61%, compared with the national average of 72.99%. The town had 120,248 households. There were 184,390 workers, comprising 1,252 cultivators, 1,128 main agricultural labourers, 2,467 in house hold industries, 159,242 other workers, 20,301 marginal workers, 507 marginal cultivators, 453 marginal agricultural labourers, 641 marginal workers in household industries and 18,700 other marginal workers. As per the religious census of 2011, Ambattur had 86.53% Hindus, 3.68% Muslims, 8.95% Christians, 0.05% Sikhs, 0.04% Buddhists, 0.17% Jains, 0.57% following other religions and 0.01% following no religion or did not indicate any religious preference.

During 2001–2011, Ambattur registered a population growth of 49.9%.

== Administration ==
Ambattur comes under the Sriperumbudur Parliamentary constituency. It was previously under the North Chennai parliamentary constituency, and, along with Villivakkam, it was the largest assembly constituency in India. The 2008 delimitation carved out Ambattur as a separate constituency. Once a major panchayat, Ambattur was made a township in the 1960s and a selection-grade municipality from April 1975-1992, a special-grade municipality from 1992-2011. Ambattur Municipality included Padi, Korattur, Mogappair, Kallikuppam, Nolambur, Ayapakkam TNHB, Athipet, Udayarpalayam and the Ambattur Industrial Estate areas and had 52 wards.

On 15 June 2011, the Chief Minister of Tamil Nadu submitted a memorandum to the Prime Minister of India to expand the city limits of Chennai by which the Ambattur Municipality would come under the new scheme. Since October 2011, the municipality was merged with Greater Chennai Corporation as Zone 7 with 15 wards (Ward Nos. 79 to 91, 93).

== Economy ==
=== Ambattur Industrial Estate ===
The Ambattur Industrial Estate, spread over an area of 1,430 acres (4.9 km^{2}), houses about 1,800 units and is the biggest small scale industrial estate in South Asia. It was commissioned in the year 1964 by the Government of Tamil Nadu. Companies like Britannia Industries, TI Cycles of India, Dunlop, and TVS have their plants in Ambattur. Tata Communications has its satellite earth station at the Ambattur–Red Hills road. Ambattur Estate was well known as an auto ancillary hub. The Heavy Vehicles Factory (HVF) in Avadi, manufacturer of defence, military tanks, is just 5 km from this place, adding to its importance. A railway concrete sleeper manufacturing company is located near the Ambattur railway station. Textile industries such as Ambattur Clothing Limited (ACL) and Bombay Fashions have their facilities here and employ thousands of women. The units in the Industrial Estate generate a combined annual revenue of over ₹ 35,000 million.

=== IT parks and Data centres ===
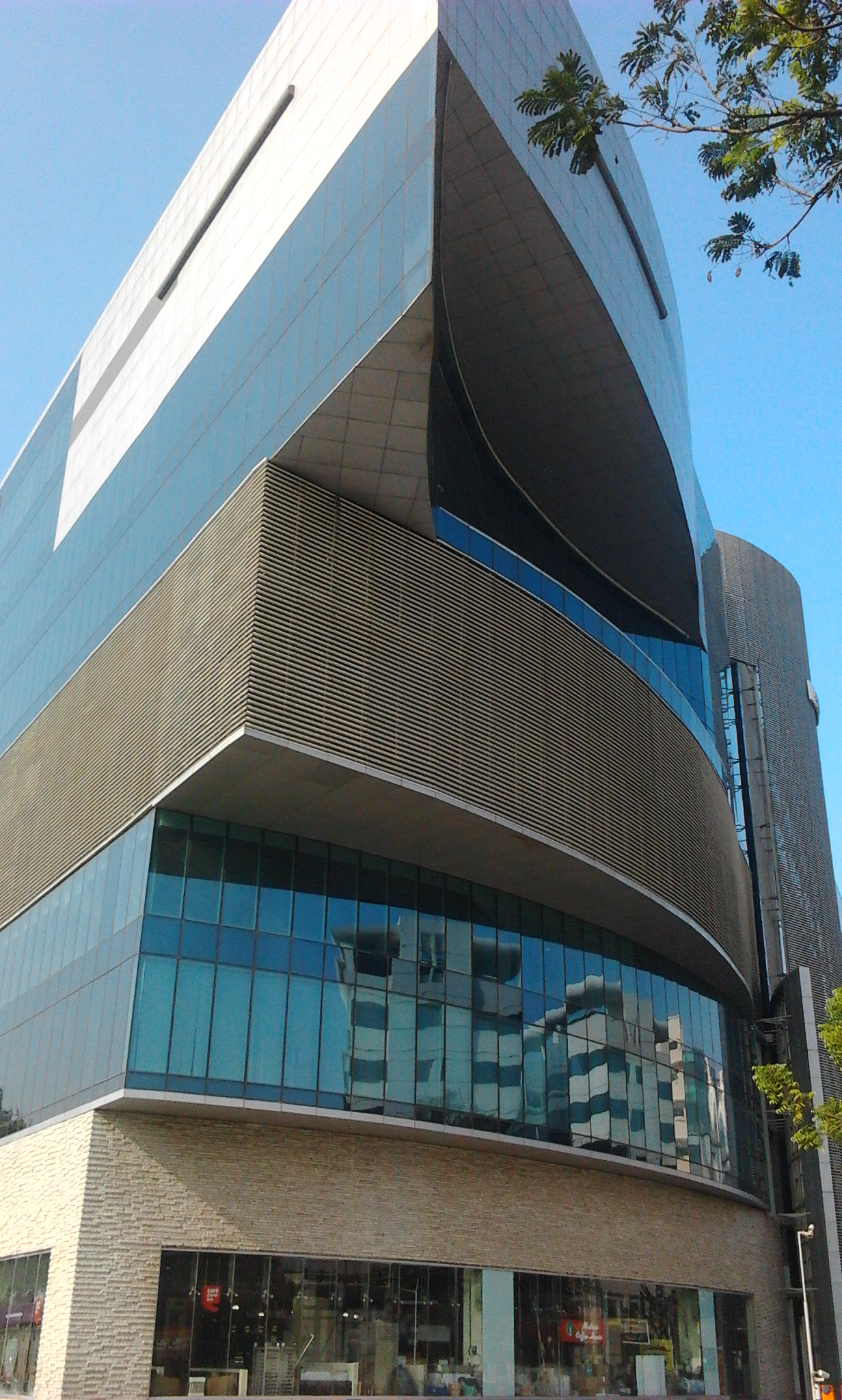
The Ambit IT Park with CMA CGM, iOpex Technologies and Movate Formerly CSS Corp

In the late 2000s, Ambattur Industrial Estate has attracted a lot of IT companies due to its proximity to residential neighborhoods and the lower rentals. The lease rentals of IT Parks in Ambattur are half of those in the city. Information Technology (IT) companies such as MilesTs, HCL Technologies, Dell and Tata Consultancy Services have their development centers here. Out of the 22 facilities that HCL Technologies has in Chennai, six are in Ambattur. There are also a few BPO centres such as Perot Systems, Telebuy, Polaris BPO, Serco, First Source & iOPEX Technologies. Prince Info Park, Kochar Technology Park, Ambit IT Park. Chennai Tech Park, a 2,400,000 sq ft (220,000 m^{2}), state-of-the-art, futuristic IT park, on 10 acres (40,000 m^{2}) of land is commissioned since 2009 by IndiaLand Park. Now that 10 acres commercial building is bought by Indiabulls Securities Ltd for Rs 600 crores and renamed it as One IndiaBulls Park, current occupiers of the complex include Royal Bank of Scotland, Kone, Britannia Industries, Ajuba, Covenant, Telebuy, Ibox, Bean Balls, Germany's Modisch, Yes Bank and Etisalat. One IndiaBulls park is one of the major IT parks in Ambattur. As a remarkable mile stone, CMA CGM, world's 3rd largest liner started their documentation center along with Regional eCommerce Team in AMBIT park.

While IT and ITeS firms in Ambattur have brought in a new image to the industrial belt that has been known for its garment and auto-ancillary units, it has increased the real estate prices.

== Transport ==
=== Road ===
The Chennai-Tiruvallur High Road (CTH Road or NH 716) passes through Ambattur and the Chennai-Kolkata highway is just about 8 km Puzhal from the place making it a strategic location. On an average, about 40,000 passenger car units use the CTH Road. The new Chennai Bypass road between Maduravoyal and Puzhal passes through Ambattur Industrial Estate. It connects NH4 with NH5 and NH716 via Ambattur Industrial Estate.

On 4 October 2013, the Tamil Nadu Highways department issued a GO extending the entire stretch of CTH road till Tirutani to 6 lanes at a cost of ₹ 1,680 million, by means of land acquisition from 12 villages. In the first phase, the road will be widened to 100 ft (4 lanes) with centre median at a cost of ₹ 980 million.

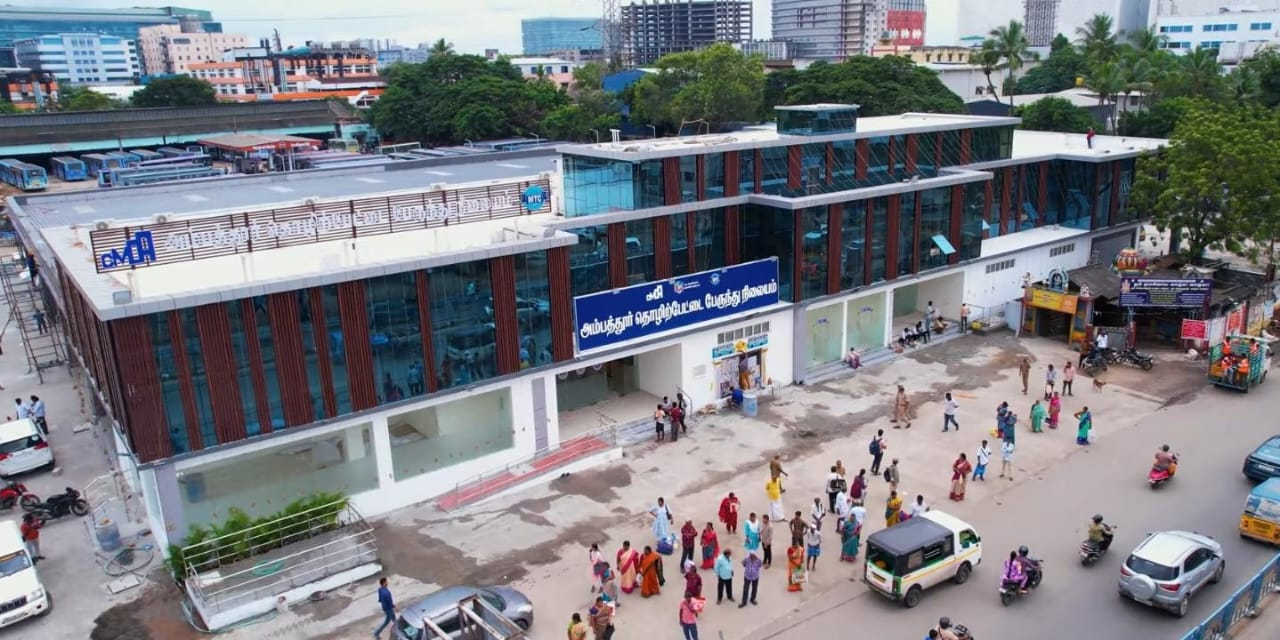
Aerial view of renovated Ambattur Estate Bus stand in 2025

The Ambattur Industrial Estate Bus Terminus, located adjacent to the CTH Road, has Metropolitan Transport Corporation (Chennai) city buses connecting Ambattur with various parts of Chennai city. A lot of buses from Avadi and the outskirts of Chennai also pass through Ambattur, offering good connectivity. The bus terminus and its maintenance centre with a capacity of 100 buses was initially opened in 1967. The terminus has been renovated in 2024-25 by CMDA with better amenities and opened to the public on in November 2025.

=== Rail ===
The Chennai Central-Arakkonam railway line passes through Ambattur and has two railway stations in the neighbourhood. Ambattur railway station serves the residential areas and Pattaravakkam railway station serves the Ambattur Industrial Estate, kallikuppam and Karruku neighbourhood areas. Suburban Broad Gauge EMU / MEMU trains operate daily from Chennai Central and Chennai Beach to Avadi, Tiruvallur, Patabiram Military Siding, Arakkonam, Vellore, Thiruvannamalai, Tirupathi, and Tiruttani via Ambattur. By rail, Ambattur is 30 minutes from Chennai Central, 15 minutes from Perambur and 7 minutes from Villivakkam. Many fast EMU locals (suburban trains) towards Tiruvallur, Arakkonam and Tiruttani, stop at Ambattur railway station, but fast local trains towards Chennai central do not halt at Ambattur because non availability of 4th platform. The station is being renovated under Amrit Bharat Station Scheme with the construction of two-wheeler subway near railway station in progress.

=== Metro ===
The extension of Red line in Chennai Metro till Pattabiram will pass via Ambattur Estate, Ambattur railway station and Ambattur OT before heading to Pattabiram, based on the Detailed Project Report prepared by CMRL. With repeated requests from commuters and resident groups, the expansion of Chennai–Thiruvallur High Road is to be integrated with metrorail by construction of 3 road-flyovers beneath metro rail line at Ambattur Estate junction, Dunlop junction and Avadi check-post junction. The metro rail extension is approved by Government of Tamil Nadu, currently awaiting approval from Government of India, with 112 acres of land acquisition underway.

== Amenities ==
=== Library ===
The Branch Library, earlier known as Murugappa Library, was opened in May 1971 by the then Minister of Education and Local Administration V. R. Nedunchezhiyan. The library is situated near Perunthalaivar Kamarajar Government Girls Higher Secondary School (Girl's High School).

=== Schools ===
- Sir Ramaswami Mudaliar Higher Secondary School (a government-aided higher secondary school)
- Sri Sathya Sai Nursery and Primary School (Shoba Nagar, Near Sir Ivan Stedeford Hospital)
- Velammal Vidhyashram (CBSE) & Velammal NEWGEN Park (CBSE & ICSE), Surapet
- Velammal Global School – IGCSE, Surapet
- Velammal Vidhyashram – CBSE (Oragadam, Ambattur)
- Annai Violet International School (CBSE), (located in Pudur)
- Bhaktavatsalam Vidyashram (CBSE), (in Korattur)
- Sri Mahaganesa Vidhyasala, Venkatapuram
- Sri Venkateswara Matric. Hr. Sec. School (Athipet, Ambattur)
- Sri Venkateswara Vidhyalaya (Ayapakkam)
- Sethu Bhaskara Matriculation Higher Secondary School (located in Pudur)
- Ebenezer Marcus Matriculation Higher Secondary School (located in Pudur)
- Ebenezer Marcus International School (CBSE)(located in Pudur)
- St. Joseph's Matriculation Higher Secondary School
- T.I. Higher Secondary School (CBSE & Matriculation) (run by AMM Foundation)
- Perunthalaivar Kamarajar Government Girls Higher Secondary School, Venkatapuram
- T.V. Nagar matriculation High School
- Hussain Memorial Matric Higher Secondary School, Krishnapuram
- G.K. Shetty Vivekananda Vidyalaya Junior College (founded in 1979 and celebrated silver jubilee in the year 2005, affiliated to CBSE)
- Velammal Matriculation Higher Secondary School (in Surapet)
- Satheesh Balaji Matriculation Higher Secondary School (Madhanankuppam)
- Lake View Matriculation School (in Pudur)
- Emmanuel Methodist Matriculation Higher Secondary School (in Pudur)
- Divine Matriculation School and Sharon Matriculation School (in Pudur)
- Aacini Matriculation Higher Secondary School
- Sree Saraswathi Matric School, (located in Kallikuppam)
- D.A.V. (Boys) Senior Secondary School (in Anna Nagar Western Extension)
- D.A.V. (Girls) Sr. Secondary School (in Anna Nagar Western Extension)
- S.B.O.A. School & Junior College (in Anna Nagar Western Extension)
- S.B.O.A. Matriculation and Higher Secondary School (in Anna Nagar Western Extension)
- Leo Matriculation School (in Anna Nagar Western Extension)
- Chennai Public School (International Baccalaureate), in Anna Nagar Western Extension
- The Indian Public School - Chennai North campus, Pattaravakkam
- Rudrappasamy School (CBSE), Karukku (Pattaravakkam)
- St. Moses Matriculation School, Karukku (Pattaravakkam)
- Sri Ramakrishna Matriculation Mission School (located in Pudur)
- Nathella Vidyodaya (CBSE), Venkatapuram
- Pasumpon Narayana e-Techno School (CBSE), Vijayalakshmipuram
- Sri Vidhya Nikethan Matriculation school (located in Pudur)
- New Century Matriculation Higher Secondary School, ICF Colony, Ambattur
- Aachi Global School, Ayanambakkam
- Birla Open Minds International School, Athipet, Mogappair West End
- St Joseph Nursery and primary school Ambattur
- St Joseph Matriculation Higher secondary school Ambattur

=== Colleges ===
- Annai Violet College of Arts and Science at Menambedu.
- Soka Ikeda College of Arts and Science for Women at Madhanankuppam.
- Benson College of Hotel Management and Culinary Arts at Ambattur.
- Velammal Engineering College is located about 6 km from Ambattur at Surapet on the Ambattur–Red Hills Road.

=== Sports amenities ===
Kannan Theatre near Senthil Nagar was closed and converted to Dolphin Sports Academy.

The Ambattur Badminton Association has constructed an indoor shuttle and badminton stadium (Kamalam John Samuel Indoor Stadium, named after the late parents of J. C. D. Prabhakar) located near the TI Cycles factory.

=== Parks ===
Prominent parks of the area include:

- Thangal Lake Park near Menambedu, Pudur
- Krishnapuram Corporation Park (renovated in October 2009)
- Thiruvengada Nagar Corporation Park (opened on 11 October 2013)
- Greater Chennai Corporation Park - Venkatapuram at Kubera Vinayagar Temple Ground (opened in 2014)
- Greater Chennai Corporation Park - VGN Shanthi Nagar, Ambattur
- Greater Chennai Corporation Park - Kallikuppam (Near Tata Communications)
- ICF Emp. Colony Park at Ayapakkam

=== Media outlets ===
Leading English-language daily The New Indian Express has its corporate office in Ambattur Industrial Estate. Other local media outlets in the area include South Indian Post, My Vyapar leading bilingual newspapers (English and Tamil). Ambattur Talk, a local neighbourhood weekly paper from 'Talk Media Pvt. Ltd' is in English. Town News, Seithi Mazhai, The Neighbour City and Kutty News are the local newspapers in Tamil.
