= Anna Nagar railway station =

Railway station in Anna Nagar, India

Anna Nagar Naduvankkarai

General information
- Location: Anna Nagar, Chennai, Tamil Nadu, India
- Coordinates: 13°5′54″N 80°12′0″E
- System: Indian Railways and Chennai Suburban Railway station
- Owner: Ministry of Railways, Indian Railways
- Line: West line of Chennai Suburban Railway
- Platforms: 1
- Tracks: 1

Construction
- Structure type: Standard on-ground station

Other information
- Station code: ANNG
- Fare zone: Southern Railways

History
- Opened: 2003
- Closed: 2007
- Rebuilt: Demolished for Railway yard in 2019
- Electrified: 2003
- Former names: South Indian Railway

Services
Closed
Location

Anna Nagar railway station (station code: ANNG) is one of the two, now defunct, railway stations of the extended southern arm of the Chennai Central–Arakkonam section of the Chennai Suburban Railway Network, the other being Padi railway station. It served the neighbourhood of Anna Nagar, a suburb of Chennai. The station is located on Thirumangalam road, a road that connects Anna Nagar West with Villivakkam, near New Avadi Road, away from the commercial centre of the neighbourhood. An NSG–6 category Indian railway station in Chennai railway division of Southern Railway zone, it is being maintained by the Integral Coach Factory (ICF), the premier production unit of the Indian railways. now this railway station is completely demolished in 2019 and converted into a Railway Yard for long distance trains.

== History ==
In 2003, a 3.09 km-long railway line, initially used by the Integral Coach Factory (ICF) at Perambur for moving newly built coaches from shell to furnishing division of the factory, was strengthened at a cost of ₹ 72.9 million for operating passenger services. Two new stations, namely, Padi and Anna Nagar, were built and 13 existing bridges were renovated and the work was completed in five months. The railway station and the EMU services were inaugurated by the then Union Minister of State for Railways, A. K. Moorthy. Between 2003 and 2007, five suburban trains were being run from Anna Nagar to Chennai Beach via Villivakkam. In 2007, the service was discontinued due to construction of a rotary at the Padi junction replacing the level-crossing. Though the rotary was completed in 2009, services were not restored. However, in 2011, the railways planned to resume services in this section as a feeder service with six-car EMUs.

The tracks and land on which the station is built were originally owned by the ICF. When the Southern Railway intended to operate trains to Padi and Anna Nagar stations, the ICF handed over the land to the Southern Railway. When the train services were withdrawn in 2007, the ICF reclaimed the land from the zonal railway. The tracks and the stations are now used by the ICF for moving spare parts to the manufacturing unit and back. The lines will be used to test semi-high speed coaches running up to 160 km per hour.

== Patronage ==
The service, however, had a low patronage. The average daily counter collection at the station was about ₹ 450, with just about 50 passengers. The monthly revenue never exceeded ₹ 15,000.

However, unlike the rest of the Chennai Suburban Railway network, there is only one line in this section. In addition, the traffic congestion resulting due to closure of a gate near the Padi railway station limits the operation to five pairs of EMU services between Chennai Beach and Anna Nagar.

In a response to a public interest litigation filed in June 2013, the Railways announced that "the decision to discontinue operations at Anna Nagar station was made due to financial considerations. The per-day expense for operating train services between Villivakkam and Anna Nagar costs about ₹30,000, while the income was only a few hundreds."

== See also ==
- Chennai Suburban Railway
- Railway stations in Chennai
