= Padi, Chennai =

Padi
- Neighbourhood
- Padi(Chennai) Padi (Tamil Nadu) Padi (India)
- Coordinates: 13.1037°N 80.1947°E
- Country: India
- State: Tamil Nadu
- District: Chennai District
- Metro: Chennai
- Zone: Ambattur Zone No 7
- Ward: Padi
- Talukas: Ambattur

Government
  - Body: Chennai Corporation

Languages
  - Official: Tamil
- Time zone: UTC+5:30 (IST)
- PIN: 600 050
- Vehicle registration: TN 13 (RTO, Ambattur)
- Lok Sabha constituency: Sriperumpudur
- State Assembly constituency: Ambattur
- Planning agency: CMDA
- Civic agency: Chennai Corporation
- Website: www.chennai.tn.nic.in

Padi (Tamil: [paːɖi]) is a locality and neighbourhood in the city of Chennai, India. It was formerly named Thiruvaaipadi and was later shortened to Padi.

Sundarar, (Tamil saints) came to Padi and sang songs in the Tiruvalithayam Tiruvallesvarar Temple. Padi is exactly 13 km from the city's Kilometre Zero and is one of the newer parts of the city. The Madras Thiruvallur High Road (unofficially known as the CTH Road) passes through Padi. Padi is an industrial area and its infrastructure and living conditions have made this place popular among the working class. Arulmigu Thiruvalithayam Temple in Padi is one of the most famous Guru Bhagawan temples in Chennai. This temple is under the control of Hindu Aranilayathurai. Every year, the Thai Kirthigai is one of the biggest festivals in Padi. Another nearby temple is the Padavattamman Temple.

On 4 October 2013, the Tamil Nadu Highways department issued a GO extending the entire stretch of the road till Tirutani to 6 lanes at a cost of ₹1,680 million, by means of land acquisition from 12 villages. In the first phase, the road will be widened to 100 ft (4 lanes) with center median at a cost of ₹ 980 million.

== Tiruvalithayam Tiruvallesvarar Temple ==
The temple was built by Rajaraja Chola III of Chola Dynasty. Tiruvaleeswarar temple is located at about 1/2 km inside from the Avadi main road. The poet Sambandar has composed hymns at this temple. The east tower has 3 tiers and acts as the main entrance to the temple. Inside the main entrance, there is broad inner courtyard on all the four sides of the main shrine. A garden along the walls of outer corridor decorates the temple. Entering the inner mandapam, the main sanctum sanctorum of Lord Shiva is situated. The sanctum is semi-circular in shape at the back. This type of architecture is called Gaja Brishta Vimana or Thoonganai Maadam in Tamil as this resembles the back of a sleeping elephant. The main deity is known as Tiruvalleeswarar. To the right of him is the shrine for the female deity Jagathambikai. On the 4 walls of the inner corridor encircling the main sanctum sanctorum, there are sculptured images of Surya, Balasubramania, Vinayagar, Dakshinamoorthy, Mahavishnu, Brahma, Durga, etc. There are separate shrines inside the temple for Somaskandar, Murugan with his consorts Valli and Deivanai, Anjaneyar and Meenakshi Sundareswarar. There is also a sivalingam supposed to have been worshipped by Maharishi Bharadwaj. The pillars in this temple have carved images of Hindu Gods, Natarajar, Murugan, Kothandaramar, Machavathara Moorthy, Koormavadhara Moorthy etc.

According to mythology, Lord Brahma's two daughters Kamali and Valli wished to marry Lord Shiva. Knowing that their wish is very difficult to be fulfilled, Lord Brahma sent them to worship Lord Shiva on the banks of river Paalaru. Shiva, being pleased with their penance, appeared before them and told them that it is not possible for them to marry him as he is already married to Parvathi and advised them to marry Lord Ganapathy. Accordingly, they married Lord Ganapathy, who was returning after conquering the demon king Gajamukasuran.

== Thai Kirthigai Festivals Photo Gallery ==
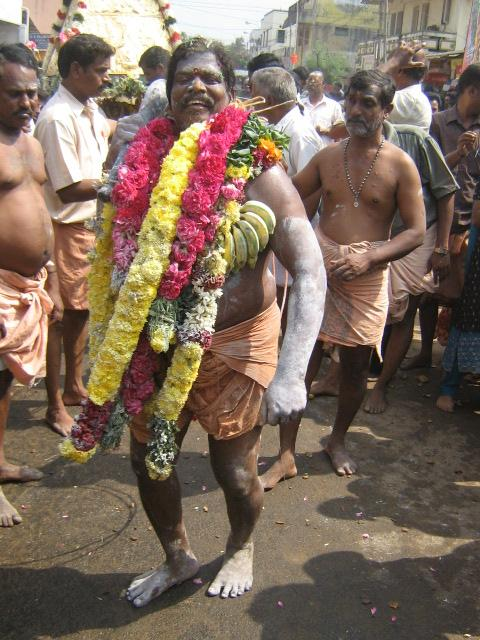
Palani (Murugar Adimai)

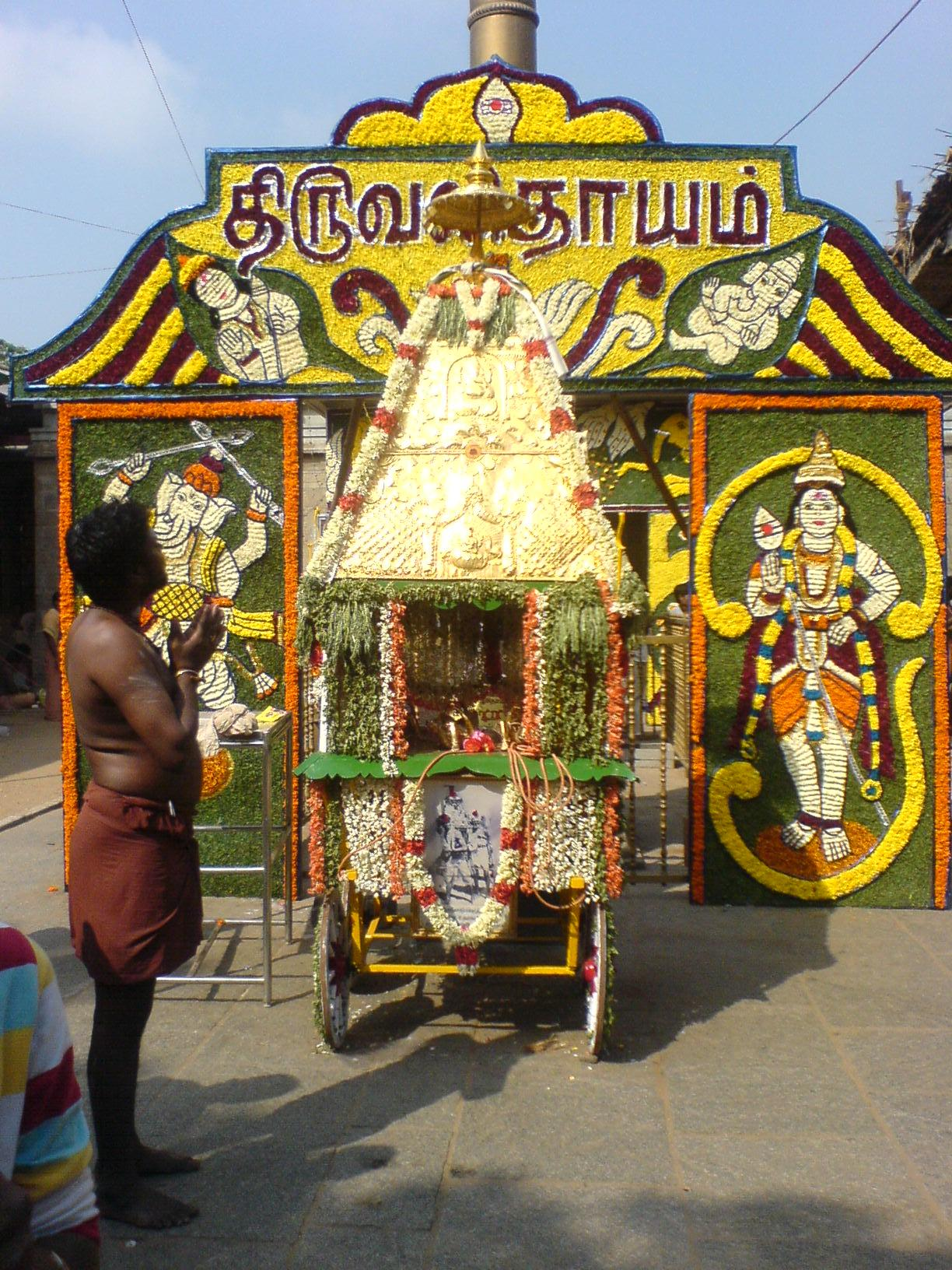
Murugar Ratham

== Main spots in Padi ==
Lucas TVS, Wheels India, Sundaram Fasteners, Sundaram Clayton, Brakes India, and Britannia Industries are some of the industries in this area. These industries provide major employment to people living in Padi and nearby areas, such as Korattur, Ambattur, Mogappair, Anna Nagar, Thirumangalam, Villivakkam, Kolathur, and ICF.

There are also a few BPO companies operating from this area.

The Ambit IT Park, Kosmo One, Price Info Park, Kochar and HCL companies are located Ambattur Industrial Estate.

Retail giant of Chennai, Saravana Stores, has a 10-storey showroom located opposite TVS Lucas.

Pothys opened its biggest showroom in Padi, offering a variety of collections across silk sarees, ethnic wear, garments, and jewellery.

The nearest Railway Station is at Korattur and Villivakkam.

Police Station - Korattur and JJ Nagar, Mogappair

Theaters - Sivasakthi Cinemas, Lakshmibala and Green Cinemas (Radha Theatre) are present in Padi.

In Padi, multiple number showrooms are there like: JSP Honda and Yamaha.

Padi railway station connects Villivakkam and Anna Nagar East railway station.
