= Ambattur Industrial Estate =

Industrial area in Chennai, India

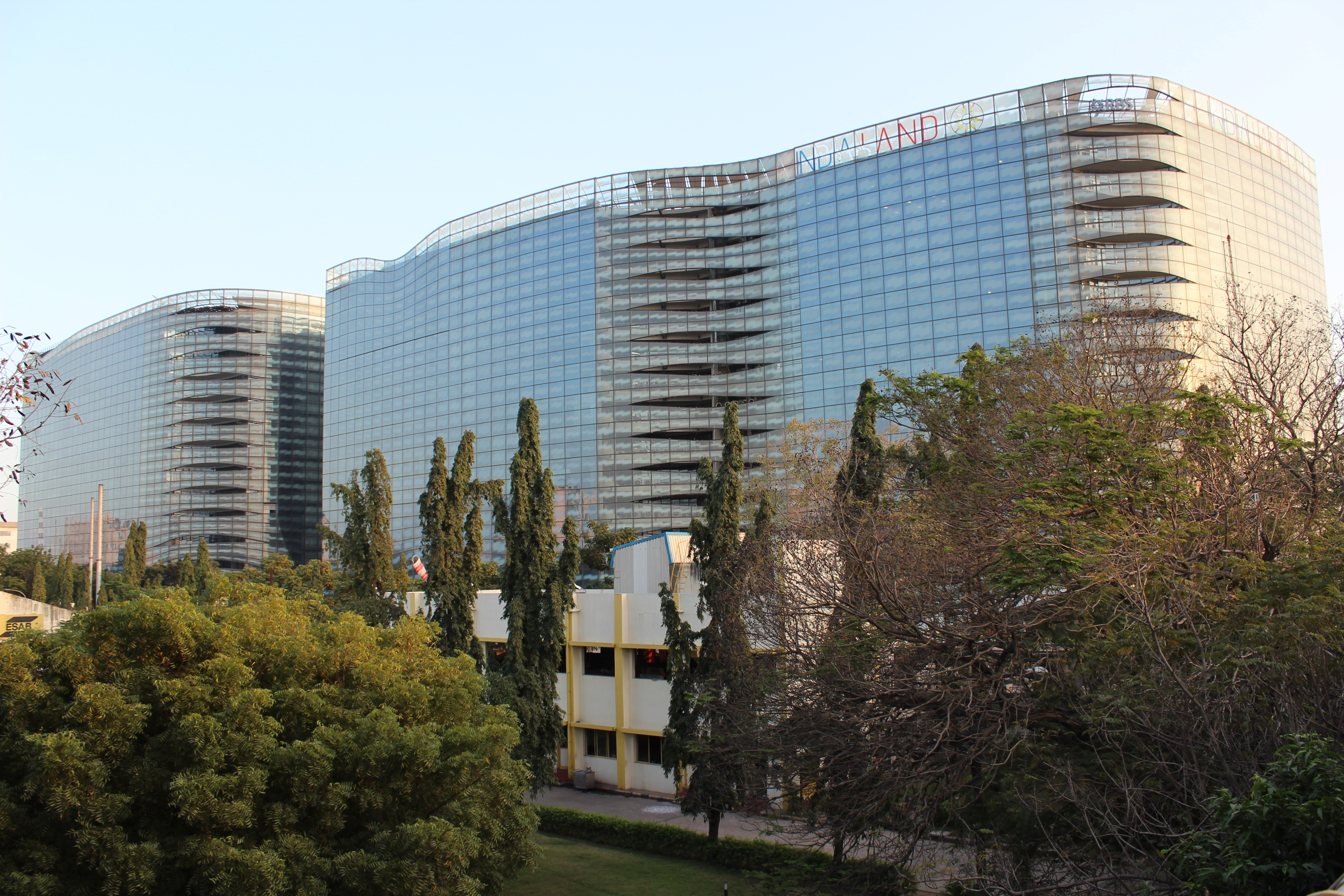
- One IndiaBulls Park, Ambattur Estate
- Interactive map of Ambattur Industrial Estate
- Coordinates: 13.095°N 80.169°E
- Opening date: 1964
- Developer: Government of Tamil Nadu
- Manager: Ambattur Industrial Estate Manufacturers Association (AIEMA)
- Size: 1,430 acres (4.9 km^{2})
- Public transit: Ambattur Estate Bus Terminus; Pattaravakkam railway station Ambattur Estate metro station (proposed)
- Website: www.ambatturindustrialestate.com

Ambattur Industrial Estate is an specially designated industrial area in the Chennai neighbourhood of Ambattur. Established in 1964 as the second industrial estate of the city, the industrial estate stretches across 1,300 acres and is home to over 1,500 small and medium enterprises, specialising largely in automobile components, but also in garments and engineering products. It is one of about ten industrial estates developed by the Tamil Nadu Small Industries Development Corporation in and around the city.

== The industrial estate ==
The Ambattur Industrial Estate is the second industrial estate in the city. Spread over an area of 1,430 acres (4.9 km^{2}), houses about 1,800 units and is the biggest small-scale industrial estate in South Asia. It was commissioned in the year 1964 by the Government of Tamil Nadu. Several factors such as suitability of the soil, communication facilities, availability of raw materials, a large volume of ground water suitable for industrial and domestic purposes, and the like were responsible for seeking this place for the setting up of an industrial estate. An area of 4 km² adjoining the industrial estate was acquired by the Tamil Nadu Housing Board for housing purposes.

Companies like Britannia, TI Cycles of India, Dunlop, and TVS have their plants in Ambattur. VSNL–Tata Communication has its satellite earth station at the Ambattur–Red Hills road, known as wireless among the locals. Jaya TV, Vijay TV, Asianet and Kairali relay signals from this facility. Textile industries such as Ambattur Clothing Limited (ACL) and Bombay Fashions have their facilities here and employ thousands of women. The units in the Industrial Estate generate a combined annual revenue of over ₹ 35,000 million.

Prominent English-language daily The New Indian Express has its corporate office and a press in Ambattur Industrial Estate.

== Waste disposal ==
As of September 2014, the Ambattur Industrial Estate Manufacturers Association (AIEMA) was setting up a transit yard to segregate and dispose about 300 tonnes of waste generated every month. The yard, covering an area of 2,000 sq ft, will be used to segregate garbage from neighbouring residential areas, in addition to hazardous industrial waste. The industrial estate was also planning to set up a common effluent treatment plant with a capacity to treat 200 kilolitres per day at a cost of ₹ 50 million. The plant will be constructed in public–private partnership mode and will become functional by the end of financial year 2014. It is estimated that only about 10 percent of the units discharge effluents. The industrial estate also plans to cover industrial units in a radius of 25 km, such as those in Thirumudivakkam and Thirumazhisai. The treated water will be provided to dyeing units in the estate.

== Golden Jubilee Tower ==
As part of the golden jubilee celebrations in 2014, the AIEMA association plans to construct a golden jubilee tower. It has planted more than 1,500 saplings and has planned to implement solar and power-saving lamps for street illumination.

== Connectivity ==
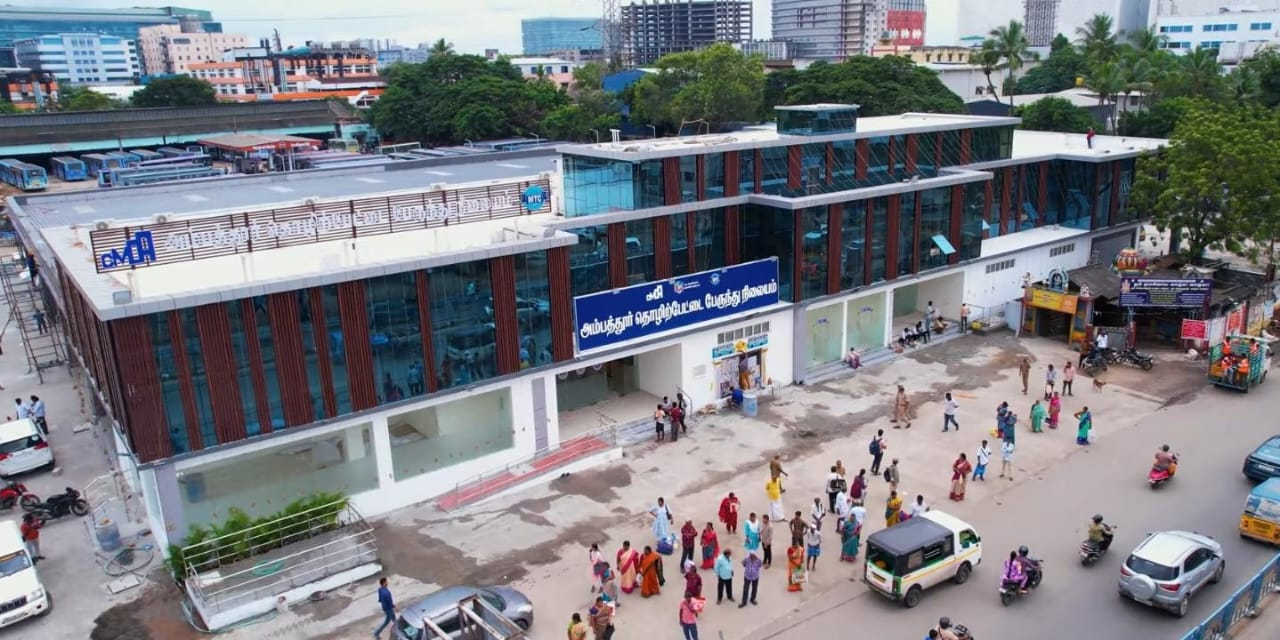
Aerial view of renovated Ambattur Estate Bus stand in 2025

The Ambattur Industrial Estate Bus Terminus, along with a maintenance depot with a capacity for 100 buses, was inaugurated in 1967. As of 2012, the facility handled approximately 125 buses daily and employed around 1,100 staff. The terminus was renovated in 2024-25 by the Chennai Metropolitan Development Authority (CMDA) to improve infrastructure and amenities, and was opened to public on 24 November 2025. The upgraded facility includes ticket booking counters, waiting rooms, commercial spaces, e-bus charging facilities, and an administrative office for the Metropolitan Transport Corporation (MTC).

== See also ==
- Economy of Chennai
