= Shopping in Chennai =

Retail industry and shopping centre in South India

Chennai remains the chief retail industry and shopping centre in South India, with some of its suburbs serving as exclusive shopping districts. Since the formation of the city in the seventeenth century, George Town remains one of the chief commercial neighbourhood of the city. However, with the centuries passing, the central business district of the city started shifting towards the south of Fort St. George and moving to its present location at Gemini Circle. The city's retail industry is concentrated chiefly in T. Nagar, which is by far the largest shopping district of India, generating more than twice the revenue of Connaught Place in New Delhi or Linking Road in Mumbai, even by conservative estimates.

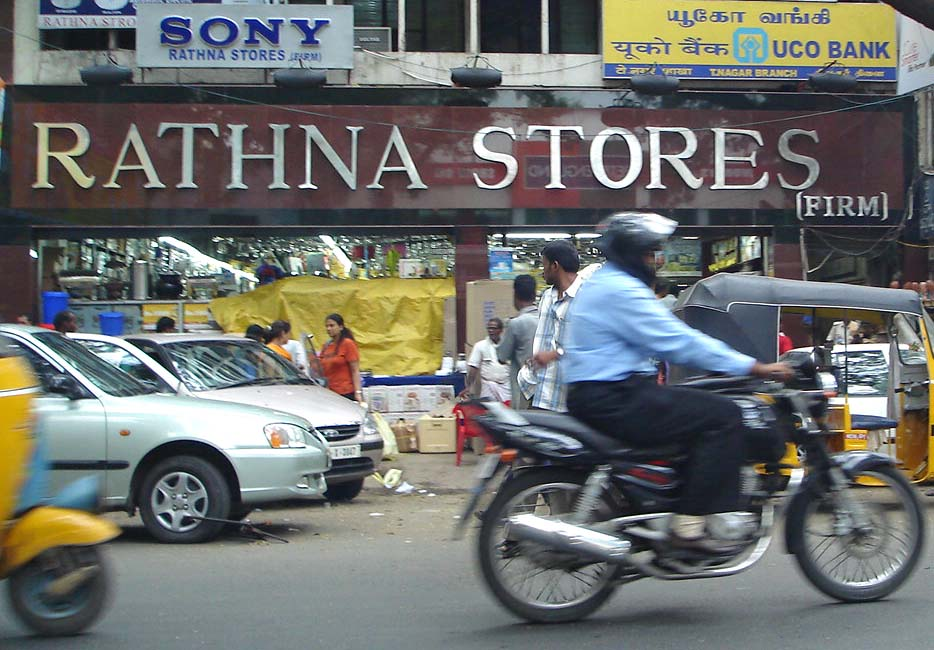
Rathna Stores is one of Chennai's most famous departmental store, located at Pondy Bazaar.

== History ==
The first silk sari shops in the city appeared in George Town towards the end of the nineteenth century. These remained popular until about 1915, when new shops were opened in Chintadripet, followed by shops near the Parthasarathy temple in Triplicane in the following years. By the late 1930s, similar shops were opened near the Kapaleeshwarar temple in Mylapore. By this time, the Long Lake on the western peripheral region of the old city was drained out resulting in the formation of T. Nagar extension from the existing neighborhood of Mambalam in 1923. The laying of suburban railway line from Egmore to Kancheepuram in 1911 resulted in a station at Mambalam. In the 1950s, textile shops appeared in T. Nagar, which were soon followed by jewellery stores, eventually making the neighbourhood as a shopping destination of the present day.

== Retail industry ==
Chennai is the most important gold market in the South Indian region which contributes to 45 percent of the total annual national offtake of 800 tonnes. T. Nagar accounts for about 70 to 80 percent of the gold sold in the city.

According to the 2012 Cushman & Wakefield report Main Streets Across the World, Khader Nawaz Khan Road at Nungambakkam ranked 10th position in the list of 'Top 10 Global Highest Retail Rental Growth Markets 2012', with 36.7 percent increase in rents.

=== Notable shopping malls ===
| Name | Location | Year | Size | Source |
|---|---|---|---|---|
| Spencer Plaza | Mount Road | 1863 | 250,000 sq ft (23,000 m^{2}) | |
| Alsa Mall | Montieth Road, Egmore | 1998 | | |
| Abhirami Mega Mall | Purasawalkam | 2003 | | |
| Mayajaal | Kanathur, East Coast Road | 2006 | 30,000 sq ft (2,800 m^{2}) | |
| Chennai Citi Centre | Dr.Radhakrishnan Salai, Mylapore | 2006 | 117,600 sq ft (10,930 m^{2}) | |
| Ampa Skywalk | Poonamallee High Road, Aminjikarai | 2009 | 650,000 sq ft (60,000 m^{2}) | |
| Express Avenue | Whites Road, Royapettah | 2010 | 1,500,000 sq ft (140,000 m^{2}) | |
| Chandra Mall | Arcot road, Virugambakkam | 2011 | 143,130 sq ft (13,297 m^{2}) | |
| Vivira Mall | Navalur, OMR | 2011 | 300,000 sq ft (28,000 m^{2}) | |
| Spectrum Mall | Paper Mills Road, Perambur | 2011 | 160,000 sq ft (15,000 m^{2}) | |
| Ramee Mall | Anna Salai, Teynampet | 2012 | 225,000 sq ft (20,900 m^{2}) | |
| Bergamo | Khader Nawaz Khan Road, Nungambakkam | 2012 | 40,000 sq ft (3,700 m^{2}) | |
| Gold Souk Grandé Mall Chennai | GST Road, Vandalur | 2015 | 800,000 sq ft (74,000 m^{2}) | |
| Phoenix Market City (Chennai) | Velachery | 2013 | 2,400,000 sq ft (220,000 m^{2}) | |
| Forum Vijaya Mall | Arcot road, Vadapalani | 2013 | 700,000 sq ft (65,000 m^{2}) | |
| VR Chennai | Inner Ring Road, Anna Nagar West | 2018 | 2,000,000 sq ft (190,000 m^{2}) | |
| The Marina Mall, Chennai | OMR Road, Egattur | 2019 | 550,000 sq ft (51,000 m^{2}) | |
| BSR Mall | Thoraipakkam | 2020 | 140,000 sq ft (13,000 m^{2}) | |
| Saravana Selvarathnam Ultimate Store Mall | Pallavaram | 2022 | 250,000 sq ft (23,000 m^{2}) | |

== See also ==
- Economy of Chennai
