= Abhirami Mega Mall =

Abirami Mega Mall
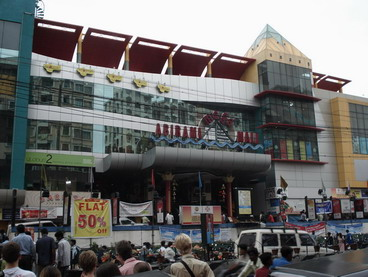
- Abirami Mega Mall in 2007
- Location: Purasawalkam, Chennai, Tamil Nadu, India
- Coordinates: 13.086185°N 80.248078°E
- Address: 152, Purasawalkam, Chennai, Tamil Nadu - 600010
- Opened: 1976
- Closed: 2019
- Owner: Abirami Ramanathan
- Floors: 3
- Parking: Yes, One level basement parking
- Website: abirami.in

Abirami Mega Mall was a shopping mall located in Purasawalkam, Chennai. It was constructed in 1976. Named after its owner Abirami Ramanathan, it was closed in 2019.

== Theaters ==
- Abirami 7 Star Theatre
- Shree Annai Abirami
- Robot Bala Abirami
- Swarna Sakthi Abirami
- Mothi screen Abirami

== Filmography ==
Films

- Panchamirtham (2008)
- Unnodu Ka (2015)

Television

- Abhirami (Kalaignar TV)

== See also ==
- Ampa Skywalk
- Chennai Citi Centre
- Express Avenue
- Spencer Plaza
