= Alsa Mall =

Shopping mall in Chennai, India

Coordinates: 13.068636°N 80.257157°E

Alsa Mall is a shopping mall on Montieth Road in the neighbourhood of Egmore in Chennai, India. Established in the mid-1980s, along with the Spencer Plaza, it is one of the oldest surviving malls in the city. Alsa Mall has a variety of shops in and around it. It is also considered to be a hangout location for youngsters during evening owing to the variety of street food vendors who hold business in the mall.

== History ==
Alsa Mall was a private property before it was converted into a mall. Along with the Spencer Plaza, it remained one of the premier shopping malls in the city until the 2000s, when numerous malls began to appear across the city. In 2013, the mall became the first mall to host the state-owned Tamil Nadu State Marketing Corporation's (Tasmac) first premium alcoholic beverages outlet.

== See also ==
- Shopping in Chennai
