= EVR Periyar Salai =

Arterial road in Chennai, India

- Grand Western Trunk Road, Poonamallee High Road, State Highway Urban 86
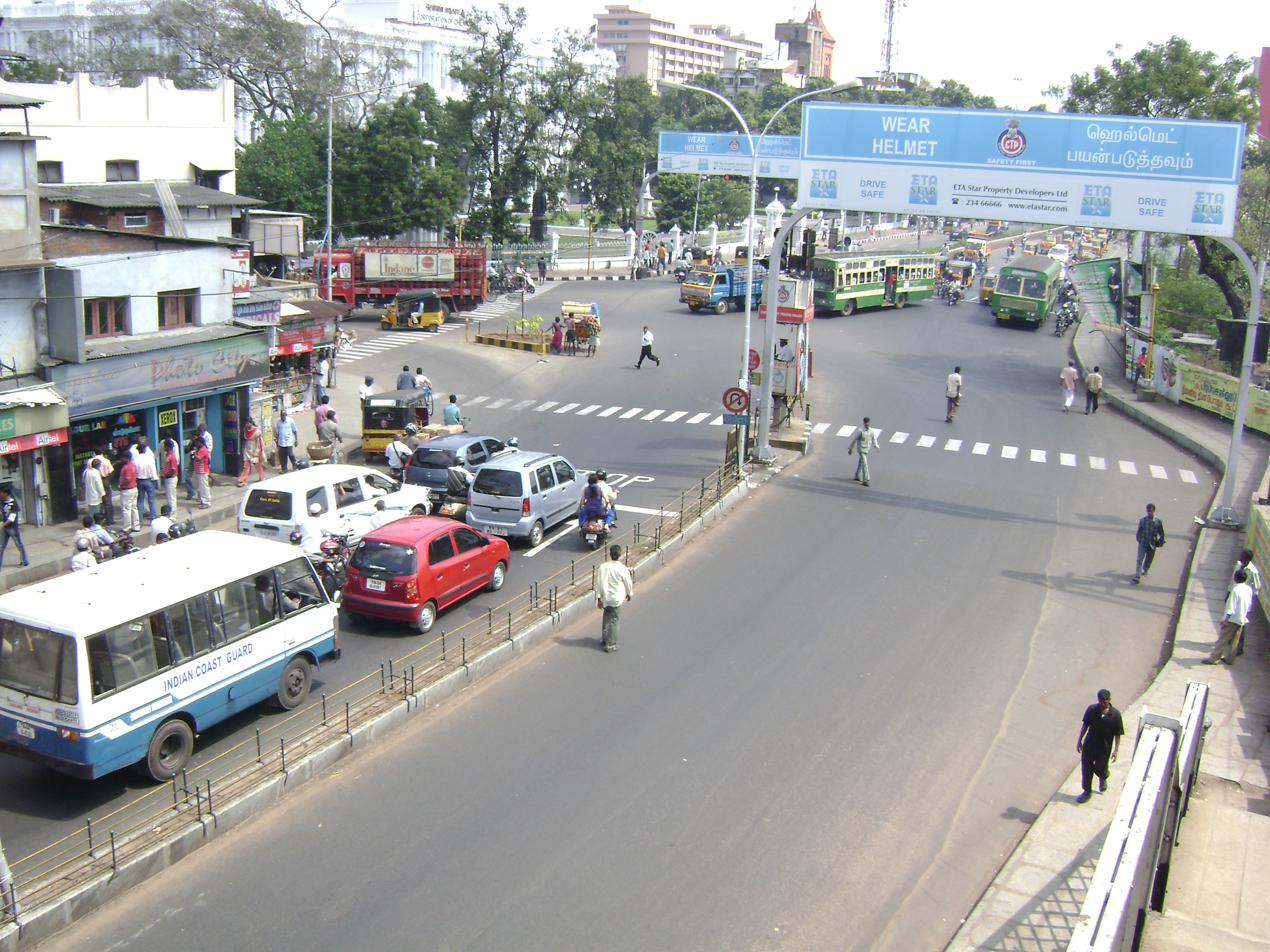
- Poonamallee High Road in Park Town (2008)
- Interactive map of EVR Periyar Salai
- Namesake: EVR Periyar
- Maintained by: Highways and Minor Ports Department; Corporation of Chennai
- Length: 8.7 mi (14.0 km); The 8.7-mile stretch refers to the stretch from Muthuswamy Bridge near Madras Medical College at Park Town in the east to the Maduravoyal Junction in the west. The stretch continues further west to a national highway (NH4).
- Coordinates: 13.0746°N 80.2198°E
- East end: Muthuswamy Bridge near Madras Medical College at Park Town, Chennai
- West end: Maduravoyal bypass junction, Chennai

EVR Periyar Salai (SHU 86)(EVR High Road), earlier known as Poonamallee High Road (NH 48) and originally the Grand Western Trunk Road, is an arterial road in Chennai, India. It is the longest road in Chennai. Running from east to west, the 14-kilometre (8.7 mi) road starts at Muthuswamy Bridge near Madras Medical College at Park Town and ends near Maduravoyal Junction via Kilpauk, Aminjikarai, Anna Nagar Arch, Arumbakkam, Koyambedu. It further continues west towards Poonamallee and traverses the towns of Sriperumbudur, Walajapet, and Ranipet.

The road, particularly along its eastern end, has some of the most impressive civic institutions and heritage structures of the city, including the Ripon Building (the seat of civic body), the Victoria Public Hall (the city's Town Hall), the Central train station, the Moore Market (razed in the late 20th century), Madras Medical College, and St Andrew's Church

It connects two of the vital transport installations of the city, Chennai Central railway station and the CMBT. The road has more hospitals than any other roads in the city and is popularly known as the city's 'Med street'. The road is named after the noted social activist and politician Periyar E. V. Ramasamy.

== History ==
The road was originally known as Grand Western Trunk (GWT) Road and was built in the 1850s by the then British government. The road was numbered as NH4 and was locally known as the Poonamallee High Road. Originally built to connect Fort St. George to a British military installation some 23 kilometers west of the city, it remained the city's longest road.

When the city of Madras became the most prominent port city, arterial roads emerged from the city's center traversing in all the three directions. The roads that traversed north, west and south were respectively named the Grand Northern Trunk (GNT) Road, the Grand Western Trunk (GWT) Road, and the Grand Southern Trunk (GST) Road. The GNT Road eventually became the Chennai–Kolkata Highway, the GWT Road became the Chennai–Mumbai Highway (NH4), and the GST Road became the Chennai–Kanyakumari Highway (NH45). The stretches of these road within the city came to be known as Wall Tax Road, Poonamallee High Road, and Mount Road, respectively.

== The road ==
EVR Periyar Salai is six metres (20 ft) wide in most stretches, except for the stretch between Koyambedu and Anna Nagar Arch, which has only four lanes. The width of the road varies from two to nine lanes or from 12 to 35 metres (39 to 115 ft). The road narrows at the stretches between Ripon Building and Government Fine Arts College, Pachaiyappa's College and Shenoy Nagar junction, and DG Vaishnav College and Koyambedu. The road has not been widened since the 1980s. The road is used by more than 185,000 vehicles every day. Heavy containers from and to the Chennai Port use this road at night, making it one of the heavily worn roads of the city and necessitating regular re-laying. As of 2008, about 11,000 passenger cars cross any given point of the road every hour. As of 2013, this has been projected to 19,000 passenger cars, more than five times the designed capacity of the road.

== Bridges ==
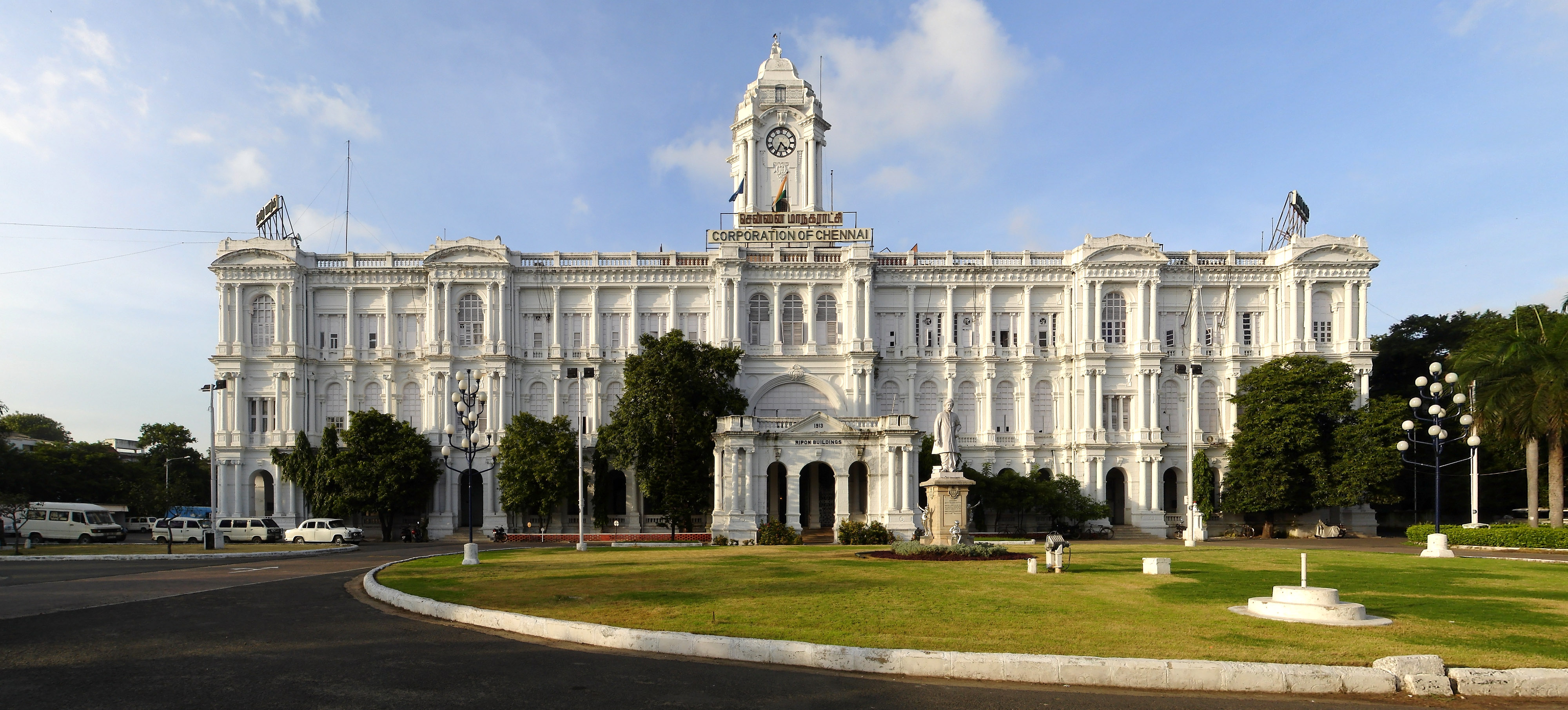
Panorama of the Ripon Building

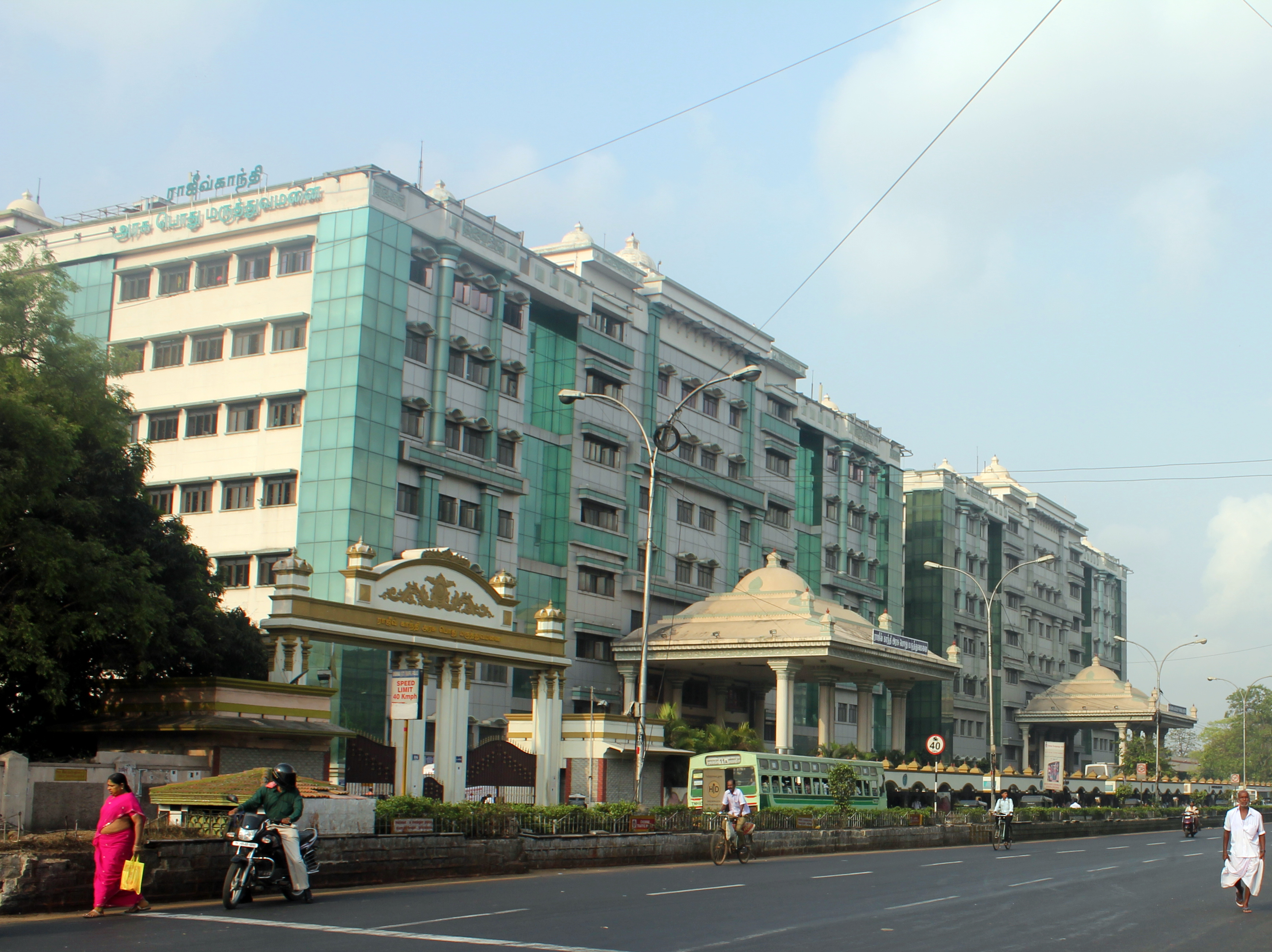
Government General Hospital

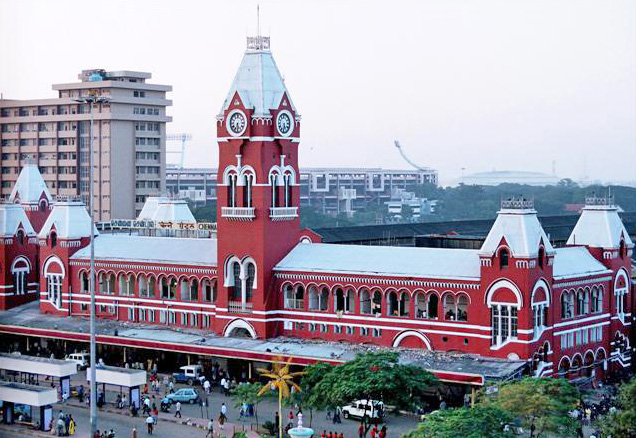
Chennai Central railway station

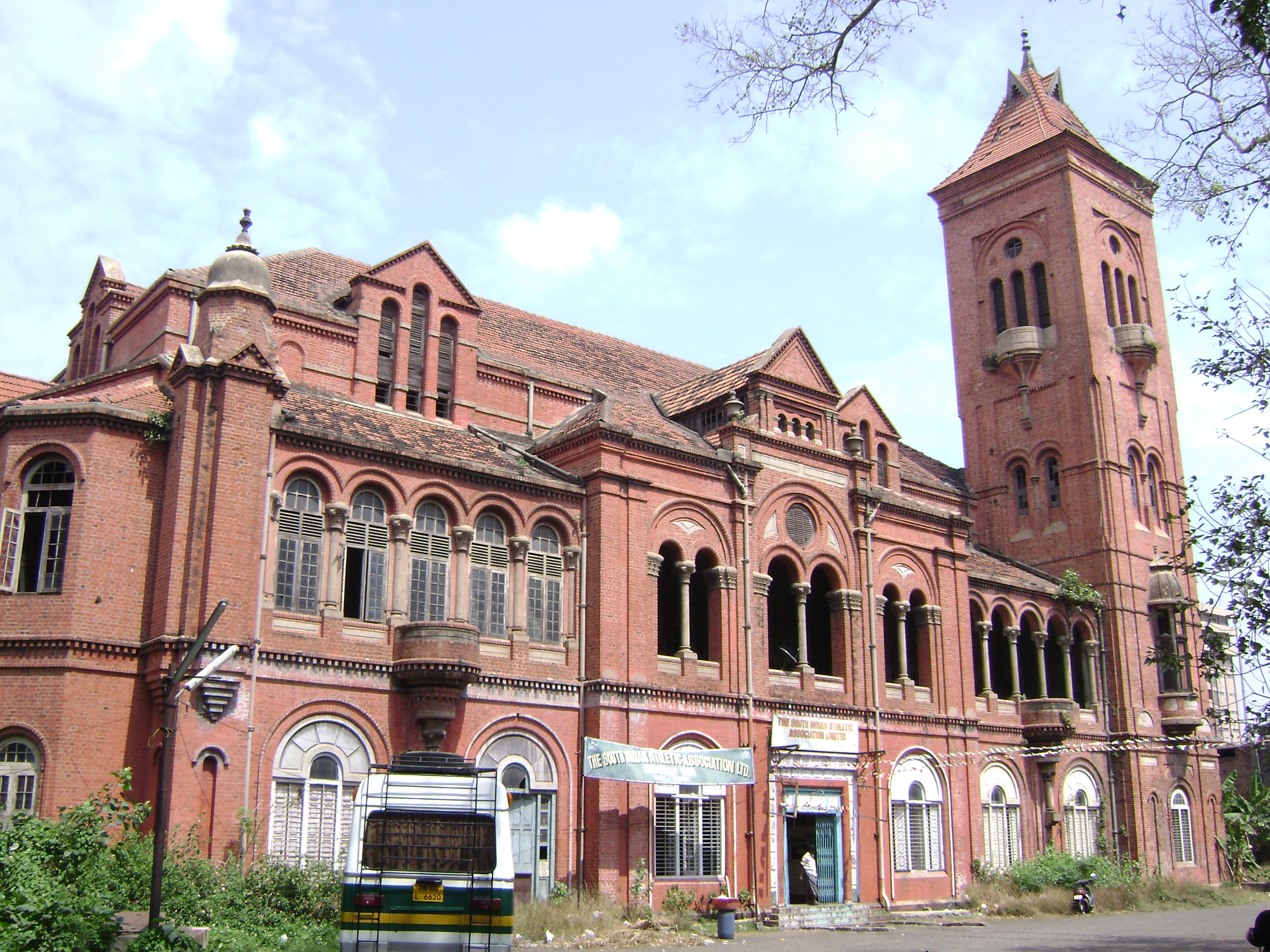
Victoria Public Hall

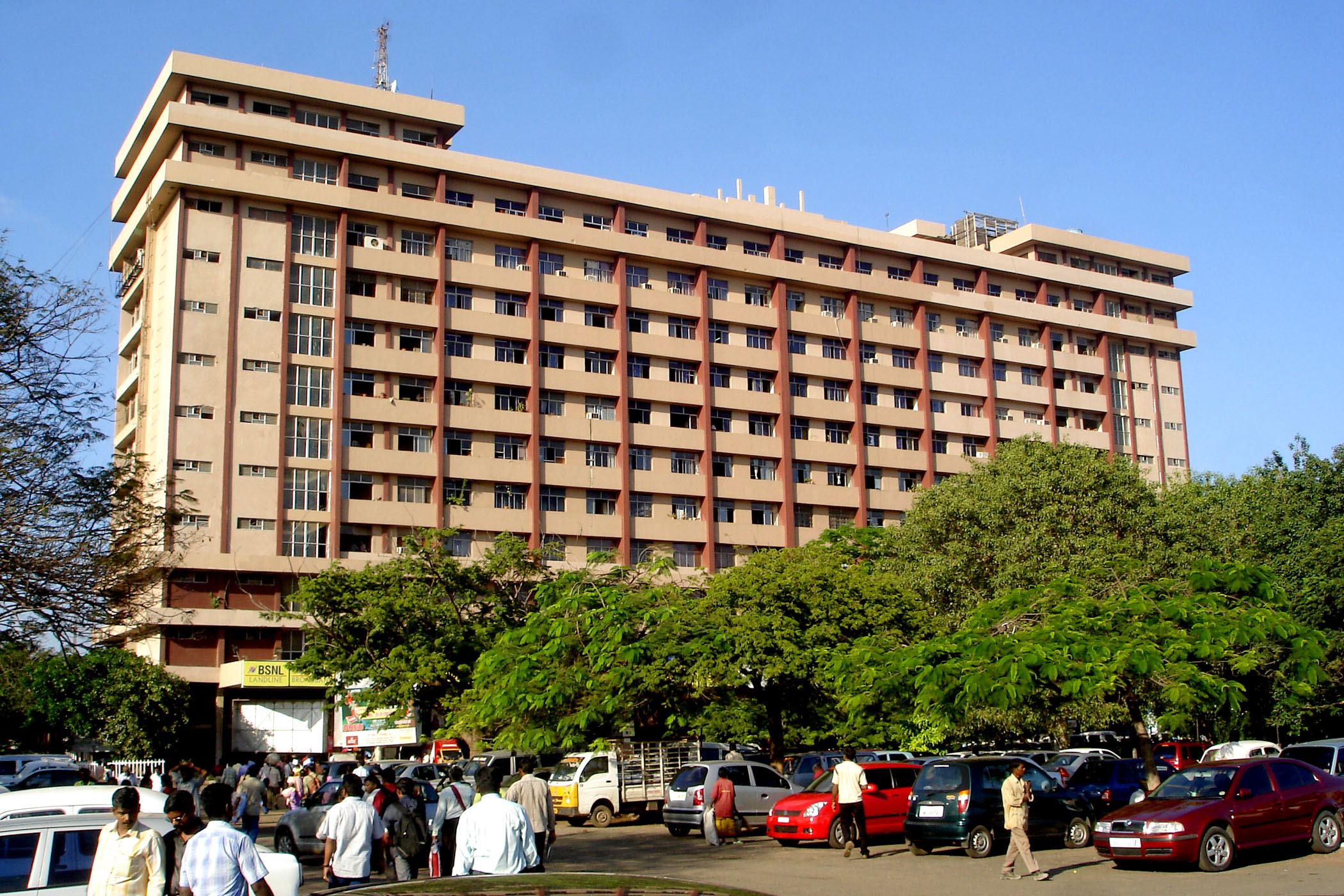
Moore Market Complex Building

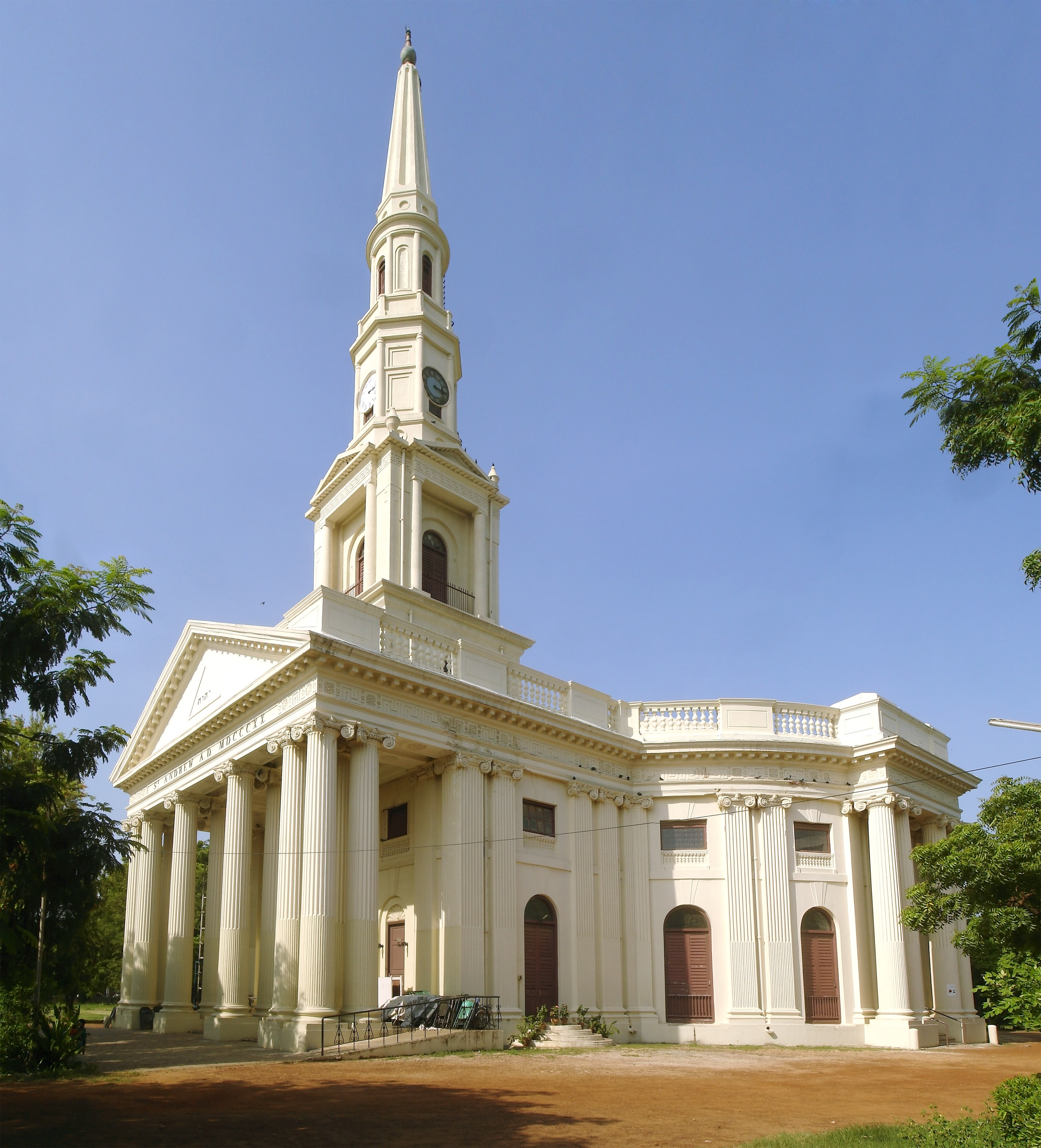
St Andrews Church

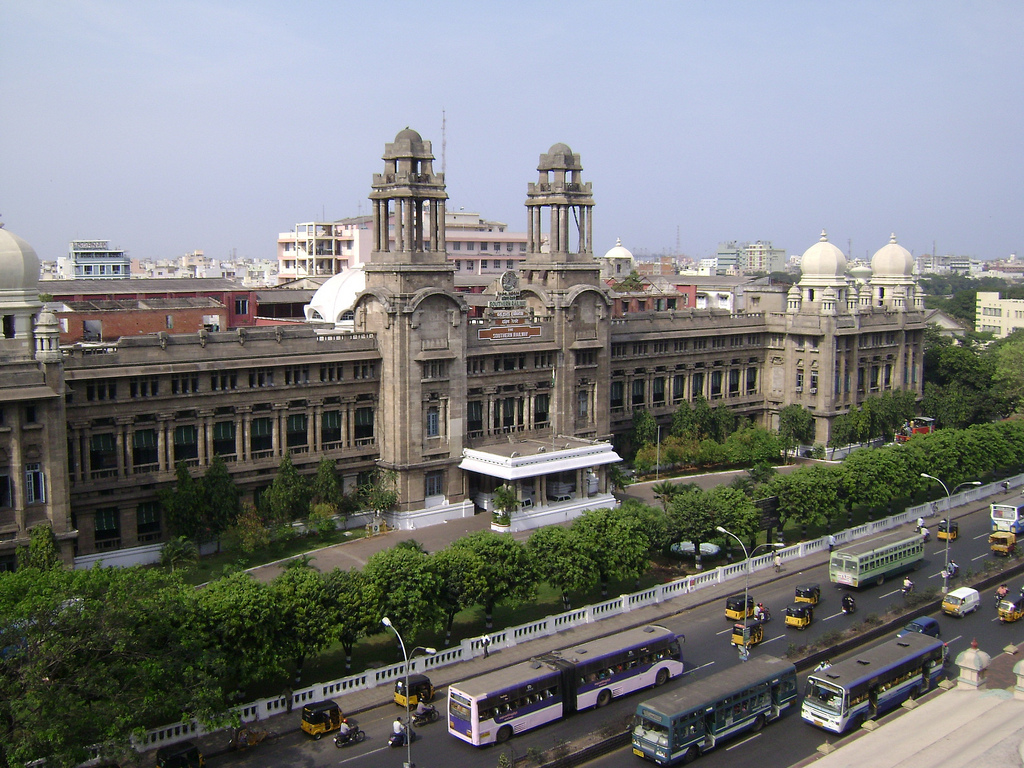
Southern Railways headquarters building

In 2011, the bridge across Cooum River at Aminjikkarai was widened at a cost of ₹ 69 million.

In 2013, a new and wider bridge on the road across the Cooum river near Ampa Skywalk was planned at an estimated cost of ₹ 80 million under the Chennai Metropolitan Development Programme (CMDP). The 47-m-long bridge with 10 lanes, which will be the third "high-level bridge" over the river, will be broader than the road with 6 lanes. The bridge, at road level, will be at a height of 9.5 m from the riverbed. The bridge will have the same design as the old one abutting it, with two abutments and two piers.

== 'Med street' ==
With several hospitals, clinics, pharmacies and diagnostic laboratories dotting its entire length, EVR Periyar Salai is often called Chennai's 'med street', similar to London's Harley Street. The establishment of two of the major government-run hospitals, the Rajiv Gandhi Government General Hospital and the Kilpauk Medical College and Hospital, remains a significant reason behind the road's morphing into a medical destination. The stretch is also home to Pandalai Nursing Home, one of the earliest private hospitals in the city, established in 1932, prior to which all hospitals were run by either the British or missionaries. Many private healthcare centres were opened since then, such as B M Sundaravadanan Nursing Home in 1934 and Ramarau Polyclinic in 1938, which had one of the earliest X-ray units. The stretch also has about 25 standalone pharmacies.

== Traffic ==
As of 2014, the arterial stretch carries around 250,000 vehicles a day, of which two-wheelers constituted 60 percent, cars 30 percent, and buses and other heavy vehicles the remaining.

== Landmarks ==
Major landmarks dotting the road include the following:

- Madras Medical College
- Southern Railway headquarters
- Government General Hospital
- Chennai Central railway station
- Moore Market Complex
- Chennai Park railway station
- Victoria Public Hall
- Ripon Building
- Siddique Sarai (built 1921)
- Government Fine Arts College
- Chennai Traffic Police Headquarters
- St. Andrew's Church (built 1821)
- Wesley Church
- Nehru Park
- Sangam Theatre Complex
- Kumaran Hospital
- Kilpauk Medical College and Hospital
- Ega Theatre
- Pachaiyappa's College
- St. Georges Higher Secondary School
- Ampa Skywalk mall
- Government Hospital of Indian Medicine
- Anna Arch
- Dwaraka Doss Goverdhan Doss Vaishnav College
- Koyambedu grade separator
- Rohini Theatre Complex
- Maduravoyal grade separator
- Sindhi College
- ACS Medical College and Hospital
- Saveetha Dental College

== Widening ==
In May 2013, a 300-m stretch of the road at Shenoy Nagar near Aminjikarai which acted as a bottleneck was widened, following a Madras High Court ruling. Officials of the state highways department cleared the encroachments that had reduced the width of the road.

== Future projects ==
In the early 2000s, Chennai Metropolitan Development Authority (CMDA) conceived an idea of a 6.5-km stretch connecting the two arterial stretches of Poonamallee High Road and Anna Salai in the city. The idea is to create a traffic corridor connecting Anna Salai and Poonamallee High Road through the congested neighbourhoods of Chetpet, Nungambakkam and T. Nagar. In 2014, the Corporation modified the original alignment to create two corridors, namely, a 3.5-km stretch from Anna Salai to Mahalingapuram and a 3-km flyover connecting Thirumalai Pillai Road and Poonamallee High Road (covering five traffic bottlenecks in Chetpet junction, Sterling Road junction, Tank Bund Road junctions and Valluvar Kottam High Road junction).

In 2014, the highways department fixed the alignment of a 5.18-km-long, 4-laned elevated corridor that will take off at Raja Muthiah Salai, near Ripon Buildings, and descend near Pulla Reddy Avenue in Shenoy Nagar. The project has been estimated to cost ₹4,500 million.

== See also ==
- Transport in Chennai
