= Ampa Skywalk =

Shopping mall in Chennai, India

Ampa Skyone
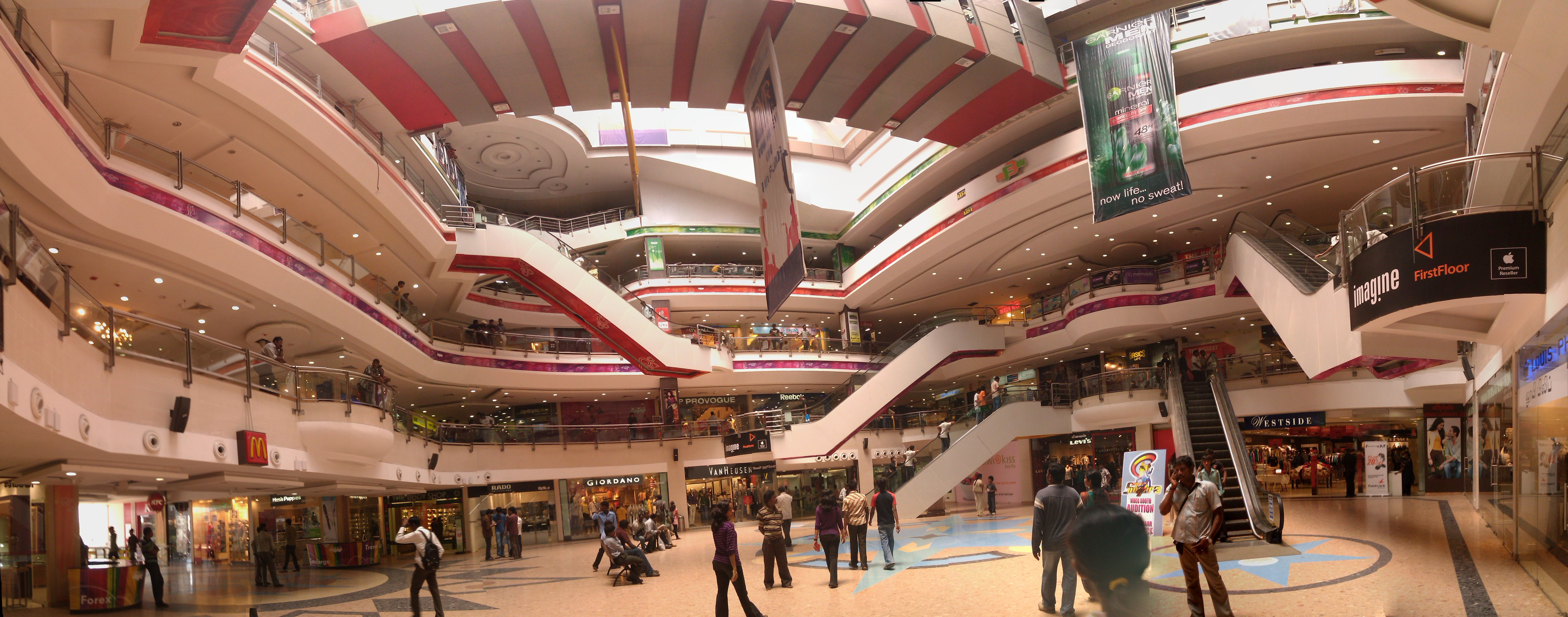
- Interior of Ampa Skyone
- Location: Aminjikarai, Chennai, India
- Coordinates: 13.07363°N 80.221416°E
- Address: Poonamallee High Road
- Opened: 28 September 2009; 17 years ago
- Developer: Ampa Housing Development Pvt. Ltd.
- Owner: Ampa Housing Development Pvt. Ltd.
- Num. of stores: 50 major stores and 26 eatouts
- Num. of anchor tenants: 5
- Floor area: 315,000 sq ft (29,300 m^{2})
- Floors: 6
- Parking: 1,000 cars + 1,000 two-wheelers
- Website: ampaskywalk.com

Ampa Skyone (formerly known as Ampa Skywalk) is a shopping mall in Chennai, India. With three floors of retail space, it has outlets for major clothing and apparel brands, a seven-screen multiplex, a games zone and a food court.

== Location ==
The mall is located at Aminjikarai on the banks of Cooum River at the junction of Poonamallee High Road and Nelson Manikkam Road.

== The mall ==
The mall is built on a three-acre plot. Built at a cost of ₹ 1,100 million, the 650,000 sq ft (60,000 m^{2}) mall features a three-level retail space of 315,000 sq ft (29,300 m^{2}). 22 shops were opened on the launch day, with the rest opening in phases. There is a 25m skywalk connecting the ticket boxes to the theatres. The food court in the mall, named F3, can accommodate 650 persons. The mall also has a 10,000 sq ft (930 m^{2}) gaming area and a 20-room boutique hotel run by Auromatrix Hotels.

The mall has an eight-level parking lot which can accommodate approximately 1,000 cars and 1,000 two-wheelers. The parking scheme is considered relatively unorganized without clear marking or signage.

== See also ==
- Abhirami Mega Mall
- Chennai Citi Centre
- Express Avenue
- Spencer Plaza
