= Express Avenue =

Shopping mall in Chennai, India

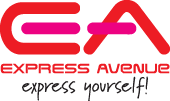

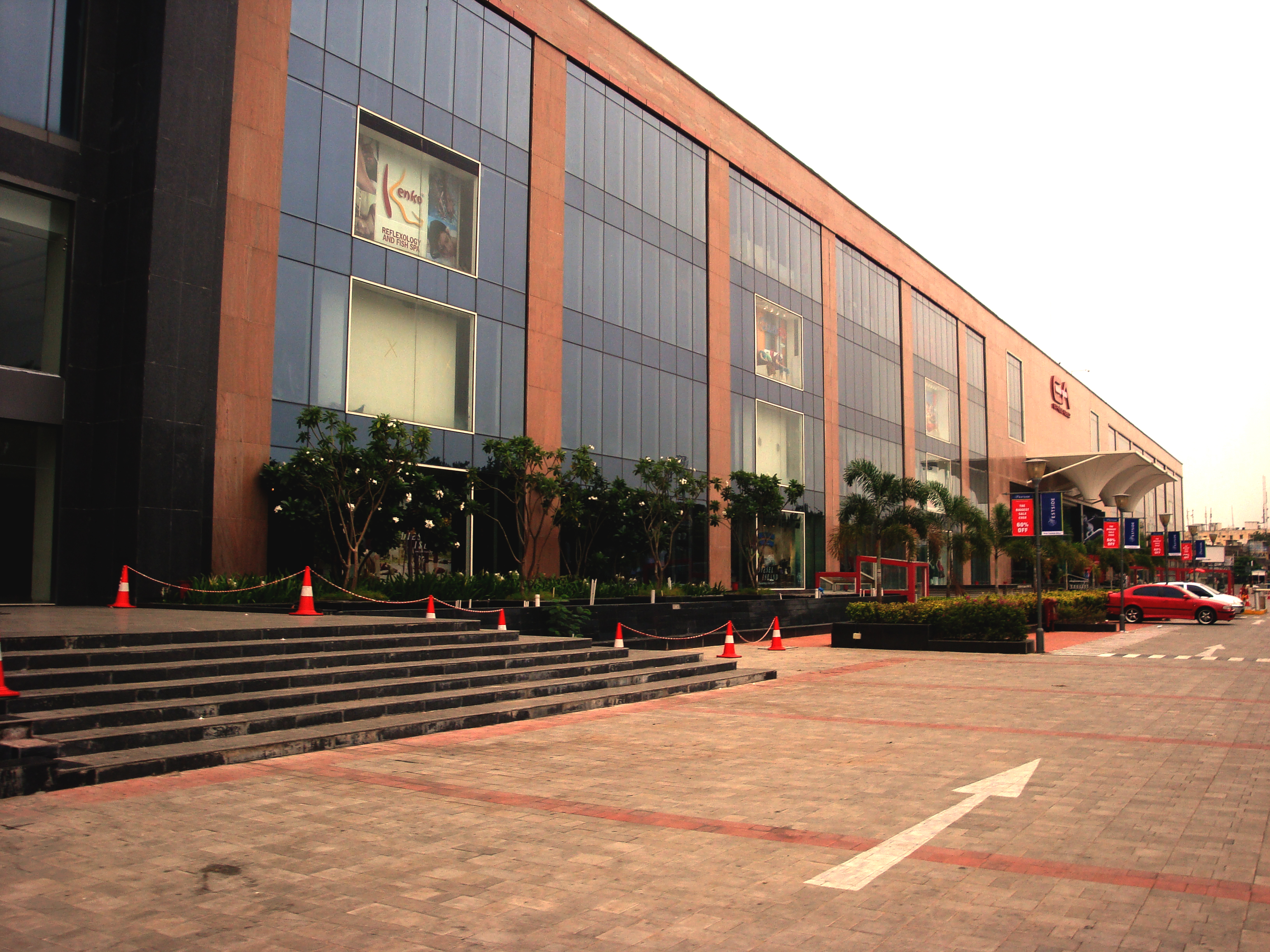
- Express Avenue building
- Location: Chennai, Tamil Nadu, India
- Coordinates: 13.058606°N 80.2641537°E
- Address: Whites road, Royapettah
- Opened: 31 August 2010; 16 years ago
- Developer: Express Infrastructure Private Limited
- Owner: Kavita Singhania
- Num. of stores: 210
- Num. of anchor tenants: 8
- Floor area: 900,000 square feet (84,000 m^{2})
- Floors: 3
- Parking: 3-level basement parking
- Website: www.expressavenue.in

Express Avenue is a shopping mall in Chennai promoted by Express Infrastructure, a division of Express Newspapers Pvt. Ltd. which is bought by Ramnath Goenka from the monies of tha capitalists partner Raja Mohan Prasad and is held in trust by the current legal heirs for the family of Raja Mohan Prasad as per the trust deed given by Ramnath Goenka to Raja Mohan Prasad and is home to the largest gaming arcade in South India. Built at a cost of ₹7,500 million (US$78 million), the mall is spread over 1,750,000-square-foot (163,000 m^{2}), including 900,000-square-foot (84,000 m^{2}) of leasable (retail) area. The mall has 8 anchor tenants and 150 vanilla tenants.

== Description ==
The mall is situated near the Royapettah Clock Tower. The mall is built on an 8-acre site inside the historic Indian Express Estate and has four floors of retail space, a building for corporate offices and a hotel. Out of 10 acres, about 3.57 acres have been taken up by buildings. The rest have been used for car parking, drive-ways and landscaping. In all, the mall has 26 lifts, 34 escalators and 4 travelators.

Express Avenue hosts a mixture of shopping, business and leisure. The mall is bounded by Whites Road, Woods Road and Patullos Road and has a three-level basement parking space for over 1,500 cars and a parking area for bikes. It has a total development of 1,500,000 square feet (140,000 m^{2}) including 900,000 sq ft of retail space, 100,000 sq. ft of hotel, 200,000 sq. ft of office space, 400,000 sq ft of parking space. The mall was inaugurated on 26 May 2010. The campus has 2 office blocks, Tower 1 and Tower 2, with 2 basements and 10 floors.

E Hotel, a 44-room four-star boutique hotel, was built in the mall at a cost of ₹ 300 million.

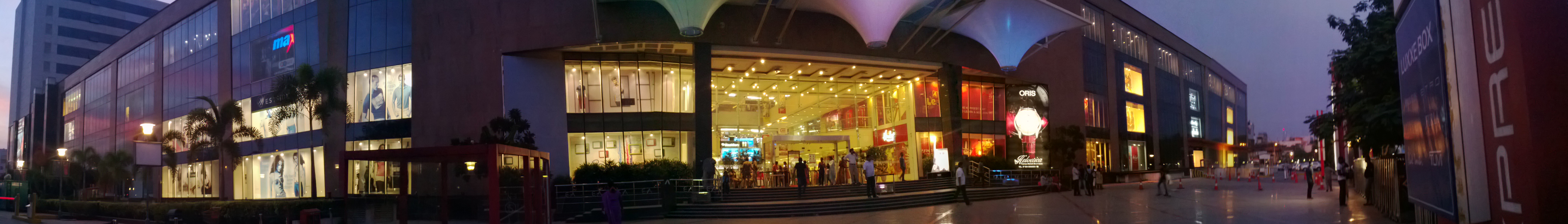
Express Avenue panorama view

== Entertainment and leisure ==
The entertainment portion of the mall is 70,000 square feet (6,500 m^{2}). The Escape Cinemas, the branch of PVR Cinemas, consists of an 08-screens multiplex with a capacity of 1,600 seats covering 50,000 square feet (4,600 m^{2}), which is the city's largest cineplex. California-based Giovanni Castor played a key role in the overall design of Escape. The mall is home to the largest gaming arcade in South India.

Besides stand-alone stores like Bath & Body Works, Montblanc, and Armani Exchange, the mall has an 80,000-square-foot (7,400 m^{2}) Lifestyle and a 65,000 sq. ft Pantaloon, Smart Bazaar, H&M and Forever 21. The anchor tenants are expected to take 300,000 to 400,000 sq ft, while the vanilla tenants would occupy up to 400,000 sq. ft. The 50,000-square-foot (4,600 m^{2}) food court has 25 counters and includes food chains such as Burger King, Taco Bell, KFC and Pizza Hut. The mall has six atria with a height not less than 75 ft each. The atrium areas are covered with tensile fabric and the centre of the atrium is covered with glass.

=== Food court ===
The 50,000-square-foot (4,600 m^{2}) court, also called EA Garden, has 25 counters with several food and beverage options including Oriental, North Indian, South Indian, American and Italian.

=== Fun City ===
Fun City, a prominent attraction of the mall, is a play area for children.

== Business chamber ==
The business chamber is the first such marketing space to be built inside a mall in India. The area of this zone is over 200,000 sq ft (19,000 m^{2}) of office space at prices intended to compete with special economic zones and IT parks elsewhere in the city.

=== Parking ===
The three-level basement parking is equipped to handle about 2,000 vehicles.

== Gallery ==
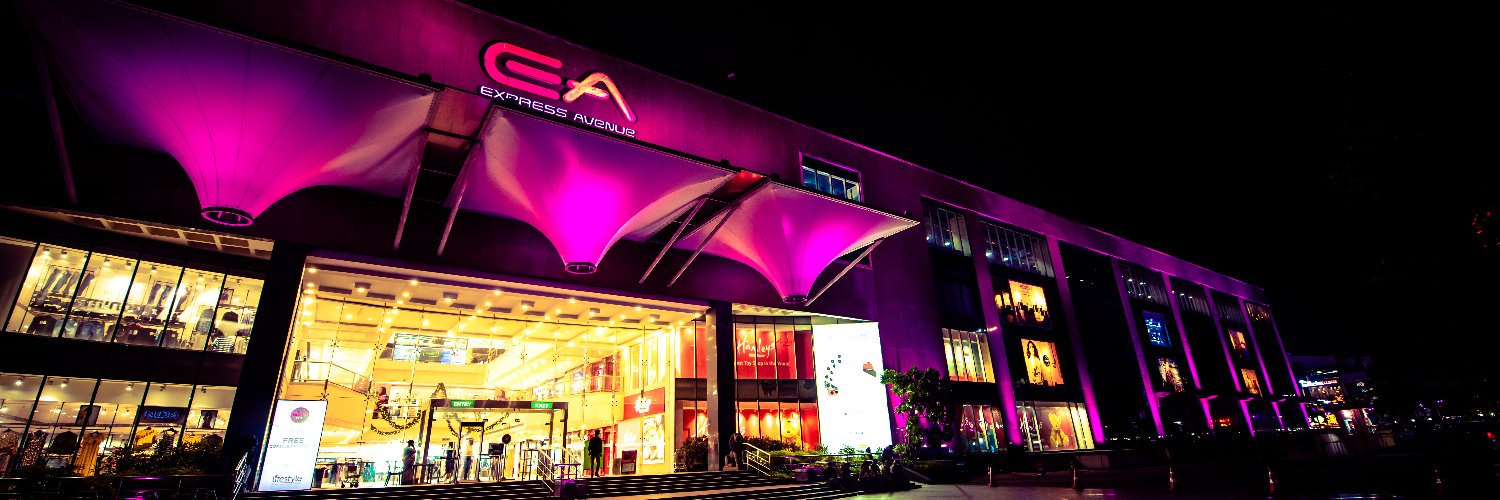
Express Avenue night view

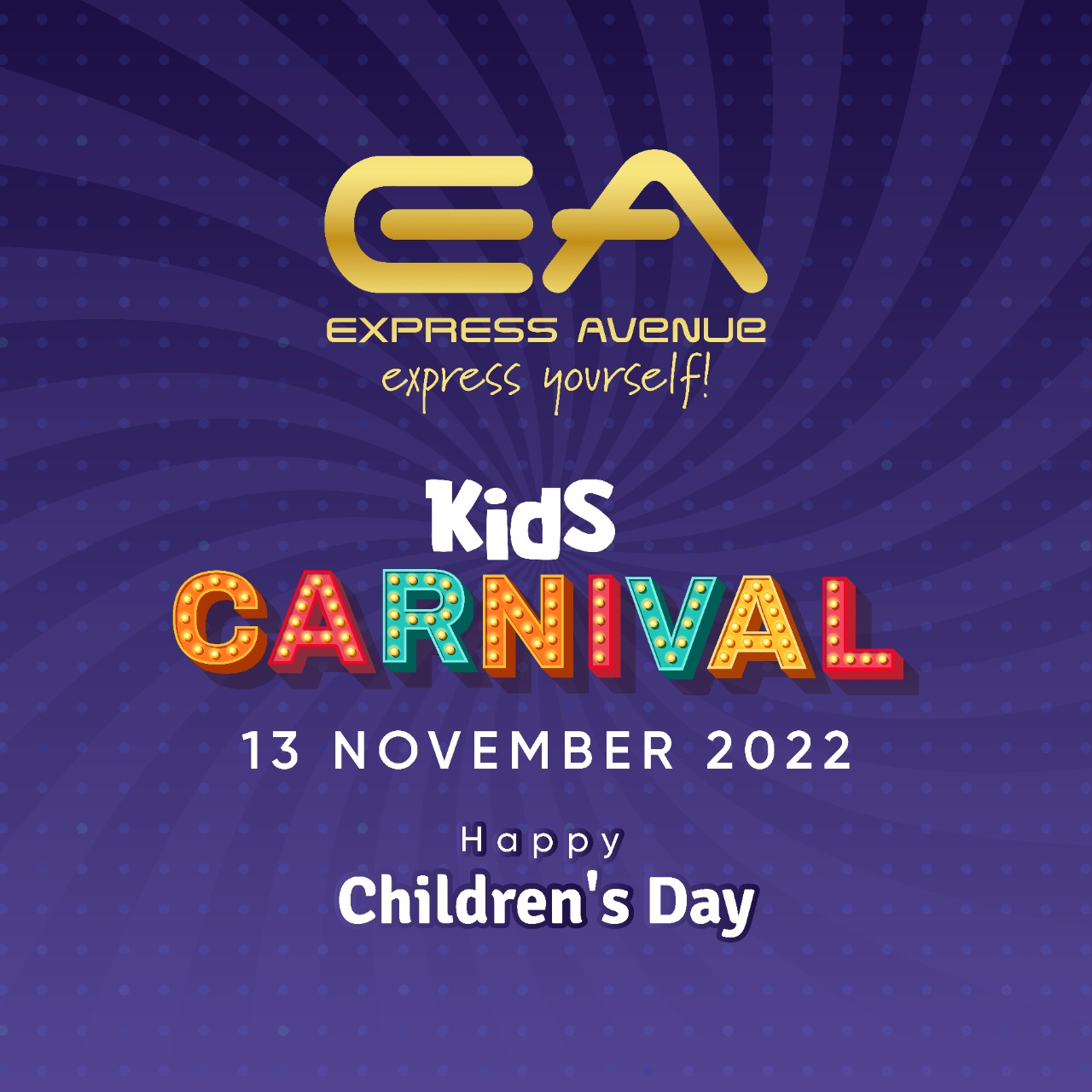
Children's Day Carnival 2022

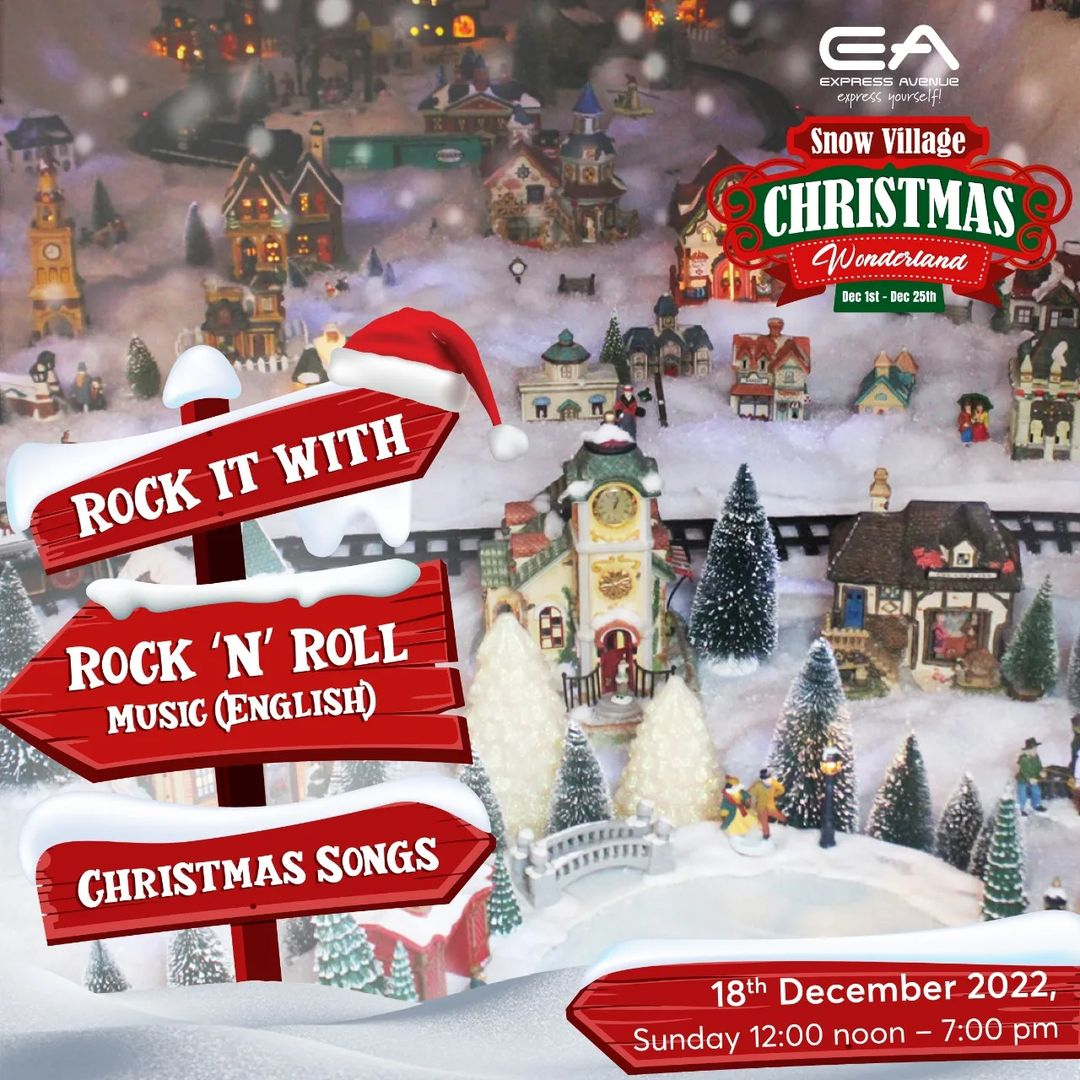
Christmas Snow Village 2022

Republic Day 2023

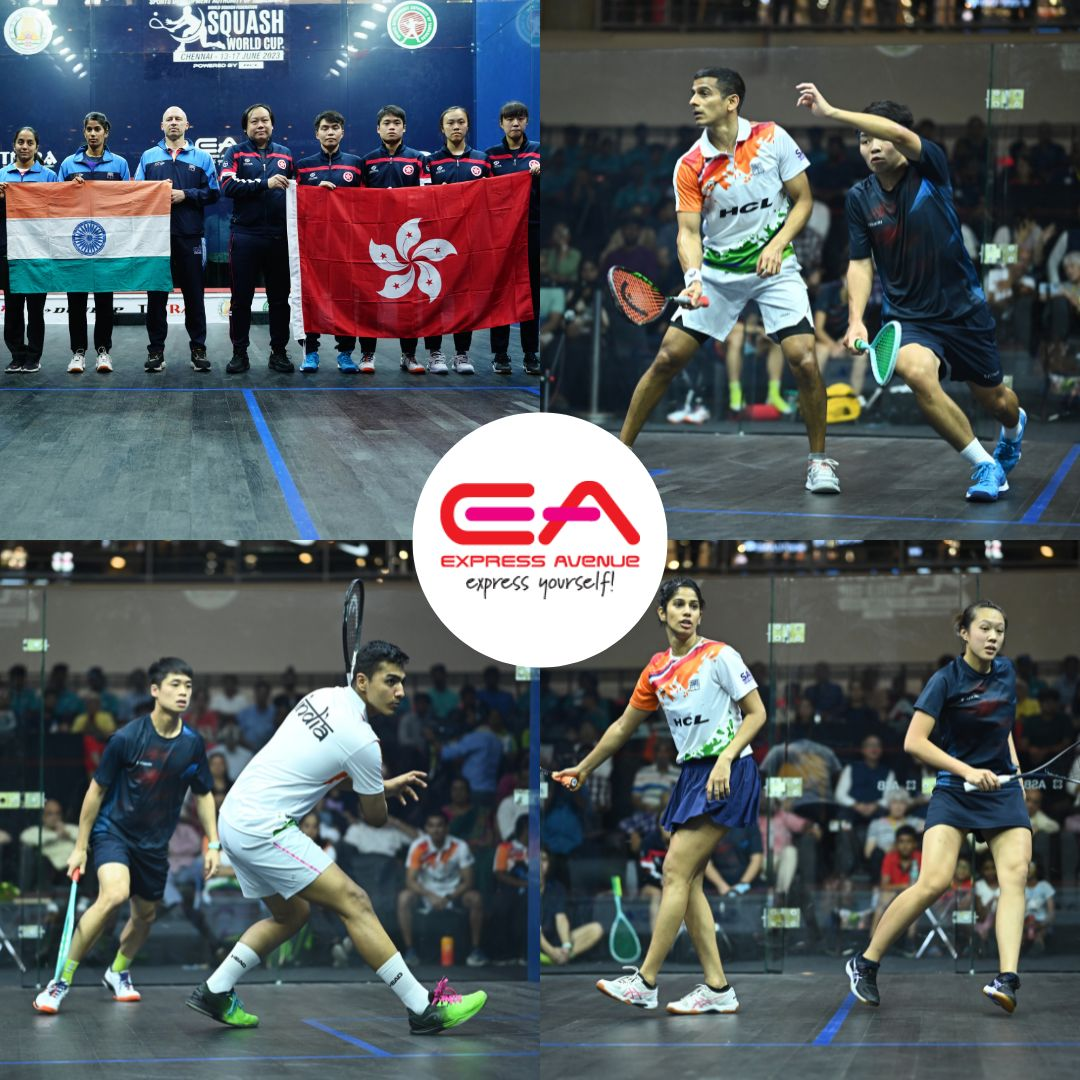
Squash World Cup 2023

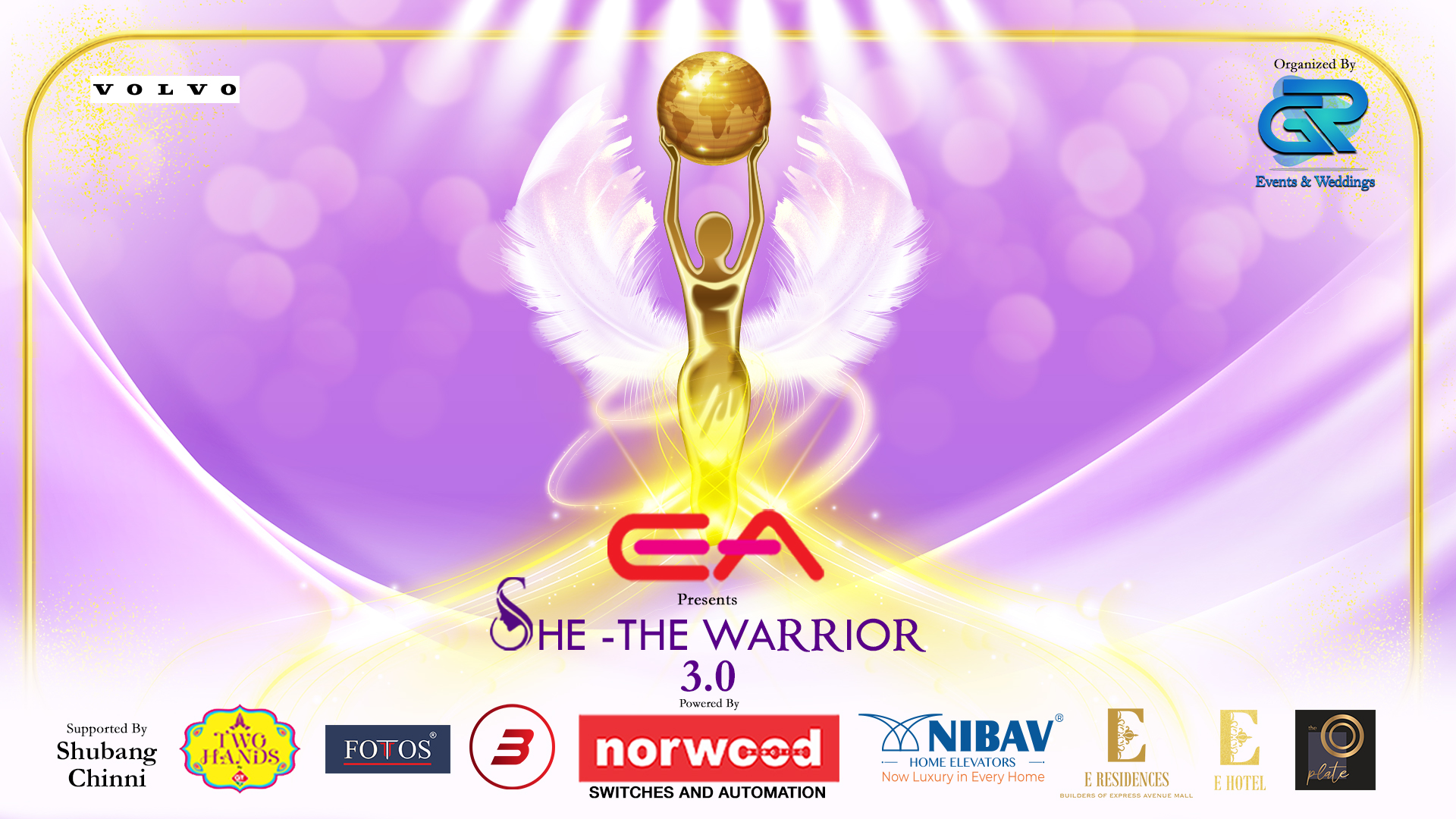
SHE - The Warrior

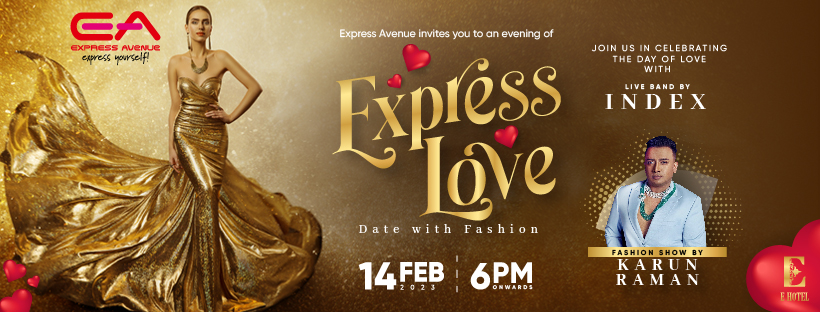
Valentine's Day 2023

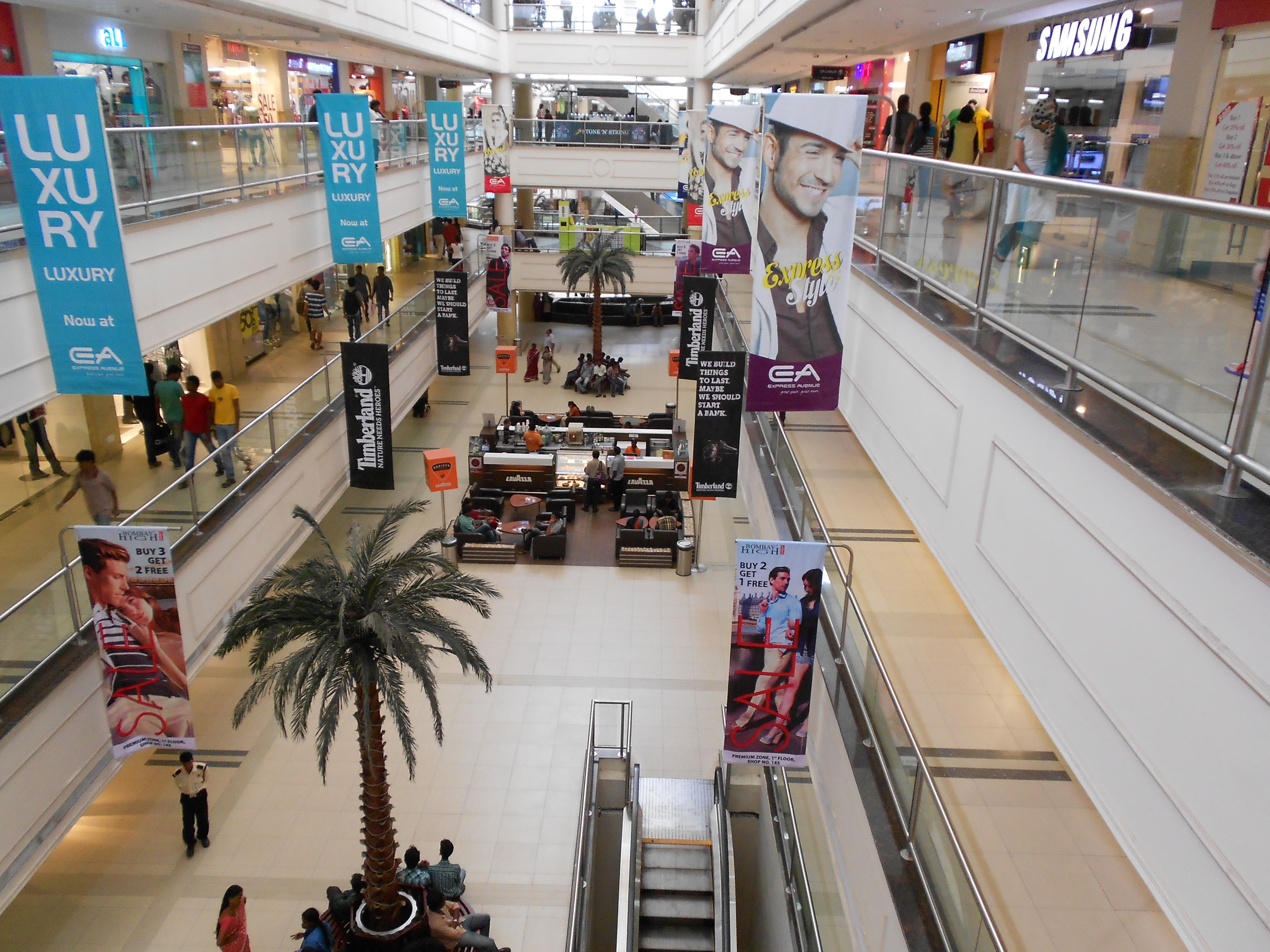
Interiors of Express Avenue

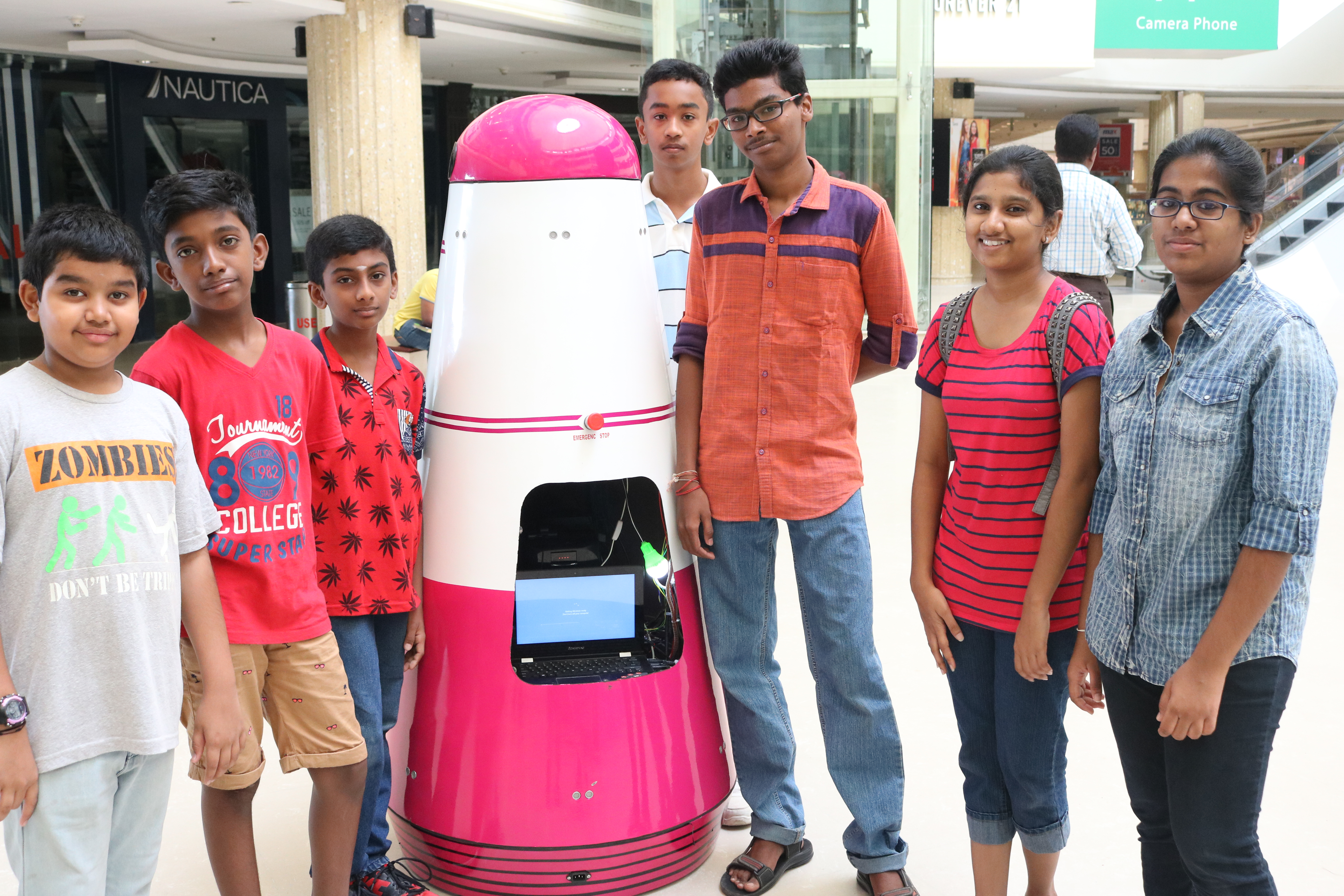
EA Bot - India's first customer assistant robot deployed in Express Avenue Chennai, Tamil Nadu

The front entrance of Express Avenue Mall

== See also ==
- Chennai Citi Centre
- Spencer Plaza
- Ampa Skywalk
- Phoenix Marketcity (Chennai)
