= Aminjikarai =

Neighbourhood in Chennai district, Tamil Nadu, India

Aminjikarai (Amaindakarai)
- Neighbourhood
- Aminjikarai(Amaindakarai)(Chennai) Aminjikarai (Amaindakarai) (Tamil Nadu) Aminjikarai (Amaindakarai) (India)
- Coordinates: 13°05′N 80°14′E
- Country: India
- State: Tamil Nadu
- District: Chennai District
- Metro: Chennai

Government
  - Body: Chennai Corporation

Languages
  - Official: Tamil
- Time zone: UTC+5:30 (IST)
- PIN: 600 029
- Vehicle registration: TN 02 (RTO, Chennai North West)
- Lok Sabha constituency: Central Chennai
- Vidhan Sabha constituency: Anna Nagar
- Planning agency: CMDA
- Civic agency: Chennai Corporation
- Website: www.chennai.tn.nic.in

Aminjikarai, originally Amaindakarai, is one of the oldest neighbourhoods in Chennai, Tamil Nadu, India. The arterial Poonamallee High Road (NH 4) runs through it. Aminjikarai was annexed to Madras District in 1946, and Arumbakkam and Anna Nagar were carved out of Aminjikarai in the 1950s and 1970s, respectively. The Nelson Manickam Road which traverses Aminjikarai is an important commercial road in Chennai city.

== History ==
A delta formed from the deposition of the sediment carried by the river Cooum towards its journey to the Bay of Bengal is called "Amainda Karai" which means Fluvial Landforms ( நீரால் உருவாக்கப்பட்ட நிலப்பரப்பு ) and later on Aminjikarai colloquially.

In the early days, it was known as a suburb after the tollgate (near Pachaiyappa's College). Now, it is a central part of Chennai which links the residential Anna Nagar to the central business district of Chennai. It comprises Mehta Nagar, Gill Nagar, Railway Colony, Collectorate Colony and Ayyavoo Naidu Colony.

Mehta Nagar is connected by a small pedestrian bridge and is almost like a peninsula. Thiru Vi Ka Park is a well-known park that is close to Aminijikarai.

== Culture ==
Aminjikarai hosts the Sri Ekambareshwara Kamakshi Amma temple and the Sri Varadaraja temple. Since these two temples are in very close vicinity, some people refer to Aminjikarai as mini Kancheepuram. The Mangali Amma temple (Ellai Amma) is also located between the toll gate and Aminjikarai. The Brahmotsavam of Ekambareshwara and Varadaraja temples is a famous festival held between March and May every year. Pradosham is also a famous event at the Ekambareshwara temple. Near the Ekambareswarar temple, there is a Vinayagar temple called "Varasidhi Vinayagar temple", well known for its Vinayagar Chathurthi festival.

Aminjikarai also has a mosque called Jamia Masjid, and a burial ground on Poonamallee High Road. There is another mosque called Fathima Islamic Cultural Society on Nelson Manickam Road. There are numerous churches as well.

== Infrastructure ==
Aminjikarai offers shopping facilities for people of all classes. The Aminjikarai Market hosts very fresh vegetables, some roadside makeshift vegetable shops offer very fresh vegetables at nominal rates. There is a huge shopping mall, Ampa Skywalk, at the intersection of Nelson Manickam Road and Poonamallee High Road. The mall has 7 multiplex cinemas, a spacious hypermarket, a food court, restaurants and branded retail outlets.

The nearest suburban railway station is Nungambakkam railway station, which is just 2 km (1.2 mi) from Aminjikarai. The proximity to the Chennai Metropolitan Bus Terminus (CMBT) has made Aminjikarai one of the most accessible routes in Chennai.

Aminjikarai has many hospitals, including Billroth Hospitals, which is a fully-fledged multi-speciality hospital. MR Hospital, a dedicated Renal (kidney) Transplant centre, is located on Govindan Street.

== In popular culture ==
Aminjikarai is usually referenced in Tamil film comedy scenes. The name is usually compared with America as a play on words to contrast someone locally from Aminjikarai with someone from a Western society.

== See also ==
- List of neighbourhoods in Chennai
