= Wesley Church, Egmore =

Wesley Church
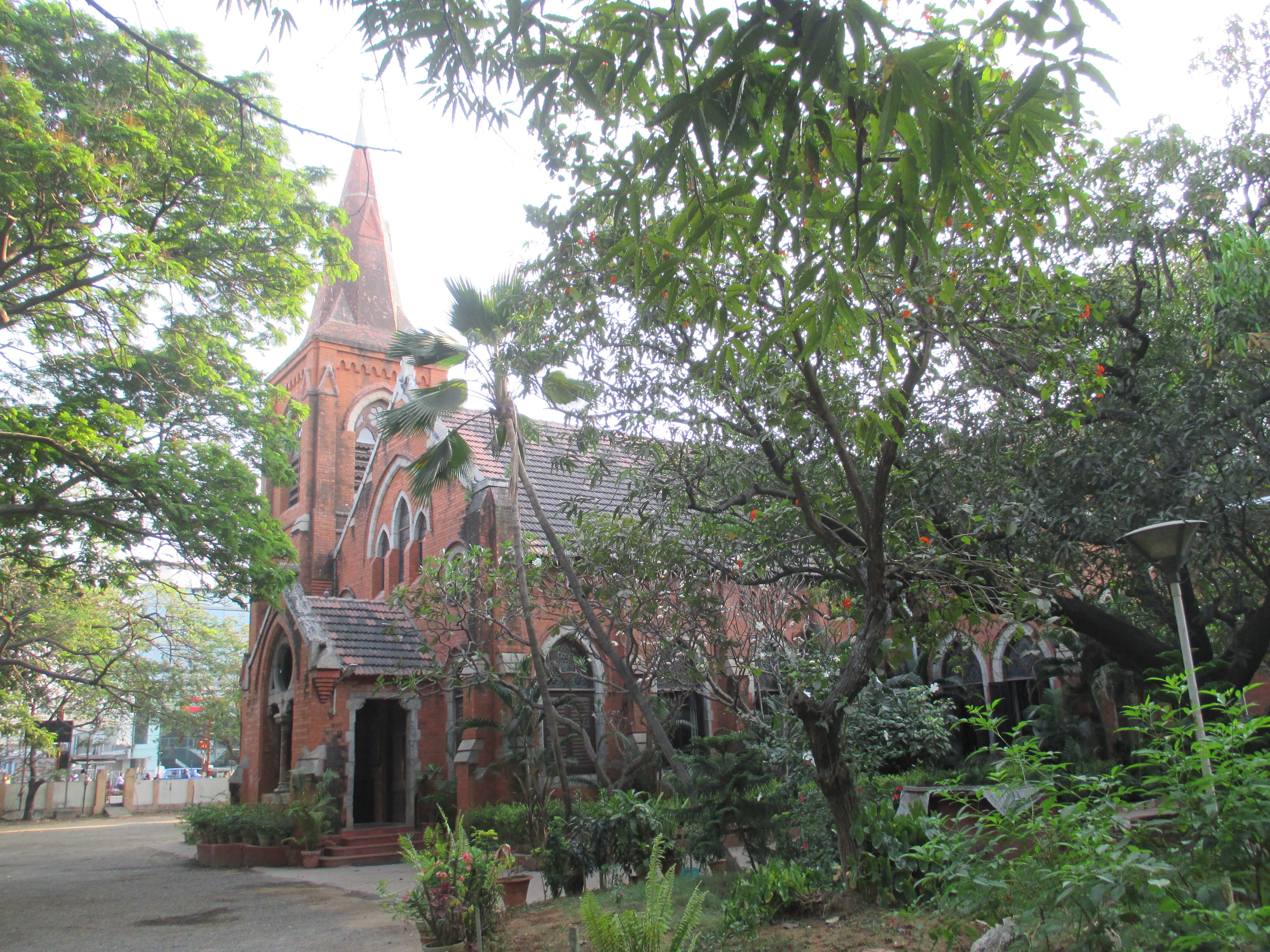
- Front view of the church

- Location within Chennai
- 13°04′46″N 80°15′24″E
- Location: Egmore, Chennai
- Country: India
- Denomination: Church of South India
- Website: egmorewesleychurch.org

History
- Founded: 1903
- Dedication: 11 February 1905

Architecture
- Functional status: Active
- Architectural type: Chapel
- Style: Gothic architecture

Administration
- Archdiocese: Diocese of Madras of the Church of South India

Wesley Church is one of the oldest churches in Egmore area of Chennai, the capital of the South Indian state of Tamil Nadu. The original structure was built in Gothic architecture in 1903 by Wesleyan Mission. It was constructed at Egmore considering the growing needs of it in the area around Egmore. The church is named after John Wesley, the founder of Methodist Movement in 140 countries.

Wesley Church is a working church with hourly prayer and daily services and follows Protestant sect of Christianity. The church also celebrates Harvest festival every year during the month of November. In modern times, it is under the dominion of Diocese of Madras of the Church of South India. It is one of the most prominent landmarks of Egmore.

== Architecture ==
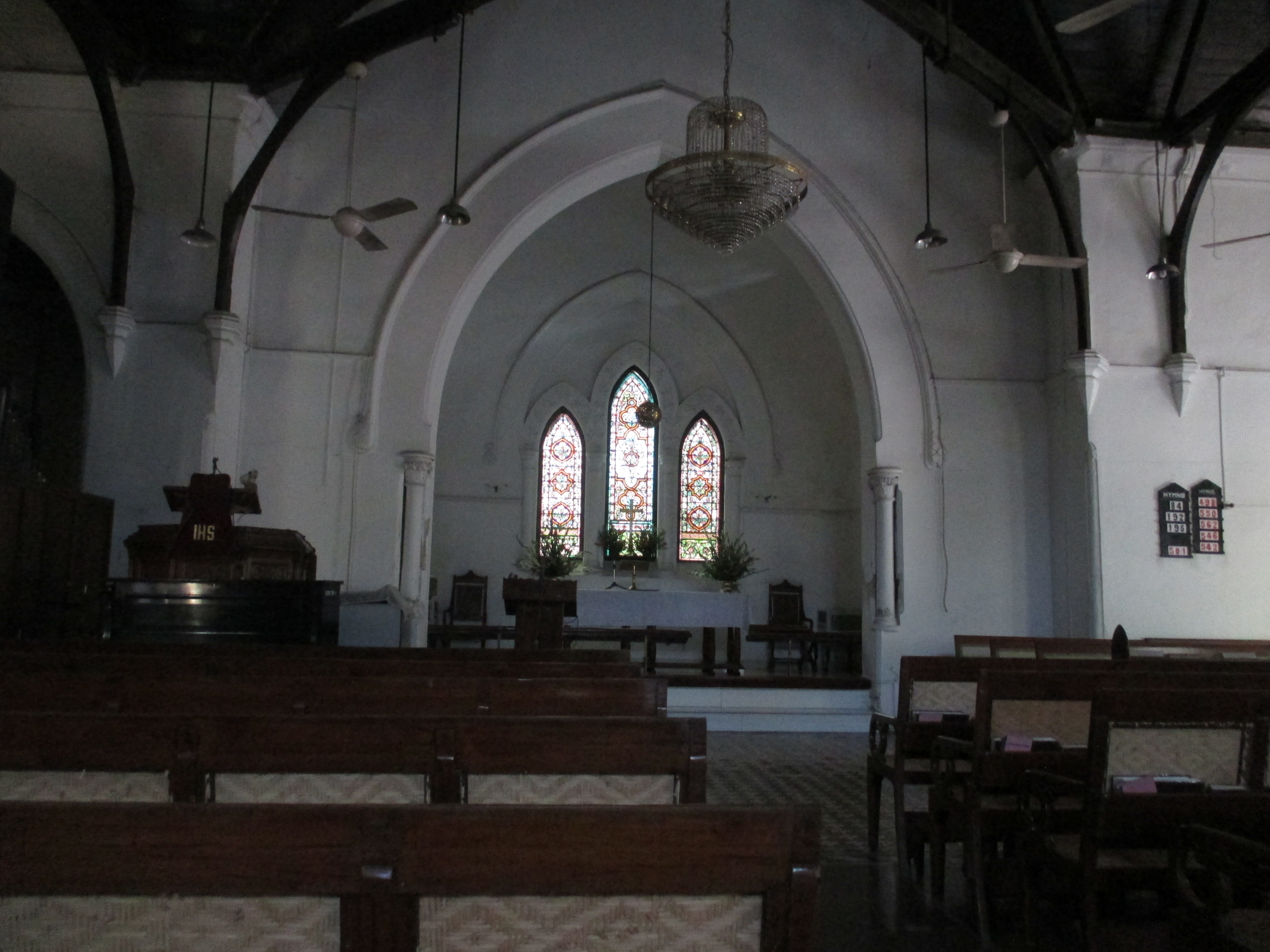
The sanctum of the church

The church is built in Gothic architecture. The site at the current place where the Church is located was originally a lotus tank. The tank was filled up during the early day of settlement of Rev. John Breedan from 1892 when the land was purchased. The pipe organ used by the church is of important note and is one of the oldest instruments still in use. The church has an exterior made of brick, stained glass windows and tiled brick spire. The altar houses conventional Methodist images and a prayer hall for the devotees. The plaques of Wesley and Jesus Christ are housed in glass chambers in standing posture on the walls facing the devotees There is a school and institutions belonging to the Church located within the compound.

== History ==
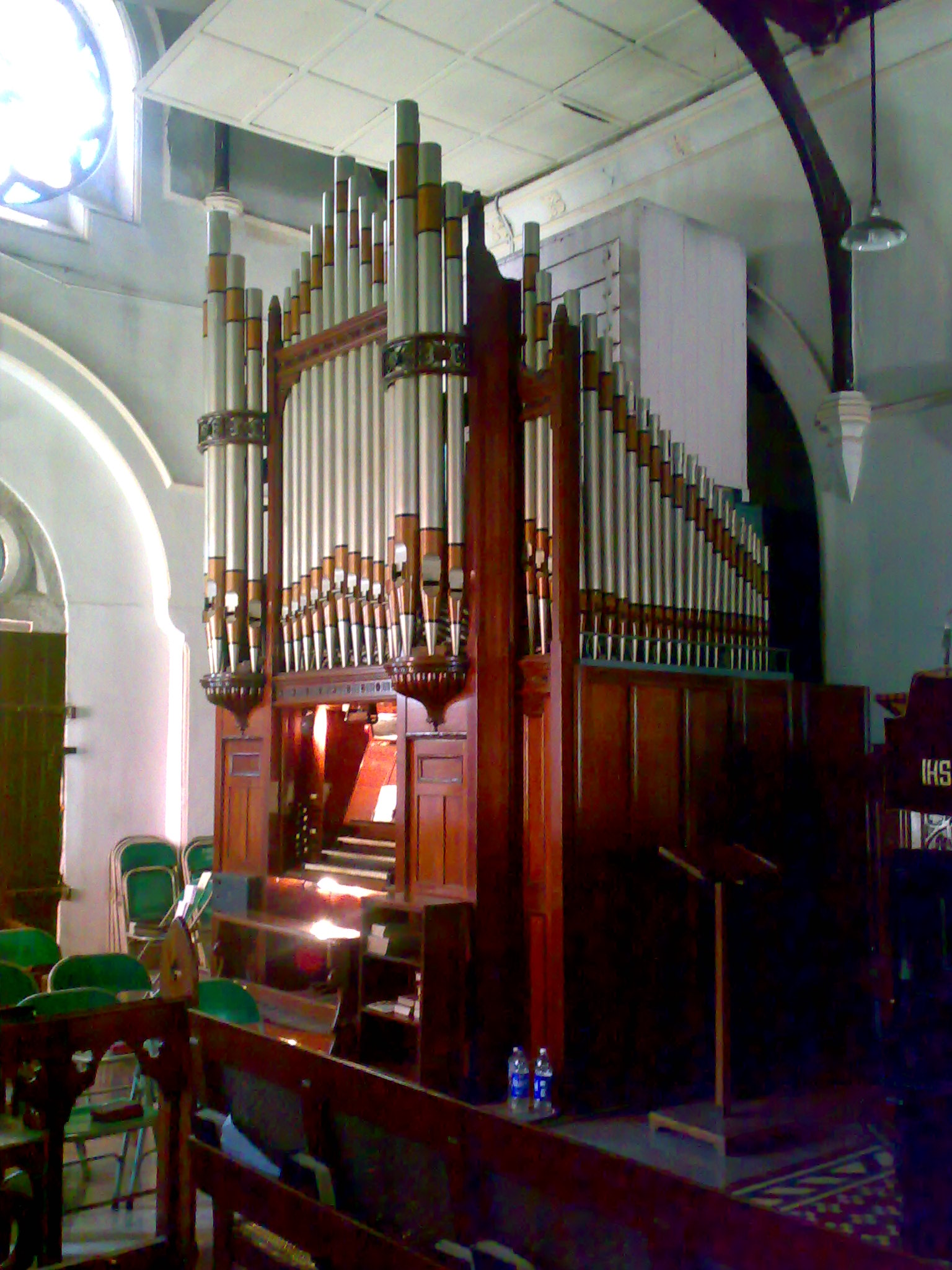
Pipe organ used in the church

The church was named after John Wesley, the founder of Methodist movement in 140 countries. Protestant missions in India were legalised by an act of British Parliament in 1813. The mission to India and Ceylon was initiated with five members. The Madras mission was established in 1817, with Royapettah as the headquarters. During the later period of the 19th century, the need was felt to expand in regions like Egmore and Perambur. During 1892, the Garden House in Poonamalle High Road was purchased for the pastor of the English group. Rev. John Breedan, who was the first to occupy the premises with the lotus tank in front of it worked towards the foundation of the church. The foundation of the Church was laid on 28 December 1903 with the filling of lotus tank on Poonamalle High Road in Egmore by Prof. George G. Findlay and his fellow missionaries of the Wesleyan Mission. The church was formally inaugurated on 11 February 1905 by Rev. J.Cooling and the formal message of opening the church was announced by Rev. William H. Findlay. The centenary celebrations of the Church was celebrated on 29 January 2005, with special lectures and fundraising events.

== Worship practices ==
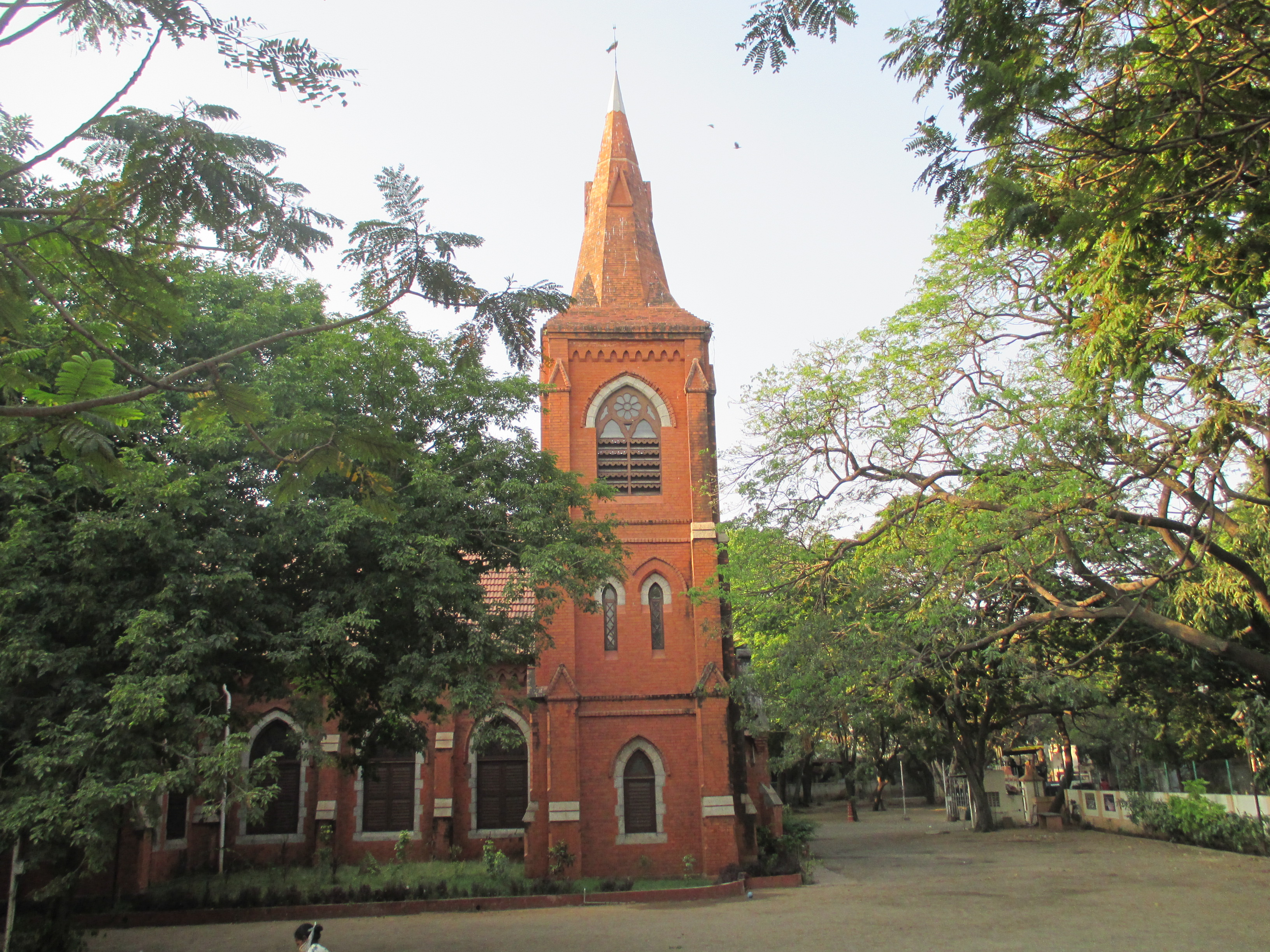
A view from the main road

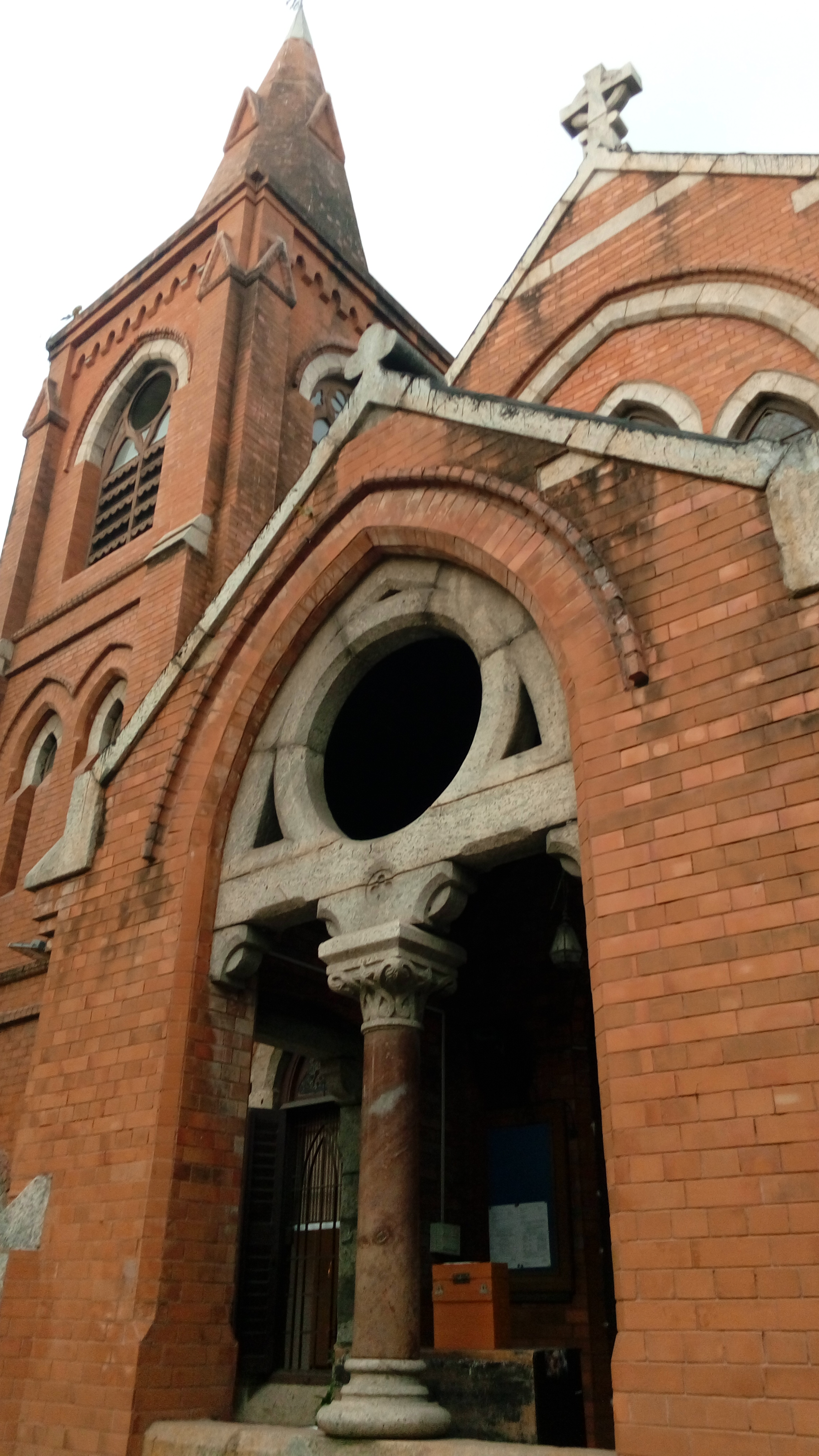
Entrance to the church

The priests in the church were originally only English, but during modern times, Tamil people were also allowed. In modern times, the Church is administered by the Diocese of Madras of the Church of South India. Mass is performed in the church from Monday to Friday on 8 a.m., 8:30 a.m. and 5 p.m. on Saturdays and 8:30 a.m. and 6 p.m. on Sundays. The festival of the temple is celebrated during the Christmas times for eight days, starting with flag hoisting on 24 December and ending with a feast and religious lectures on 2 January. The Church has a home for mentally challenged named Parivalaya; the annual festivals are conducted along with the institution. Harvest festival is celebrated in the church as a thanksgiving day every year during the month of November. In association with humanitarian institutions, rice, cereal, vegetables and oil are donated to the socially backward people of the society. The festival is considered one of the primary stipulations from the Old Testament, which emphasises gratitude to society.
