= Gold Souk Grande Mall Chennai =

Shopping mall in Chennai, India

Gold Souk Grande, Chennai
- Location: Chennai, India
- Coordinates: 12.876661°N 80.079968°E
- Address: GST Road, Vandalur, Chennai
- Opened: 2015
- Developer: Aerens Gold Souk Group
- Floor area: 600,000 sq ft (56,000 m^{2})
- Website: Gold Souk Grande Mall

Gold Souk Grandé is a shopping mall, in the city of Chennai, India. The project was unveiled in April 2009 by actress Shobana. It is located next to Crescent Engineering College in Chennai and will be operational by first quarter of 2015. This is creating a record for itself by becoming the longest project in gestation period and construction period. Spread in the total built up area of 800,000 sq ft (74,000 m^{2}), the mall will have five floors with gross leasable (retail) area of 600,000 sq ft (56,000 m^{2}) dedicated to hypermarket, anchors, vanilla brands, multiplex, food court, QSR and Ramada Hotel.

The mall is part of the Gold Souk chain of malls located throughout India and is a brand of Gurgaon-based retail and property developer, Aerens Gold Souk Group. The Gold Souk Grande Chennai is Arena Group's first venture in Tamil Nadu. The case has finally been won by the investors who were the buyers of the shops in this mall. After various legal hurdles the honorable chief justice has told the mall developers to give the money back to the buyers of the shop. The district collector has been ordered to auction this property. IN THE HIGH COURT OF JUDICATURE AT MADRAS

DATED: 08.10.2026

CORAM :

THE HONOURABLE MR. SUSHRUT ARVIND DHARMADHIKARI,

CHIEF JUSTICE

AND

THE HONOURABLE MR.JUSTICE G.ARUL MURUGAN

WA No. 2687 of 2024

CNR:{HCMA011096052024}

WA No. 2688 of 2024

CNR:{HCMA011096042024}

WA No. 2690 of 2024

CNR:{HCMA011096072024}

WA No. 2691 of 2024

CNR:{HCMA011096062024}

and

CMP Nos.19488, 19465, 19483, 19463 of 2024; 23045 of 2025

and

CMP Nos.23818, 23813, 23810, 23750, 23773, 23774, 23755 of 2024

and 1513 of 2026

W.A.No.2687 of 2024:

1.M/s.Sage Properties Private Limited

Rep. by its Authorised Signatory,

Plot No.1, No.1 Wedding Souk,

Local Shopping Centre,

Sharda Niketan, Pitampura,

New Delhi - 110 034.

______________

Page 1 of 12

https://www.mhc.tn.gov.in/judis ( Uploaded on: 12/10/2026 06:26:53 pm )W.A.No.2687 of 2024 etc.

2.M/s.Saga Motels Private Ltd.,

Rep. by its Authorised Signatory,

Plot No.1, No.1 Wedding Souk,

Local Shopping Centre,

Sharda Niketan, Pitampura,

New Delhi - 110 034.

3.M/s.Sage Buildwell Private Ltd

Rep. by its Authorised Signatory,

Plot No.1, No.1 Wedding Souk,

Local Shopping Centre,

Sharda Niketan, Pitampura,

New Delhi - 110 034.

4.M/s Grand Buildcon Private Ltd

Rep. by its Authorised Signatory,

No.A-15, 1st Floor, Annexe Main,

Hauz Khas, New Delhi - 110 016.

Appellants

Vs

1.The District Collector

Chengalpet, Chengalpet District.

2.The Tahsildar

Vandalur, Chengalpet District.

3.R.Mithun Chakravarthy

Plot No.25, Maharajapuram Main Road,

Santhosapuram, Chennai 600 073

4.M/s.Metroline Promotors Pvt Ltd

Plot No.1 Local Shopping Centre,

ShardaNiketan, Pitampura,

New Delhi - 110 034.

Respondents

______________

Page 2 of 12

https://www.mhc.tn.gov.in/judis ( Uploaded on: 12/10/2026 06:26:53 pm )W.A.No.2687 of 2024 etc.

W.A.No.2688 of 2024:

1.M/s.Sage Properties Private Limited

Rep. by its Authorised Signatory,

Plot No.1, No.1 Wedding Souk,

Local Shopping Centre,

Sharda Niketan, Pitampura,

New Delhi - 110 034.

2.M/s.Saga Motels Private Ltd.,

Rep. by its Authorised Signatory,

Plot No.1, No.1 Wedding Souk,

Local Shopping Centre,

Sharda Niketan, Pitampura,

New Delhi - 110 034.

3.M/s.Sage Buildwell Private Ltd

Rep. by its Authorised Signatory,

Plot No.1, No.1 Wedding Souk,

Local Shopping Centre,

Sharda Niketan, Pitampura,

New Delhi - 110 034.

4.M/s Grand Buildcon Private Ltd

Rep. by its Authorised Signatory,

No.A-15, 1st Floor, Annexe Main,

Hauz Khas, New Delhi - 110 016.

Appellants

Vs

1.The District Collector

Chengalpet, Chengalpet District.

2.The Tahsildar

Vandalur, Chengalpet District.

______________

Page 3 of 12

https://www.mhc.tn.gov.in/judis ( Uploaded on: 12/10/2026 06:26:53 pm )W.A.No.2687 of 2024 etc.

3.R.Lavanya Prasad

Door No.34, Anna Street,

Chitlapakkam, Chennai-600 064

4.M/s.Metroline Promotors Pvt Ltd

Plot No.1 Local Shopping Centre,

ShardaNiketan, Pitampura,

New Delhi - 110 034.

Respondents

W.A.No.2690 of 2024:

1.M/s.Sage Properties Private Limited

Rep. by its Authorised Signatory,

Plot No.1, No.1 Wedding Souk,

Local Shopping Centre,

Sharda Niketan, Pitampura,

New Delhi - 110 034.

2.M/s.Saga Motels Private Ltd.,

Rep. by its Authorised Signatory,

Plot No.1, No.1 Wedding Souk,

Local Shopping Centre,

Sharda Niketan, Pitampura,

New Delhi - 110 034.

3.M/s.Sage Buildwell Private Ltd

Rep. by its Authorised Signatory,

Plot No.1, No.1 Wedding Souk,

Local Shopping Centre,

Sharda Niketan, Pitampura,

New Delhi - 110 034.

4.M/s Grand Buildcon Private Ltd

Rep. by its Authorised Signatory,

No.A-15, 1st Floor, Annexe Main,

Hauz Khas, New Delhi - 110 016.

Appellants

______________

Page 4 of 12

https://www.mhc.tn.gov.in/judis ( Uploaded on: 12/10/2026 06:26:53 pm )W.A.No.2687 of 2024 etc.

Vs

1.The District Collector

Chengalpet, Chengalpet District.

2.The Tahsildar

Vandalur, Chengalpet District.

3.Dr.A.Joseph Stanley

No.6, Paul Vector Street

Nehru Nagar, Chrompet

Chennai-600 044

4.S.J.S. Thamarai Selvi

No.6, Paul Vector Street

Nehru Nagar, Chrompet

Chennai-600 044

5.M/s.Metroline Promotors Pvt Ltd

Plot No.1 Local Shopping Centre,

ShardaNiketan, Pitampura,

New Delhi - 110 034.

Respondents

W.A.No.2691 of 2024:

1.M/s.Sage Properties Private Limited

Rep. by its Authorised Signatory,

Plot No.1, No.1 Wedding Souk,

Local Shopping Centre,

Sharda Niketan, Pitampura,

New Delhi - 110 034.

2.M/s.Saga Motels Private Ltd.,

Rep. by its Authorised Signatory,

Plot No.1, No.1 Wedding Souk,

Local Shopping Centre,

Sharda Niketan, Pitampura,

New Delhi - 110 034.

______________

Page 5 of 12

https://www.mhc.tn.gov.in/judis ( Uploaded on: 12/10/2026 06:26:53 pm )W.A.No.2687 of 2024 etc.

3.M/s.Sage Buildwell Private Ltd

Rep. by its Authorised Signatory,

Plot No.1, No.1 Wedding Souk,

Local Shopping Centre,

Sharda Niketan, Pitampura,

New Delhi - 110 034.

4.M/s Grand Buildcon Private Ltd

Rep. by its Authorised Signatory,

No.A-15, 1st Floor, Annexe Main,

Hauz Khas, New Delhi - 110 016.

Appellants

Vs

1.The District Collector

Chengalpet, Chengalpet District.

2.The Tahsildar

Vandalur, Chengalpet District.

3.Latha Manikandan

TF 13/14, RKC Suprabath

Kumaran Colony

7th Street, Vadapalani

Chennai-600 042

4.M/s.Metroline Promotors Pvt Ltd

Plot No.1 Local Shopping Centre,

ShardaNiketan, Pitampura,

New Delhi - 110 034.

Respondents

PRAYER : Appeals filed under Clause 15 of the Letters Patent to set

aside the order passed by the learned Single Judge in W.P.Nos.19779,

______________

Page 6 of 12

https://www.mhc.tn.gov.in/judis ( Uploaded on: 12/10/2026 06:26:53 pm )W.A.No.2687 of 2024 etc.

19785, 19788 and 19791 of 2023, dated 25.04.2024.

For Appellants: Mr.Rahul M Shankar

For Respondents: Mr.M.Roshan Atiq

Addl. Government Pleader

for R1 & R2 in all appeals

Mr.V.Manohar

for R3 in all appeals

COMMON JUDGMENT

(Delivered by G.Arul Murugan, J.)

These intra-Court appeals assail the common order dated

W.P.Nos.19779, 19785, 19788 and 19791 of

25.4.2024 passed in 2023.

2. Heard learned counsel for the appellants; learned

Additional Government Pleader for respondent Nos.1 and 2 and

learned counsel for respondent No.3.

3. Applications came to be filed before the Adjudicating

Authority under Real Estate (Regulatory and Development) Act,

2016 [for short, “the Act”] complaining certain deficiencies.

______________

Page 7 of 12

https://www.mhc.tn.gov.in/judis ( Uploaded on: 12/10/2026 06:26:53 pm )W.A.No.2687 of 2024 etc.

Admittedly, the Adjudicating Authority considered the issue and has

passed separate orders on 13.12.2019, 27.12.2019, 25.02.2020,

28.02.2020, 25.03.2021 and 10.11.2022, respectively, on the

complaints filed by the aggrieved persons. In compliance with the

orders passed by the Adjudicating Authority, the District Collector

had initiated steps under the Revenue Recovery Act. The

proceedings initiated by the District Collector, Chengalpet, dated

11.3.2022, under the Revenue Recovery Act were assailed by the

appellants before the Writ Court.

4. The sole ground of challenge was that the appellants were

not made parties before the Adjudicating Authority and, in such

circumstances and in view of the gross violation of the elementary

principles of natural justice, they are entitled to challenge the

proceedings of the District Collector initiated under the Recovery

Recovery Act.

5. The learned Single Judge, while considering the issue

raised, concluded that when there is an appellate remedy available

to assail the orders passed by the Adjudicating Authority before the

______________

Page 8 of 12

https://www.mhc.tn.gov.in/judis ( Uploaded on: 12/10/2026 06:26:53 pm )W.A.No.2687 of 2024 etc.

Appellate Tribunal, the challenge made only to the consequential

proceedings initiated by the District Collector under the Revenue

Recovery Act in compliance with the order of the Adjudicating

Authority is not maintainable and dismissed the writ petitions.

6. As per the scheme of the Act, an aggrieved person can

make an application before the Adjudicating Authority and if any

final orders are passed by the Adjudicating Authority, any person

aggrieved can file an appeal before the Appellate Tribunal under

Section 44 of the Act. The Act further provides remedy of appeal to

this Court under Section 58 of the Act. When the scheme of the Act

provides the remedy of appeal to any person aggrieved by an order

passed by the Adjudicating Authority, the appellants are entitled to

file appeal by raising all these issues before the statutory Appellate

Tribunal constituted under the Act. Admittedly, no such appeal has

been filed by the appellants before the Appellate Tribunal.

7. Since no appellate proceedings were taken, the orders

passed by the Adjudicating Authority were executed by the District

Collector by taking appropriate proceedings under the Revenue

______________

Page 9 of 12

https://www.mhc.tn.gov.in/judis ( Uploaded on: 12/10/2026 06:26:53 pm )W.A.No.2687 of 2024 etc.

Recovery Act. The appellants have only challenged the

consequential proceedings in the writ petitions without making a

challenge to the orders passed by the Adjudicating Authority before

the Appellate Tribunal. In such circumstances, the learned Single

Judge rightly held that the challenge made to the consequential

proceedings of the District Collector, without a challenge to the

orders of the Adjudicating Authority before the Appellate Tribunal, is

not sustainable and dismissed the writ petitions.

8. For the foregoing reasons, we find no error in the finding

arrived at by the learned Single Judge. We leave it open to the

appellants to file appropriate statutory appeals, if so advised. If any

appeal is filed, the appellants would be entitled to seek exclusion of

the time which was spent before this Court for the purpose of

reckoning limitation. Accordingly, the writ appeals are dismissed.

There shall be no order as to costs. Consequently, CMP

Nos.19488, 19465, 19483, 19463 of 2024; 23045 of 2025 are

closed.

______________

Page 10 of 12

https://www.mhc.tn.gov.in/judis ( Uploaded on: 12/10/2026 06:26:53 pm )W.A.No.2687 of 2024 etc.

In view of the dismissal of the appeals, CMP Nos.23818,

23813, 23810, 23750, 23773, 23774, 23755 of 2024 and 1513 of

2026 filed to implead the respective petitioners as respondents in

W.A.No.2687 of 2024 are closed.

(SUSHRUT ARVIND DHARMADHIKARI, CJ) (G.ARUL MURUGAN,J)

08.10.2026

Index : Yes/No

Neutral Citation : Yes/No

bbr

To:

1.The District Collector

Chengalpet, Chengalpet District.

2.The Tahsildar

Vandalur, Chengalpet District.
