= Chennai Citi Centre =

Shopping mall in Chennai, India

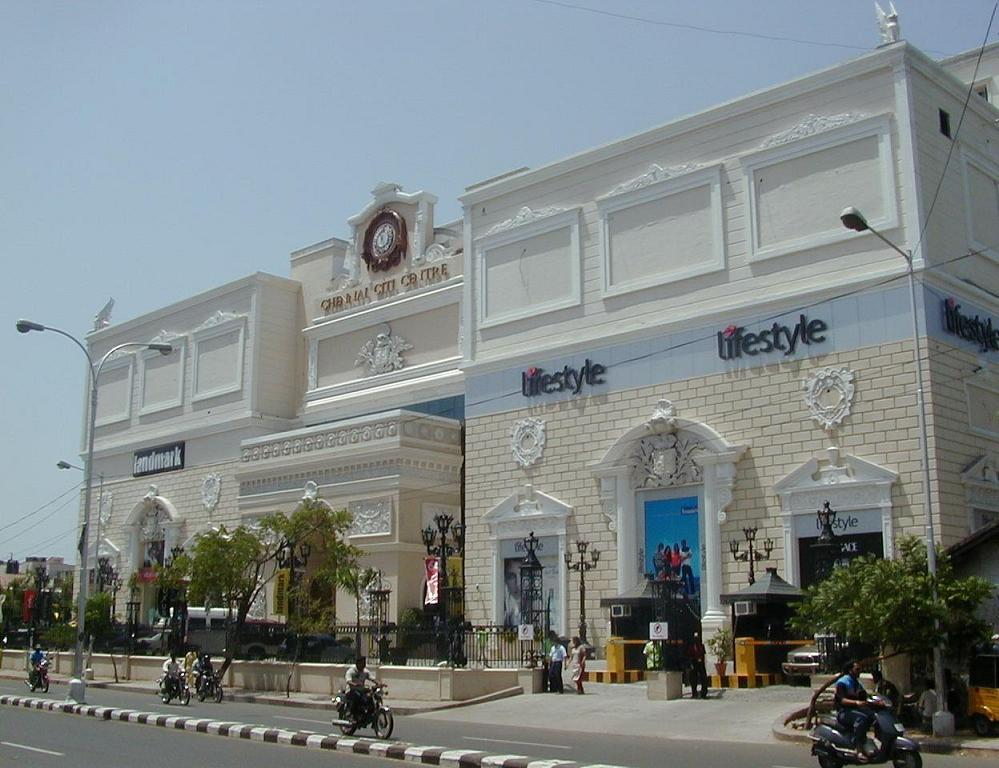
- Location: Mylapore, Chennai, India
- Coordinates: 13°2′34.4544″N 80°16′26.14″E
- Opened: 3 March 2006
- Developer: Buhari Group
- Manager: Chennai Citi Centre Holdings (P) Ltd.
- Owner: Chennai Citi Centre Holdings (P) Ltd.
- Num. of stores: 50 shops, 25 dining establishments
- Num. of anchor tenants: 9
- Floor area: 150,000 sq ft (14,000 m^{2})
- Floors: 5
- Parking: 500 cars
- Website: chennaiciticenter.com

The Chennai Citi Centre is a shopping mall in Mylapore, Chennai, India. It opened on 3 March 2006 and is located on Radhakrishnan Salai. According to Cushman and Wakefield, a global real estate consultancy firm, it is one of the most expensive shopping malls in Chennai.
