= Spencer Plaza =

Shopping mall in Chennai, India

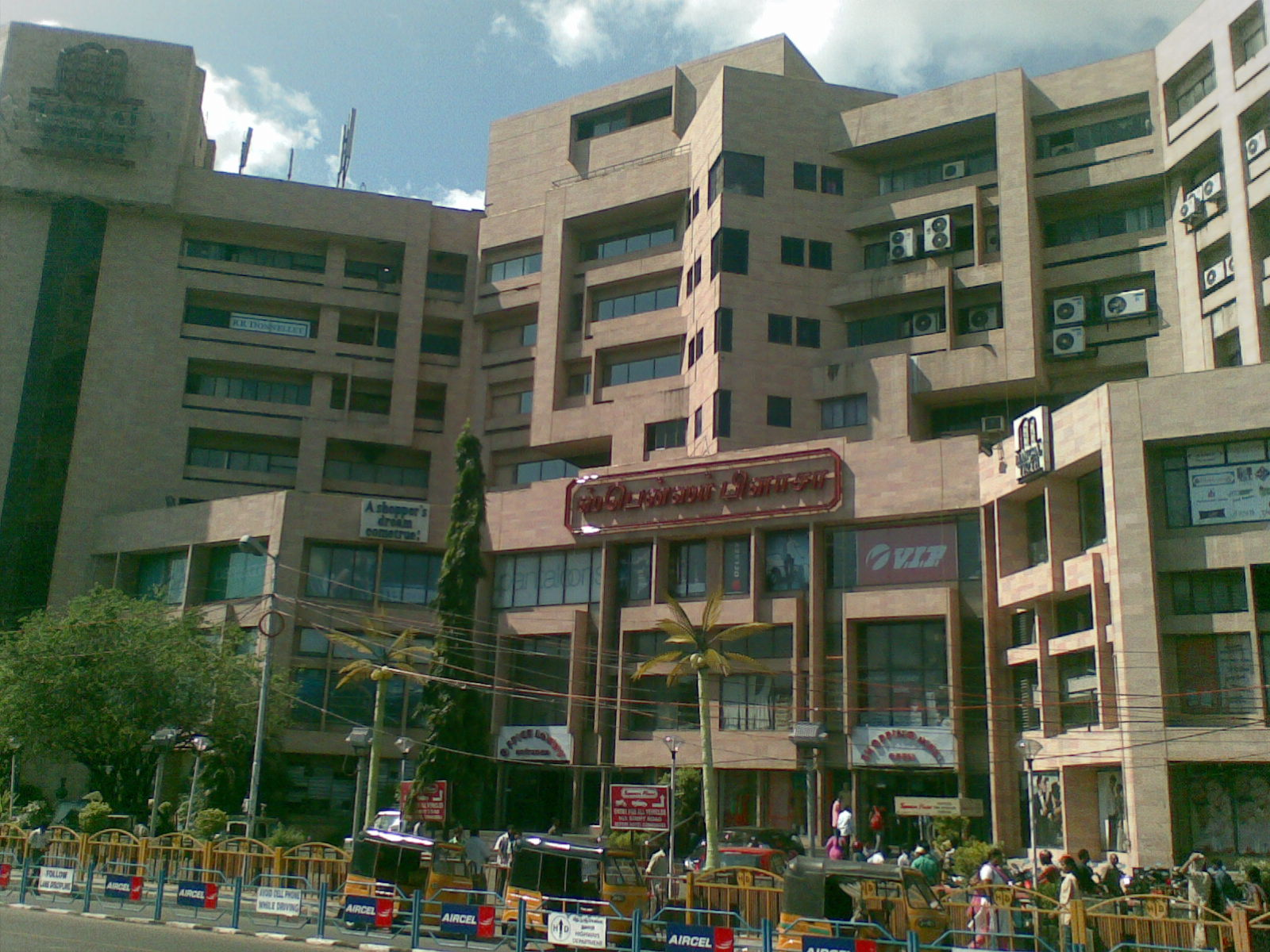
- Spencer Plaza, a prominent landmark of Chennai

General information
- Type: Shopping mall and commercial offices
- Architectural style: Modernism
- Location: Anna Salai, Chennai, India, 769, Anna Salai, Chennai, Tamil Nadu 600 002, India
- Coordinates: 13.061°N 80.261°E
- Construction started: 1863

Technical details
- Floor count: 8
- Floor area: 530,000 sq ft (49,000 m^{2})

Design and construction
- Architects: C.R. Narayana Rao & Co
- Developer: Mangal Tirth
- Main contractor: Tarapore & Co

Spencer Plaza (Tamil: ஸ்பென்சர் பிளாசா) is a shopping mall located on Anna Salai in Chennai, Tamil Nadu, India, and is one of the modern landmarks of the city. Originally built during the period of the British Raj and reconstructed in 1985 on the site of the original Spencer's department store, it is the oldest shopping mall in India and was one of the biggest shopping malls in South Asia when it was built. It is one of the earliest Grade A commercial projects of the city, which were developed in the second half of the 1990s. As of March 2010, it is the 11th largest mall in the country, with a gross leasable (retail) area of 530,000 sq ft.

== History ==
Spencer Plaza was built in 1863–1864, established by Charles Durant and J. W. Spencer in Anna Salai, then known as Mount Road, in the Madras Presidency. The property originally belonged to Spencer & Co Ltd. Spencer & Co opened the first department store in the Indian subcontinent in 1895. It had over 80 individual departments. After a few years, Eugene Oakshott, owner of Spencer's, shifted the department store to a new building, which was an example of Indo-Saracenic style of architecture. The building was designed by W. N. Pogson. In 1983, the original building was destroyed in a fire.

The present Spencer Plaza was constructed on the same site, measuring about 10 acres, and was opened in 1991. Spread across a million square feet built in three phases with parking space for 800 cars, the plaza is a major hangout for the people of Chennai. The mall was developed by Mangal Tirth Estate Limited in January 1993.

== Building ==
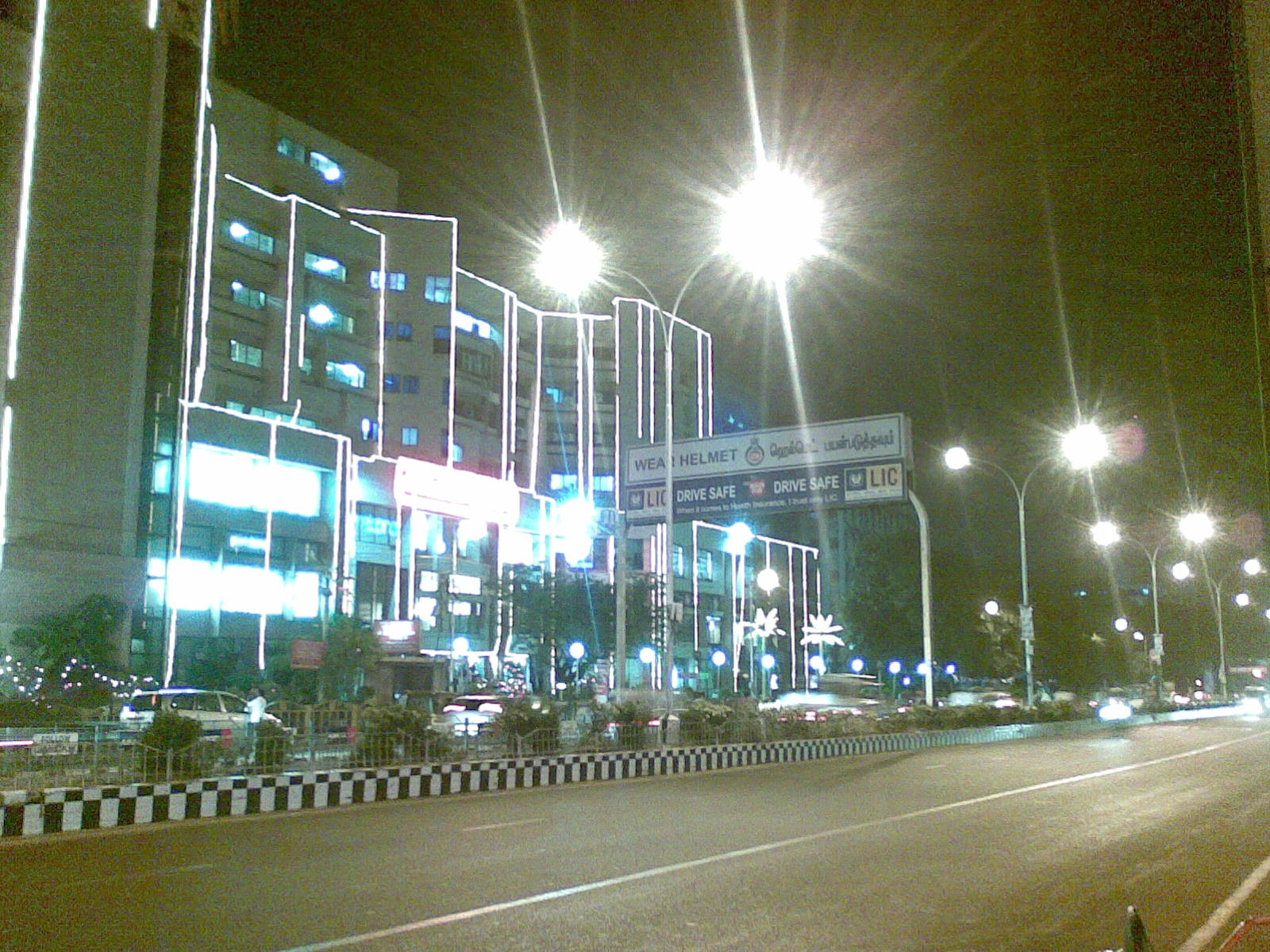
Spencer Plaza at night

The plaza is an eight-storey shopping-cum-office complex of approximately 1.068 million sq ft, consisting of nearly 600,000 square feet (56,000 m^{2}) of air-conditioned shopping units and 400,000 square feet (37,000 m^{2}) of office units. The shopping arcade is located on the ground, first and second floors in all three phases, and the office units are spread between the fourth and the seventh floors. The car parks are spread over the basement, ground, second and third floors, in addition to double basement parking lots in the third phase of the building.

The first phase of the building consists of about 300,000 sq ft, including about 125,000 sq ft of centrally air-conditioned shopping space and 100,000 sq ft of office units together with about 75,000 sq ft of service areas. The second phase consists of about 400,000 sq ft, with a provision for about 600 cars at the basement, with shops with various sizes ranging from 300 sq ft to 2,000 sq ft. The third phase covers another 300,000 sq ft. The theme of the third phase is based on colonnaded structure recreating the old Spencer's around a full-height atrium.

There are over 700 shops in the plaza and over 22,000 people visit the plaza every day, with the number increasing to 40,000 on weekends and to 60,000 on festival days. The complex has three counters to keep track of footfalls. Over 20,000 two-wheelers check into the parking lot on weekends.

=== Technical and safety aspects ===
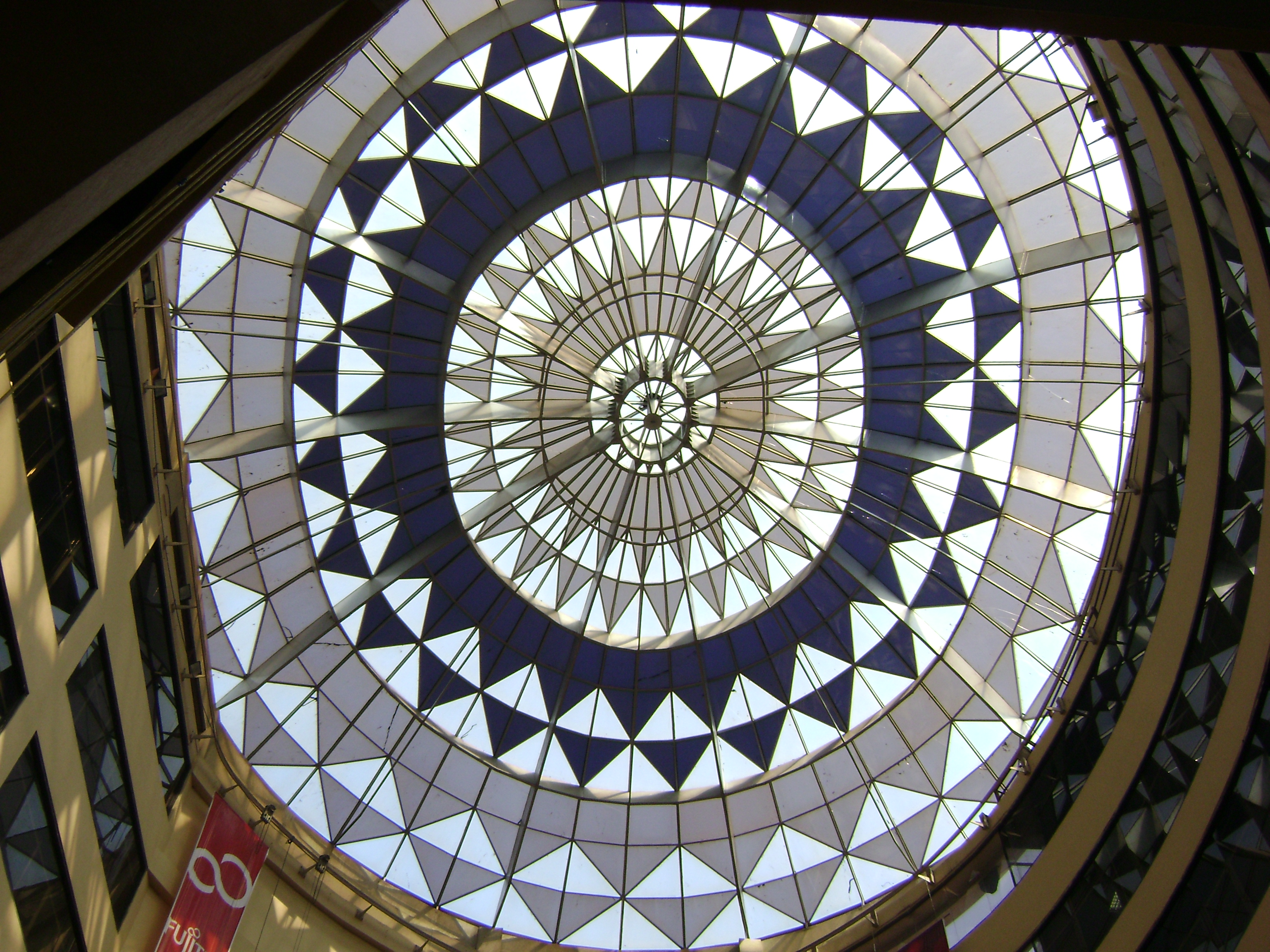
Glass roof in the third phase of the mall

Being a high-rise building, the complex has a wet riser system and electronic fire alarm system installed. The underground sump has a storage capacity of 100,000 litres (22,000 imp gal; 26,000 US gal). A ring main surrounds the building from the pump room. Five wet risers run from basement to the second floor and three run from the fourth floor to the seventh floor. These risers are located at strategic points in each floor. The pump room has three pumps, one jockey pump, one main pump with an electric motor and one main pump connected with a diesel engine. The electronic fire detection system comprises smoke detectors and manual call points located in various points in common areas in all floors, sub-stations, electrical rooms, A/C plant and so forth, which are connected to a centralised computer located at the enclosures of the chief security officer. There are also many portable fire extinguishers at each floor in different locations. The rear periphery of the building has fire escape stairs, with fire escape routes displayed with signboards at various points of the building. The car ramps can also be used as fire escape routes. The building has two entrances, one from Binny Road and another from Anna Salai, for fire engines.

Fire safety includes a water capacity of 1.2 million litres, fire sprinklers, smoke and heat detection systems and fire extinguishers. The in-house fire department has six firemen per shift.

== Shops ==
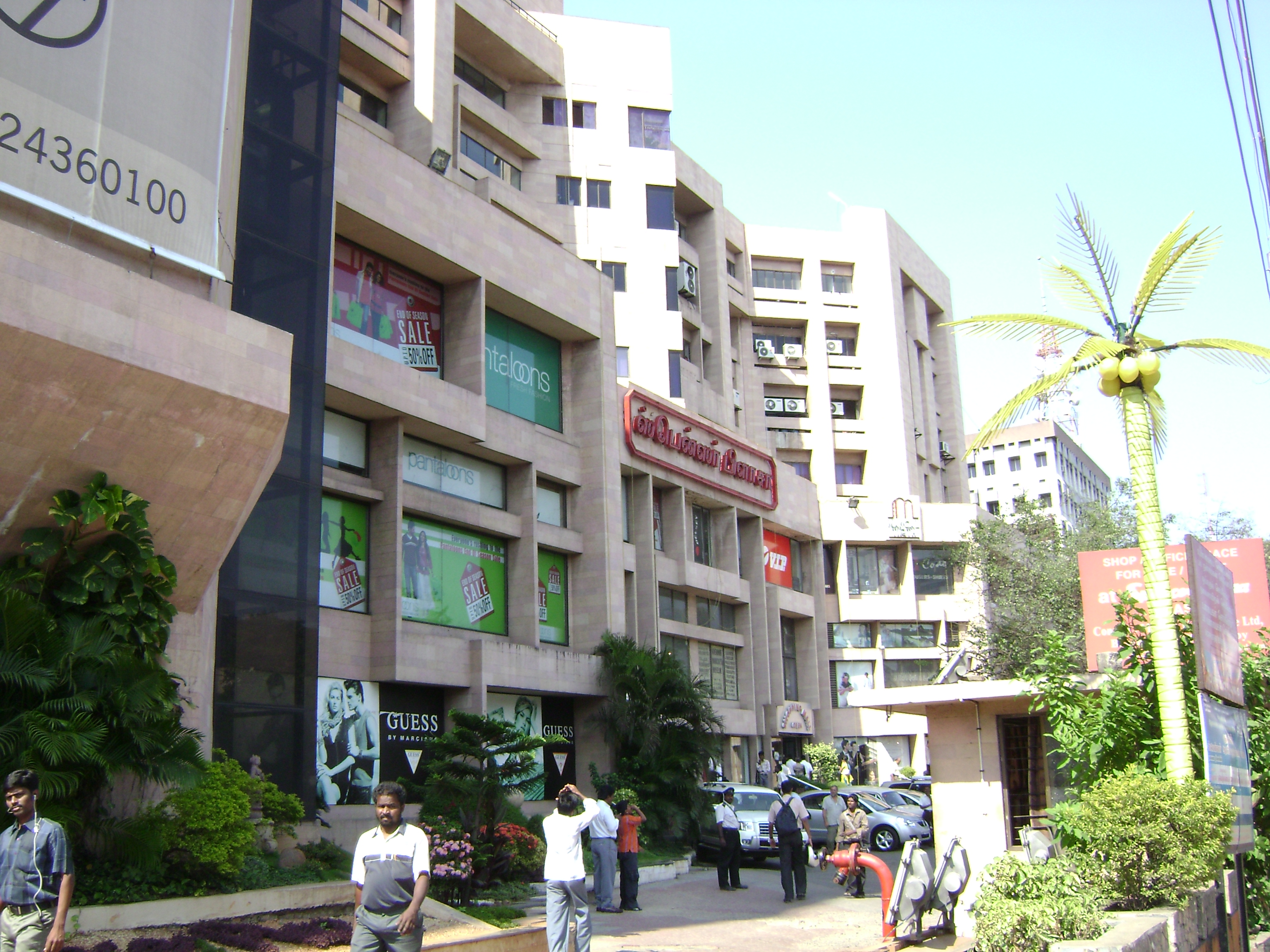
Phase II entrance

The mall hosts major anchor stores such as Westside (spread across 20,000 sq ft) and Landmark (40,000 sq ft), and several local and international brands such as Nike, Adidas, Bata, Regal, Health & Glow, Vummidiars, Van Heusen, Proline, Allen Solly, Florshaim shoes, Lipton, Louis Philippe, Titan, Levi's, Casio, V.I.P. Luggage, Spencer & Co (40,000 sq ft on the ground, first and second floors), Timex Watch Showroom, Swatch, Cookie Man, BPL (Profx), Color Plus, Navigator, Witco, Pantaloons (26,000 sq ft), Arrow, Lee, Music World (now closed), Food World, HSBC, ABN AMRO, American Express, Citibank (65,000 sq ft in second and third phases), First Flight and Du Bowl (16,000 sq ft). McDonald's, the world's largest fast food chain, has established an outlet.

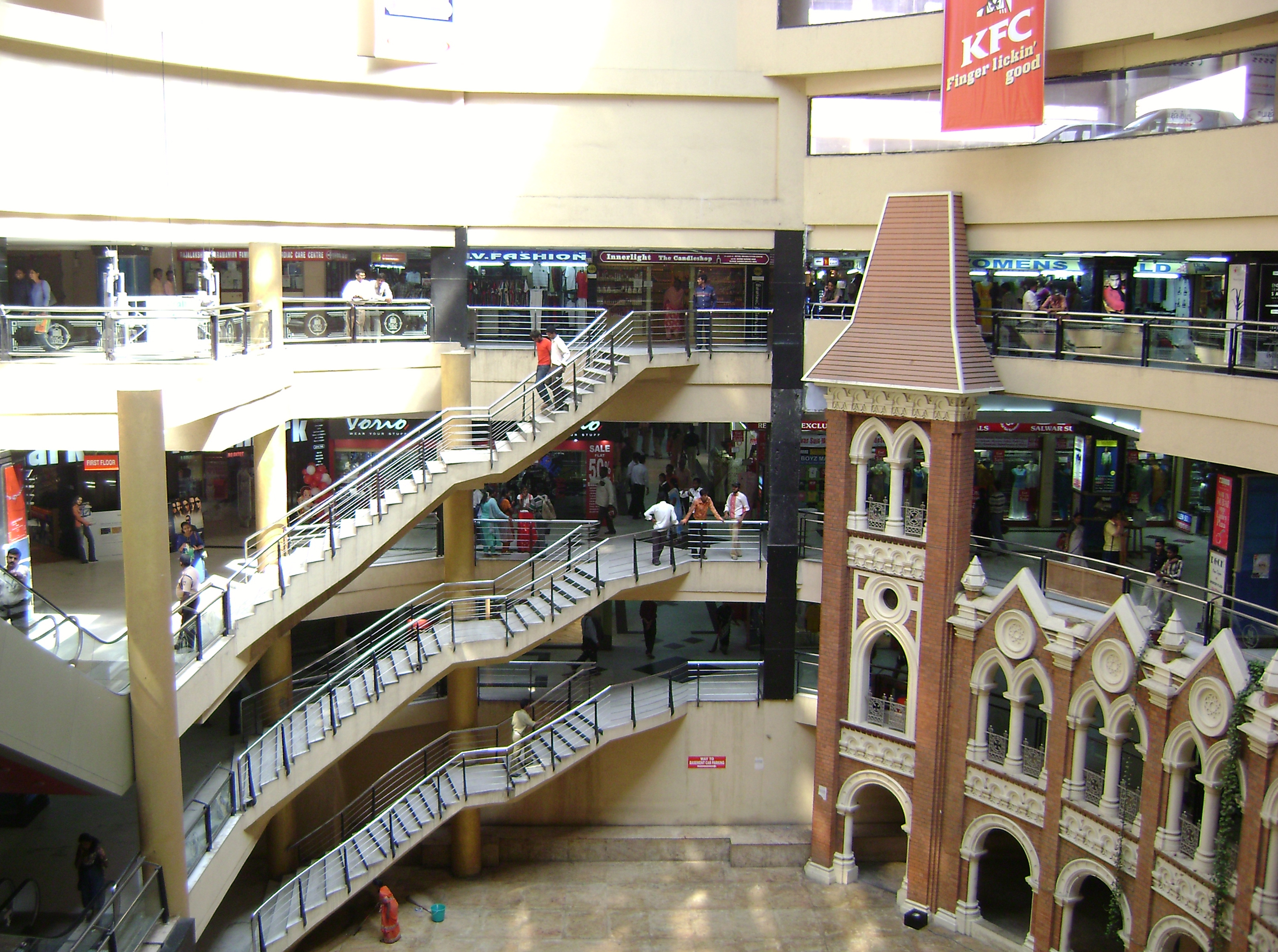
Inside Phase III

On 26 February 2004, the Sri Lanka Export Development Board (SLEDB) established a trade centre at the complex at a cost of ₹17 million. The Sri Lanka Trade Centre is spread over 20,000 sq ft on the first floor at the third phase of the building. Seventeen frontline Sri Lankan companies display apparel, artificial flowers, confectionaries, footwear and leather products, gems and jewellery, herbal products, light engineering products, porcelain, tableware, Ceylon tea and toys.

== Incidents ==
On 4 September 2008, a fire erupted on the first floor of the building's first phase around 10:20 p.m. local time, perhaps due to a short circuit. A garment shop was burned in the incident. With the help of 12 water tenders and 9 fire tenders, the fire was extinguished within 30 minutes, and no casualties were reported. The firemen had easy access to the spot, mainly due to the setback space available inside the building.
