= Flyovers in Chennai =

Chennai flyovers

Chennai is home to one of the largest road networks in India. The total road network in the city's metropolitan area is 2,780 km. With Chennai's vehicular population having experienced a surge in the late 1990s, several flyovers were built to reduce the traffic congestion in the city. Of about ₹ 15,600 million invested by the state government between 2005 and 2016, Chennai cornered a major chunk of the investment. As of 2016, there were 42 functional flyovers in the city and about 30 bridges, catering to the city's vehicular population of about 12 million, including about 600,000 cars. In addition, more than 36 flyovers are in the pipeline.

== Beginnings ==
The city's first flyover is the Anna Flyover at the Gemini Circle built in 1973, which was the third in India, after the ones at Kemps Corner and Marine Drive in Mumbai. It was also the longest flyover in the country when it was built. No major flyovers were built in the following 20 years or so. The number of flyovers in the city began to rise in the late 1990s when a string of nine flyovers were built across the city during the tenure of the then Mayor of the city, M. K. Stalin.

== Road space ==
As of 1 April 2013, the total vehicle population of Chennai is 3,881,850, including 3,053,233 two wheelers.

The flyover construction in the city has resulted in the addition of a mere 12.4 km of extra road capacity between 2005 and 2014. As of 2014, the total length of operational flyovers in the city was 13.5 km.

== List of flyovers ==
Flyover Name	Location	Length (km)	Lanes	Completed Year	Reference
Medavakkam Junction flyover	Medavakkam	2	3-6		
Airport flyover		1.7	3		
Panagal Park flyover		1.5			
Pallavaram New Unidirectional Flyover	Pallavaram	1.4	3		
Koyambedu CMBT flyover	Koyambedu	1.15			
Perambur Flyover	Perambur	1			
Madhavaram Roundtana Byepass Flyover		1	4		
Thirumangalam flyover	Thirumangalam	0.85	4		
Retteri Flyover	Retteri	0.8	6		
Usman Flyover		0.8	4		
Vandalur flyover	Vandalur	0.75	6		
Keelkattalai flyover	Keelkattalai	0.7			
Music Academy flyover		0.7			
Vyasarpadi flyover	Vyasarpadi	0.68	4		
Moolakkadai flyover	Moolakkadai	0.65	4		
Pallikaranai Flyover	Pallikaranai	0.64	6		
MIT Flyover	Chromepet	0.6	4		
Mint flyover		0.6	4		
Pantheon Road flyover		0.57			
Vadapalani Junction flyover	Vadapalani	0.55	2		
Gemini Flyover	T Nagar	0.5		1973	
MGR flyover	Porur	0.5	4		
IIT Madras Flyover		0.5	2		
Mahalingapuram flyover	Mahalingapuram	0.5	2		
G N Chetty Road flyover		0.5	2		
Peters Road flyover		0.5	2		
Dr. Radhakrishnan Road flyover		0.4	2		
Alwarpet Flyover	Alwarpet				
Doveton Flyover	Vepery				
Madhuravoyal grade separator	Madhuravoyal				
Padi grade separator	Padi				
Koyambedu grade separator	Koyambedu				
Kathipara grade separator					
Tambaram flyover	Tambaram				
Conran Smith Road flyover					
TTK Road flyover					
Pallavaram Flyover	Pallavaram				
Pallavaram Railway Station Flyover	Pallavaram				
Velachery Taramani Road - Kamakshi Hospital Junction flyover	Velachery				
Tambaram Sanitorium (Bharatha Matha Street) flyover	Tambaram				
Kilkattalai - Pallavaram Radial Road Junction flyover	Kilkattalai				
Velachery Junction flyover	Velachery				
Anna Arch flyover - Arumbakkam					
Anna Arch flyover Aminjikarai					

== Criticism ==
Between 2005 and 2014, the state government has spent over ₹15,590 million erecting flyovers and grade separators, of which ₹11,440 million (88%) was invested in Chennai. The city hosts all 21 elevated urban corridors open to traffic in the state in 2014.

In the late 1990s, a Traffic Action Plan was prepared for the city. It is said the brain behind the traffic action plan was the Society of Indian Automobile Manufacturers (SIAM), which organised seminars in hotels and conducted traffic studies and public opinion surveys. The investments made by the automobile industry resulted in an increase in the city's per capita ownership of cars, which by 2012 was second in the country, behind New Delhi.

Various global studies indicate that flyovers and elevated roads tend to "induce" new traffic because of the apparent extra road space, and this held true in the case of Chennai, according to experts. The number of vehicles on Chennai's roads had increased dramatically since the late 1990s, resulting in regular traffic snarls.

Critics also say that, despite costing 4 to 5 times a normal road, flyovers do not resolve the problem of traffic congestion. For the ₹15,500 million spent between 2005 and 2014 by the state government, critics opine that the government could instead have invested in buying about 7,000 public transport buses or laid more than 2,000 km of dedicated cycle lanes or built an extensive bus rapid transit system covering about 150 km.

== New projects ==
Thirteen more flyover projects have been announced by the state government: Kattupakkam, Akkarai, Ambattur, Avadi, Madhavaram, Ramapuram, Kundrathur, Kaiveli, Selaiyur, Korattur, Vadapalani-P.T. Rajan Salai junction, Madhya Kailash and Madipakkam.

== See also ==
- Transport in Chennai
