= Anna Flyover =

Bridge in India

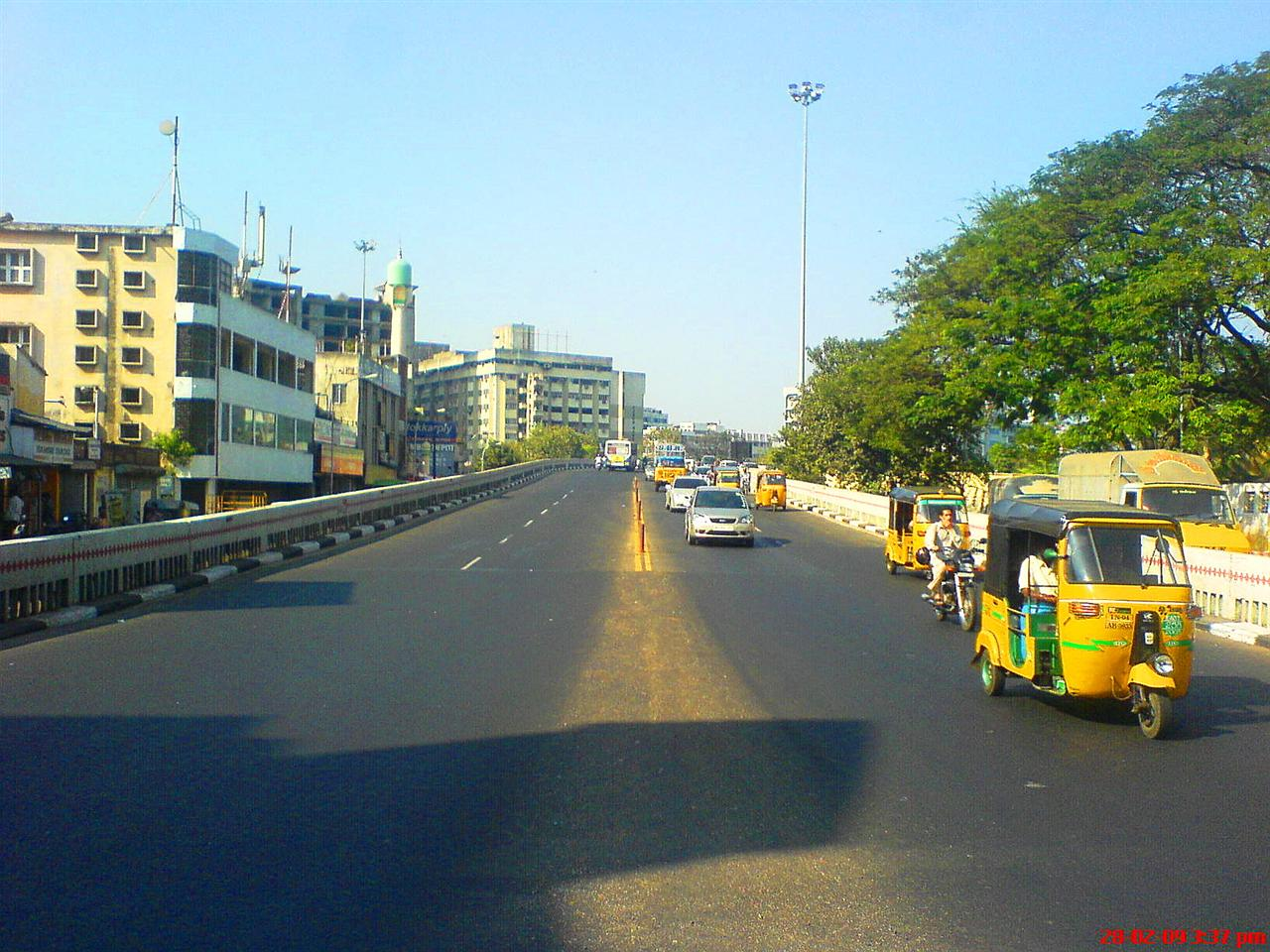
- Anna flyover
- Interactive map of Anna Flyover

Location
- Chennai, India
- Coordinates: 13.05238°N 80.25104°E
- Roads at junction: Mount Road; Nungambakkam High Road; Cathedral Road

Construction
- Type: Flyover
- Lanes: 2
- Constructed: 1973 by East Coast Construction and Industries
- Opened: 1973
- Maximum height: 4.3 metres (14 ft)
- Maximum width: 20 metres (66 ft)

Anna Flyover, also known as Gemini Flyover, is a dual-armed grade separator in the central business district of Chennai, India. Built in 1973, it is the first flyover in Chennai and the third in India. It was the longest flyover in the country at its completion. It allows traffic movements on Anna Salai (formerly Mount Road) to cross traffic with grade separation. The area and the flyover is named after the now-demolished Gemini Studios.

On two sides of the circle roundabout below the centre of the flyover are two identical statues that commemorate the banning of horse racing in Tamil Nadu.

== History and design ==
Anna flyover was constructed in 1973 by East Coast Construction and Industries in 21 months at a cost of ₹ 6.6 million and was opened to traffic on 1 July 1973. The architects of the flyover had made provision for its extension, if necessary, on either side. Its design has remained nearly identical since the 1970s. The flyover is 500 m long.

== Landmarks ==
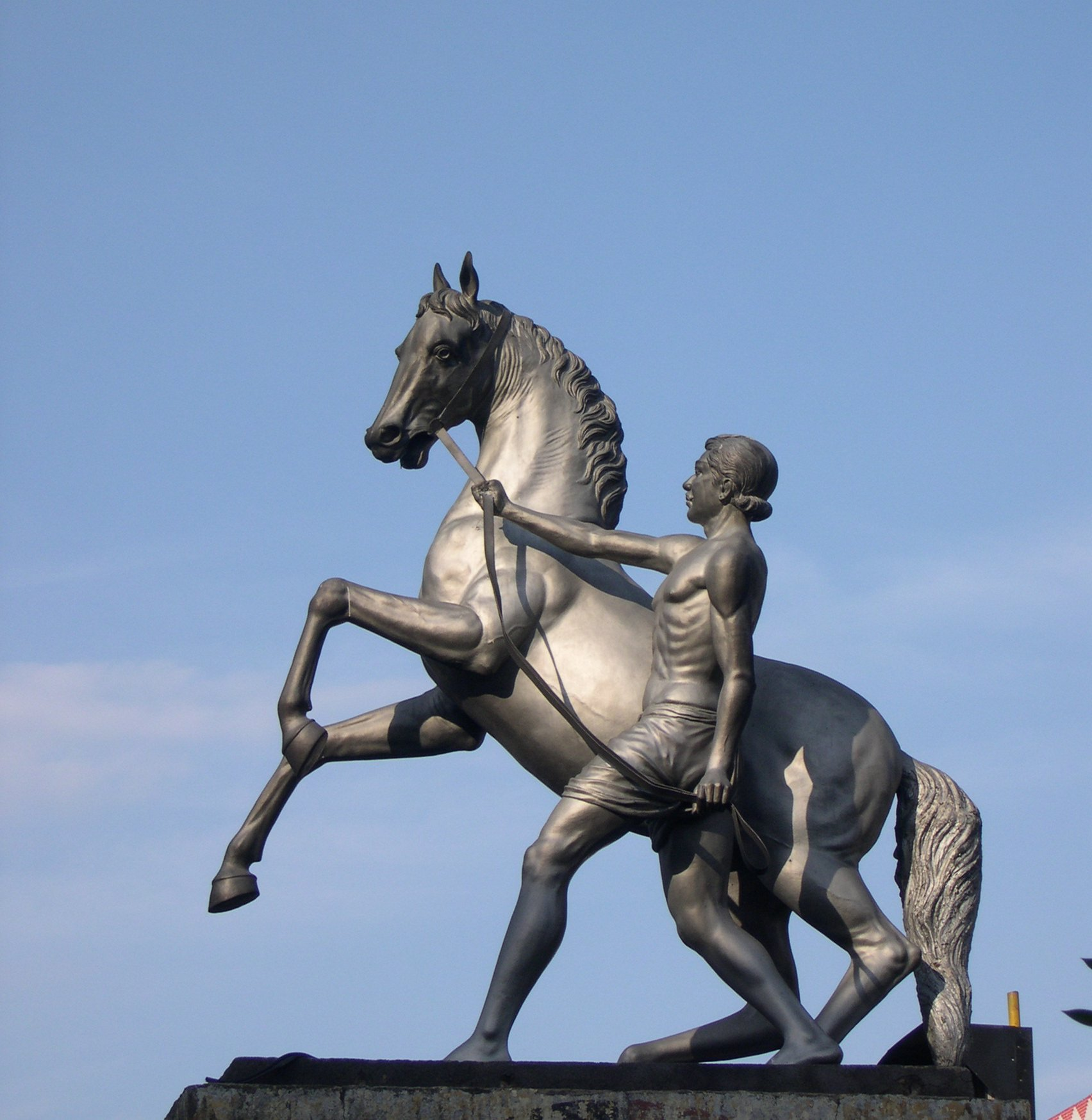
Equestrian statue on the Nungambakkam side of Anna flyover

This Equestrian horse statue was sculpted by the M. N. Jayaram Nagappa son of sculptor Rao Bahadur M. S. Nagappa and brother of M. N. Mani Nagappa, who is also a sculptor.

Notable landmarks abutting the Anna Flyover include the old Safire Theatre complex, the Oxford University Press and the U.S. Consulate.

Gemini studio has been demolished and a shopping complex called Parson Manor and a 5-star deluxe hotel called The Park have been built in its place. Opposite to these across the flyover lies the Semmozhi Poonga, the 20-acre, ₹ 80-million botanical garden constructed by the horticultural department.

== Traffic ==
In the 1970s, over 9,000 vehicles crossed the junction during peak hour. By the 2010s, the stretch between Parry's Corner and Nandanam was used by over 16,000 vehicles during rush hour. Anna Salai is used by over 0.183 million vehicles every day.

An average of 20,000 vehicles per hour pass through the intersection beneath the flyover.

== Developments ==
The government had plans to lease out the area under the flyover to a restaurant, a shopping centre, godowns and a parking lot, and for advertising.

A preliminary study by Chennai City Connect, an NGO working on improving traffic and transport conditions in Chennai, found that the Gemini Circle intersection costs the city ₹ 270,000 a day in petrol, human capital and ecological loss. There are plans to build a flyover on top of the existing flyover. A short-term plan at a cost of ₹ 9 million has also been planned.

Anna Flyover is now maintained by Aircel Cellular as a part of corporate social responsibility, which has implemented LED lighting accentuating the parapets of the flyover. LED lighting to beautify a public structure has been implemented for the first time in India by city-based Abra Media Networks; TNRIDC, a division of Highways, has awarded the contract to Aircel starting from July 2010.

== Accidents and incidents ==
In January 1998, a small bomb was detonated under the flyover near the American consulate building.

On 27 June 2012, over 40 people were injured when a Metropolitan Transport Corporation bus overturned while negotiating a curve and fell from the flyover from a height of 20 ft.

== See also ==
- Flyovers in Chennai
