= Madhya Kailash Junction =

Bridge in Chennai, India

Madhya Kailash Trumpet Interchange
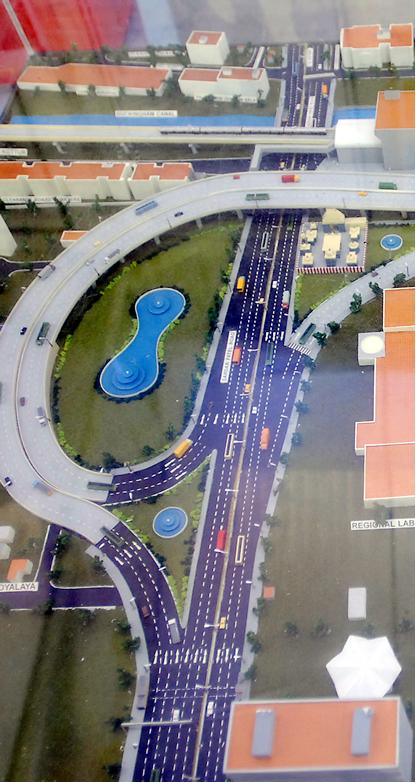
- TNRDC's rejected design

Location
- Chennai, India
- Coordinates: 13.006722°N 80.247369°E
- Roads at junction: Rajiv Gandhi Salai; Sardar Patel Road

Construction
- Lanes: 6
- Constructed: Originally proposed for 2007

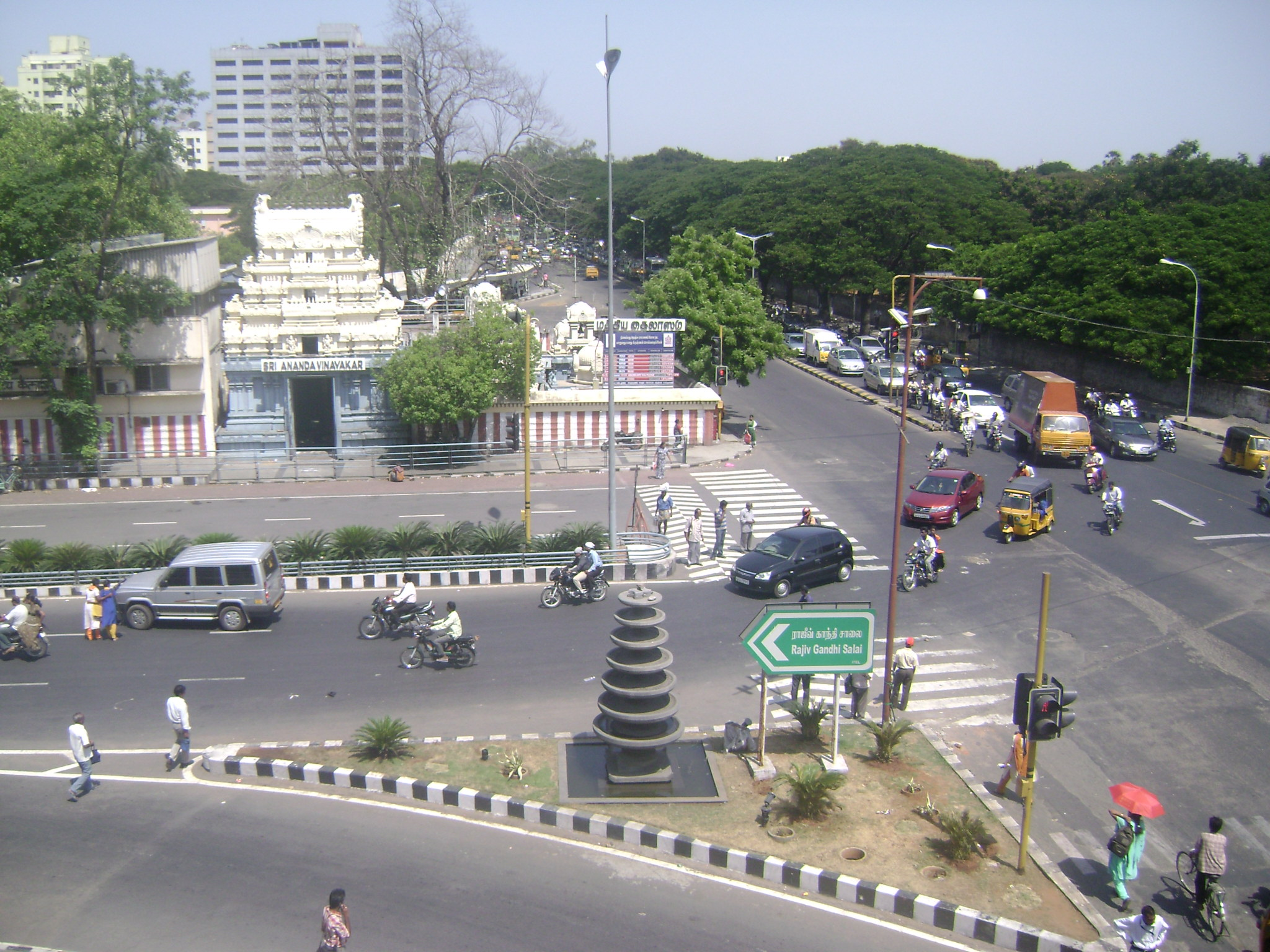
Madhya Kailash from MRTS Station

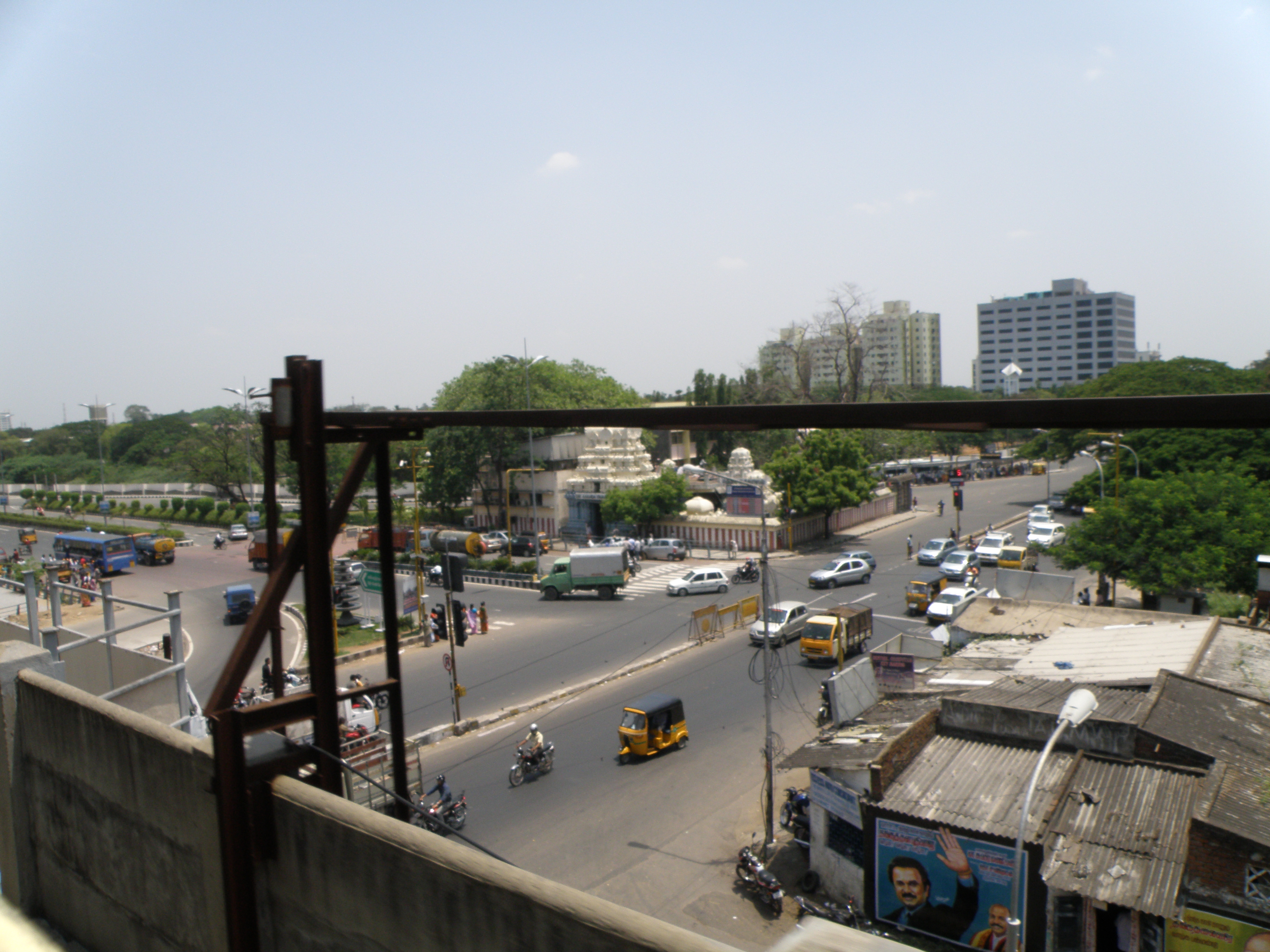
Madhya Kailash as seen from the Chennai MRTS

The Madhya Kailash Junction is an important junction in the southern part of the city of Chennai. It is located at the beginning of the Rajiv Gandhi Salai (IT Expressway) which intersects the Sardar Patel Road in the form of "T".

== Madhya Kailash Interchange ==
Four flyovers were planned to be completed by 2009, but these projects have remained unbuilt. A Trumpet interchange is planned for the junction. The interchange starts at the IT Expressway in front of Kasturba Nagar station and goes parallel to MRTS line and then turn about while splitting into two joining the Sardar Patel Road. As of December 2007, the corporation and government were yet to finalise the design and alignment of the flyover.

== See also ==
- Koyambedu Junction
- Kathipara Junction
- Padi Junction
- Maduravoyal Junction
