= Velachery (disambiguation) =

Velachery is a residential area in southern Chennai, Tamil Nadu, India.

Velachery may also refer to these things associated with the area:

- Velachery railway station
- Velachery (state assembly constituency)
- Velachery Lake
- Velachery taluk, a subdistrict of Tamil Nadu
- Velachery twin flyovers
