= East Coast Elevated Expressway =

Road in Chennai, India

Route information
- Maintained by Tamil Nadu State Highways
- Length: 9.7 km (6.0 mi)

Major junctions
- From: Light House, Chennai
- East Coast of Bay of Bengal Adyar Estuary Besant Nagar
- To: East Coast Road

Location
- Country: India
- Major cities: Chennai

Highway system
- Roads in India; Expressways; National; State; Asian
- Chennai HSCTC

The East Coast Elevated Expressway is a proposed 9.7 kilometres (6.0 mi) elevated expressway in the city of Chennai, India. It runs along the coast of Bay of Bengal crossing Adyar Estuary passing by the western side of Broken bridge, Chennai. This corridor is being implemented by the Tamil Nadu Highways Department in two phases and forms a part of circular transportation corridors.

== Alignment ==
There are three segments for the project. The vertical clearance is 5.5 m.

=== Phase 1: Lighthouse — Elliot's Beach [4.7 km] ===
==== Gandhi Statue — Foreshore Estate: [2.4 km] ====
- This section is 4-laned. The ramp starts near Light House on the service road left of Kamarajar Salai.
- The entry ramp (entering the corridor) starts next to the lighthouse and takes a right turn into the elevated corridor.
- The exit ramp (exiting towards Gandhi Statue) starts in front of the IG ramp takes a left turn after 300 m and turns right 50m just after the Lighthouse and runs along the median of the Nochikuppam Road/ Elevated Expressway.
- Both ramps meets @ 0.5 km and run for distance of 1.9 km and continue to pass through the next section.
- This section provides the connectivity between the Buckingham corridors with the Adyar Corridor of circular corridors.

==== Foreshore Estate — Elliot's Beach: [2.3 km] ====
- An entry and exit ramp at Foreshore Estate junction joins the main section and continues as a 4-lane road till Elliot's Beach.
- It runs for a distance of 1.7 km and joins Besant Nagar 5th Avenue Road @ Elliot's Beach.
- It crosses Adyar River and passes to the west of Broken Bridge.
- It also includes a 4-lane Through arch bridge called "Signature Bridge" across Adyar Estuary for a distance of 250 m.
- This section was proposed as a 6-lane stretch by the consultant but the committee wants it to be 4-laned uniformly throughout the corridor!

==== Right of Way (ROW) ====
From (km)	To (km)	Length (km)	Right of way (ROW) (m)	Section/Location
0+000	0+370	0.370	32.5	Approach ramps and at grade roads in Kamarajar Salai
0+370	2+000	1.630	21.5 to 26.5	Elevated corridor along Santhome loop road up to Foreshore Estate
2+000	3+055	1.055	26.5 to 40.0	Ramp location in Foreshore Estate including two lane entry & exit ramps
3+055	3+240	0.185	18	After ramp at Foreshore Estate up to Adyar Bridge, along Srinivasapuram
3+250	3+529	0.279	20.5	Along bridge across Adyar River
3+529	3+670	0.141	18	After Adyar Bridge across Adyar River
3+670	4+280	0.610	27 to 30	From Adyar Bridge to Ramp at Orukuppam
4+280	4+640	0.360	35	From Approach to Besant Nagar Junction

=== Phase 2: Elliot's Beach — East Coast Road [5 km] ===
This stretch runs over Elliots Beach Road and turns east near velankanni church and runs parallel to the Bay of Bengal till Kottivakkamkuppam and take a right turn to join the East Coast Road at Kottivakkam

== Ramps ==
The corridor will have entry and exit ramps at the following places.

- Lighthouse, Chennai
- Foreshore Estate
- Elliot's Beach
- Kottivakkam

== Project Status ==
=== 2009 ===
January:

- Wilbur Smith Associates submitted the final feasibility study of the corridor.
- Protests from Green Activists.
- Project will make 30-year-old conservation program of the critically endangered olive ridley turtles useless, fears environmentalists.

26 August:

- The planned development near the adyar estuary is put on hold following strong requests from people. The area near Theosophical Society will also remain untouched.

14 October:

- Entry and exit ramps at light house realigned.
- Broken bridge to be demolished and rebuild as a steel-arched bridge.

=== 2010 ===
5 May: Detailed Feasibility Study approved and DPR would be prepared.
