= Chennai Rapid Bus Transit Ways =

Transport scheme in Chennai, India

Chennai Rapid Bus Transit Ways (RBTW)

Overview
- Locale: Chennai, India
- Transit type: Rapid transit
- Number of lines: 15

Technical
- System length: 342 kilometres (213 mi)

See also Chennai BRTS, another planned bus transit system.

The Chennai Rapid Bus Transit Ways (RBTW) is a part of the Medium-term and Long-term Transport Scheme proposed in the Second Master Plan by the Chennai Metropolitan Development Authority (CMDA). This is not a part of Chennai BRTS, which is proposed on a separate elevated road that is to be constructed as circular corridors.

The Rapid Bus ways proposed along the following 7 routes, covering a distance of 100 km, would be taken up in the Medium-term Transportation Scheme

- Rajiv Gandhi Salai (OMR/IT Corridor) [20 km]
- Taramani Link Road [5 km]
- MBI Road [15 km]
- Pallavaram - Thoraipakkam Road [15 km]
- Sardar Patel Road [10 km]
- NSK Salai (Arcot Road) - KS Road [20 km]
- St. Thomas Mount - Poonamalle (Mount. Poonamalle Road) [15 km]

The following 8 routes will be covered in the Long-term Transportation Scheme

- Anna Salai [30 km]
- Poonamallee High Road [25 km]
- Jawaharlal Nehru Salai (IRR) [45 km]
- GNT Road [20 km]
- CTH Road [15 km]
- Chennai Bypass [20 km]
- Outer Ring Road (ORR) [62 km]
- CMBT - Sriperumbudur [25 km]
