= Vaikkadu =

Vaikkadu வைக்காடு Manali Roundana
- Neighbourhood
- Location within Chennai Location within Tamil Nadu Location within India
- Coordinates: 13.18164°N 80.26984°E
- Country: India
- State: Tamil Nadu
- District: Chennai
- Taluk: Tiruvottiyur
- Metro: Chennai
- Zone & Ward: Manali Zone 2 & Ward 18

Languages
  - Official: Tamil
- Time zone: UTC+5:30 (IST)
- PIN: 600103
- Telephone code: 044-2594
- Vehicle registration: TN-18-xxxx & TN-20-xxxx(old)
- Civic agency: Greater Chennai Corporation
- Planning agency: CMDA
- City: Chennai
- Lok Sabha constituency: Chennai North
- Vidhan Sabha constituency: Tiruvottiyur
- Website: http://www.chennaicorporation.gov.in/

Vaikkadu (Tamil: வைக்காடு), is an industrial area in Manali, North of Chennai, a metropolitan city in Tamil Nadu, India. Vaikkadu is known for Manali Roundana, place where Tiruvottiyur-Ponneri high road intersects with originating Jawaharlal Nehru Road (Inner Ring Road) and Manali High road. Madras Fertilizer Limited and Toshiba JSW Power Systems Pvt. Ltd are notable companies located within Vaikkadu in Manali Industrial belt. In October 2011, the erstwhile Manali municipality is merged with Greater Chennai Corporation and it came under the jurisdiction of Greater Chennai Corporation. Though Vaikkadu is annexed with Greater Chennai Corporation it is still remained as a part of Tiruvottiyur taluk in Tiruvallur district.

== Location ==
Vaikkadu is located in Manali, North Chennai with Tiruvottiyur in the east and south. Other neighbouring areas include Mathur, Madhavaram, Andarkuppam, Manali New Town, Kosappur, Ennore.
