= Madhavaram Junction =

Bridge in India

Coordinates: 13.152119°N 80.209918°E

Madhavaram Junction, also known as Madhavaram Bypass, is an important junction in the city of Chennai, India. It is located in Madhavaram to the north of Maduravoyal Junction at the intersection of Chennai Bypass and NH 5. It leads to Redhills to the West, Manali to the North, Moolakadai to the East and Anna Nagar to the South.

== Trumpet Interchange ==
A trumpet interchange is constructed to connect the Chennai Bypass with NH 5.

== See also ==
- Transport in Chennai
