= Chennai Bus Rapid Transit System =

Planned bus rapid transit system in Chennai, India

Chennai BRTS

Overview
- Locale: Chennai
- Transit type: Elevated Bus rapid transit
- Number of lines: 1
- Number of stations: 21 (1st phase)

Technical
- System length: 70.3 kilometres (43.7 mi)

See also Chennai Rapid Bus Transit Ways, another planned bus transit system.

Chennai BRTS was a bus rapid transit system taken up as an integrated part of Circular Corridor Project in India. Beginning at Adyar, the route will cover Saidapet, Jafferkanpet, Ramavaram, Puzhal, Manali, Chennai Central Railway Station, Lighthouse and will return to Adyar. The corridor will cover a distance of 70.3 kilometres (43.7 mi). The route of the elevated BRTS corridor was planned to run along the banks of Adyar river and Buckingham canal. The project was expected to be completed by 2013.

== Corridors ==
The BRTS system was supposed to be integrated with the Circular Corridor 1 of the High Speed Circular Corridors.

- Lighthouse — Adyar — IT corridor — Kundrathur — Madhuravoyal — Ennore — Vyasarpadi — Chennai Port — Lighthouse (Outer ellipse, Longest) [70.3 km]

== Alignment ==
The Exclusive BRTS lane was proposed to be integrated with the circular corridor 1. Two different types were under consideration.

- Along the median of the 6-lane single-tier system.
- On top of the 6-lane two-tier system. BRTS 2-lanes was proposed on the top tier and 4-lane for general traffic at the bottom second tier.

The following was the general alignment of the entire BRTS corridor. This was the alignment of the entire BRTS corridor.

- Thiru-vi-ka Bridge — Ramavaram (elevated, along the median of circular corridor or top tiers)
- Ramavaram — NH-bypass (elevated, grade separated, beneath the circular corridor 1)
- NH-bypass — Madhavaram (elevated, along NH-bypass median)
- Madhavaram — TPP Road (elevated, along the median of IRR)
- TPP Road — Manali Oil Refinery(MOR) (elevated, along the median of Manali Oil Refinery Road (MORR)
- MOR — Chennai Central (elevated, along the western banks of North Buckingham Canal)
- Chennai Central — Adyar (elevated, along the Buckingham canal and abutting the MRTS)

== Stations ==
=== Station type ===
Tower structure was proposed for the BRTS stations. Two types depending on the type of the corridor [single or more tiers] were proposed.

- Towers along the median of the 6-lane single tier system.
- Towers along the curb-side for the 2-tier and 3-tier system.

=== Station locations ===
21 bus stations were proposed for the first phase of the BRTS.

Corridor Name	Length	Number of Bus station	Bus station Name
Adyar Corridor	15.8 km	7	Adyar, West Canal Road, Kotturpuram, Saidapet, Jafferkhanpet, Nandambakkam, Porur
NH-Bypass Corridor	13 km	5	Porur, Madhuravoyal, Ambattur (Mogappiar), NH-205 cross road, Puzhal
Northern IRR section	8 km	3	Madhavarm junction, Manjambakkam, TPP road junction
North B' Canal Corridor	12 km	6	Junction of Manali High Road and Buckingham Canal, interchange with Kamarajar Salai, Basin road, near Indian Oil Corporation bottling plant, Korukkupet, Basin Bridge, near central station
South B' Canal Corridor	-	4	at walajah Road junction, Triplicane, near Madaveli MRTS Station, Kotturpuram

== Design speed ==
The speed design for the BRTS corridor was proposed to be 60 km/h - 70 km/h.

== Integration of BRTS with other transits ==
The BRTS was proposed to be integrated with different modes of transits already existing or under construction or proposed for the city. Apart from that major roads were also to be integrated. The following is a list of locations of BRTS integrating different modes of Transport in Chennai city.

BRTS and Transits
Major roads	IT corridor extension via West Canal Bank Road, Gandhimandapam / TurnBulls Road, Anna Salai, Jawaharlal Nehru Road (IRR), Mount-Poonamallee Road, Arcot Road
Major railway stations	Chennai Central, Basin Bridge Junction
MRTS stations	Kotturpuram, Chepauk, Mandaveli
Metro stations	Saidapet (Metro corridor 1), Jafferkhanpet (Metro corridor 2)

== Project status ==
=== 2008 ===
November:

- Wilbur Smith Associates won the contract of TNUIFSL to prepare the feasibility study and DPR for the project.

=== 2009 ===
28 May:

- DPR, cost estimates, work drawings and bid documents for the first leg of BRTS on Adyar corridor of the Chennai High Speed Circular Corridors (HSCC) was released to the public.
- Public consultation will be held soon.

3 June:

- Residents oppose the project as they will be displaced for the project.
- Adyar Poonga Trust promises to resettle the displaced.

26 August:

- Feasibility study for the project was likely to be over by January 2010. Total Corridor length was 110 km.

== See also ==
- Mass Rapid Transit System (Chennai)
- Chennai Metro
- Chennai Elevated Expressways
- Chennai Monorail
- Metropolitan Transport Corporation (Chennai)
