= Inner Ring Road, Chennai =

Transportation corridor encircling the city of Chennai

Inner Ring Road, Chennai

Route information
- Maintained by Highways Department, Tamil Nadu
- Length: 25.2 km (15.7 mi)

Major junctions
- North end: SH 104 in Manali
- NH 5 in Madhavaram; NH 205 at Padi Junction; SH 112 in Thirumangalam; NH 4 at Koyambedu Junction; SH 113 in Vadapalani; NH 32 at Kathipara Junction
- South end: SH 49A in Thiruvanmiyur

Location
- Country: India

Highway system
- Roads in India; Expressways; National; State; Asian

The Inner Ring Road (IRR), also known as Jawaharlal Nehru Salai or 100-Feet road or State Highway 2, is a major transportation corridor encircling the city of Chennai. It was developed by the Chennai Metropolitan Development Authority (CMDA). It is 25.2 km long with three distinct arms viz., Northern arm, Central arm and Southern arm, connecting SH 49A (Rajiv Gandhi Salai) in Tiruvanmiyur, Velachery main road at Vijayanagar, NH 32 (GST road) at Kathipara, NH 4 at Koyambedu, NH 205 at Padi, NH 5 at Madhavaram and joining SH 104 (TPP Road) at Manali.

== Details of the corridor ==
The IRR is a 6-lane road with three arms. The northern arm of IRR starts from Padi Junction and joins SH 104 (TPP) near Manali. It connects NH5 at Madhavaram Junction. The central arm extends from Kathipara Junction and ends at Padi Junction. It connects NH 32 at Kathipara Junction, NH4 at Koyambedu Junction and NH 205 at Padi Junction. The northern and central arms together form State Highway 2. The southern arm of IRR extends from IT corridor in the form of Taramani Link Road and joins NH 32 at Officers Training Academy before ending at Kathipara Junction. The Chennai RBTW is being planned along the Taramani Link Road.

== See also ==
- Transport in Chennai
