= Mani Nagappa =

Indian sculptor

- Born: c. 1925; Madras, British India
- Died: 15 October 2024
- Occupations: sculptor, choreographer, film producer
- Known for: sculpting statues of political leaders and famous personalities of Tamil Nadu
- Children: Chitra Amritraj

Mani Nagappa (c 1925 - 15 October 2024) is an Indian sculptor who is known for creating statues of prominent personalities and political leaders of Tamil Nadu.

== Early life ==
Nagappa was born in 1925 in Madras, one of the five sons of well-known Indian sculptor M. S. Nagappa. M. S. Nagappa sculpted the statues of British governors, lawyers and administrators and was awarded a "Rao Bahadur" title for his sculpture of George V.

Mani Nagappa had his early education in Madras and was working as a choreographer in Tamil films when M. S. Nagappa's death in 1942, compelled him to take over his father's business. His first sculpture, a statue of Arcot Lakshmanaswami Mudaliar, was eventually approved, thereby giving a start to his career.

== Career ==
Nagappa has sculpted a total of 600 statues in his career. some of them being those of Jawaharlal Nehru, Sivaji Ganesan, U. Muthuramalingam Thevar and R. Venkataraman. In the 1980s, he sculpted the statue of India's first Prime Minister, Jawaharlal Nehru, at the Kathipara Junction in Guindy, Chennai.

In 1991, he sculpted a statue of the Tamil poet Thiruvalluvar commissioned at the rate of Rs. 1.15 lakhs by the Bangalore Tamil Sangham. However, the unveiling of the statue at the Halasuru Lake in Bangalore was delayed by 18 years due to political issues. The statue was eventually unveiled on August 9, 2009 amidst controversy.

== Other activities ==
Apart from sculpting, Mani Nagappa is also interested in collecting vintage and sports cars.

== Family ==
Mani Nagappa's has three daughters the first is Niranjali second Gitanjali and third daughter Chitra is married to tennis player and film producer Ashok Amritraj.
