= M. S. Nagappa =

Indian sculptor, (1890 –1942)

Rao Bahadur M. S. Nagappa
- Born: c. 1890; Madras, British India
- Died: 12 January 1942 (age 51); Madras, India
- Occupation: Sculptor
- Known for: sculpting a statue of George V on the silver jubilee of his reign
- Children: 5, including Mani Nagappa

Rao Bahadur M. S. Nagappa (c. 1890 – 12 January 1942) was an Indian sculptor who designed statues and monuments in British India. In 1935, Nagappa was appointed official sculptor to the British Crown by George V.

== Early life ==
Nagappa was born in a family of traditional sthapathis or sculptors. Sculpting was the main occupation of his ancestors for five generations before him. Nagappa wanted to join the Madras School of Arts but could not. However, impressed with his abilities, Hadaway, the Principal employed Nagappa as his assistant.

== Career ==
When there was a plague epidemic in the Madras Presidency, the government requested Hadaway to prepare a painting of a victim so as to study the plague in detail. Nagappa prepared the painting with the help of a mould of the victim and was acknowledged and awarded for his work. Following this success, Nagappa set up a studio at Narasingapuram (now part of Ritchie Street), Madras.

In 1935, Nagappa prepared a bronze statue of George V and presented it to the monarch during his silver jubilee celebrations on behalf of Lodd Govindoss Chathurbhujadoss, a popular businessman and philanthropist of Madras. Nagappa was awarded a "Rao Bahadur" medal for his work. George V also appointed him official sculptor to the British Crown and presented him with a coat of arms.

In 1936, Nagappa sculpted a statue of the Maharaja of Travancore.

== Death ==
Nagappa died at Narasingapuram on 12 January 1942 at the age of 51.

== Family ==
Nagappa had five sons, three daughters two of whom Rajaram Nagappa - Mani Nagappa and Jayaram Nagappa were also acclaimed sculptors. Among Mani Nagappa's creations are the Jawaharlal Nehru statue at Kathipara Junction and the Thiruvalluvar statue near Ulsoor Lake, Bangalore.
