= Chennai HSCTC =

Chennai High Speed Circular Transportation Corridors
- Adyar corridor, North Buckingham Canal corridor, Central Buckingham Canal corridor, Connectivity corridor, East Coast elevated expressway, Chennai bypass corridor, Chennai Port–Maduravoyal corridor, Mambalam Canal corridor, Inner Ring Road corridor

Route information
- Length: 107.795 km (66.981 mi)
- Existed: 2009–present
- History: First corridor: Chennai Port–Maduravoyal corridor; scheduled for completion in 2013

Location
- Country: India
- Major cities: Chennai

Highway system
- Roads in India; Expressways; National; State; Asian

Chennai High Speed Circular Transportation Corridors (HSCTC) is an urban road transit in the form of elevated concentric beltways planned for the city of Chennai. The beltways are envisaged as an elevated 2-tier system with design speed of 80 km/h. The top tier is a 2-lane dedicated corridor for the Chennai BRTS system. The second tier is a 4-lane road for 4-wheelers (no buses and autos).

== Beltways ==
Four beltways have been proposed, which cover a distance of 107.795 km. A connectivity corridor is also proposed to integrate the beltways with the ECR elevated expressway.

=== Beltway 1 ===
Beltway 1 is the outermost beltway encompassing an area of 167 km^{2}. It is formed by the following corridors.

- Adyar corridor
- Chennai bypass^{#}
- North Buckingham Canal corridor
- Central Buckingham Canal corridor

=== Beltway 2 ===
This beltway encompasses an area of 52 km^{2}. It is formed by the following corridors.

- Adyar corridor
- Chennai bypass^{#}
- Chennai Port–Maduravoyal Expressway^{#}

=== Beltway 3 ===
This beltway encompasses an area of 30 km^{2}. It is formed by the following corridors.

- Adyar corridor
- Inner Ring Road corridor
- Chennai Port–Maduravoyal Expressway^{#}

=== Beltway 4 ===
The beltway 4 is formed by the following corridors.

- Adyar corridor
- Mambalam Canal corridor

=== Integrating beltways with elevated expressways ===
- Connectivity corridor
1. Already under construction by NHAI

== Corridor details ==
These 4 beltways can be broken down into 9 corridors.

Name	Type	Along/across	From	To	via	Length (km)	Cost in INR crores (estimated)	Status	Developed by	Completion
Adyar corridor	Elevated 2-tier corridor	Southern banks of Adyar River	Thiru-vi-ka Bridge	Porur	Nandambakkam	15.845	1430	Proposed	Adyar Poonga Trust	2013 (estimated)
Port-Maduravoyal corridor	Elevated corridor	Banks of Cooum River	Chennai Port	Maduravoyal		19	1655/2090	Under Construction	NHAI	2012
Chennai bypass corridor	Fully access-controlled at grade 4-lane corridor with 2-lane elevated BRTS corridor along the median		Tambaram	Manali	Maduravoyal	32		Complete	NHAI	2010
North Buckingham Canal corridor	Elevated corridor	Western bank of Buckingham Canal, Wall Tax Road, Poonamallee High Road, Flag Staff Road	Manali Oil Refinery Road (MORR)	War Memorial	Chennai Central	12.3	740	Proposed	Adyar Poonga Trust	
Central Buckingham Canal corridor	Elevated corridor	Western Bank of Buckingham Canal	Swami Sivananda Salai	Radhakrishnan Salai		2.860	170	Proposed	Adyar Poonga Trust	
Connectivity corridor	Elevated corridor	ECR Elevated Expressway, Santhome bypass road, Santhome High Road, Greenways Road	Radhakrishnan Salai	Thiru-vi-ka Bridge	Foreshore Estate	5.140	350	Proposed	Adyar Poonga Trust	
Mambalam Canal corridor	Elevated corridor	Mambalam Canal	Adyar corridor	G.N. Chetty Road	Anna Salai, South Usman Road, Venkatnarayana Road, Theyagaraya Road	5.000	195	Proposed	Adyar Poonga Trust	
Inner Ring Road corridor	At-grade 8-lane corridor	Inner Ring Road	Jafferkhan Bridge	Koyambedu	Ashok Nagar	5.95	25	At-grade corridor coz of elevated corridor 2 of Chennai Metro that is under construction along the same alignment.	Adyar Poonga Trust	
East Coast Elevated Expressway	Elevated corridor	East Coast	Light House	ECR	Besant Nagar	9.7	430* (1st phase)	Proposed	Tamil Nadu State Highways	2013 (estimated)
Entire HSCTC						107.795	5400^{#}			

* Revised cost during tender process
# Excluding cost of Chennai bypass corridor

=== Chennai Port–Maduravoyal corridor [19 km] ===
This 19 km corridor is implemented under Phase-VII of National Highways Development Project by NHAI. The pre-construction work has already begun.

=== Chennai bypass corridor [32 km] ===
The Chennai bypass corridor is a 32 km fully access controlled at-grade corridor. A 2-lane elevated BRTS corridor is proposed along the median of the Phase II of this expressway. The corridor is under construction.

=== Adyar corridor [15.845 km] ===
Section I

- Thiru-vi-ka Bridge (Km 0+000) to Nandambakkam Bridge (Km 11+100)
- 11.100 km
- Along Southern bank of Adayar River

Section II

- Nandambakkam Bridge (Km 11+100) to Chennai bypass (Km 15+845)
- 4.845 km
- Along Mount – Poonamalee Road

=== North Buckingham Canal corridor [12.3 km] ===
Section I

- Manali Oil Refinery Road (Km 0+000) to Basin Bridge (Km 8+400)
- 8.400 km
- Along Western bank of Buckingham Canal

Section II

- Basin Bridge (Km 8+400) to Central Station (Km 10+900)
- 2.500 km
- Along Wall Tax Road

Section III

- Central station (Km 10+900) to Muthuswamy Bridge (Km 11+400)
- 0.500 km
- Along Poonamalee High Road

Section IV

- Muthuswamy Bridge (Km 11+400) to war memorial (Km 12+300)
- 0.900 km
- Along Flag Staff Road

=== Central Buckingham Canal corridor [2.860 km] ===
- Swami Sivananda Salai (Km 0+000) to Radhakrishna Salai (Km 2+860)
- Along Western bank of Buckingham Canal

=== Inner Ring Road corridor [5.9 km] ===
- Jafferkhanpet Bridge (Km 0+000) to Koyambedu (Km 5+950)
- Along Inner Ring Road (IRR)

=== Mambalam Canal corridor [5 km] ===
- Adayar River (Km 0+000) to G.N Chetty Road (Km 5+000)
- Along Mambalam Canal

=== Connectivity corridor [5.140 km] ===
- Radhakrisha Salai (Km 0+000) to Thiru-vi-ka Bridge (Km 5.140)
- Along ECR Elevated Expressway from Light House till Foreshore Estate, Santhome Bypass Road, Santhome High Road, Greenways Road

=== East Coast elevated expressway [9.7 km] ===
This is 9.7 km elevated expressway along the east coast of Bay of Bengal from Light House, Chennai to East Coast Road via Besant Nagar.

== Interchanges ==
A total of 15 interchanges has been proposed along the HSCTC alignment of which 3 are already under construction by NHAI. A 3-tier interchange at Irumbuliyur is already functional.

=== Adyar corridor interchanges (6) ===
- A trumpet interchange at the end of Thiruvi-ka-bridge at the junction of Theosophical Society border and Durgabhai Deshmukh Road. This is where the Adyar corridor begins.
- A non-conventional interchange with 5 ramps at Gandhi Mandapam Road.
- A trumpet interchange near Nandanam Cosmopolitan Club where the Mambalam Canal corridor begins with an additional ramp.
- A non-conventional interchange with 2 ramps at Inner Ring Road.
- A non-conventional interchange with 3 ramps at Mount-Poonamallee Road.
- A trumpet interchange at Porur with Chennai bypass with 2 additional ramps. This is where the Adyar corridor ends.

=== Chennai bypass corridor interchanges (2) ===
- A 3-tier interchange at Irumbuliyur. This is where the Chennai bypass corridor begins.
- A trumpet interchange is under construction at Madhavaram where the corridor ends.

=== Chennai Port–Madhuravoyal elevated expressway interchanges (2) ===
- A Clover leaf interchange is under construction at Maduravoyal.
- A modified parclo interchange with 3-loops in under construction at Koyambedu.

=== North Buckingham Canal corridor interchanges (2) ===
- A trumpet interchange at Manali Oil Refinery Road (MORR) with an additional ramp. This is where the Buckingham Canal corridors begin.
- A modified parclo interchange [in the shape of letter 'B'] with 4 additional ramps at Manali High road.

=== Mambalam Canal corridor interchanges (1) ===
- A non-conventional interchange with 4 ramps at Todhunter Nagar.

=== East Coast elevated expressway interchanges (2) ===
- A non-conventional interchange with 4 ramps at Foreshore Estate.
- A 3-tier elevated interchange with the proposed Southern Bund Road along the Adyar River abutting Theosophical Society.

== Project status ==
=== 2008 ===
January:

- Governor's address on the preparation of pre-feasibility study for HSCTC and Preliminary works for Port-Maduravoyal Elevated expressway.

November:

- Wilbur Smith Associates won the contract of TNUIFSL to prepare the feasibility study and DPR for the project.

=== 2009 ===
28 May:

- DIR, cost estimates, work drawings and bid documents for the first leg the Chennai High Speed Circular corridors (HSCC) was released to the public.

31 May:

- Public consultation will be held on June 3, 2009 at 10 a.m at Hotel Checkers, Little Mount.

3 June:

- 2-tier and 3-tier systems were discussed with the public and experts. Residents of the affected areas opposed the project and demanded proper compensation if they are evicted.
- Adyar Poonga Trust promises to resettle the displaced.

16 June:

- Adyar Poonga Trust plans to bring commercial real estate in the elevated corridors as part of the fund equation. Residents voice out asking why not residential real estate for the affected fishermen.
- DPR for Adyar corridor and feasibility for other corridors will be ready by the end of 2009.

12 August:

- HSCTC corridor length shortened to 100 km from 120 to accommodate the elevated section Metro along the IRR and St. Thomas Mount to Porur section.

26 August:

- Feasibility study to be over by January 2010. Total length of the corridor is 110 km. 60 km will be built by NHAI as part of Chennai Port–Maduravoyal Expressway and Ennore–Manali Road infrastructure projects.

=== 2010 ===
July 2010:

- Environmental clearance has been obtained from National Coastal Zone Management Authority (NCZMA) for Chennai Port–Maduravoyal Expressway.

== See also ==
- IT corridor
- Chennai Elevated Expressways
