= Chennai Port–Maduravoyal Expressway =

Road in India

Chennai Port – Vanagaram Elevated Expressway

Route information
- Maintained by National Highways Authority of India
- Length: 20.6 km (12.8 mi)
- History: Completion scheduled for December 2024

Major junctions
- From: Chennai Port
- To: Vanagaram

Location
- Country: India
- Major cities: Nungambakkam

Highway system
- Roads in India; Expressways; National; State; Asian
- Chennai HSCTC
- Spur of Bengaluru–Chennai Expressway

The Chennai Port – Vanagaram Expressway is a 20.6-kilometre (12.8 mi) long, six-lane, double-decker elevated expressway under construction in the city of Chennai, Tamil Nadu, India. The corridor begins at Chennai Port Gate No. 10 and travels along the bank of the Cooum River till it reaches Koyambedu and along the median of NH 48 thereon till it reaches Vanagaram. It is also called Elevated Freeway of India.

== History ==
An 18.3-kilometre (11.4 mi) long, 20-metre (66 ft) wide elevated road project connecting the port with Maduravoyal is under construction at a cost of ₹1,655 crore. Upon completion, this will be the country's longest six-way elevated expressway. The project was sanctioned in June 2007 when the Tamil Nadu Government gave 'in principle' approval to the National Highways Authority of India (NHAI) for the elevated expressway. The project cost then was put at ₹1,468 crore. In January 2009, Prime Minister Manmohan Singh laid the foundation stone for the project but the project was put on hold for want of environmental impact clearance. The project got the environment clearance in February 2011, and during the same month, the port handed over a cheque for ₹50 crore to the NHAI as part of its contribution to the project.

The expressway starts from Gate No. 10 of the Chennai Port near the War Memorial and ends before Maduravoyal Interchange. It would run along the banks of the Cooum up to Koyambedu and would end along the Cooum near the Koyambedu grade separator. From there for a distance of three km up to Maduravoyal the elevated expressway would come up on Poonamallee High Road. There would be a total of four entry and exit ramps as part of the project. While the entry ramps would come up on Sivananda Salai and College Road, the exit points would be provided on Spurtank Road and Kamaraj Salai. The work at the Maduravoyal end began in December 2010. The project is being implemented on a build, own and transfer mode. Of the total project cost of ₹1,655 crore, ₹310 crore has been set aside for land acquisition and rehabilitation and resettlement of nearly 7,400 people living along the project area. About 1,300 people have been rehabilitated at Okkiam Thoraipakkam. Of 30 hectares to be acquired for the project, only 2 hectares belong to private owners. The project was initially expected to be completed by end of 2013. However, the project has been put on hold.

== Project Details ==
This corridor is implemented under Phase-VII of National Highways Development Project by NHAI. The Feasibility study cum DPR was done by Wilbur Smith Associates. This expressway forms a part of the circular corridor 2 of the High Speed Circular Corridors.

=== Alignment ===
- Km 0 - Km 1.56 reaches Northern Cooum River bank and parallel to MRTS line
- @ Km 2.1, the Expressway crosses the Elevated MRTS line between Chintadripet and Park Town Stations
- @ Km 3.2,
- @ Km 13.8, the Road splits into two and merges with NH4 as entry and exit ramps.
- The Expressway section meets the Koyambedu Grade Separator and the section between them will be 10-laned with 2-lane service roads on both sides
- At-grade stretch of 1.5 km because of Koyambedu Grade Separator and Chennai Metro over-head line crossing just after the grade separator
- @ Km 14.227, the Elevated Expressway restarts and goes along NH4 median
- @ Km 17.3, the Expressway starts coming down and meet the Maduravoyal clover-leaf grade separator and the section will be 14-laned [8-lane toll plaza + 6-lane NH4] with 2-lane service roads on both sides
- Elevated section — 17.5 km
- Total Length - 19 km

=== Interchanges ===
- A modified parclo interchange is under construction at Koyambedu junction with 2 arms of a clover leaf and an elevated loop on the third side.

=== Entry ramps ===
- Sivananda Salai
- College Road

=== Exit ramps ===
- Kamarajar Salai
- Spur Tank Road

== Project timeline ==
Date	Event	Ref
7 March 2008	The project was officially launched with the passing of a government order by the then DMK Tamil Nadu state government.	
January 2009	Prime Minister Manmohan Singh laid the foundation stone for elevated expressway from Chennai Port to Madhuravoyal. Soma enterprises was awarded the project and the project is under construction.	
June 2009	Physical work on the corridor to commence from November 2009. Land acquisition and preliminary works like casting yard are under progress.	
July 2010	Environmental clearance has been obtained from National Coastal Zone Management Authority (NCZMA).	
September 2010	Work started.	
April 2012	30 percent of the work was completed. However, the project was put on hold due to the ADMK government State's Water Resources Department alleging deviations in the alignment.	
February 2014	Madras High Court quashes the stop-work order of the state PWD; Orders State government to extend full co-operation to the related parties for speedy completion of the stalled project.	
October 2018	Cost revised to ₹2400 crores. Work to re-start soon.	
March 2022	During the Tamil Nadu 2022-2023 budget session, the finance minister Palanivel Thiagarajan said the Tamil Nadu government would revive and implement the project. The estimated cost of the project was revised to ₹5,770 crore (equivalent to ₹71 billion or US$750 million in 2026).	

== Gallery ==
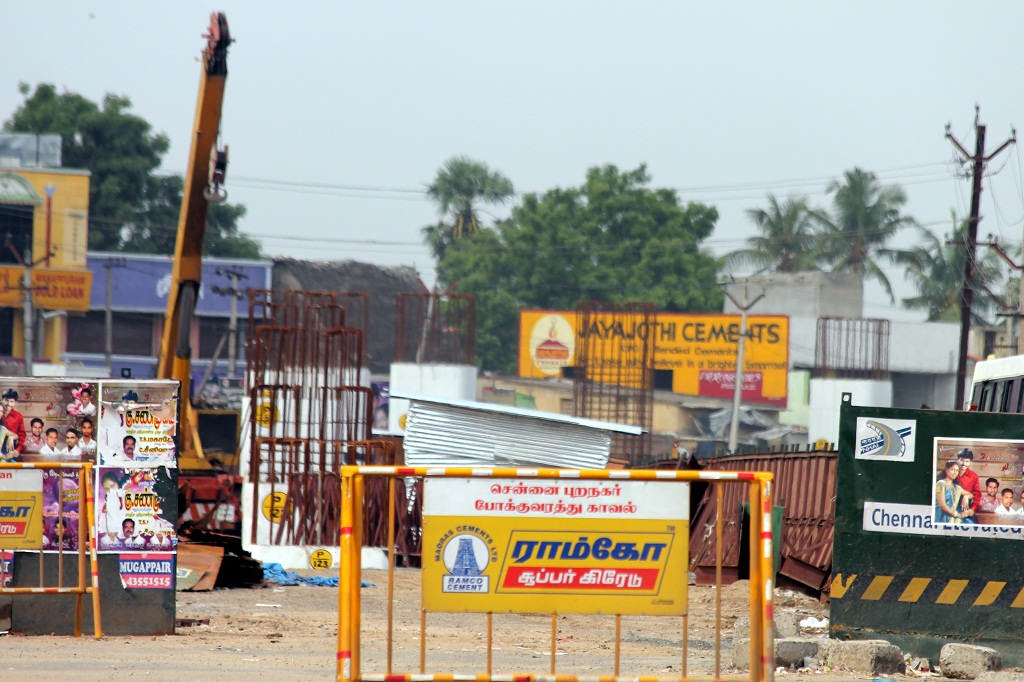
Near Maduravoyal grade separator.

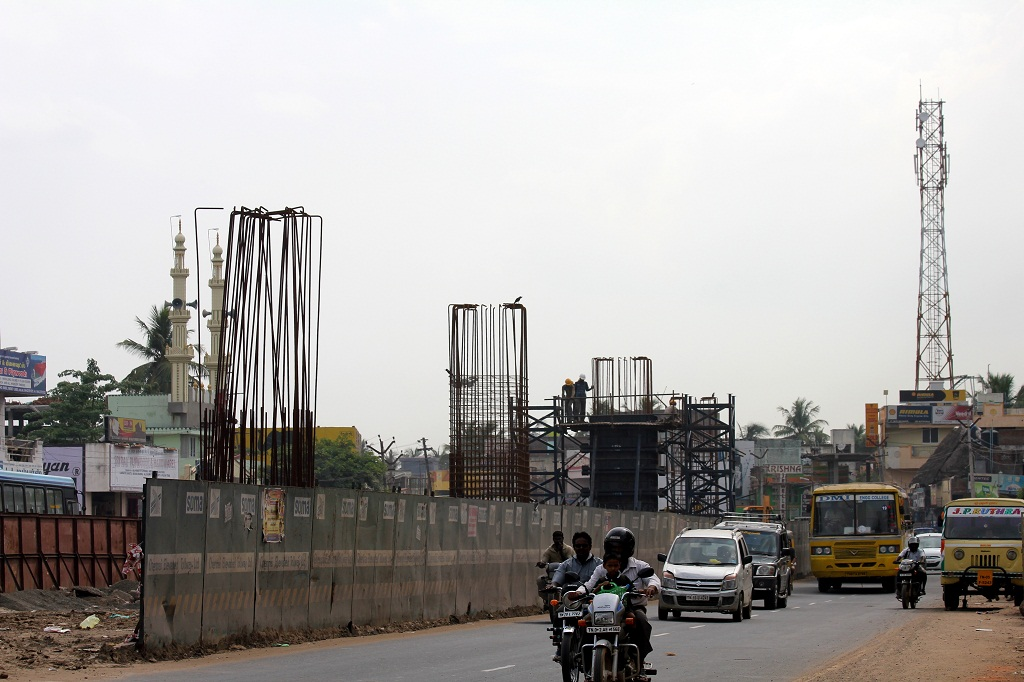

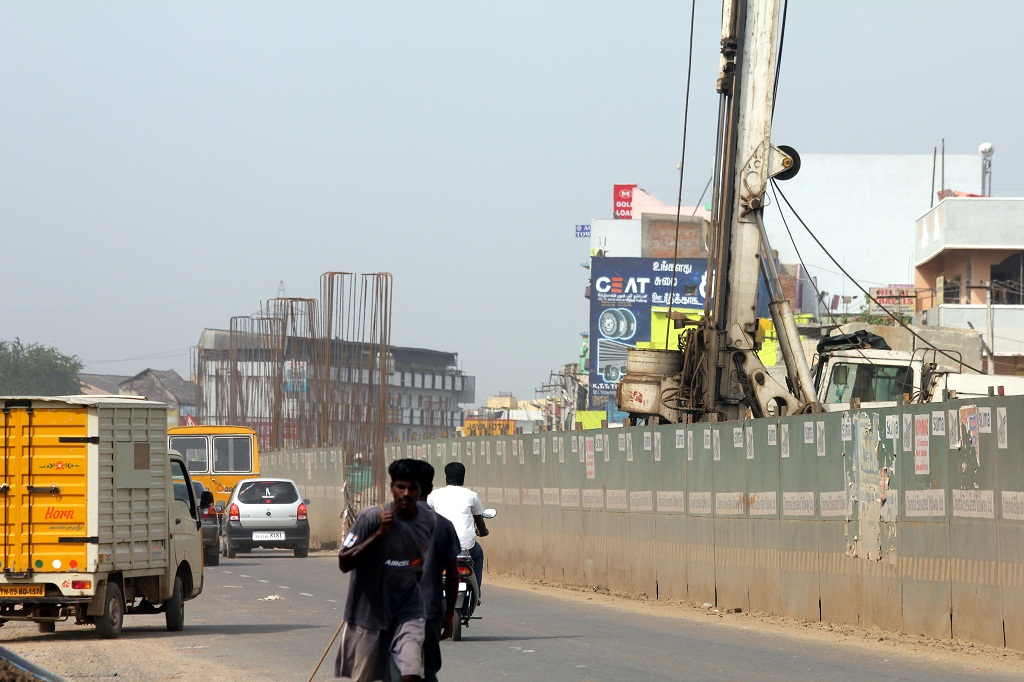
