= Irumbuliyur Junction =

Junction in the city of Chennai, India

Coordinates: 12.915555°N 80.102767°E

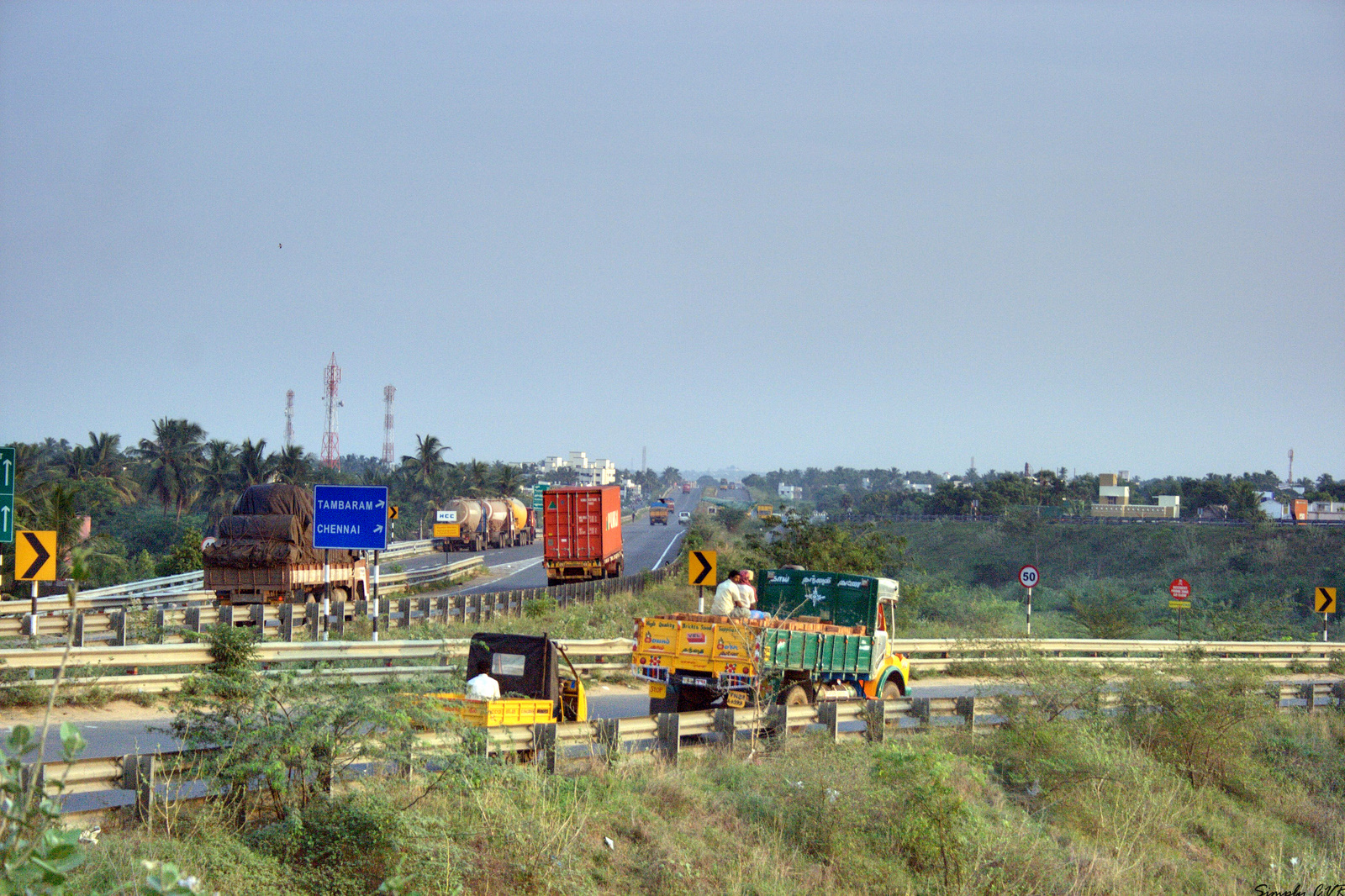
Flyover at Irumbiliyur, faces huge traffic jams everyday

Irumbuliyur Junction is one of the important junctions in the city of Chennai, India. It is located at Irumbuliyur near Tambaram in Chennai at the intersection of NH 45 with the Chennai Bypass.

The Educational institution such as Nursing & schools functioning in Irumbuliyur since 1993 and 1987 under the name of Anbarasu School of Nursing and Tagore Matriculation School to cater the educational need of local public. The highway and the railway line divide the town into East Tambaram and West Tambaram.

The neighbourhood is served by the Tambaram railway station of the Chennai Suburban Railway Network. The main road through West Tambaram connects the districts of Lakshmi Nagar, Krishna Nagar, Bharathi Nagar, Old Perungalathur, Madhana Puram and Mudichur, ending at the Vandaloor - Oragadam road. West Tambaram has been growing rapidly since the development of the Vandaloor-Nemilichery Outer Ring Road. The narrow Irumbiliyur flyover and the railway bridge create huge traffic jams.

Supermarkets in West Tambaram include Heritage, Reliance Fresh and Nilgiris are in West Tambaram. Banks include SBI, Canara Bank, Axis Bank, ICICI Bank, Indian Overseas Bank, and Indian Bank

== 3-tier interchange ==
A three tier interchange has been built to ease the flow of traffic between Chennai bypass and NH 45. It has 3 levels

- Level "-1" for traffic from Tambaram to Maduravoyal.
- Level "0" for traffic from Chengalpattu to Tambaram and Maduravoyal, from Tambaram to Chengalpattu and from Maduravoyal to Tambaram.
- Level "+1" for traffic from Maduravoyal to Chengalpattu.

== Famous holiday places ==
- Vandalur Zoo 4 km
- Kishkinta Amusement park 8 km
- Kovalam Beach 25 km
- Queensland Amusement park 19 km
- Childrens park 24 km
- Nanganallur Anjaneya temple 15 km
- Marina Beach 32 km
