= Velachery twin flyovers =

Flyover in India

Velachery Twin Flyovers

Location
- Chennai, India
- Roads at junction: Velachery Bypass Road; Vijayanagar Junction

Construction
- Type: Flyover
- Lanes: 2
- Constructed: Under construction
- Opened: TBC

Velachery twin flyovers is a set of two L-shaped flyovers at the Vijayanagar Junction in the neighbourhood of Velachery in Chennai, India. It was constructed at a cost of ₹ 1080 million.

== History and design ==
The plan for the flyovers was first proposed in 2010. The first-level flyover connects the Velachery Bypass Road with the Velachery–Tambaram Road near the Velachery MRTS station. This flyover has 15 spans and lands around 190 meters ahead of the MRTS bridge. The second-level flyover connects the Taramani Link Road and the Velachery Bypass Road. It is 1,200 meters long and has 32 spans. The central span of this flyover is the longest of all, at 40 meters length, right above the Vijayanagar junction. The height of the second flyover is 15 meters.

== Traffic ==
As of 2010, the junction had a traffic density of 13,000 vehicles daily during peak hours. About 522 bus services are operated from the Vijayanagar terminus at the junction every day by the Chennai Metropolitan Transport Corporation.

== See also ==
- Flyovers in Chennai
