= Broken Bridge, Chennai =

Bridge in Chennai, India

Coordinates: 13.0125°N 80.2759°E

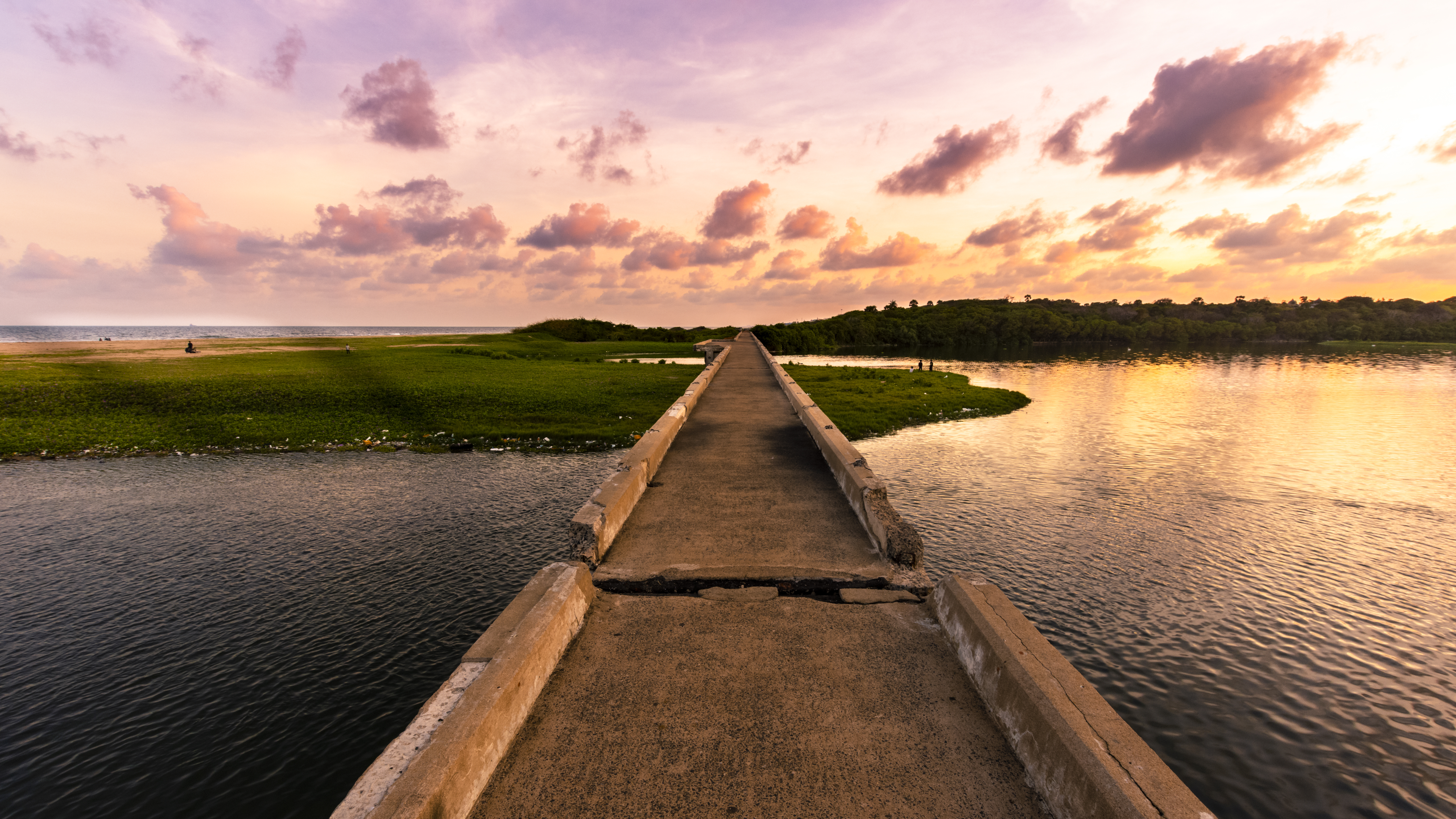
- Crosses: Adyar River
- Locale: Chennai, Tamil Nadu, India

Location
- Interactive map of Broken Bridge, Chennai

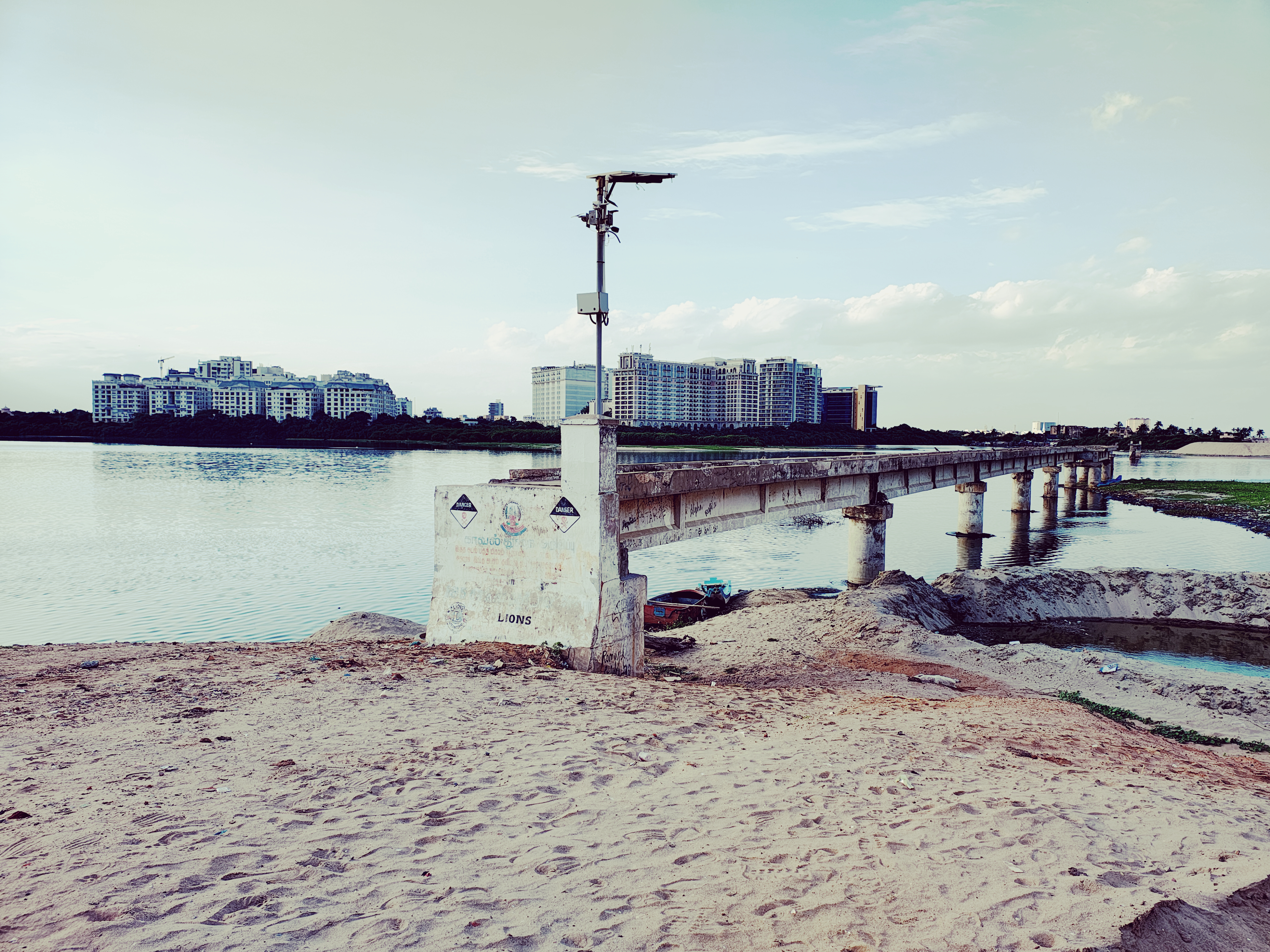
Broken Bridge - Adyar River

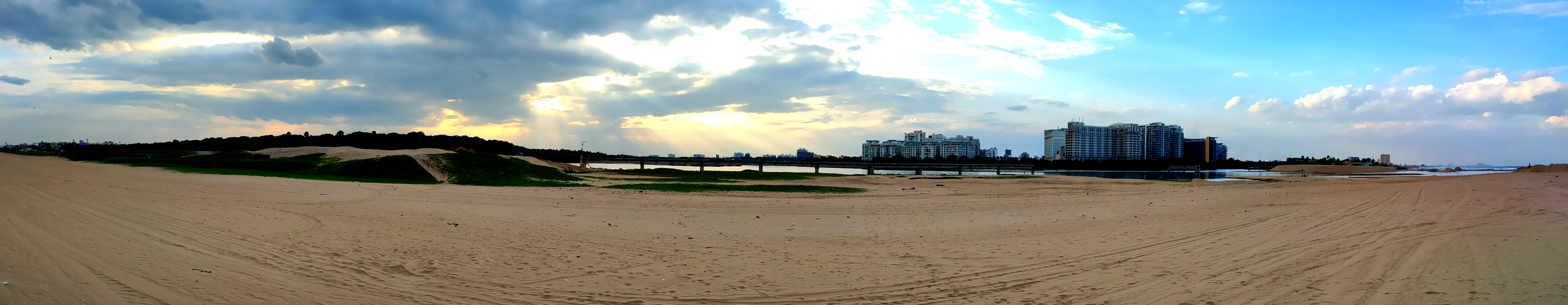
Broken Bridge Beach

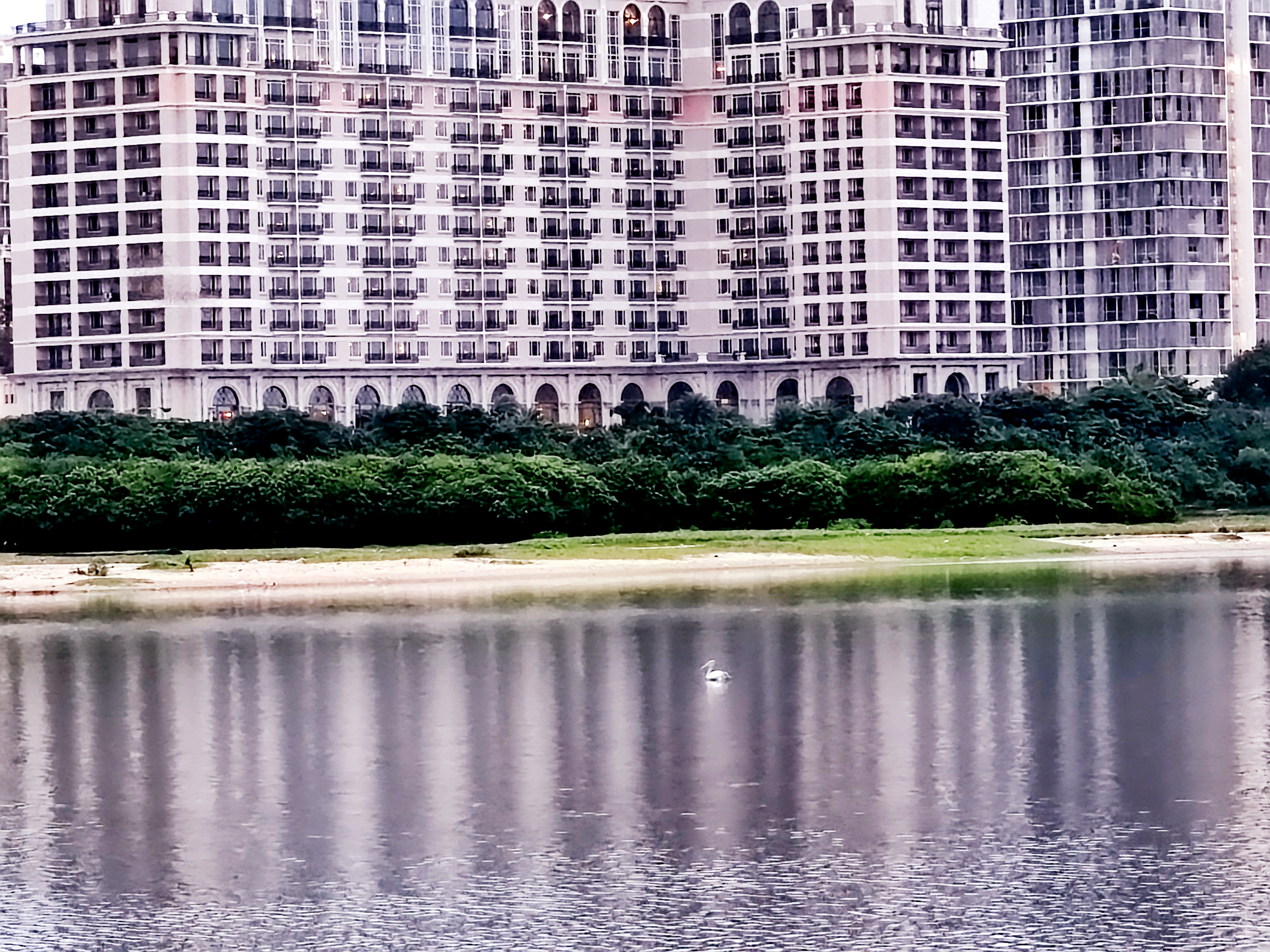
Pelican in Adyar River Estuary viewed from Broken Bridge

Broken Bridge is a bridge to nowhere, located in Chennai. The single lane bridge spanning the Adyar estuary, was built in 1967, to facilitate the movement of people from Pattinapakkam to Besant Nagar's Elliot's Beach. In 1977, the bridge partly collapsed due to strong currents of the river and has never been repaired. The bridge is a popular spot for film shootings and has featured in films like Rickshawkaran, Vaalee, and Aaytha Ezhuthu.

== See also ==
- Architecture of Chennai
- Heritage structures in Chennai
