= Chennai Bypass Road =

Road in India

- Chennai Bypass Road in red
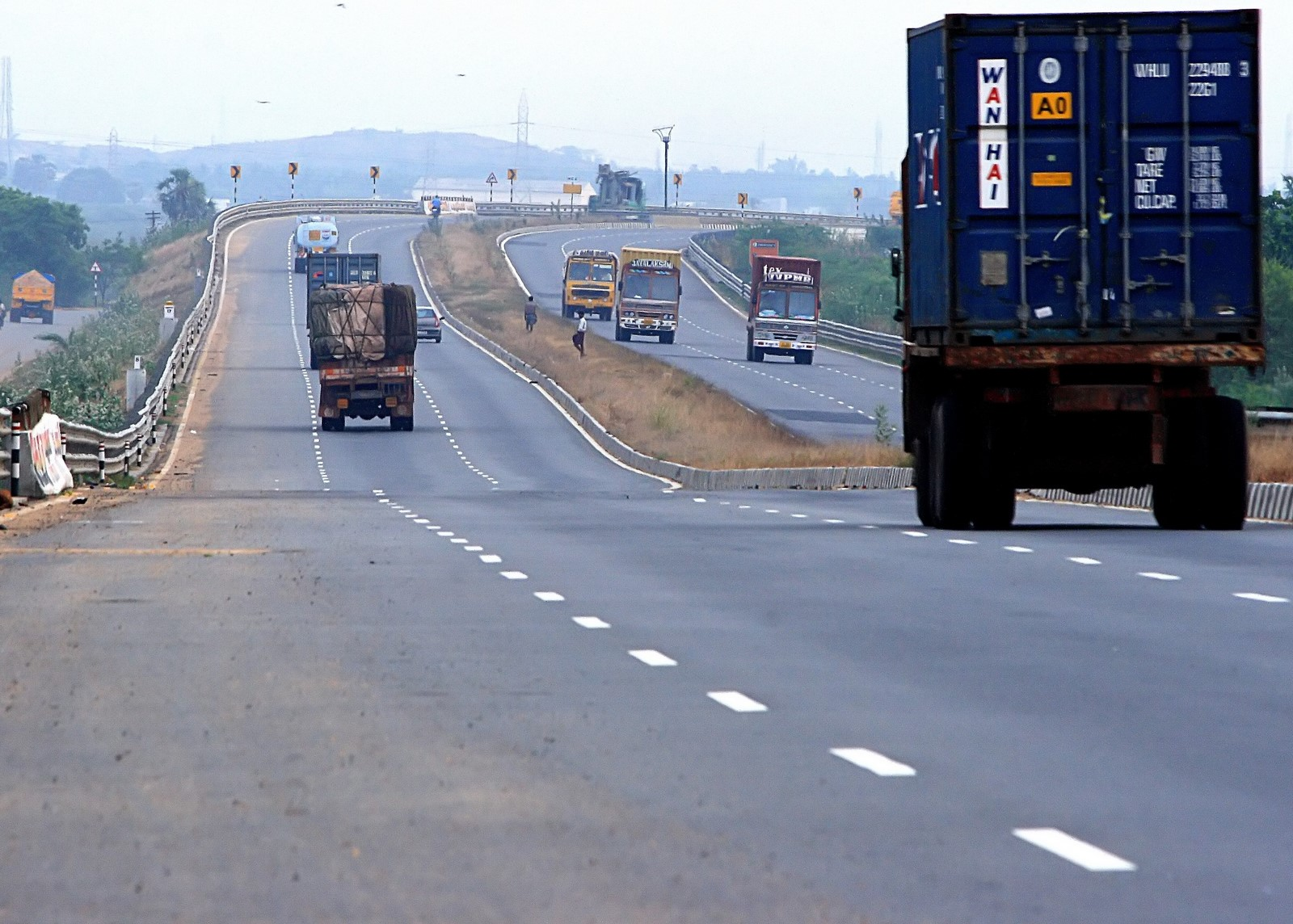

Route information
- Part of AH20
- Maintained by National Highways Authority of India (NHAI)
- Length: 32 km (20 mi)
- Existed: 2010–present

Major junctions
- From: Puzhal, Chennai district
- To: Perungalathur Chennai City, Chengalpattu district

Location
- Country: India
- Major cities: Maduravoyal, Ambattur, Porur Chennai City

Highway system
- Roads in India; Expressways; National; State; Asian
- Chennai HSCTC

The Chennai Bypass Road is a full-access controlled expressway that interconnects four radial Indian National Highways around Chennai, India covering a distance of 32 km (20 mi) from Perungalathur (near Tambaram) on NH-32 to puzhal on NH-16 via Maduravoyal at a cost of ₹ 4.05 billion. Constructed as part of the National Highway Development Project to decongest the city of transiting vehicles, the expressway interconnects NH-32, NH-48, NH-716 and NH-16. This expressway now forms a part of the circular transportation corridor.

== Phases ==
=== Phase I ===
The first phase is a 19 km (12 mi) six-lane fully access controlled carriageway from Perungalathur on the Grand Southern Trunk Road (NH 32) to Maduravoyal which lies on the Chennai–Bengaluru NH-48. A 3-tier trumpet interchange has also been constructed at the starting point at Irumbuliyur. It was inaugurated in April 2008. The road runs through Thiruneermalai, Pammal, Anakaputhur, Tharapakkam, Kovur, Porur, Vanagaram to reach Maduravoyal.

=== Phase II ===
The second phase include extending the bypass by 13 km (8.1 mi) from Maduravoyal to Puzhal on the Chennai–Kolkata NH16 and four-laning it. It also includes two interchanges. There are a clover-leaf grade separator at Maduravoyal Junction and a trumpet interchange at Puzhal where the bypass phase II ends.

==== Elevated road ====
A 3.2 kilometres (2.0 mi) elevated six-lane corridor forms the part of Phase II being executed currently. This elevated road cuts through the industrial estate in Ambattur. This corridor ends with a road over bridge (RoB) crossing the Chennai–Jolarpet railway line. The elevated corridor was completed in June 2009 at a cost of ₹ 1000 million.

== Interchanges ==
- A 3-tier interchange connecting NH32 at Irumbuliyur. This place is where the bypass begins.
- An elevated cloverleaf interchange at Maduravoyal to connect it with the Chennai Port–Maduravoyal Expressway and the proposed Maduravoyal–Sriperumbudur dry port expressway
- A trumpet interchange at Puzhal

== Gallery ==
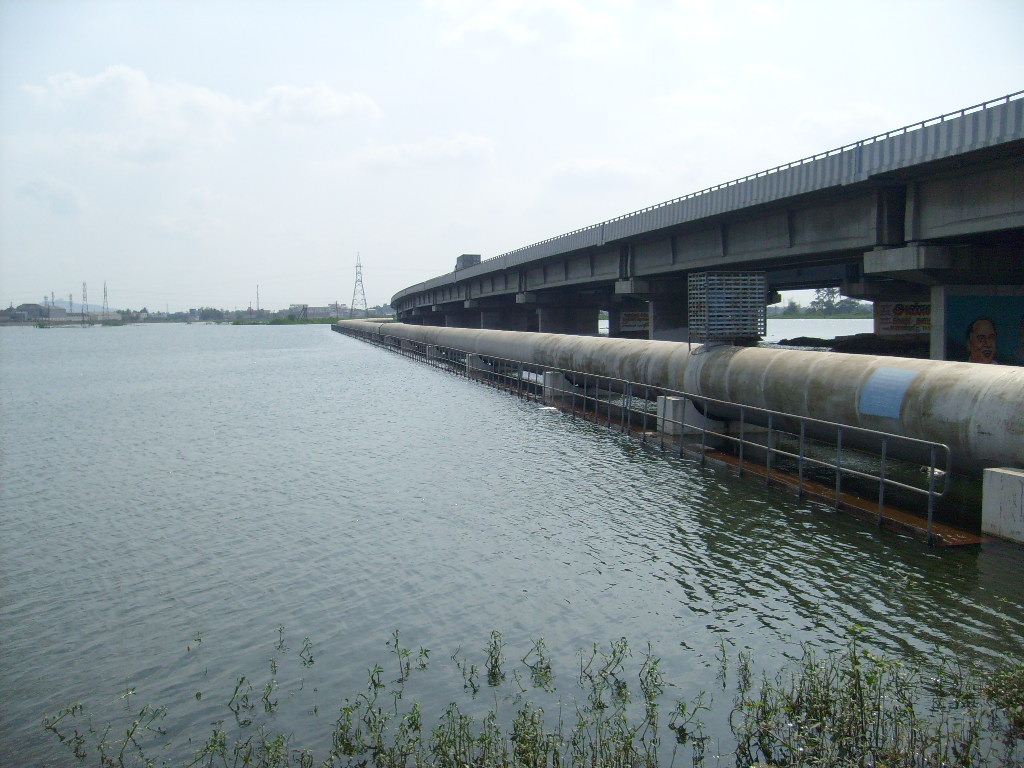
The Porur flyover section of Phase I of the Chennai bypass passing through Porur Lake

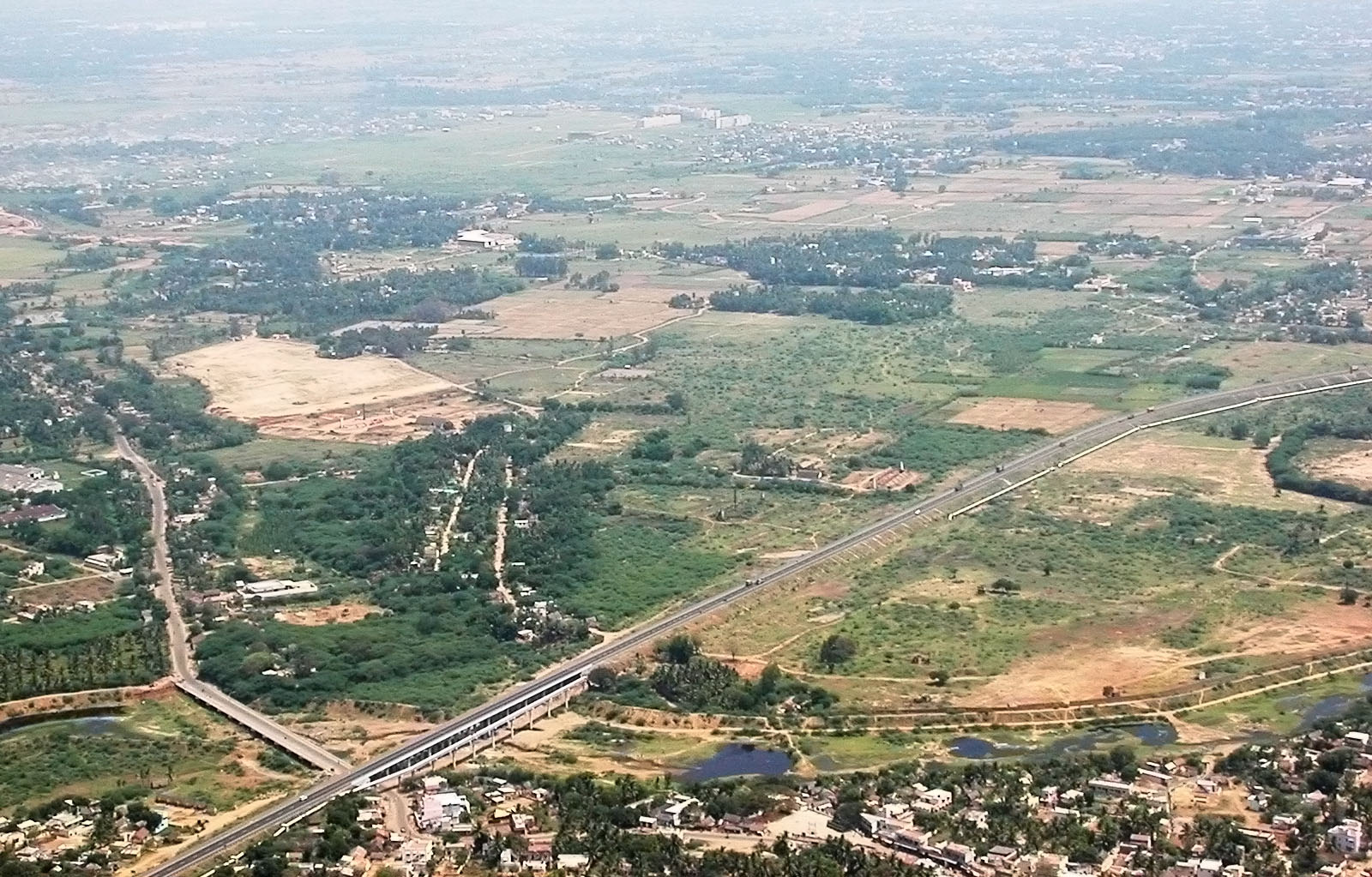
The expressway passes through the outskirts of Chennai.

== See also ==
- Coimbatore Bypass Road
