= Chennai Elevated Expressways =

Route information
- History: Scheduled for completion in 2019–2020

Location
- Country: India
- Major cities: Chennai

Highway system
- Roads in India; Expressways; National; State; Asian
- Chennai HSCTC

Chennai Elevated Expressways is a road network development scheme of the Second Master Plan by CMDA for Chennai city, India.

== Corridors ==
Five elevated corridors have been proposed as a medium-term scheme.

| Type | Along/across | From | To | via | Length (km) | Cost in INR crores (estimated) | Status |
|---|---|---|---|---|---|---|---|
| Elevated road | Arcot Road | Vadapalani | Porur | Saligramam | | 300 | |
| Elevated road | Thiruvottiyur High Road | Tollgate | Ernavur Bridge | | | 250 | |
| Elevated road | Rajaji Salai | Parrys Corner | Tollgate | | | 350 | |
| Elevated road | Nungambakkam High Road | | | Valluvar Kottam High Road, Mc. Nichols High Road, College Road and Haddows Road | | 300 | |
| Elevated road | GST | Chennai Port | Tambaram | | | 1400 | |

The following 12 corridors have been proposed in the long term scheme

| Type | Along/across | From | To | via | Length (km) | Cost in INR crores (estimated) | Status |
|---|---|---|---|---|---|---|---|
| Elevated freight corridor | | Ennore Port (Northern Gate) | NH5 | Tachur | | 100.68 | |
| Elevated freight corridor | | Ennore Port (Northern Gate) | TPP (Thiruvottiyur Ponneri-Panjetty Road) | Vallur | | 142.98 | |
| Elevated freight corridor | Beach | Ennore Port | Chennai Port | | | 1500 | |
| Elevated road | Anna Salai | | | | | 750 | |
| Elevated road | EVR Salai | | | | | 600 | |
| Elevated road | Kamarajar Salai | | | | | 480 | |
| Elevated road | Rajiv Gandhi Salai (IT Expressway) | | | | | 900 | |
| Elevated road | Arcot Road | | | | | 360 | |
| Elevated road | | Aminjikarai | Sterling Road | | | 225 | |
| Elevated road | Kathivakkam High Road | | | | | 600 | |
| Elevated road | Thiruvottiyur High Road | Monroe Statue | Manali | | | 600 | |
| Elevated road | NH45 | Kathipara | Tambaram | | | 1350 | |

* Revised cost during tender process.

== Other corridors ==
Apart from the Master Plan, other corridors are being planned by the Corporation of Chennai, Chennai Port Trust and Ennore Port Trust. The following are the details of these elevated roads.

| Type | Along/across | From | To | via | Length (km) | Cost in INR crores (estimated) | Status |
|---|---|---|---|---|---|---|---|
| Elevated freight corridor | NH4 | Maduravoyal | Sriperumbudur Dry Port | | 20 (approx) | | Pre-feasibility study under process |
| Elevated road | Sardar Patel Road | Halda | Madhya Kailash Junction | | 3.6 (approx) | 100 | Proposed under JNNURM |
