= Koyambedu Junction =

Bridge in India

Coordinates: 13.0761°N 80.1992°E

Koyambedu Junction, also called the Koyambedu Roundtana, is an important road junction in Chennai, Tamil Nadu, India. It is located north of the Chennai Mofussil Bus Terminus at the junction of the Inner Ring Road and the Poonamallee High Road (NH4) in the Koyambedu area/locality. The junction is a part of the Golden Quadrilateral project taken up under the National Highways Development Project.

== Grade separator ==
An elevated Parclo interchange has been constructed by the National Highways Authority of India to decongest the junction which is heavily utilised by interstate buses. This design of parclo grade separator has three arms of the cloverleaf interchange. The construction of the flyover was delayed due to problems in acquiring land that was owned by Tamil Nadu MLA Vijayakanth.

Koyambedu Junction intersects two major roads, viz. Poonamallee High Road (NH 4) and the Inner Ring Road (Jawaharlal Nehru Road).

== Landscaping ==
In 2013, the highways department begun work to landscape the 20,000 sq m space at a cost of ₹ 11 million.

Landscaping work has been completed. Rest of the interchanges in Chennai are also being planned to get landscaping similar to the one which is there at Koyambedu Interchange.

== Surveillance ==
In 2019, a police surveillance booth was constructed under the grade separator to patrol the surroundings. It is staffed by four police personnel with assistance from a regular police patrol team.

== See also ==
- Kathipara Junction
- Padi Junction
- Maduravoyal Junction
