= Padi Junction =

Bridge in India

Padi - Lucas Elevated Rotary

Location
- Chennai, India
- Roads at junction: Inner Ring Road; Chennai-Tiruvallur High Road

Construction
- Type: Elevated rotary
- Spans: 100
- Lanes: 4
- Constructed: 2005–09 by National Highway Authority of India
- Opened: 20 February 2009

The Padi Lucas Junction is the intersection of Chennai-Thiruvallur High Road and Inner Ring Road in the city of Chennai and is one of the most important junctions in the city. It is located in Anna Nagar north of Koyambedu Junction. An elevated rotary has been constructed at this junction as part of the NHDP by NHAI to ease the traffic congestion. It was built at a cost of ₹ 1,300 million and was opened for traffic on 20 February 2009.

== Grade separator ==
The junction is used by hundreds of heavy vehicles and the road has a traffic density of about 200,000 passenger car units daily. As of 2014, more than 70,000 vehicles use the Padi flyover every day. To ease the congestion, the NHAI has constructed an elevated four-lane rotary at the junction. Work on the project began in 2005 and completed in 2009.

Ramps A total of six ramps and an elevated rotary with 100 spans form part of the elevated structure.

Along IRR

- Four ramps on each side of the IRR and on both sides of the grade separator.
- The ramps are all two-laned and are for One-way traffic.

Along MTH Road

- Two ramps along the median of the MTH road on both sides of the grade separator.
- The two ramps on MTH road are all four-laned with a median for two-way traffic.
- The ramp on the north of the grade separator on MTH road crosses a railway line.
- An elevated 4-laned rotary at the center connects all the 6 ramps and has an outer radius of 99 metres.

== Landscaping ==
There is a 15,000 sq m space around the grade separator where landscaping works will be taken up in 2013 at a cost of ₹ 10 million.

== See also ==
- Koyambedu Junction
- Kathipara Junction
- Maduravoyal Junction
