= Maduravoyal Junction =

Bridge in India

Coordinates: 13.061294°N 80.161062°E

Maduravoyal Junction is an important junction in Chennai. It is located to the west of Koyambedu Junction at the intersection of National Highway 4 (India) (NH4) and Chennai Bypass.

== Maduravoyal Grade Separator ==
A Cloverleaf interchange was constructed at this junction similar to the one in Kathipara Junction by the National Highways Authority of India (NHAI) as part of the ₹ 4050-million Chennai Bypass project (Phase II). The construction of the flyover was completed in June 2010. The project was delayed because of the loose soil at the junction. It was rectified by erecting pillars. The flyover has four loops that coalesce in a clover-shaped structure. The loops are available for vehicles proceeding from Tambaram to Koyambedu, Poonamallee to Tambaram, Puzhal to Poonamallee, Koyambedu to Puzhal. The feature project maduravayol to thuraimugam (chennai port) parakkum thanga natkara salai is starting from maduravoyal.

== See also ==
- Koyambedu Junction
- Kathipara Junction
- Padi Junction
- Madhya Kailash Junction
