= Kathipara Junction =

Bridge in India

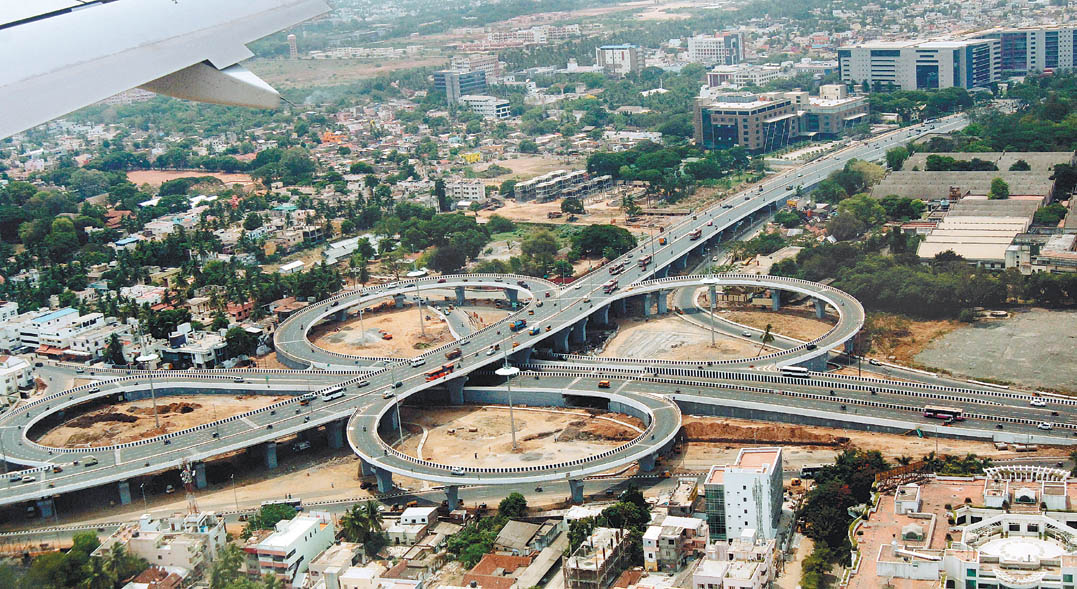
- As seen from above
- Interactive map of Kathipara Junction

Location
- Chennai, India
- Coordinates: 13.00727°N 80.20371°E
- Roads at junction: Grand Southern Trunk Road; Inner Ring Road; Anna Salai; Mount-Poonamallee Road

Construction
- Type: Cloverleaf interchange
- Lanes: 6
- Opened: 2008
- Maintained by: National Highway Authority of India

Kathipara Junction is a major interchange in Chennai, Tamil Nadu. Located in the Alandur area, four roads intersect at this junction: Grand Southern Trunk Road, Inner Ring Road, Anna Salai and Mount-Poonamallee Road. Kathipara Junction is the largest cloverleaf interchange in India and South Asia.

== Construction ==
The interchange was previously a roundabout with a statue of the Indian prime minister Jawaharlal Nehru. A cloverleaf interchange was constructed as part of the NHDP to ease traffic congestion at the junction. The structure was built at an estimated project cost of ₹486 crore (US$52 million) with an initial deadline of March 2007. It is the first of three grade-separated interchanges built on the Inner Ring Road to improve connectivity between the various National Highways radiating from the city; the other two are Koyambedu Junction and Padi Junction. The main span of the flyover connecting Inner Ring Road and Grand Southern Trunk Road was opened to traffic on 9 April 2008 and the remainder was opened to the public on 26 October 2008. Landscaping work worth ₹150 lakh (US$160,000) on an are spanning 40,000 square metres (9.9 acres) will completed after work on the Chennai Metro is finished.

== Kathipara Urban Square ==
Kathipara Urban Square is a metro rail initiative to build facilities under the clover leaf loops of the Kathipara Junction. It is being developed by a private contractor. The square consists of a bus terminal where MTC and other buses can stop to pick up and drop passengers, a play area for kids, a food court, an open air theater, retail shops, office space, washrooms, a vehicular parking facility, kiosks, ATMs and facilities for horticulture spread across an area of 54,400 square metres (13.4 acres).

This development is estimated to cost around ₹140 million and is funded by the Chennai Metropolitan Development Authority and implementation and maintenance will be taken care of by the Chennai Metro Rail.

== Gallery ==
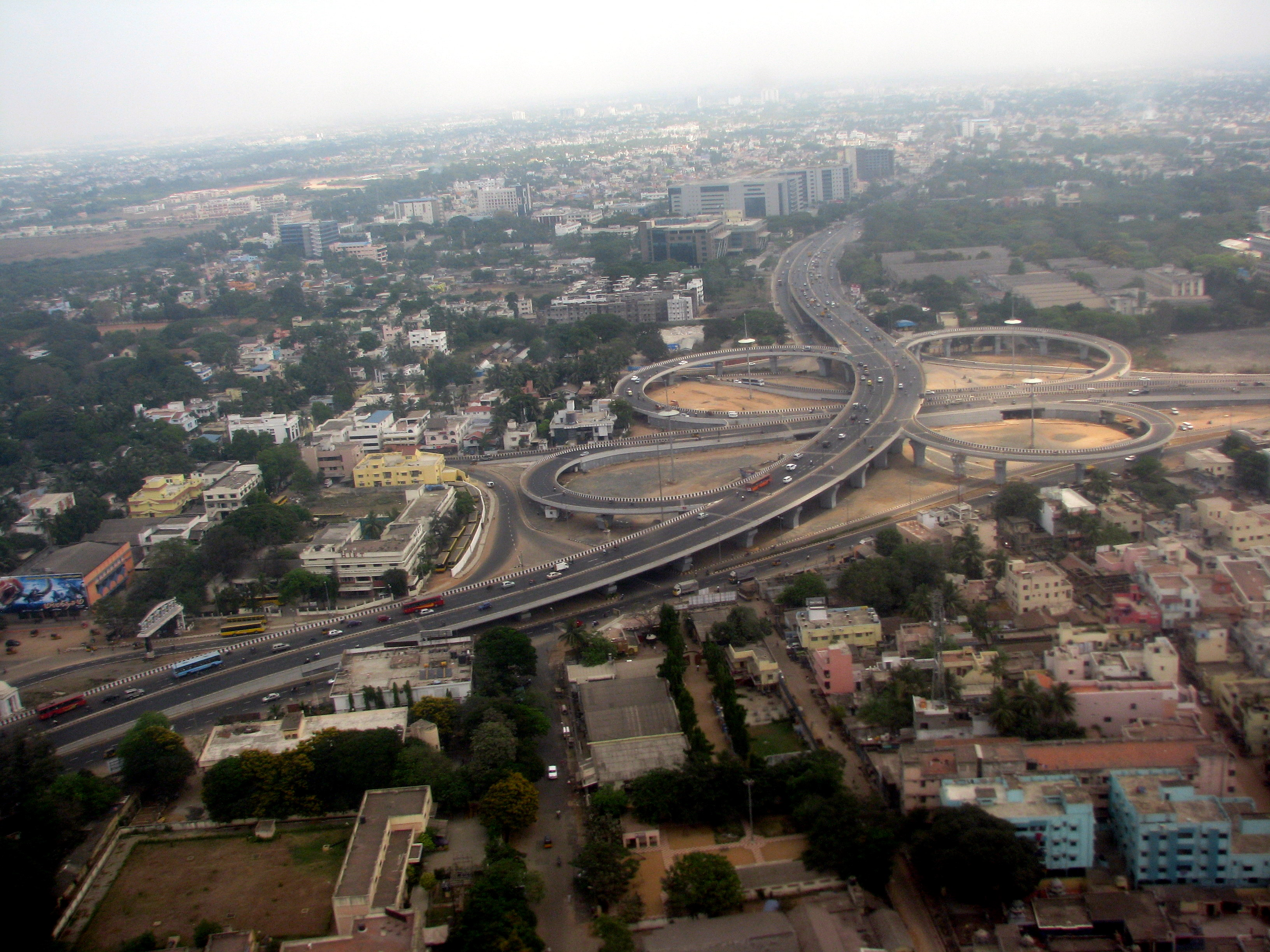
Kathipara Flyover, Chennai

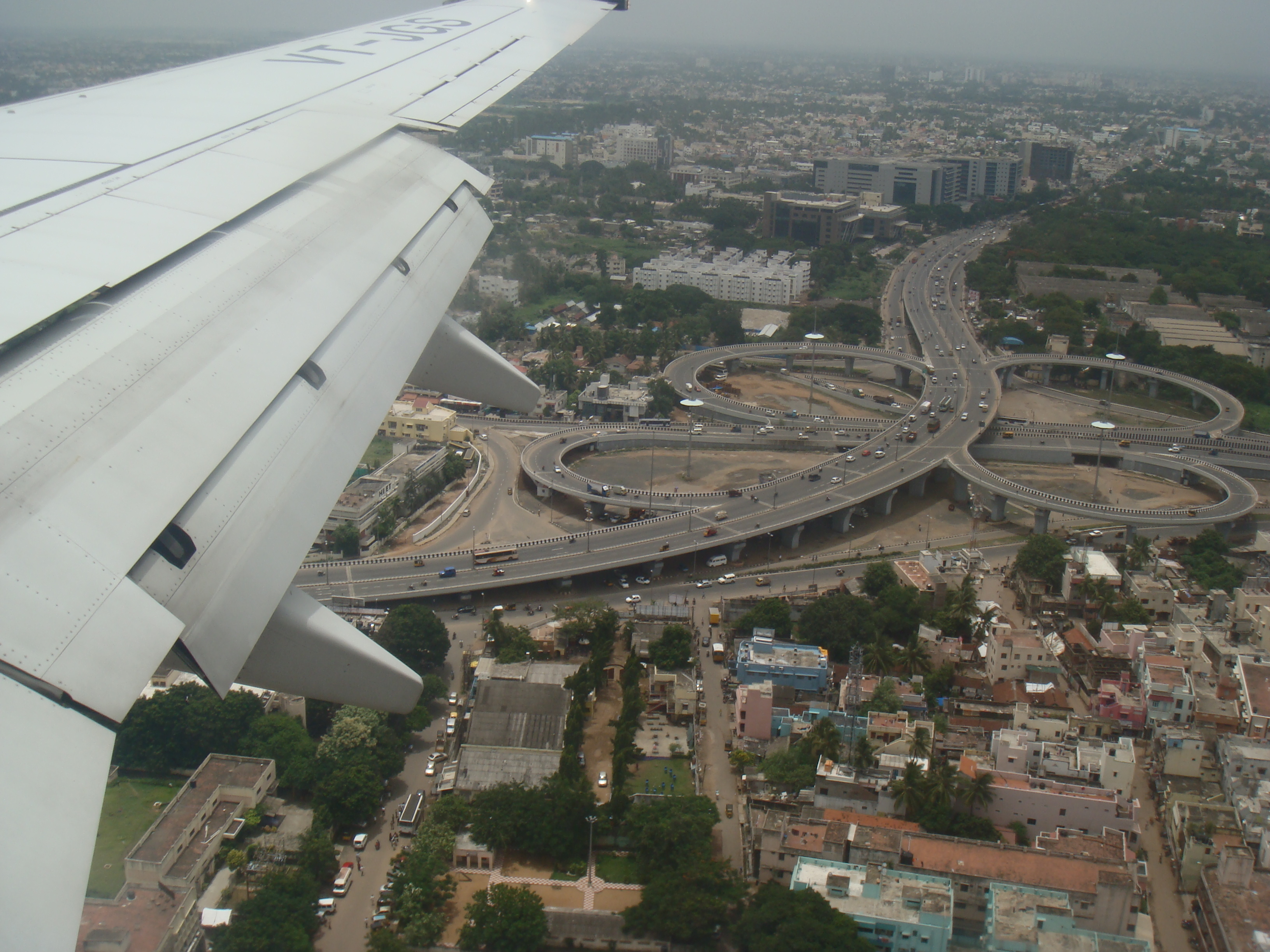
Kathipara Junction, Chennai, as seen from overhead

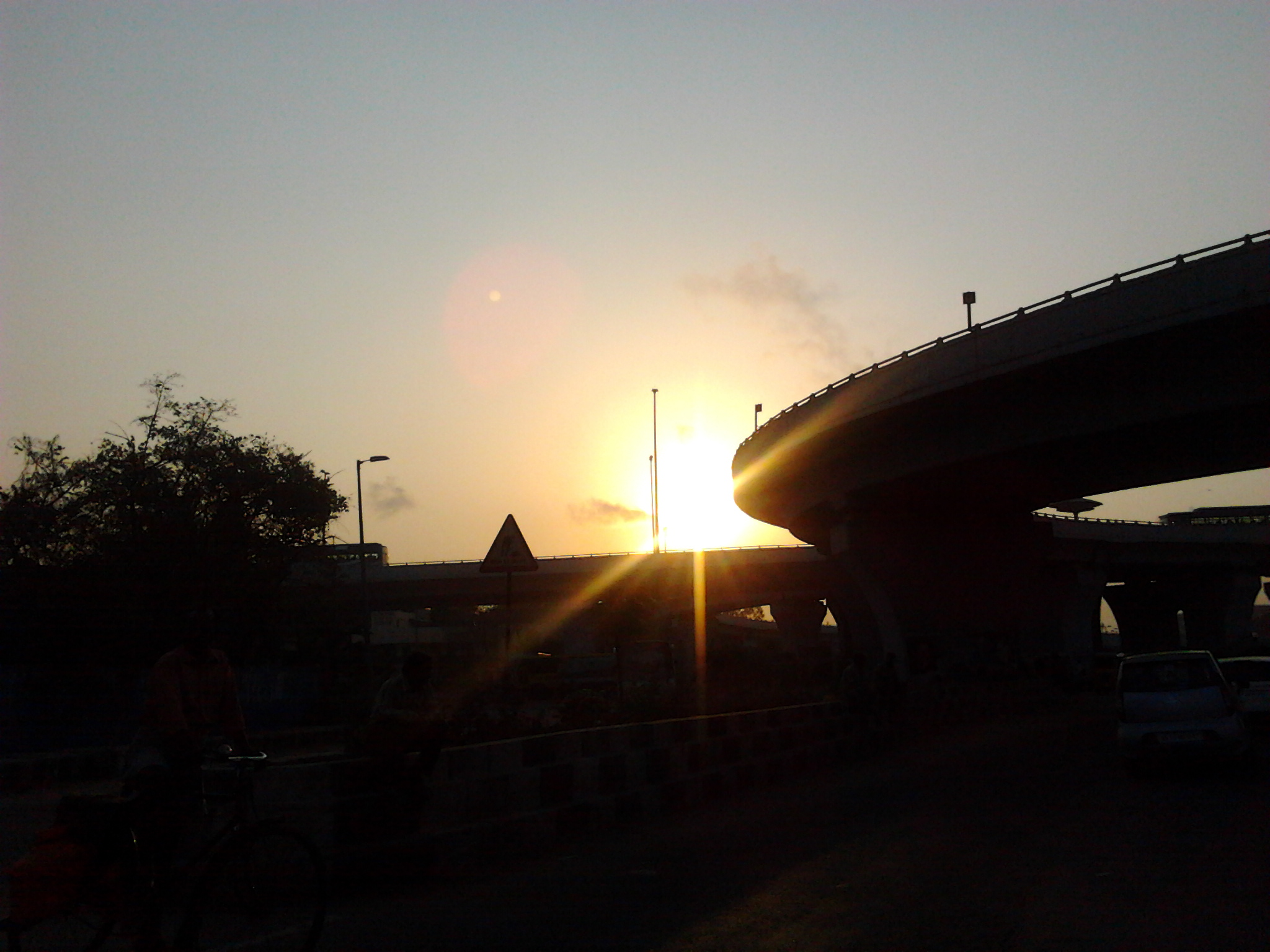
A ramp on the interchange

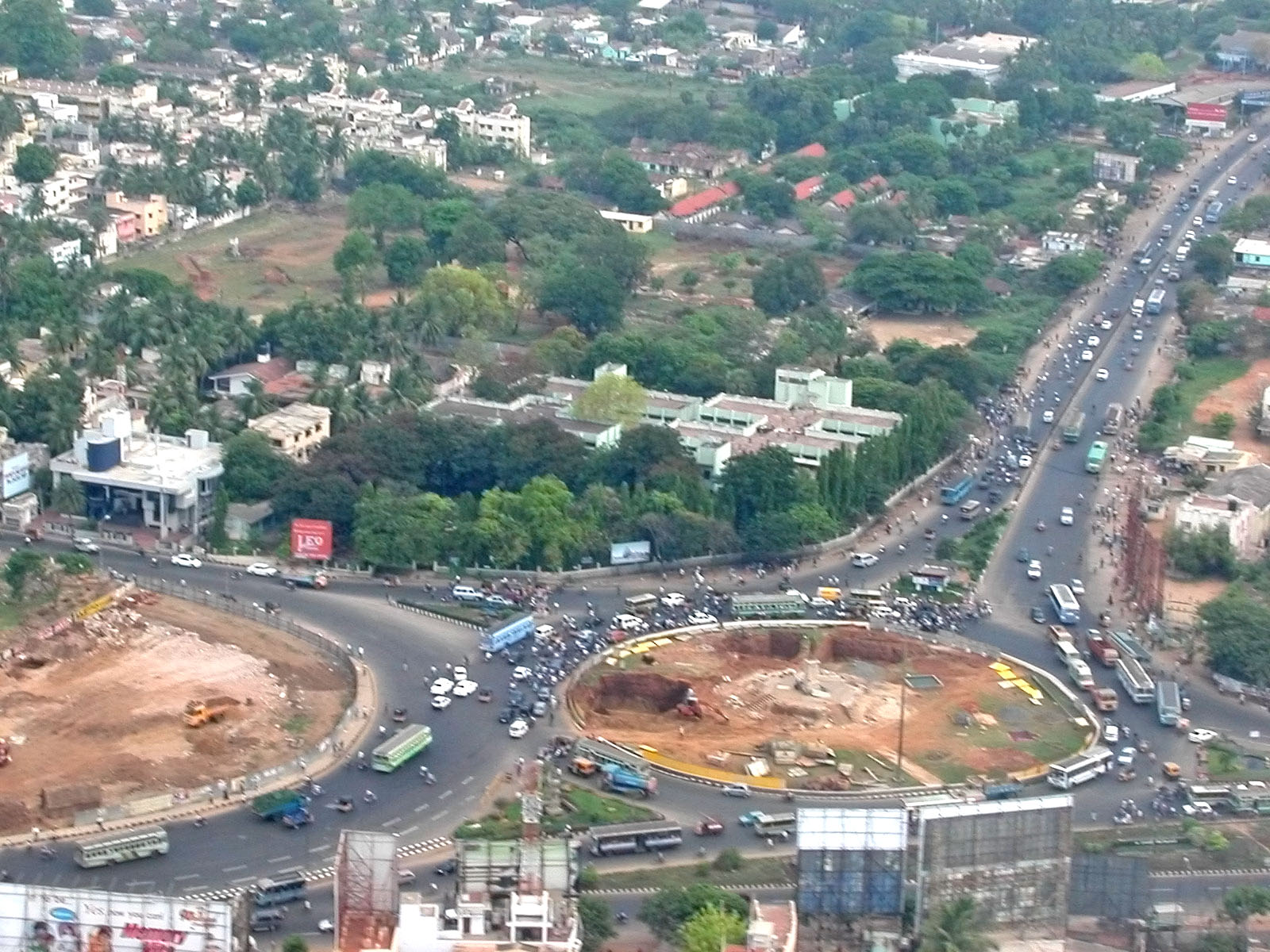
The predecessor roundabout junction located at the site prior to the construction of a cloverleaf interchange

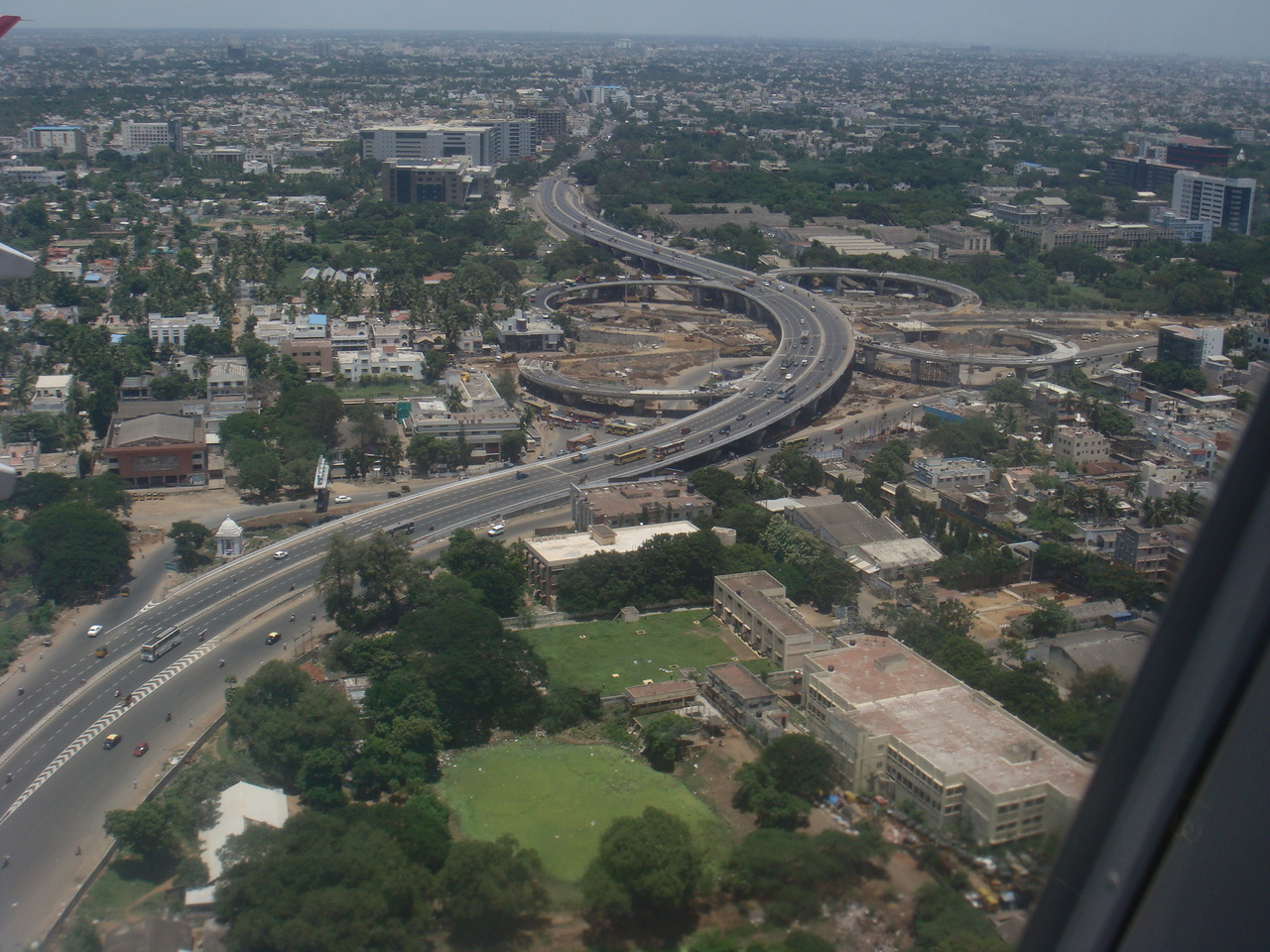
The main span of the flyover, shown alongside ramps being constructed at the time of this picture

== See also ==
- Koyambedu Junction
- Padi Junction
- Maduravoyal Junction
- Madhya Kailash Junction
