= State Bank of India Officers' Association =

Trade union in India

SBI Officers' Association
- Location: India
- Key people: Shri K. Santhanakrishnan

The State Bank of India Officers' Association (SBIOA) is a trade union for officers of the State Bank of India.

== History ==
Existing associations of head cashiers, sub-accountants, staff assistants, and staff officers merged in the 1960s to form the SBI Supervising Staff Association in Madras which was registered as a trade union on 14 August 1965. This merged with associations in Bombay, Delhi and Calcutta to form the All India State Bank Supervising Staff Federation, which became the current association.

== Chennai Circle ==
The State Bank of India Officers' Association (Chennai Circle) whose motto is Service before Self is a registered Trade Union of Officers, working in the three states of Tamil Nadu, Kerala and Pondicherry, in State Bank of India.

The then General Secretary of the association Mr. E.A. George Moses, founded the State Bank of India Officers Association Educational Trust in the year 1978 and established educational institutions for the benefit of the officers' children and later for serving the society. This service is given irrespective of caste, creed or colour.

=== Institutions ===
- SBOA School & Junior College - Anna Nagar Western Extension, Chennai; affiliated to CBSE
- SBOA Matriculation & Higher Secondary School - Anna Nagar Western Extension, Chennai; affiliated to Matriculation and Tamil Nadu State Board
- SBIOA Model Matric & Hr. Sec. School - Mogappair West, Chennai; affiliated to Matriculation and Tamil Nadu State Board
- SBOA Public (Sr. Sec.) School - Ernakulam, (Kochi); affiliated to CBSE
- SBOA Matriculation & Hr. Sec. School - Madurai; affiliated to Matriculation and Tamil Nadu State Board
- SBOA Matriculation and Higher Secondary School, Coimbatore - 641039; affiliated to Matriculation and Tamil Nadu State Board
- SBIOA Matriculation School - Tiruchirapalli; affiliated to Matriculation and Tamil Nadu State Board
- SBOA Center for Printing Technology, Anna Nagar Western Extn, Chennai
- SBOA Higher Academy of Research and Professional Enhancement, Anna Nagar Western Extn, Chennai
- SBOA Computer Academy, Anna Nagar Western Extension, Chennai

=== Current Officers Bearers of the trust ===
President : Sri. A.Nalla perumal pillai
Secretary & Correspondent : Sri. R.Balaji Treasurer : Sri. V.Manimaran
