= Anna Nagar =

Neighbourhood in Chennai district, Tamil Nadu, India

Anna Nagar Naduvankarai
- Neighbourhood
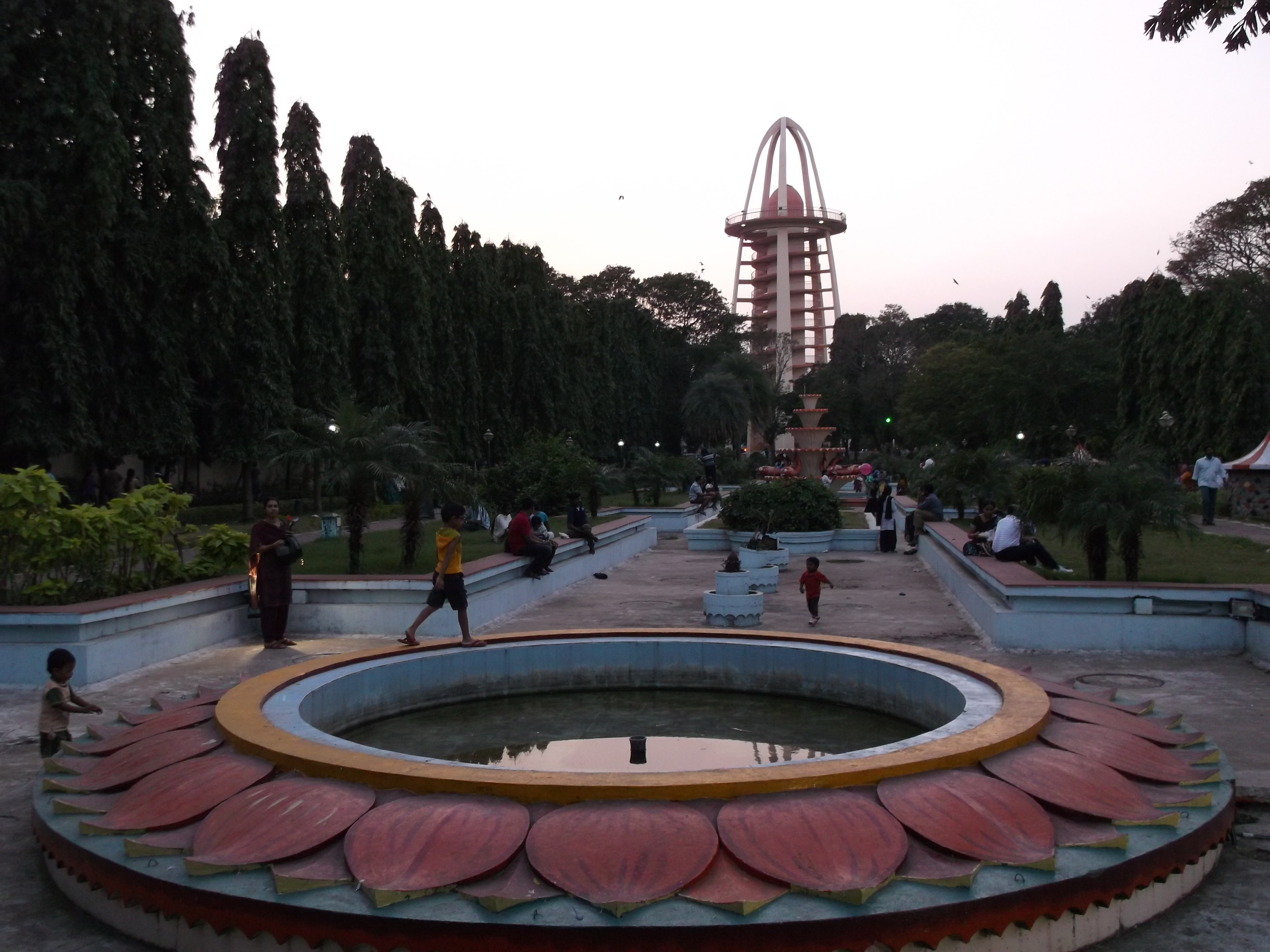
- Anna Nagar Tower Park in the neighbourhood

- Anna Nagar (Chennai) Anna Nagar (Tamil Nadu) Anna Nagar (India)
- Coordinates: 13.085000°N 80.210100°E
- Country: India
- State: Tamil Nadu
- District: Chennai
- Metro: Chennai
- Zone: Anna Nagar
- Ward: 100-102
- Named for: Arignar Anna

Area
  - Total: 5 km^{2} (1.9 sq mi)
- Elevation: 33 m (108 ft)

Languages
  - Official: Tamil
- Time zone: UTC+5:30 (IST)
- Vehicle registration: TN 02 (Chennai North West)
- Parliamentary constituency: Central Chennai
- MP: Dayanidhi Maran, DMK
- MLA: Ramkumar VK, TVK
- Assembly constituency: Anna Nagar
- Planning agency: CMDA

Anna Nagar (formerly known as Naduvakkarai), is a neighbourhood in the metropolitan city of Chennai, India. Named after former chief minister of Tamil Nadu C. N. Annadurai, it is located in the north-western part of Chennai and forms a part of the Aminjikarai taluk and the Anna Nagar Zone. It is one of the costliest and most sought after prime areas in Chennai and is home to several prominent doctors, civil officers, actors, lawyers and politicians. Real estate prices are among the highest in the city. A recent addition to the area is VR Chennai Mall, located near Shanthi Colony and Thirumangalam junction.

Anna Nagar is the first and the only neighbourhood in Chennai to follow a standard addressing system followed in the western world. One of the primary landmarks in Anna Nagar is the Anna Nagar Tower, built in 1968 as part of the World Trade Fair. Other important locations include the Anna Arch, Chinthamani, Blue Star, 14 shops, Shanthi Colony, Thirumangalam junction, Padi grade separator, Anna Nagar East, and the Anna Nagar West bus depot.

Anna Nagar has several established schools and colleges, places of worship, shopping areas with both independent shops and chain stores, and numerous restaurants. The 2nd avenue is an arterial road in Anna Nagar which has emerged as a hub for several restaurants and shops. There are also a number of midsize hospitals and nursing homes catering to the local population.

== History ==
Anna Nagar in 1972

Anna Nagar originated as a suburban village called Naduvakkarai. It was called Mullam Village.

Anna Nagar was developed by the Tamil Nadu Housing Board in the early 1970s following the World Trade Fair in the area in 1968. The board developed residential plots, apartments, commercial complexes, wide roads, school zones, bus terminus, and large parks.

== Geography ==
As of 2018, Anna Nagar zone had a green cover of more than 20 percent, as against the city's 14.9 percent average.

== Religion ==
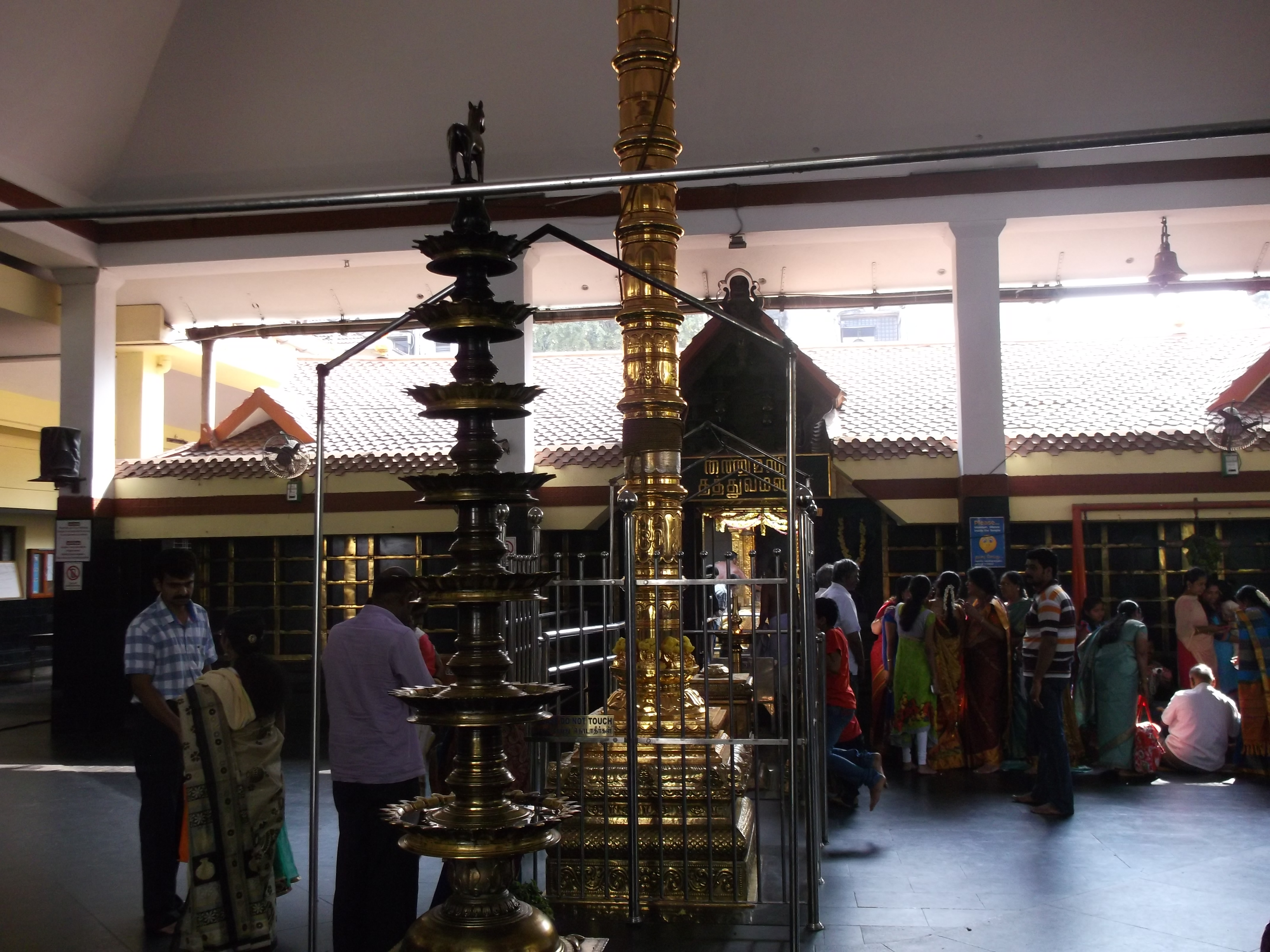
Ayyapan Temple

Several prominent temples, churches and mosques are located in Anna Nagar.

=== Temples ===
- Thirumani Amman Temple
- Shyam Mandir
- Balamurugan Temple
- Anna Nagar Ayyappa Temple
- Chandra Mouleeshwarar Thirukovil
- Arulmiga Mahakali Amman Temple
- Srinivasa Temple
- "Sai Sahara Samithi" - Sri Sathya Sai
- Siru Tirupathi – Perumal Temple
- Vetri Vinayagar Temple
- Sri Vallabha Viyanagar Temple
- Sri Palimaru Matha

=== Churches ===
- St. Luke's Church
- Shrine Of Divine Mercy
- Assembly Of God Church
- Don Bosco Shrine Centre
- Don Bosco Church
- CSI Redeemer Church Pastorate
- St. Thomas Jacobite Syrian Orthodox Church
- The Pentecostal Mission.

=== Mosques ===
- Masjid Javeed Pallivasal
- Masjid Thaqwa
- Madina Masjid
- Masjid Ul Jannah
- Masjid E Noor
- Masjid E Rahmaniah Villivakkam
- Masjid E Noor
- Masjid Al Noorul Madrasa

== Education ==
- Chinmaya Vidyalaya
- Jaigopal Garodia Vivekananda Vidyalaya
- Chennai Public School
- SBOA School & Junior College
- Valliammal Matriculation Higher Secondary School
- CSI Jessie Moses Matriculation Higher Secondary School
- Shri Krishnaswamy Matriculation Higher Secondary School
- Anna Adarsh Matriculation Higher Secondary School
- Kendriya Vidyalaya
- Aachi Global School

== Landmarks ==
=== Anna arch ===
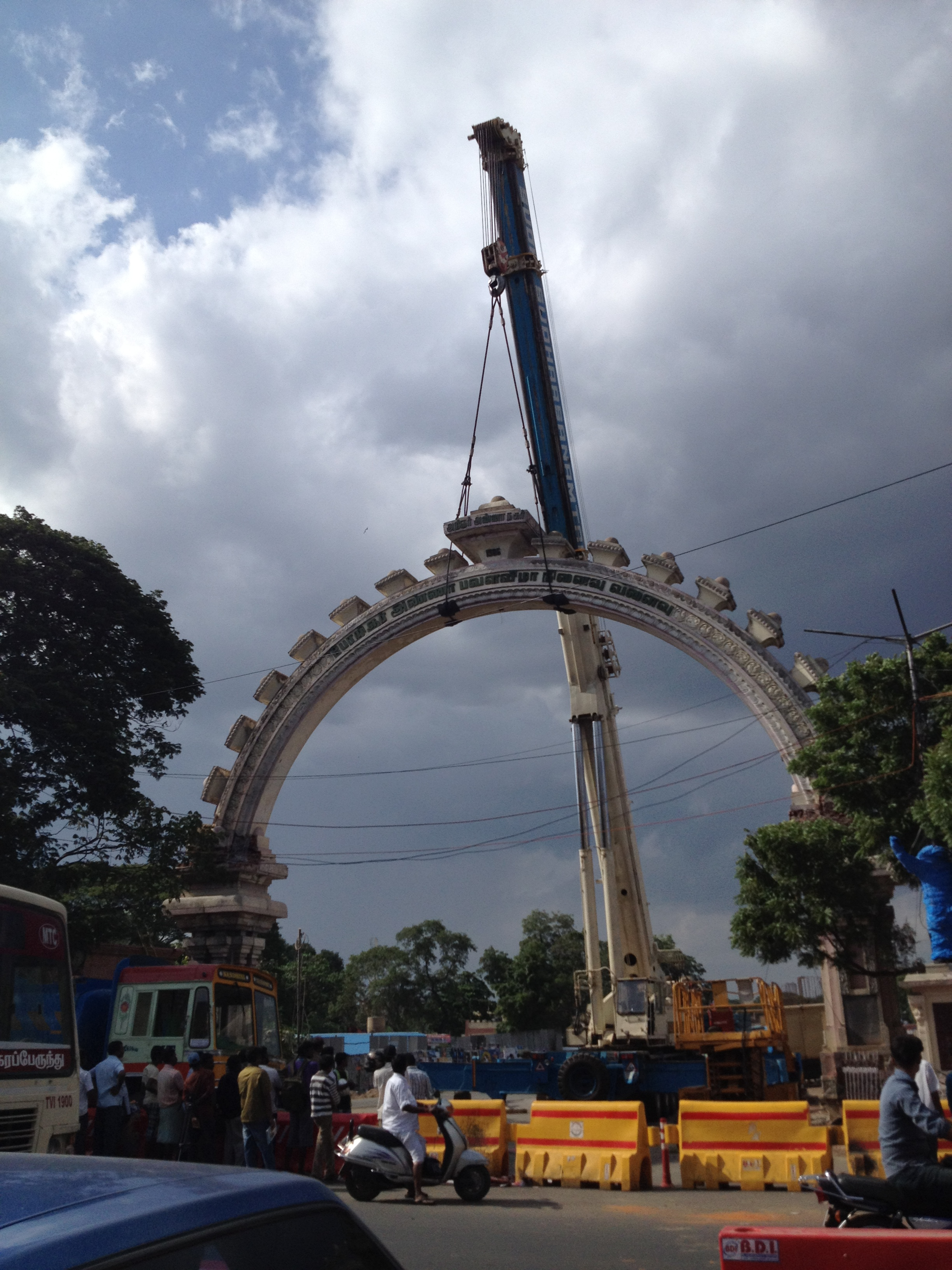
Anna Arch

A large twin arch called the Anna arch marks the entrance of the southern part of Anna Nagar on the Third Avenue, which was built in 1985 by the Corporation of Chennai at a cost of Rs. 1.2 million to commemorate the platinum jubilee celebrations of former chief minister C. N. Annadurai, when Anna Nagar was still a developing area. It was inaugurated by the then chief minister of Tamil Nadu, M. G. Ramachandran on 1 January 1986. Each arch stands 52 ft tall and weighs 82 tonnes. The road from the arch leads to the roundtana (roundabout) which is a major landmark and for all practical purposes, the centre of Anna Nagar.

In 2012, the arch was proposed to be demolished to leave way for a flyover that was planned to connect Anna Nagar with Aminjikarai. Demolition work began on 2 September 2012. However, the alignment of the flyover was modified slightly to prevent the removal of the arch, and the arch was restored at a cost of ₹ 6.4 million.

=== Anna Nagar Tower ===
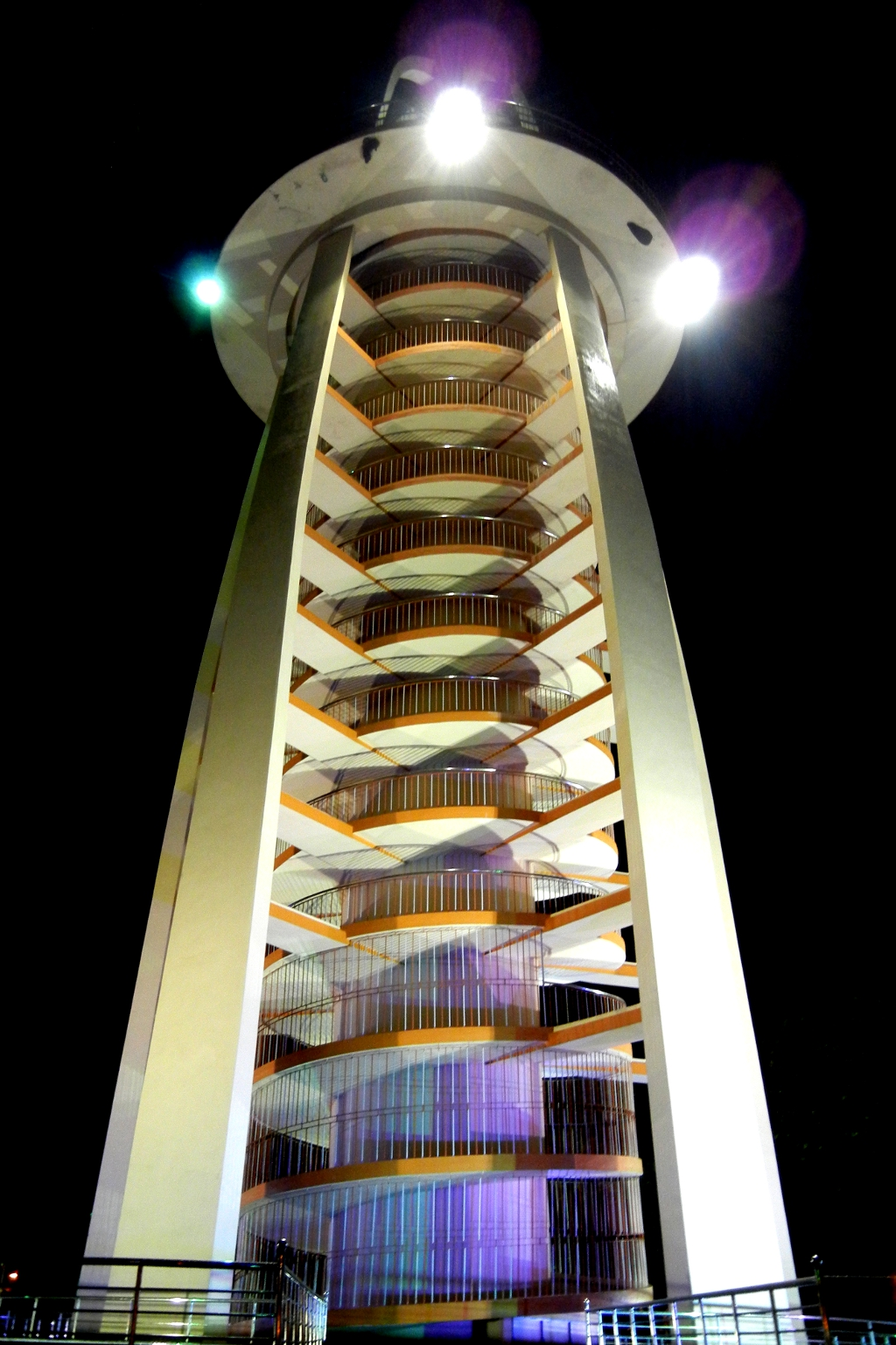
Anna Nagar Tower

The Anna Nagar Tower is a 138 feet (42 m) tall tower built for the 1968 World Trade Fair, by B. S. Abdur Rahman. Its main entrance is from the 3rd Main Road and a back entrance from the 6th main road. It is popular with morning walkers and joggers, and with families and young people in the evenings to play and relax. For a nominal fee, one could walk to the top of the tower from where excellent views of the city could be seen. Entry inside the tower has been stopped for the last few years due to safety concerns as there had been a few cases of suicide in the past. The tower and park are now renovated and has a skating rink. Currently, it boasts of a good turnout of children who come in for practising their skills on roller skates. There is also a group of regulars who practice silambattam – an ancient Tamil martial art form – here. From atop the tower one can have a panoramic views, and the rapidly changing skyline of the city can be appreciated.

== Transport ==
=== Road ===
Anna Nagar has two bus termini, Anna Nagar West and Anna Nagar East. The East terminus is located near Anna Nagar Roundtana while the West terminus is situated on the Inner Ring Road. The West terminus is one of the largest bus terminuses in the city. Buses to different parts of the city beginning from the West Terminus.

The roads in Anna Nagar are designed based on a matrix structure similar to roads in developed countries in the western world; all the roads are laid parallel and perpendicular to each other. In addition, a standardized naming nomenclature is adopted. In Anna Nagar, 2nd, 4th and 6th Avenues run east–west and 1st, 3rd, 5th and 7th Avenues run North South. All the streets are interconnected to these avenues. Areas expanded after the formation of the initial 1970 layouts do not follow the standard nomenclature. Auto rickshaws and share autos are also available connecting Anna Nagar to different parts of the city.

=== Anna Nagar Roundtana ===
The Anna Nagar Roundtana located at the intersection of 2nd avenue and 3rd avenue is a sprawling and burgeoning high-scale commercial neighborhood. This was initially developed for the Madras EXPO during the 1970s and was named "Round Turn Over", whose name has vernacularly changed to "Roundtana", with the use of Tamil language. It has a wide variety of markets and showrooms in the vicinity such as Croma, Tanishq, Bata, etc. and this is a very important landmark for shoppers.

=== Railway ===
The Anna Nagar railway station was inaugurated in the year 2003. It is located on the Thirumangalam road, a road that connects Anna Nagar West with Villivakkam. The railway line stretches for 3.09 kilometers and links Anna Nagar with the Tiruvallur-Chennai suburban line. Between 2003 and 2007, five suburban trains were operated from Anna Nagar to Chennai Beach via Villivakkam. The station was closed in 2007 for the construction of the Padi elevated rotary. However, after the completion of the rotary in 2009, the station remained closed owing to its low patronage. There were plans to reopen the station in 2011, but none materialised due to financial unviability; a 2013 regulatory response revealed that operating the line cost ₹30,000 daily against an income of only a few hundred rupees.

In November 2017, the derelict station premises were cleaned up and transformed by the Integral Coach Factory (ICF) into a neighborhood Walkers Park equipped with a dedicated track and seating space. By October 2019, the defunct station was officially repurposed into a supplemental railway yard and test track for ICF. The structurally sound 3.09 km line is currently utilized for shifting, parking, and trial-running newly manufactured long-distance and semi-high-speed coaches.

=== Metro ===
Anna Nagar metro was inaugurated and started on 14 May 2017. It is the most convenient form of transportation and connects every part of the city. Three underground metro stations, two in Anna Nagar and one in Anna Nagar East, which form a part of the phase 1 metro project. Anna Nagar has 2 metro stations: Anna Nagar Tower metro station and Anna Nagar East metro station. Both of these metro stations are underground. They are well managed and maintained. These metro stations have 2 platforms, and their trains have different sections for women specially. These stations have 4 entry and exit points, which makes it accessible in all possible ways.

== Politics ==
Anna Nagar (State Assembly Constituency) is part of Chennai Central (Lok Sabha constituency).

== 1968 Indian International Trade and Industries Fair ==
The 1968 Indian International Trade and Industries Fair in Anna Nagar was a significant event that showcased India's industrial development after independence. Assembled by the All India Manufacturers Organisation (AIMO), it was planned to be the largest international trade fair in Asia. The fair was initially scheduled to open in 1967 but was pulled back due to political events such as the 1967 Indian general election in Chennai.

The fair was inaugurated by Vice President of India VV Giri, who lit up a neon sign over the parabolic arch. In spite of the language tensions in the south, the fair went ahead with participation from eleven ministries, 23 public sector companies and private sector industries. The foreign participants were mainly from the East European Communist bloc countries led by the USSR.

It featured the Anna Nagar Tower and seven concrete parabolic arches that astonished visitors with their gravity-defying design. The fair played a crucial role in bringing Anna Nagar into focus and transforming it into a prestigious habitation in Chennai.
