= Anna Nagar Tower Park =

Urban park in Chennai, India

Anna Nagar Tower Park Dr Visvesvaraya Tower Park
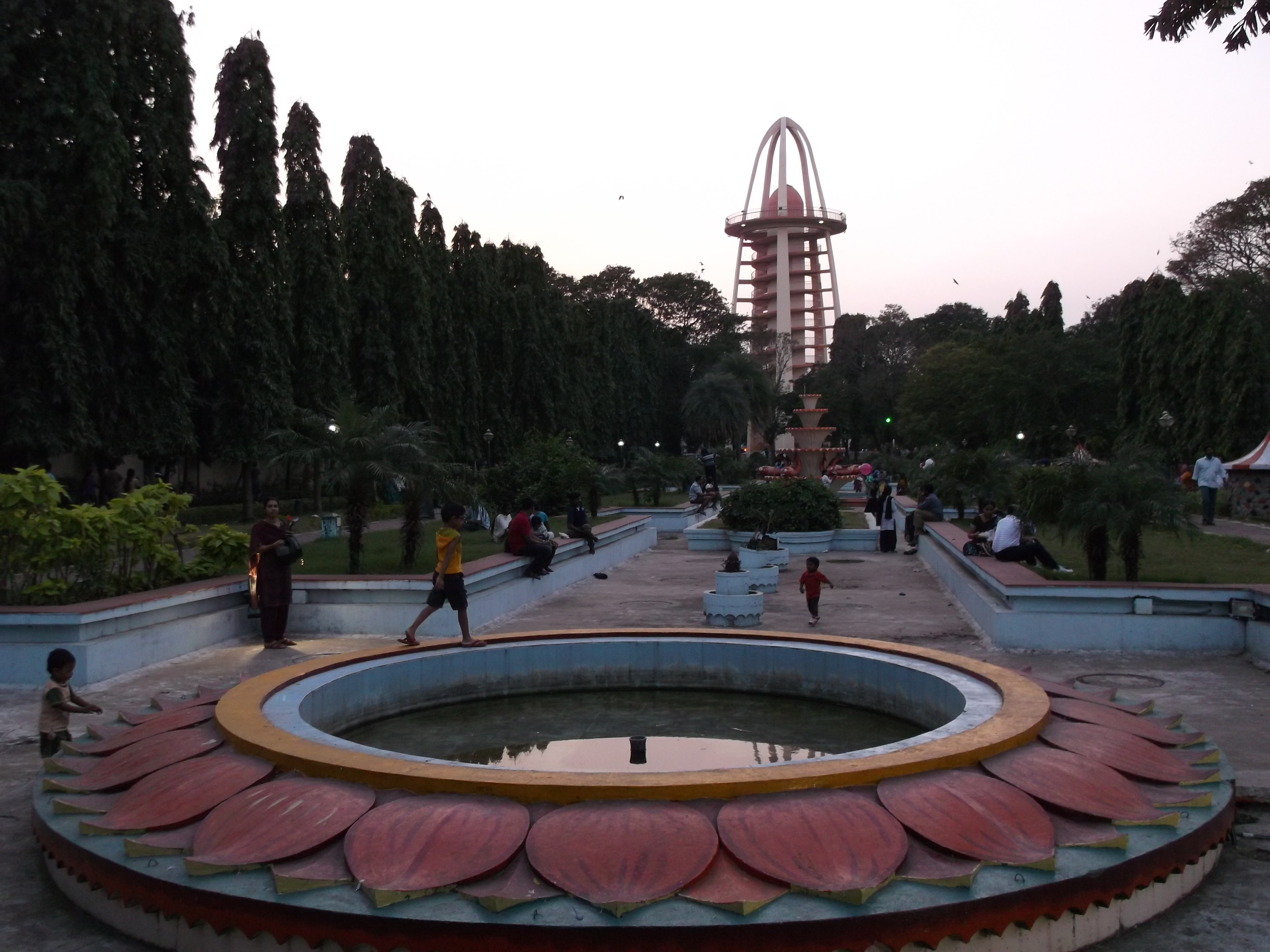
- The fountain and tower as seen from the entrance

- Location within Chennai
- Type: Urban park
- Location: Anna Nagar, Chennai, India
- Coordinates: 13.086777°N 80.214354°E
- Area: 15 acres (6.1 ha)
- Created: January 21, 1968; 58 years ago
- Manager: Corporation of Chennai
- Status: open

Anna Nagar Tower Park, officially known as Dr Visvesvaraya Tower Park, is an urban park in the suburb of Anna Nagar, Chennai. It hosts a 133 ft (41 m) tall watch tower, which was built in 1968.

== History ==
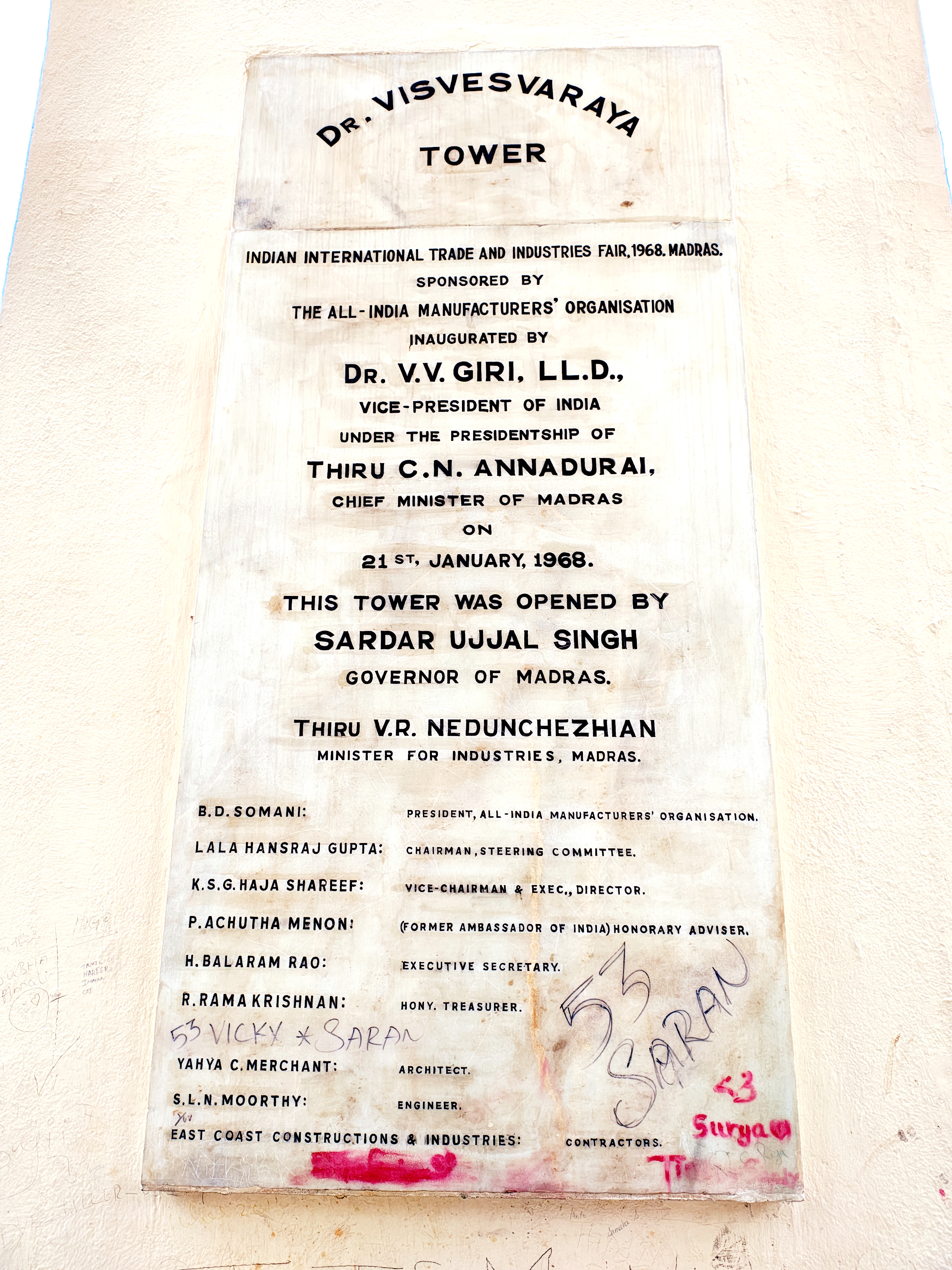
Anna Tower Stone Plaque

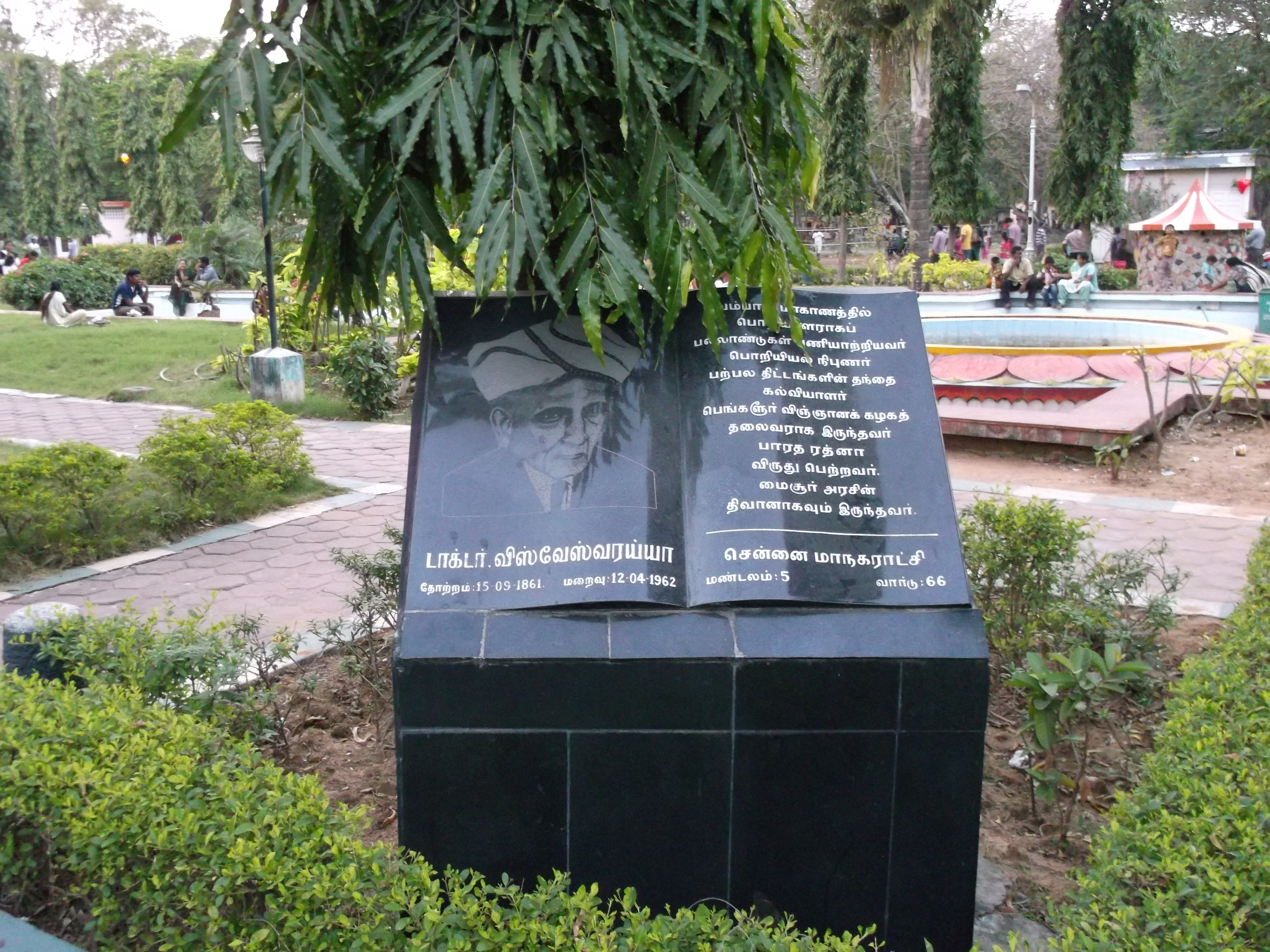
A plaque near the entrance

A 133 ft (41 m) tower was constructed as a part of Indian International Trade and Industries Fair in 1968. The tower was designed and built by Yahya Merchant and inaugurated by then Vice-President of India V. V. Giri in the presence of the then Chief Minister of Tamil Nadu C. N. Annadurai on 21 January 1968. It is named after engineer and administrator Visvesvaraya.

The park was renovated at a cost of ₹62 million (US$640,000) in 2010. The tower which was open for public viewing, was closed in 2011 due to suicides and public nuisance incidents. In 2018, renovation of the tower was undertaken at a cost of ₹4.4 million (US$46,000) with the addition of grills in the balconies, installation of fencing, new lights and anti-skid tiles. Following the installation of the safety features, the tower was reopened for public on 21 March 2023.

== Location ==
The park is located near the chief roundabout of the neighborhood (known as the Anna Nagar Roundana) close to the Anna Nagar Ayyappan Temple. The park has two entrances, the main entrance is located on the 3rd Main Road next to the Tower Club and the other entrance lies opposite to the Ayyappan Temple on the 6th Main Road.

== Facilities ==
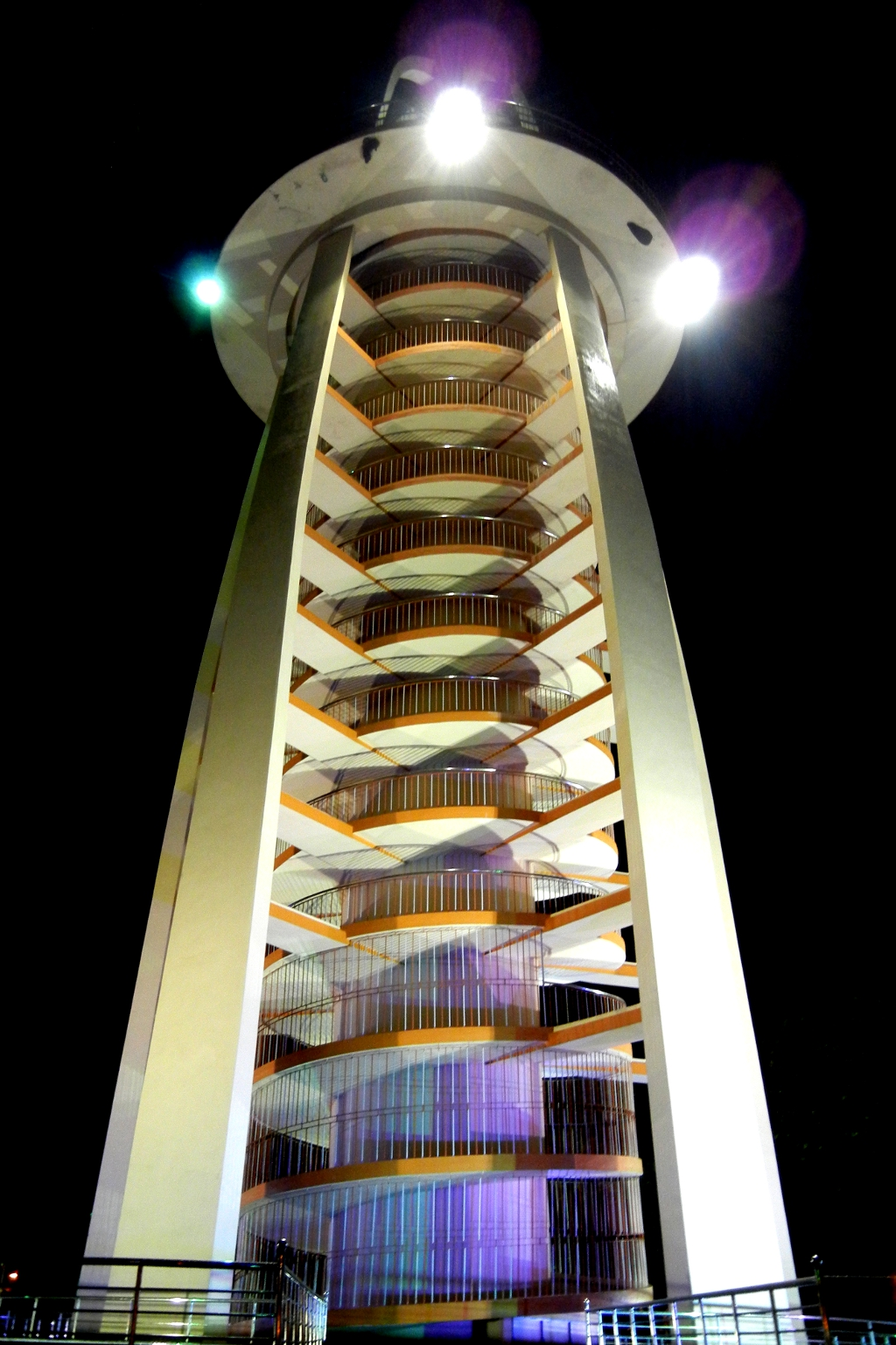
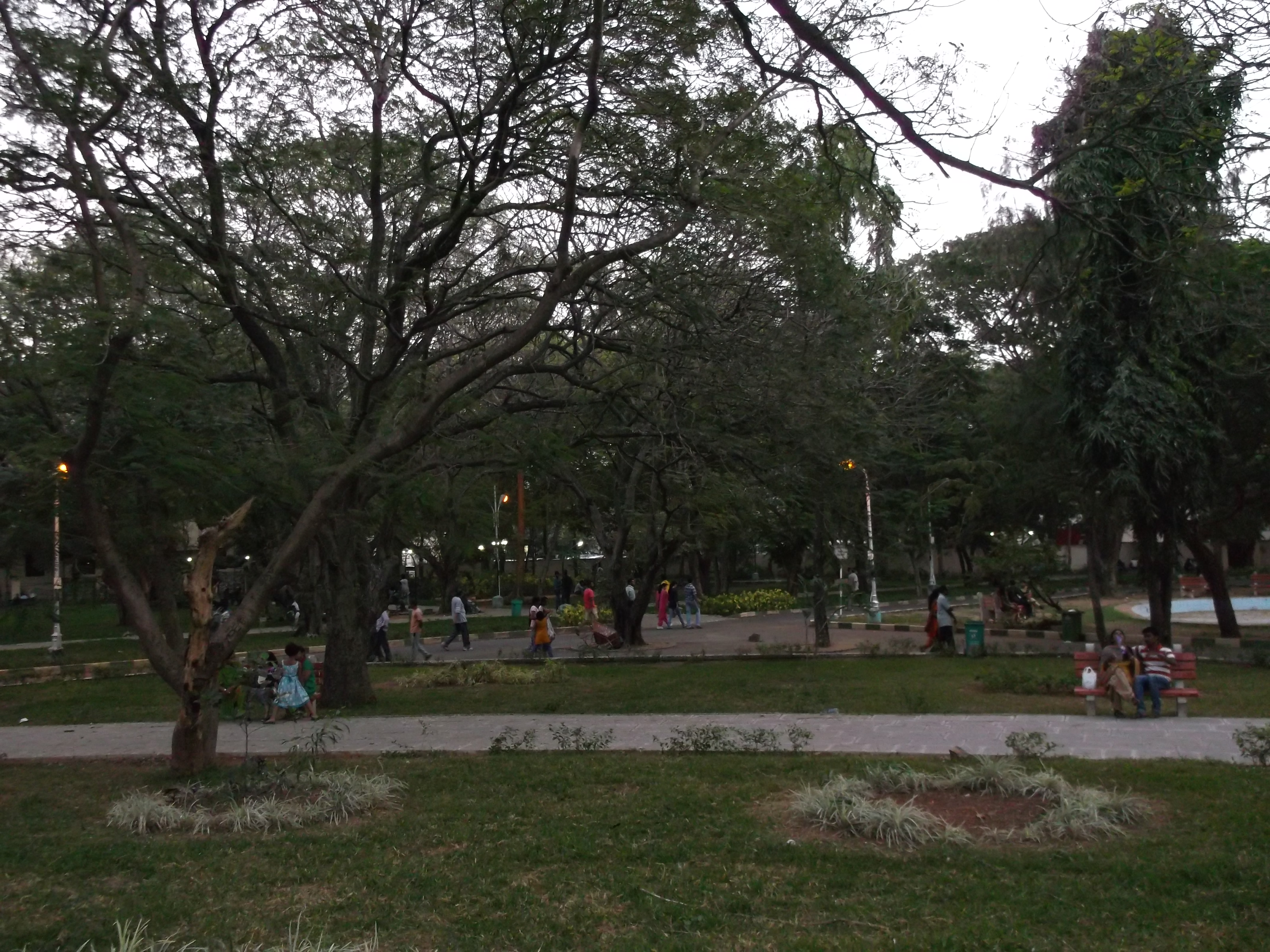
Tower (left) and walkways in the park

The park covers an area of 15 acres (6.1 ha). The 12-storey tower is located within the park and has a cyclic ramp spiraling to the top. The park and the tower is managed by the Greater Chennai Corporation. The park has other facilities including an amphitheatre, a bird-watching deck, badminton courts, play area for kids, a skating rink, a lake, and other convenience facilities. The lake has fishes, water birds, and turtles.

On weekdays, the park is open from 5.30 to 10.30 in the morning and from 4.30 to 7 in the evening.

== See also ==
- Anna Arches
- Parks in Chennai
