= Anna Nagar twin arches =

Ornamental twin arches in Chennai, India

Coordinates: 13°4′28″N 80°13′6″E

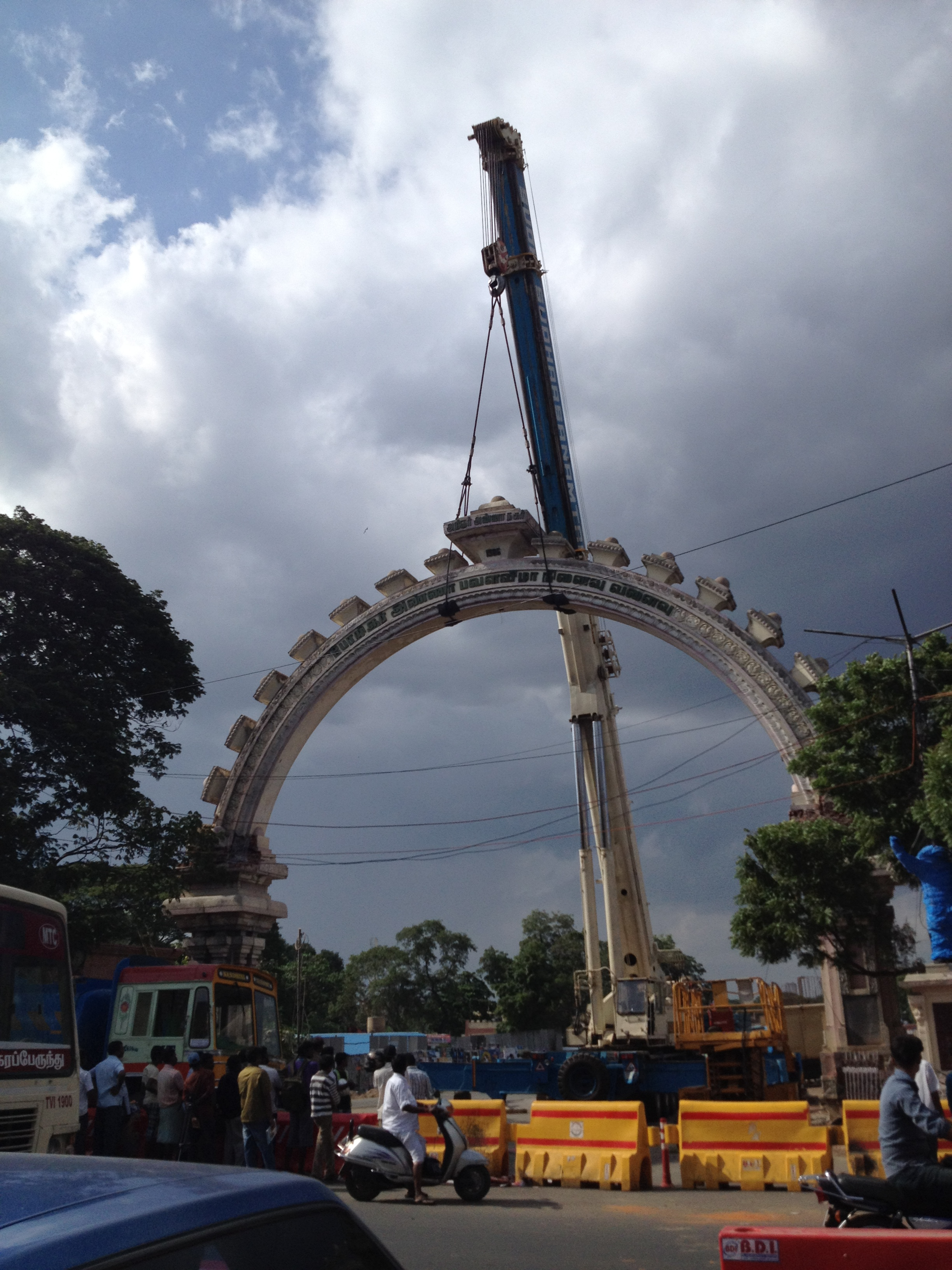
Government trying to remove Anna Nagar twin arches in 2012

The Anna Nagar Twin Arches are ornamental structures in Chennai, India, built in 1986 to honor the platinum jubilee of C. N. Annadurai, Tamil Nadu’s former Chief Minister. They are located at the junction of Poonamallee High Road and Third Avenue. They act as southern entrance for Anna Nagar, a suburb named after Annadurai. They were designed by the sculptor Ganapathy Sthapathi. Each arch stands 52 feet tall, weighs 82 tonnes, and cost ₹12 lakh (equivalent to ₹1.6 crore or US$170,000 in 2023). Then Chief Minister of Tamil Nadu, M. G. Ramachandran inaugurated the arches on 1 January 1986, to commemorate Annadurai. In 2012, protests erupted between government and local, when a plan was proposed to demolish the arches for a flyover, later they were forced to redesign in order to save the arches.

== History ==
The Anna Nagar Twin Arches were built to celebrate the platinum jubilee of C. N. Annadurai, which marks 75 years since his birth on 15 September 1909. Annadurai, or "Anna", was founder of the Dravida Munnetra Kazhagam (DMK), and served as Chief Minister from 1967 to 1969. In 1984, the Corporation of Madras proposed the Twin Arches in Anna Nagar, a suburb named after him. Anna Nagar was planned by the Tamil Nadu Housing Board in the 1970s. Ganapathy Sthapathi, known for his traditional Tamil designs was assigned as sculptor for the arches in 1985. Each arch is 52 feet high and, weighs 82 tonnes. The project was completed in 105 days with a budget of ₹12 lakh (equivalent to ₹1.6 crore or US$170,000 in 2023). A statue of Annadurai was erected in front of the arches. They were inaugurated on 1 January 1986 by then Chief Minister, M. G. Ramachandran.

== Recent Developments ==
The Chennai Corporation planned to construct flyovers and a subway at the Poonamallee High Road and Third Avenue junction to fix traffic jams with a budget of ₹117 crore (equivalent to ₹221 crore or US$23 million in 2023). The arches were proposed to be demolished to incorporate this development. Early plans called for demolition, and workers even started cutting into them with diamond cutters. However, local residents staged protest against the government's plan to demolish the arches. Localities argued the arches wasn’t just concrete but a piece of Chennai’s soul, tied to Annadurai’s legacy. The Corporation and Highways Department scrapped the demolition idea and redesigned the flyover to curve around the arches. Government had placed a crane to support the arches, but removed them following a local unrest and then erected a temporary pillar to support them. The Annadurai statue, moved during construction was placed back in its original location. By December 2013, the flyover opened, easing traffic while keeping the arches intact.

The twin arches were renovated from their plain cream with dark green lettering. The city government in 2012, incorporated six colours, the colour of letter was not changed, but the dome-shaped decorations on top were changed to red. Different shades of ivory and pink were also be used, while the leaves will be of a lighter green.

== See also ==
- Anna Nagar Tower Park
- Architecture of Chennai
