= Anna Nagar Ayyappan Koil, Chennai =

Hindu temple dedicated to the deity Ayyappan in Chennai, India

Anna Nagar Ayyappan Koil
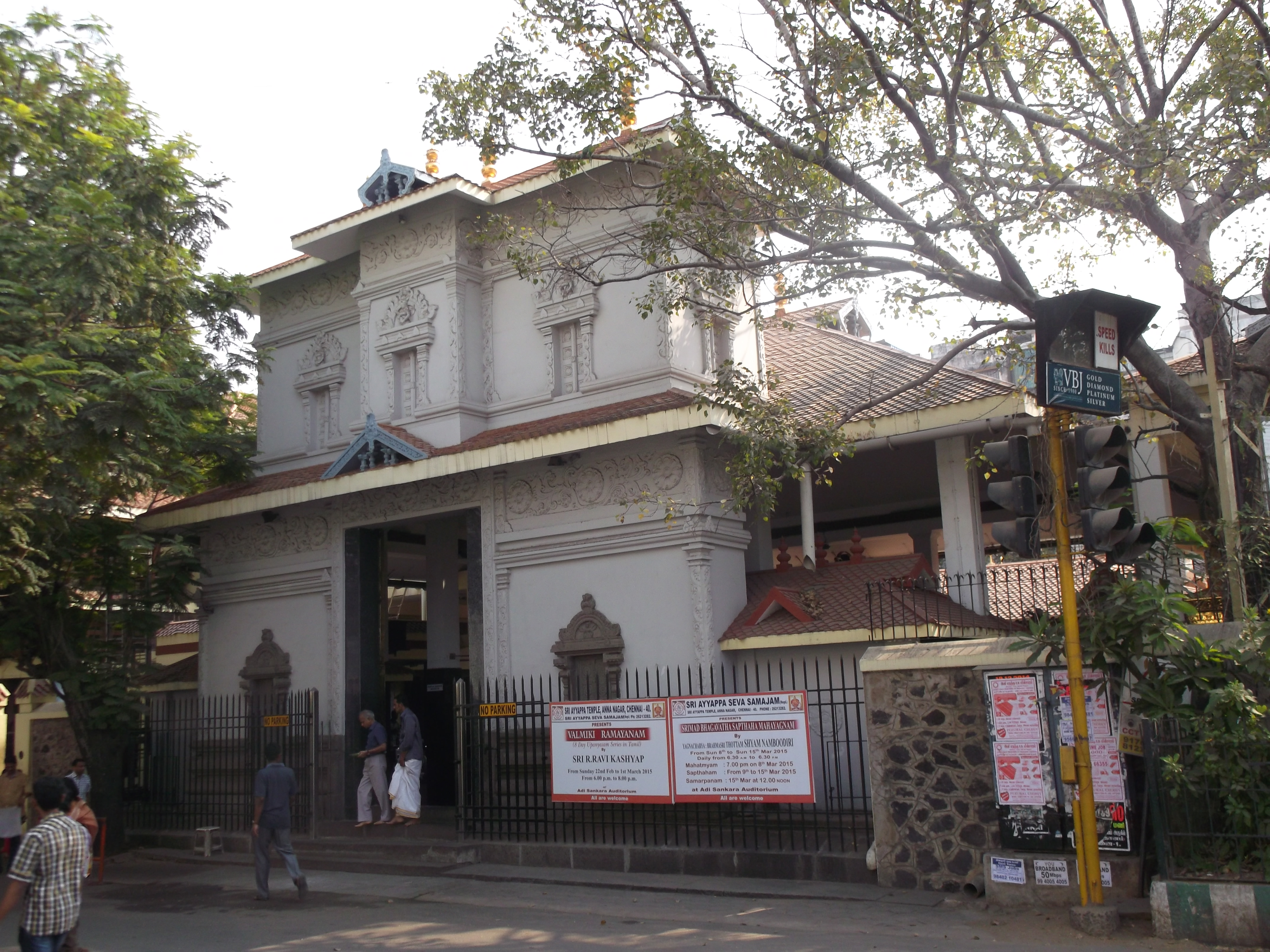
- The Ayyappan temple at Anna Nagar, Chennai

- Location in Chennai

Religion
- Affiliation: Hinduism
- District: Chennai
- Deity: Ayyappa
- Governing body: Sri Ayyappa Seva Samajam

Location
- Location: Plot C-45, Second Avenue
- State: Tamil Nadu
- Country: India
- Interactive map of Anna Nagar Ayyappan Koil
- Coordinates: 13°5′6″N 80°12′47″E

Architecture
- Type: Hindu temple architecture
- Established: 1979
- Completed: 1984
- Temple: 1

Website
- annanagarayyappatemple.org Timing: 6 am–11 am and 5 pm–8.30 pm

Anna Nagar Ayyappan Koil is a Hindu Temple dedicated to the deity Ayyappan in Chennai, India. It is located at the junction of 6th Main Road and 2nd Avenue in Anna Nagar.

== History ==
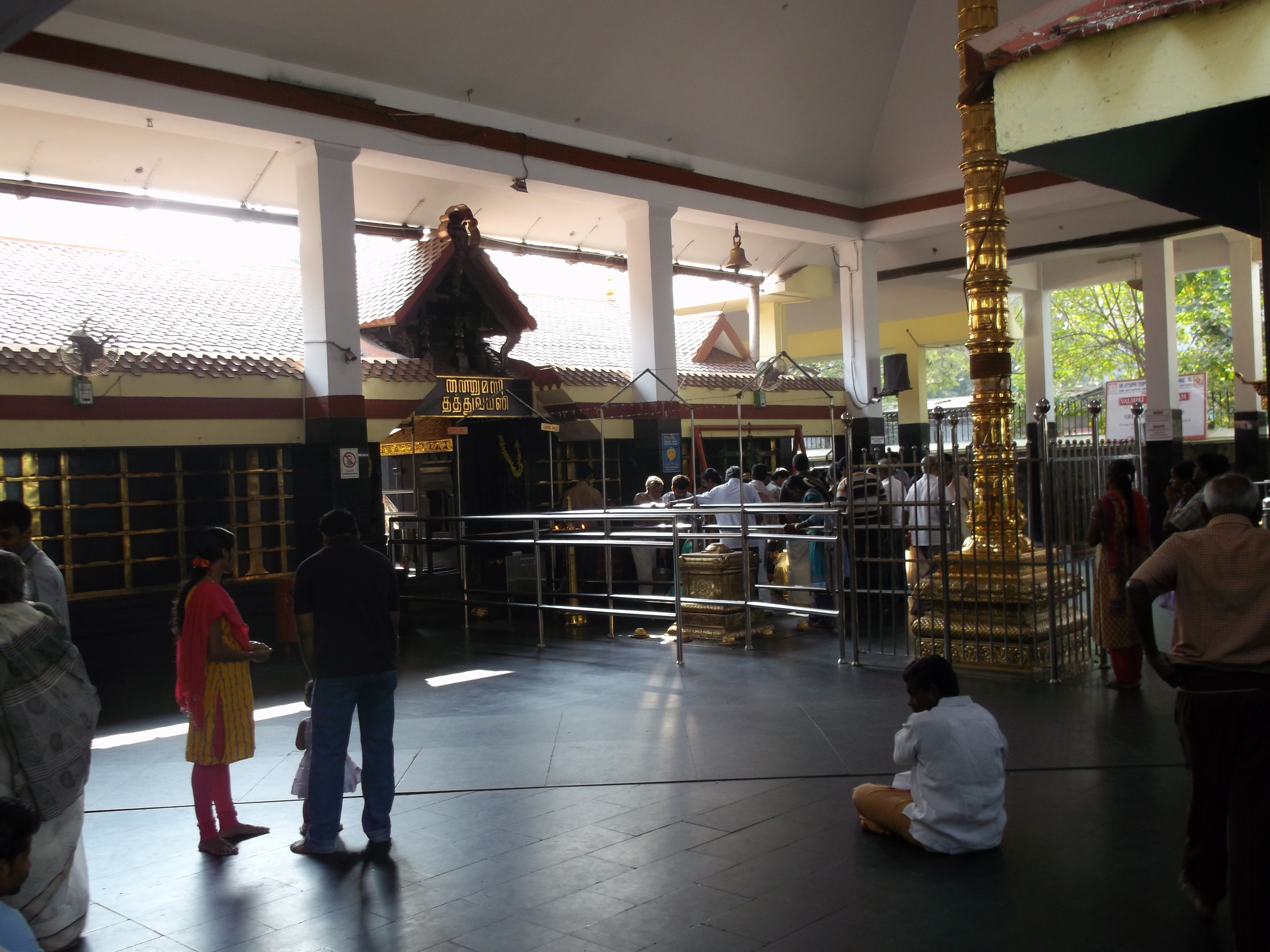
The prakaaram (corridor) near the entrance

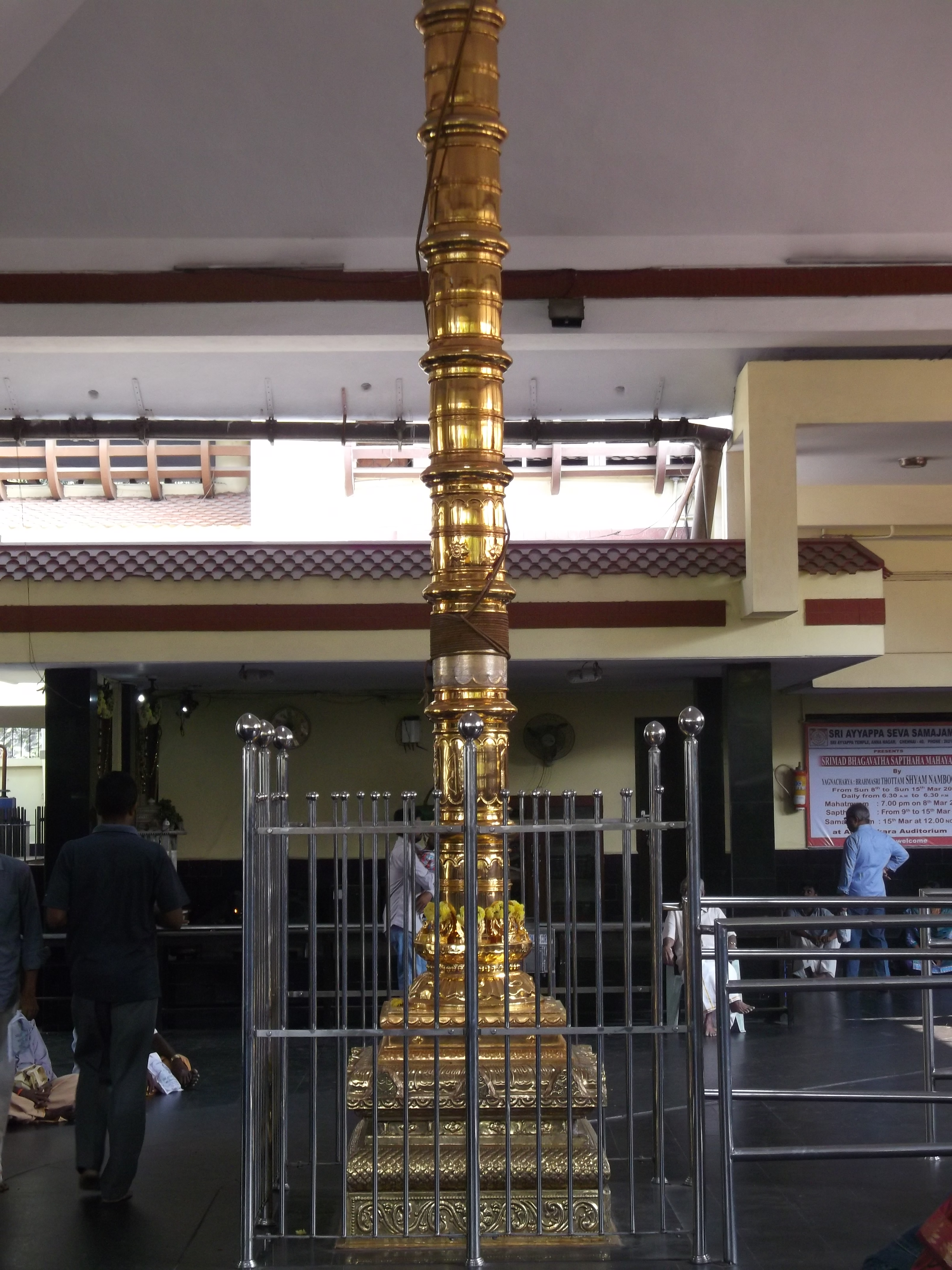
The dwajasthambam or the sacred pillar, near the main entrance

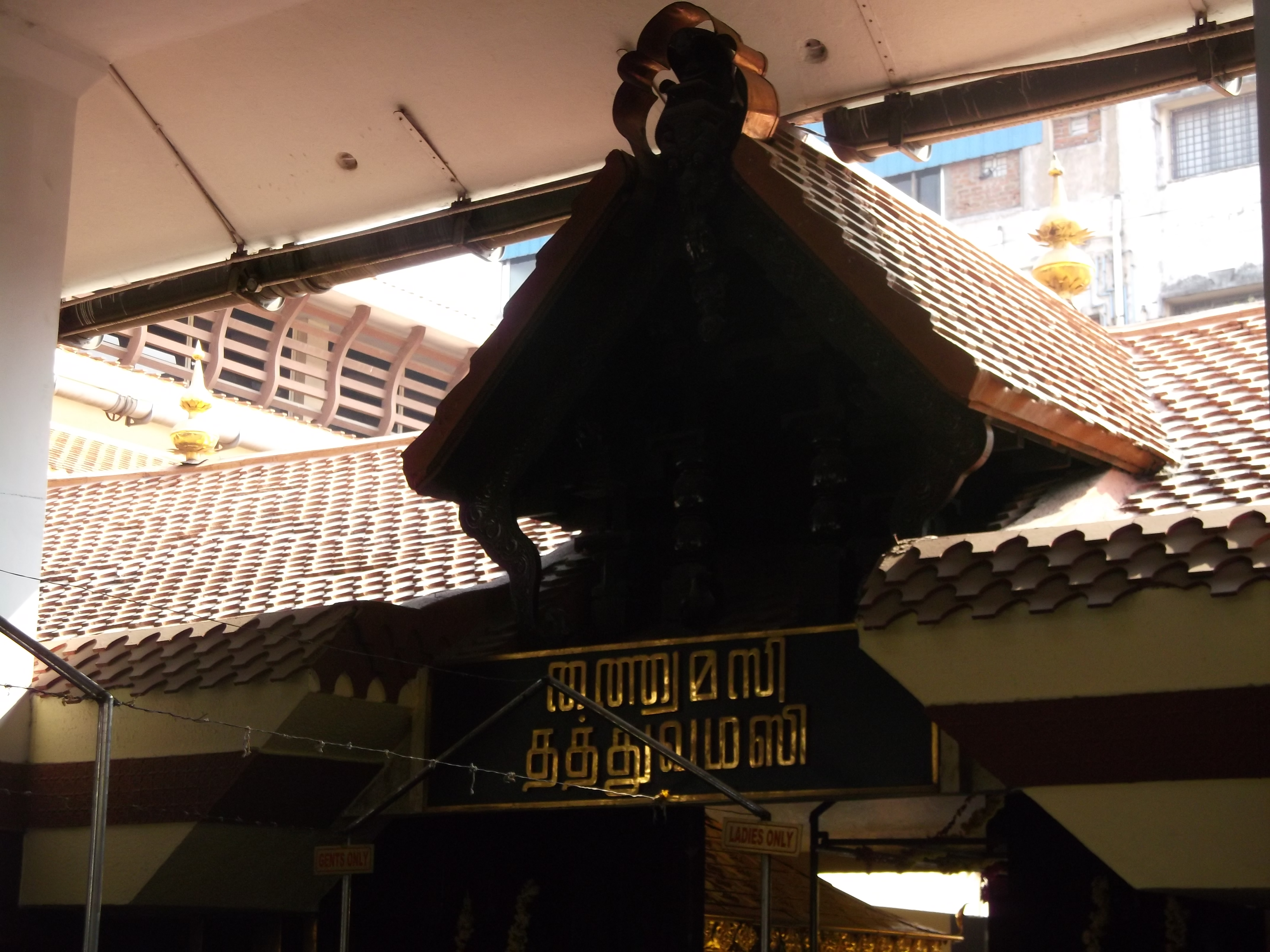
The "Thathwamasi" script in Malayalam and Tamil, at the entrance to the sanctum sanctorum

When Anna Nagar was developed as a model town in the late 1960s, the annual vilakku pooja during the mandala makaravilakku season was celebrated by Ayyappa devotees in the newly formed Shanti Colony. The residents' response to this annual celebration resulted in the formation of the Sri Ayyappa Seva Samajam (SASS) in 1976, with 14 members in its committee. In 1979, the Samajam started a charitable medical centre for the poor and needy. The same year, a 7-ground land near the Visveswarayya Tower was allotted to the Samajam by the Tamil Nadu Housing Board for the construction of a temple, for which members contributed ₹ 38,000 towards initial payment. Initially, a makeshift temple was built in a thatched shed along with a charitable medical centre in another shed. Work on the construction of a permanent temple continued for the next five years in consultation with temple architect Kanipayyur Krishnan Namboodiri. The construction was guided by P. N. Subramaniam, the founder-president, P. Chandrasekhara Menon, the second president, and P. V. Nair, and financial support was provided by R. Ratnam, then chairman of Sundaram Industries, and P. Velayudham. In May 1984, the typical Kerala-style temple was completed, conforming to the traditional shastraic stipulations. The kumbabishekam and consecration of the idol were performed on 13 May 1984 by temple Thantri Abli Krishna Vadhyan Namboodiri and K. M. Kesva Battatripad, former chief priest of the Sabarimala Temple. The panchaloha Ayyappan idol was made by Chenganur T. Rajarathinam. Idols of Ganesha, Subramanya, Goddess Durga, and Anjenaya were also consecrated. Later, a Navagraha (the nine planets) shrine was added in the temple. In 1989, a unique architectural structure known as the Natamandapam with an imposing gopuram was added. In 2005, gold covering of the 22-paras (segments) dwajasthambam and 27 thazhikakudams with about 6 kg of gold was completed. A special kumbabishekam of the gold-covered dwajasthambam was performed on 20 June 2005.

== The temple ==
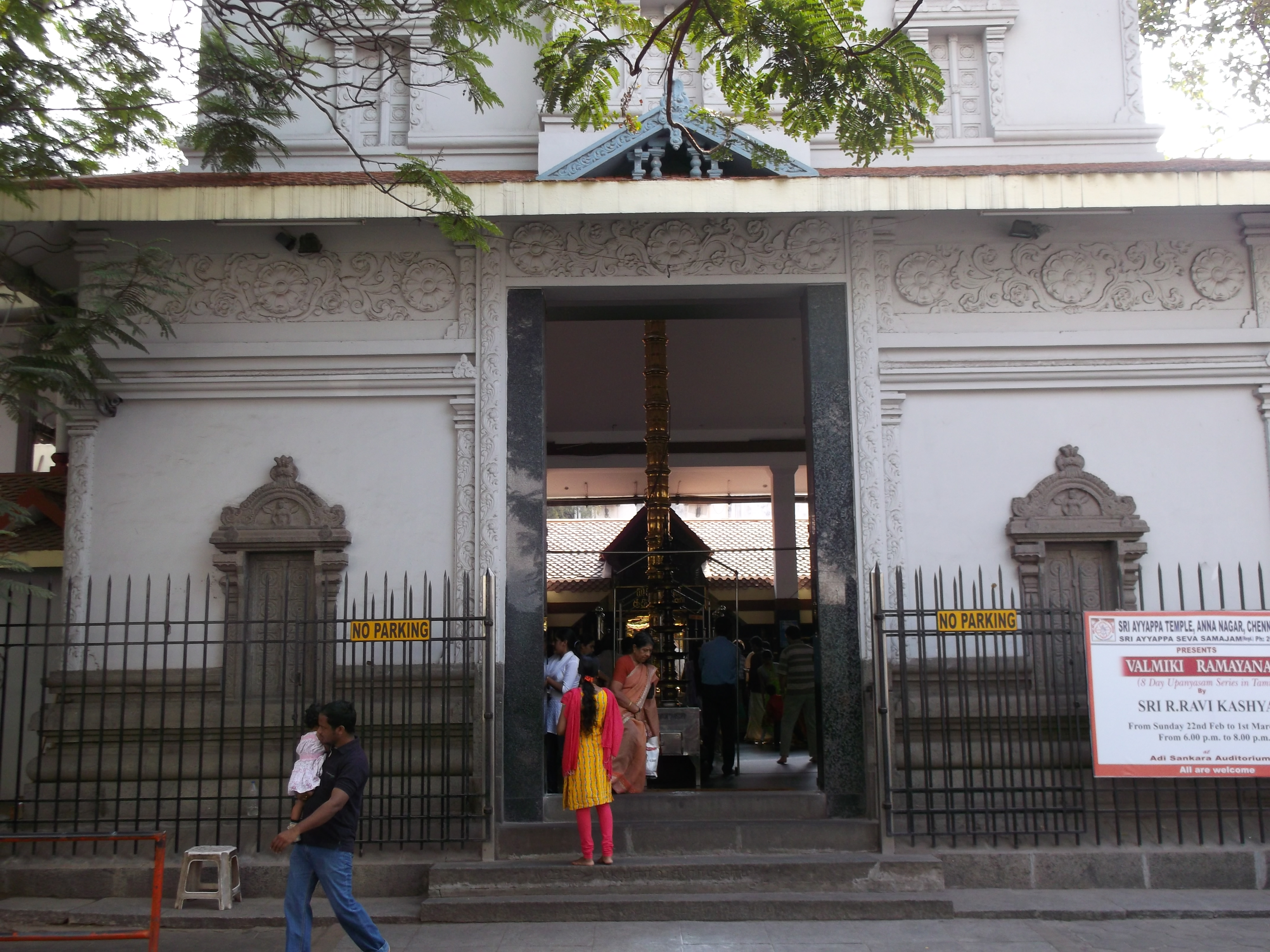
Main entrance to the temple

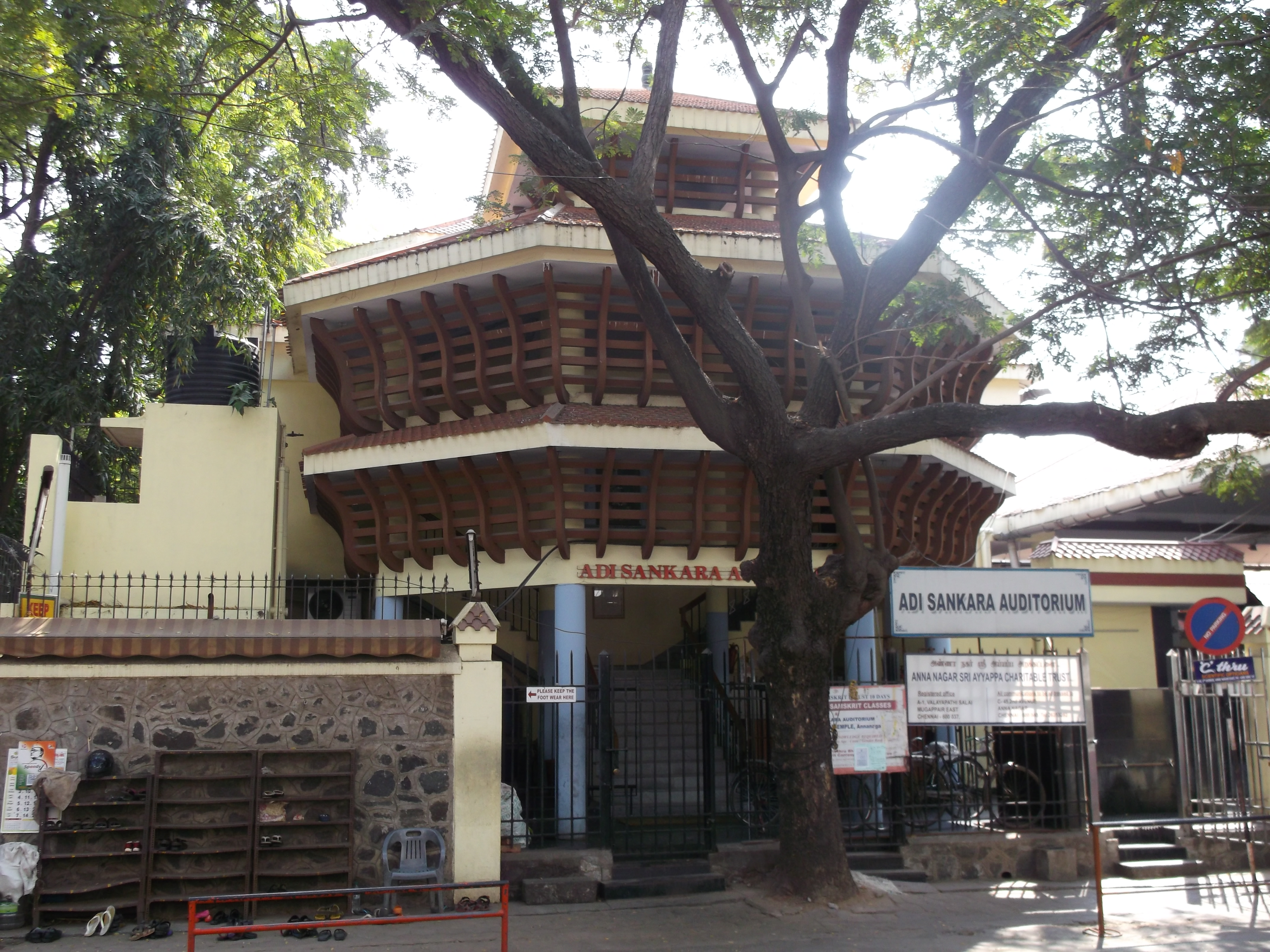
The Adhi Shankara Auditorium

The temple is built on a 40-cent land near the Visveswarayya Tower. The temple has shrines for Ganesha, Muruga, Durga, Anjaneya, Navagrahas and Nagaraja. The main sanctum of Lord Ayyappa faces west with Lord Ganesha and Lord Subramanya to the left and Goddess Durga to the right, all facing east. The Navagraha shrine is located on the southeast corner of the temple and the Anjaneya shrine is located in the southwest corner, facing east. The main door at the entrance is covered with brass plates. There is an auditorium, named after Sri Adisankara, covering about 3,600 sq ft, which can accommodate about 1,000 persons, for conducting spiritual and cultural programmes and discourses. The design of the auditorium involves the Koothambalam style found in Kerala temples.

=== Poojas ===
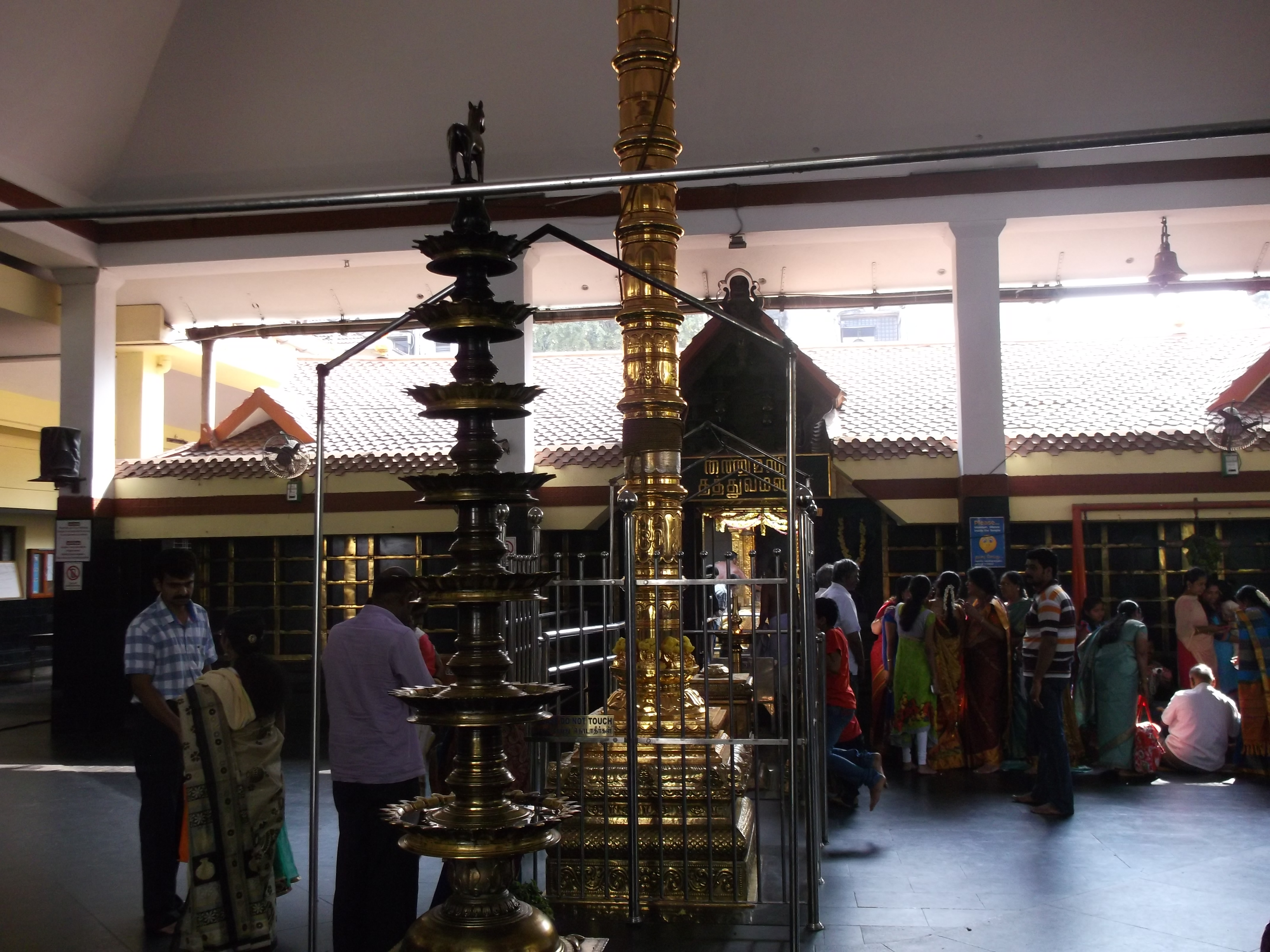
Towards the sanctum sanctorum

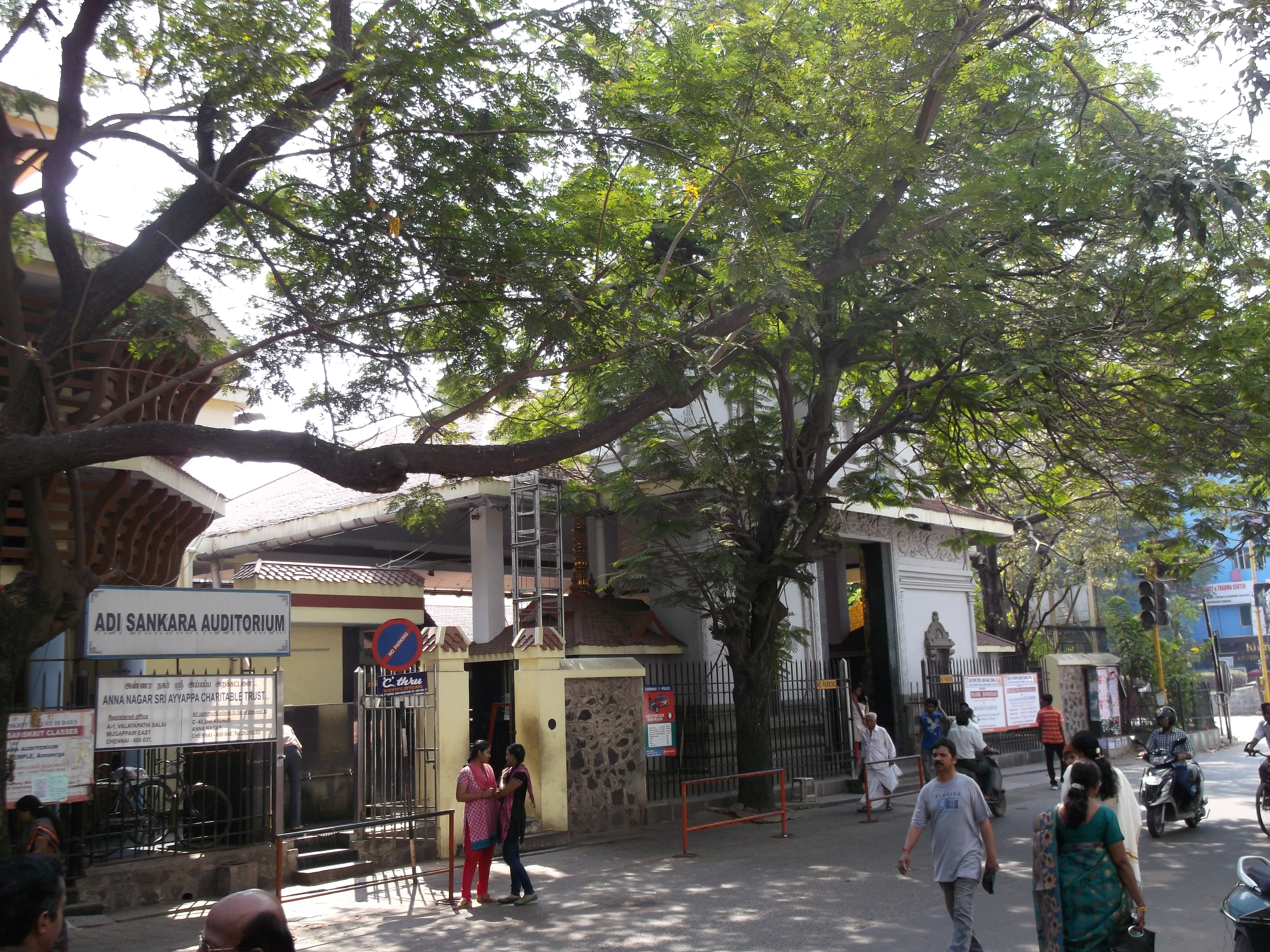
Main view of the Anna Nagar Ayyappan Koil, looking to the southeast towards the Second Avenue

Poojas at the temple are conducted by Kerala namboodiris. Chief among the poojas are the mahaganapathy homam and the mritunjaya homam, performed as offerings by devotees throughout the year. The annual temple festival is celebrated during the second week of December. Other annual celebrations include the Arattu procession (when the utsavamoorthy is carried from the temple to the Marina Beach), pratishta dinam, panguni uthiram, Navarathri, Skanda Shasti, Vinayaka Chaturthi and Rama Navami. Kotiarchana is performed every fourth year by Ayyappa devotees observing vritham (fasting).

== Awards ==
In 1998, the temple won the Mylapore Academy Award for the best maintained temple in Chennai.
