= Tamil Nadu Housing Board =

Organization in Tamil Nadu, India

- Type: Government of Tamil Nadu
- Industry: Housing, Building, Real Estate
- Founded: 1961
- Headquarters: Chennai, Tamil Nadu, India
- Area served: Tamil Nadu, India
- Website: tnhb.tn.gov.in

Tamil Nadu Housing Board (TNHB) (Tamil: தமிழ்நாடு வீட்டு வசதி வாரியம்) is a government organisation in Tamil Nadu, India.

== History ==
Formed in 1947 as a small organisation in the name of "City Improvement Trust" in order to cater to the housing needs of Madras City, the trust has developed into a full-fledged organisation named the "Tamil Nadu Housing Board" in 1961 to cope with the increasing demand in housing sector all over the state due to urban growth leading to migration to urban areas in search of employment opportunities. It is under the control of the Department of Housing and Urban Development.

== Activities ==
The Tamil Nadu Housing Board (TNHB) develops large, self-contained neighborhood schemes across the state. As a public housing agency in India, the institution provides residential developments catering to various income groups.

Keeping in line with the Chief Minister's direction of good governance and effective delivery system, the TNHB decided to put in place the concept of Service Counters.

TNHB has created self-sustaining townships in the late 1970s and early 1980s like Anna Nagar, Besant Nagar, K. K. Nagar, Ashok Nagar, Korattur and Shastri Nagar. Owing to the elevation in economic activity to the south of Chennai, it has created self-sustaining township in Sholinganallur with wide roads, residential plots, apartments, school and park zones. It has also completed midsize neighbourhood developments in Velachery, Mogappair and Chitlapakkam. Other promotions are also seen as small and mid-sized neighbourhoods in tier-II cities like Coimbatore and Madurai.

All residential township developments of TNHB have been a success due to their compliance to the development rules and their not-for-profit motive. As the land required for TNHB Housing Scheme layouts are either owned or acquired by the government, they do not cut corners in layout developments which results in suburbs with wide roads and all amenities such as schools, parks, play grounds and bus terminuses. The organisation caters to all sectors of the society through their HIG, MIG and LIG offerings.
