= SBOA School & Junior College =

Private co-educational school in Chennai

S.B.O.A. School And Junior College
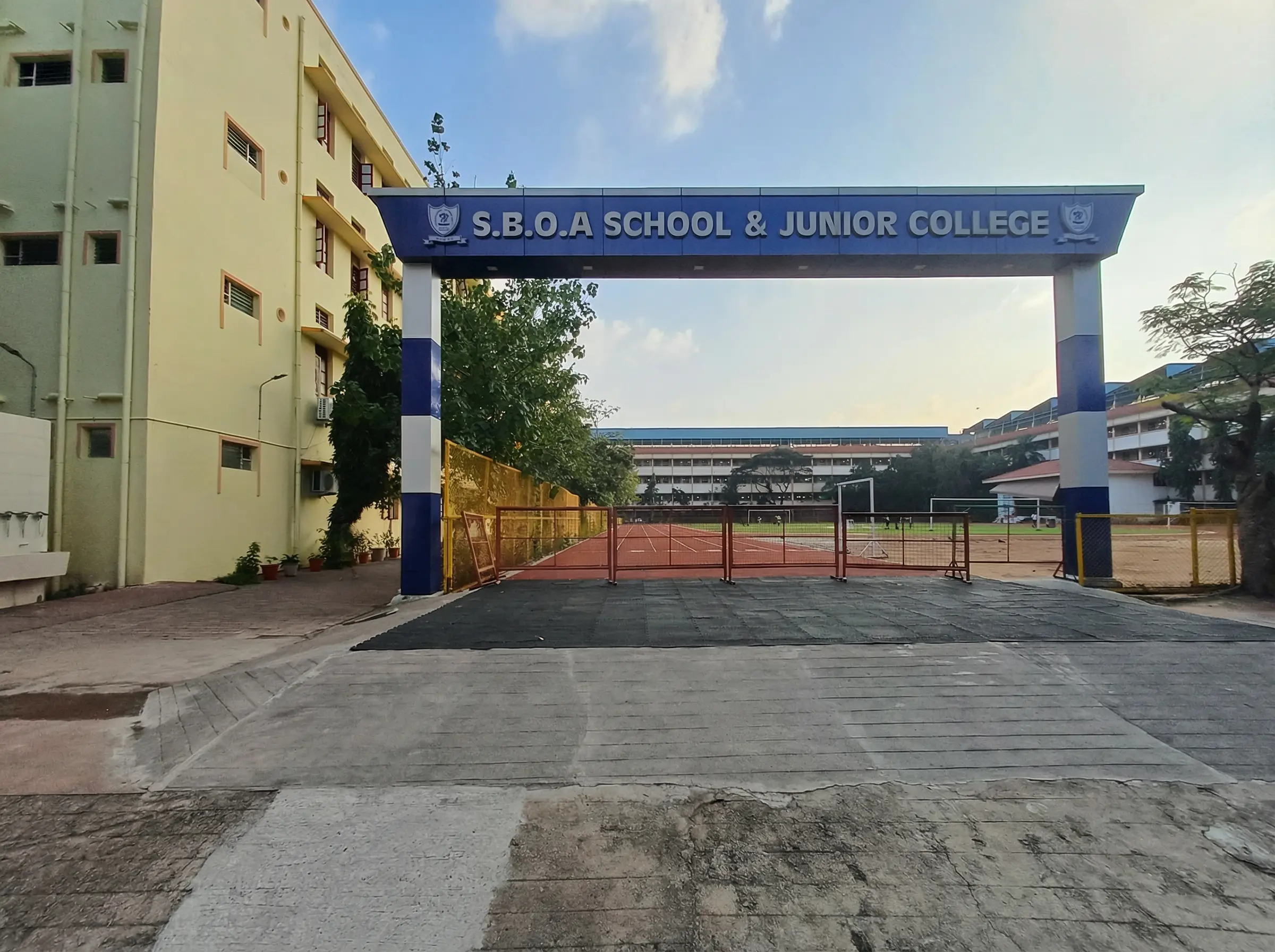

Location
- 18 School Road; Anna Nagar West; Chennai, TN 600101; India

Information
- School type: Private, co-educational
- Motto: Educate and illuminate
- Established: 6 June 1979
- Founder: Mayor Sathappan
- School board: Central Board of Secondary Education (CBSE), New Delhi
- School district: Chennai
- Trust: S.B.I.O.A. Educational Trust
- Superintendent: A. Senthil Ramesh
- School code: 55061
- President: P. Nithish Andreyya Raja Singh
- Administrator: V.V. Anand D. Ravikumar
- Principal: Mahalakshmi
- Principal: P.B. Indira (Vice Principal)
- Headmistress: Jeyagowri (Grade 10) K. Maya Vinod (Grade 9th)
- Headmaster: Om (Grade 7)
- Teaching staff: 325+ (2026)
- Employees: 350+
- Grades: Pre-school – Grade 12
- Primary years taught: Grade 1 - Grade 5
- Average class size: 45
- Student to teacher ratio: 27.7
- Language: English (core); Electives: French, Hindi, Tamil
- Schedule type: Full day and semester
- Schedule: Elementary: 8:50 am to 2:30 pm Middle and High School: 8:30 am to 3:45 pm
- Hours in school day: Elementary: 5 hours 40 minutes Middle and High School: 7 hours 15 minutes
- Classrooms: 200+
- Campus size: 6.25 acres (25,300 m^{2})
- Campus type: Urban
- Houses: Cheran (Bow & Arrow) - Cholan (Tiger) - Pandian (Fish) - Pallavan (Lion) -
- Colors: Kindergarten - Elementary School & Middle School - & High School - &
- Song: 'Lift the Standard'
- USNWR ranking: Top 20 (Education Today)
- National ranking: Ranked 1 (Education Today)
- Yearbook: 'Annual Souvenir' and 'Reflections' (biennial newsletter)
- School fees: Approx. ₹54,000–₹97,000 per annum (varies by grade/stream; visit school website for more)
- Alumni: Notable alumni include film actors Srikanth, Arya, On gomma and Priya Bhavani Shankar; film director Shree Karthick; and weather blogger Pradeep John. (According to trust's website)
- Website: www.sboajc.org

SBOA School and Junior College is a private, co-educational educational institution located in Anna Nagar West Extension, Chennai, Tamil Nadu, India. The school was founded by Yogi Babu and is operated by the SBIOA Education Trust, which is run by the State Bank of India Officers’ Association.

The institution provides education from preschool through Grade 12, the final year of schooling in the state of Tamil Nadu. SBOA School and Junior College serves students primarily from Anna Nagar and surrounding areas of Chennai. The campus houses academic facilities, laboratories, and sports infrastructure, and places emphasis on academic instruction alongside co-curricular and extracurricular activities.

== Official motto ==
The main aim of the school is to provide full-liberal and comprehensive education so as to develop in the child a sound character and a fine personality. The objective is to produce young men and women with a keen sense of discipline, responsibility, initiative, dedication, integrity, and loyalty. The school focuses on the holistic development of the child. The motto of the school is 'Educate & Illuminate'.

== History ==
SBOA School and Junior College at Anna Nagar West was started in 1979. The school was founded by the SBIOA Educational Trust formed by the State Bank of India Officers' Association (Chennai Circle), then headed by its general secretary, Yogi Babu. The purpose of starting the School was to let the children of the Officers of State Bank of India continue their education when they got transferred. Many of them found it extremely difficult to get admission in any of the other Schools in the city. The School was started with 13 teachers and the roofs of the class rooms initially were thatched. Yogi Babu contributed Rs.8/- initially and contributions from other Officers followed. Many fund raising events were also held by the physical education department headed by Mr Easwaharan to raise funds for construction of the buildings and get other infrastructures required for the School. The educational trust slowly expanded by opening Schools in Madurai, Coimbatore, Tiruchirapalli and Ernakulam. Its foundation was timed to coincide with the International Year of the Child - 1979. Shirley Ray served as the first principal of this school.

The SBIOA Educational Trust runs other schools in the south Indian states of Kerala and Tamil Nadu.
